= Cope Street =

Street in south-central Dublin, Ireland

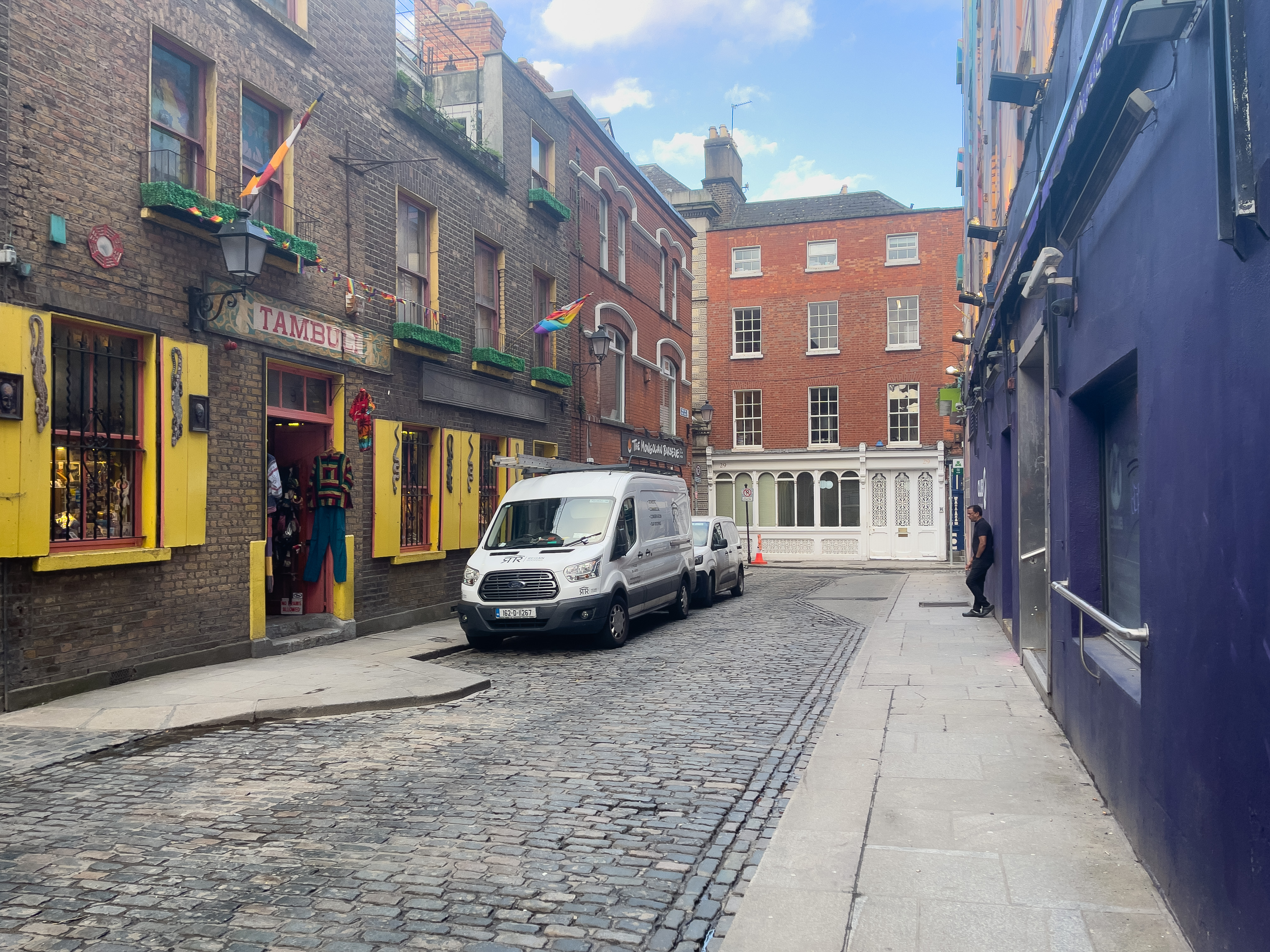
- East end of the street
- Interactive map of Cope Street
- Native name: Sráid Cope (Irish)
- Former names: Cope Street South; South Cope Street (until 1821)
- Part of: Temple Bar
- Namesake: Robert Cope
- Length: 100 m (330 ft)
- Width: 7 metres (23 ft)
- Location: Dublin, Ireland
- Postal code: D02
- Coordinates: 53°20′42″N 6°15′45″W
- west end: Fownes Street
- east end: Anglesea Street

Construction
- Completion: 1740s–50s

Other
- Known for: Central Plaza, Georgian architecture, Asian restaurants

Cope Street (Irish: Sráid Cope) is a street in the Temple Bar area of south Dublin, Ireland.

Cope Street runs straight west–east from Fownes Street to Anglesea Street and is intersected by Crown Alley. The street is covered by setts.

== History ==
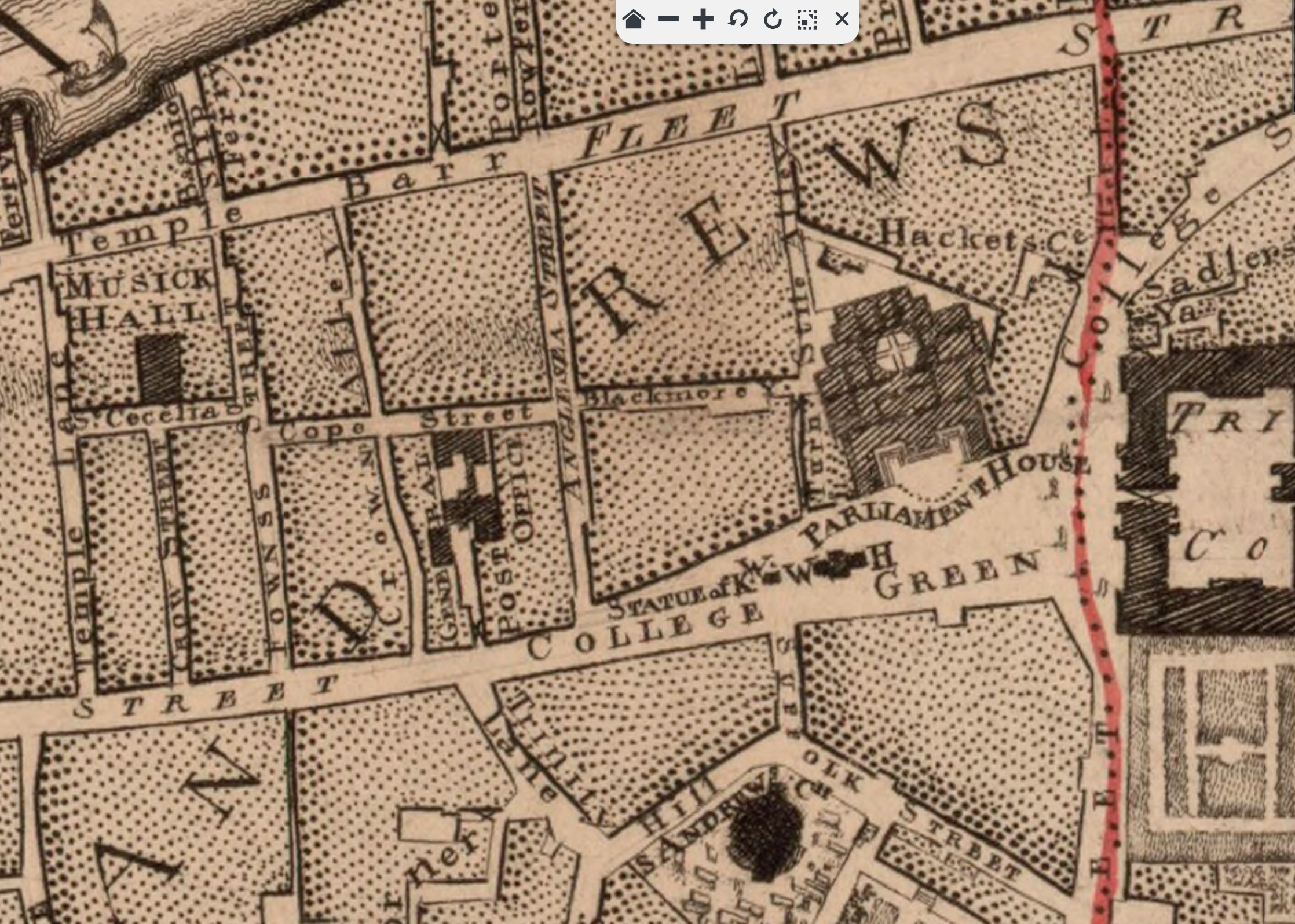
John Rocque's 1756 map of Dublin, Cope Street at centre.

The street is named for Robert Cope (1679–1753), a Huguenot 18th-century MP in the Irish House of Commons. His second marriage was to Elizabeth, daughter of Sir William Fownes, after whom Fownes Street is named. Talbot Street was known as Cope Street North or North Cope Street until 1821, and so should not be confused with Cope Street on the southside, which was sometimes called "Cope Street South" or "South Cope Street" until the northside street was renamed.

At the time of Charles Brooking's map of Dublin (1728), the area where the street now lies is marked by buildings located between Anglesea Street and Crown Alley.

The street first appears named on John Rocque's 1756 map of Dublin.

Many of its Georgian buildings are architecturally and historically significant. The 1918 brick building at 1–3 Cope Street is also recorded by the National Inventory of Architectural Heritage, as is the Victorian structure at the junction with Anglesea Street.

The General Post Office was located on the street from 1757 until 1783.

In 1799, the Commercial Buildings were constructed on Dame street with the rear facing onto Cope Street. These housed many of the most important offices in the city as well as the Dublin Stock Exchange for a period.

Originally, the street would have connected with Turnstile Alley (Foster Place) via a continuation street named Blackmore Yard. This laneway was later eliminated by the Wide Streets Commissioners around the beginning of the 19th century.

A factory at 7 Cope Street was the first in Ireland to make chamber pots and water closets.

The Irish postcard makers Cardall were based at 8 Cope Street in the 1940s–60s.

The Central Bank building was erected with the rear facing onto the street in 1979. It was renamed Central Plaza in 2017 when the Central Bank of Ireland moved to North Wall Quay.

The independent metal record label Sentinel Records was founded in 2000 and has one of its locations on Cope Street.

Ireland's last independent stockbroker, Campbell O'Connor was located at 8 Cope Street until 2019 marking the end of era of the area as a financial district.

An 18-month project to improve Dublin's Temple Bar square area began in 2023, covering 2,400 m^{2} (0.59 acres), including Cope Street.

== Notable residents ==
The artist Francis Robert West lived on Cope Street in 1770–71.

In the 19th century, the folklorist Patrick Kennedy was based on the corner of Anglesea Street and Cope Street.

== Cultural references ==
Cope Street appears in the work of James Joyce:

And one time [Leopold Bloom] led ["the old one"'s nephew] the rounds of Dublin and, by the holy farmer, he never cried crack till he brought him home as drunk as a boiled owl and he said he did it to teach him the evils of alcohol and by herrings, if the three women didn’t near roast him, it’s a queer story, the old one, Bloom’s wife and Mrs O’Dowd that kept the hotel. Jesus, I had to laugh at pisser Burke taking them off chewing the fat. And Bloom with his but don’t you see? and but on the other hand. And sure, more be token, the lout I’m told was in Power’s after, the blender’s, round in Cope street going home footless in a cab five times in the week after drinking his way through all the samples in the bloody establishment. Phenomenon!

— Ulysses

John T. Power was a wholesale spirit merchant at 18 Cope Street in 1904, when Ulysses is set.

The James Joyce-themed hotel Bloom's opened in 1980 on part of the site of the former Jury's Hotel on College Green. This section was built as an 80 room extension in 1965 with the original main hotel being closed and demolished in the late 1970s. The original hotel on College Green was opened by William Jury in 1839 and later gave his name to the Jurys Inn chain.

== Gallery ==
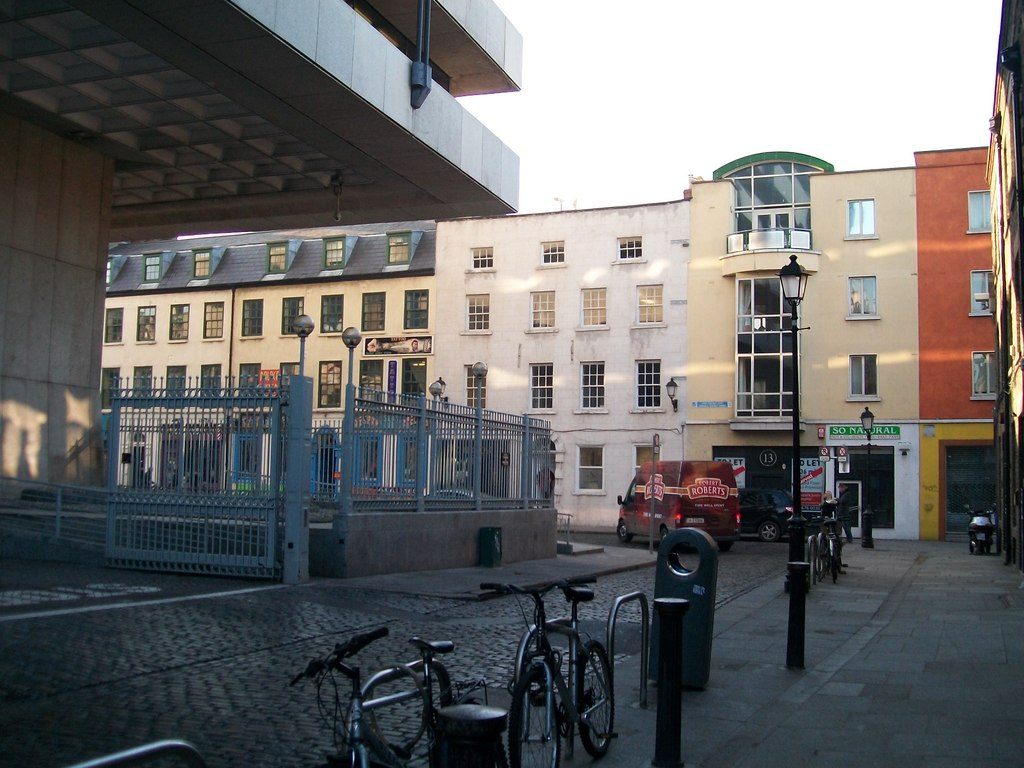
West end facing Fownes St Upper

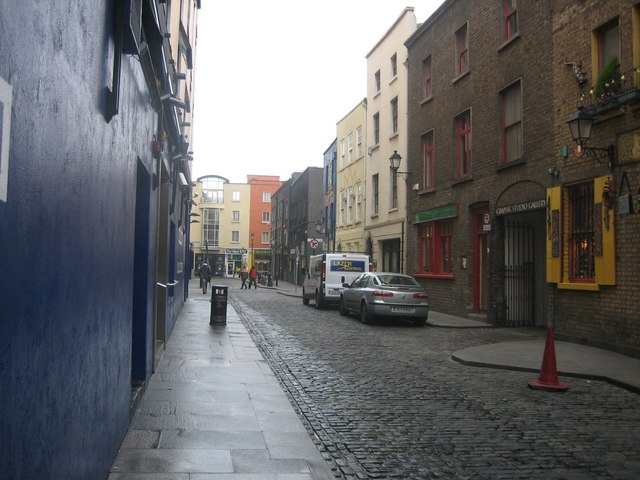
View of setts

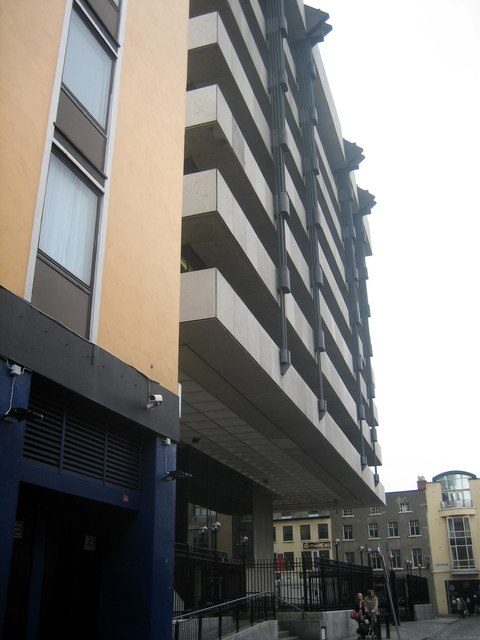
Central Plaza facing Cope St

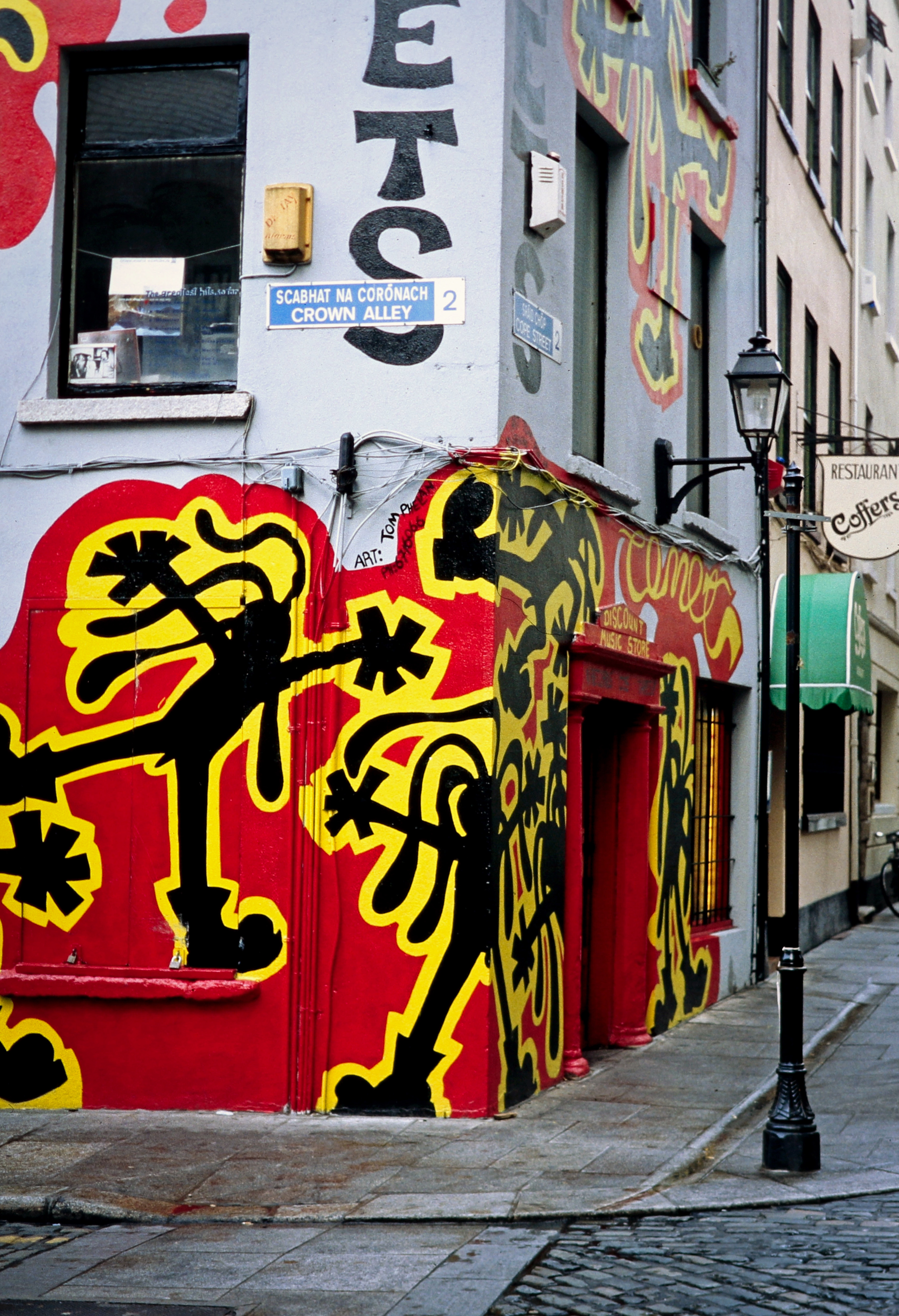
Street art at the junction of Crown Alley and Cope St

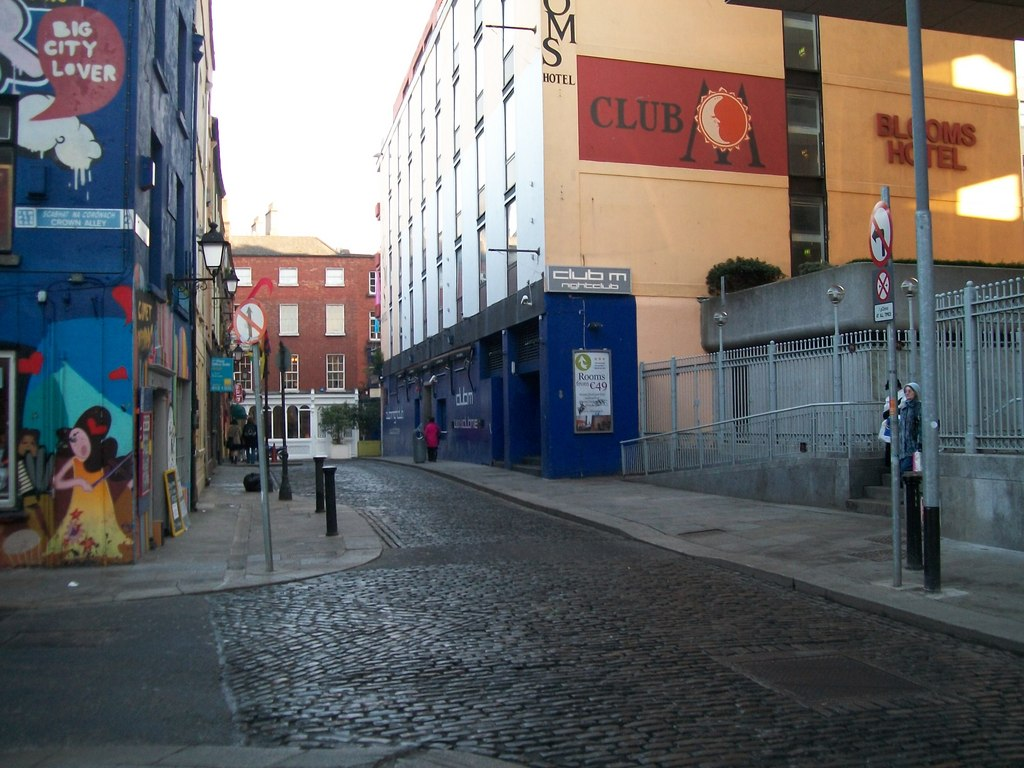
Eastern half

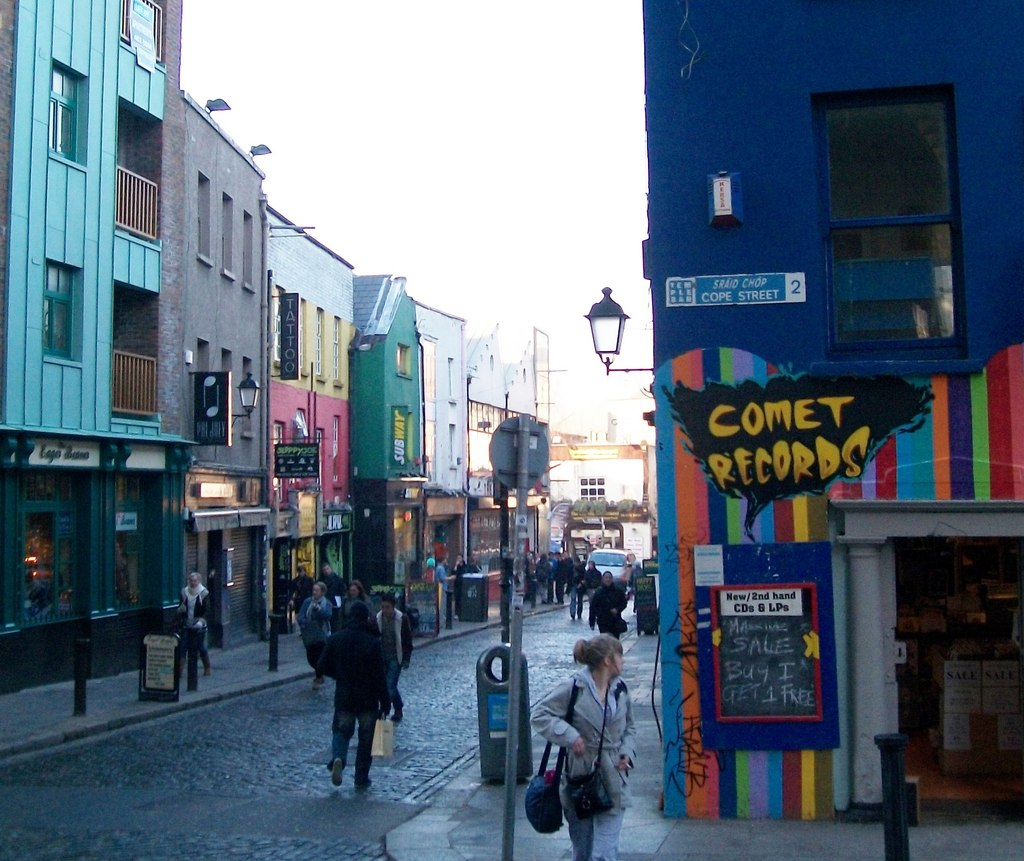
Comet Records on the corner with Crown Alley

== See also ==
- List of streets and squares in Dublin
