= William Fownes =

William Fownes may refer to:

- William C. Fownes Jr. (1877–1950), American golfer
- Sir William Fownes, 1st Baronet (died 1735), MP for Wicklow
- Sir William Fownes, 2nd Baronet (1709–1778), MP for Dingle, Knocktopher and Wicklow

== See also ==
- Fownes (surname)
