= Delkiow Sivy =

Cornish folk song

Delkiow Sivy ("Strawberry Leaves" in Cornish (Kernewek)) is a Cornish folk song.

A young maiden is on her way to pick strawberry leaves which, so the song alleges, make young girls pretty. She meets a travelling tailor, who seeks to seduce her. "Who will clothe the child?" asks the young man. "Ah, but his father will be a tailor," the maiden concludes. The repeated refrain "fair face and yellow hair" probably alludes to the traditional view of female beauty.

The original 'Late' Cornish version of "Delyow Syvy" can be found in both Inglis Gundry's 1966 Canow Kernow: Songs and Dances from Cornwall and in Peter Kennedy's 1997 Folksongs of Britain and Ireland. It has been suggested that the song is a Cornish version of the song "Sweet Nightingale".

In her 2011 book Celtic Myth and Religion, Paice MacLeod claims that there are no surviving traditional Cornish songs and that the song was borrowed from England and sung in Cornish. A Unified Cornish version titled "Delyo Syvy" appears, however, on the 1975 Sentinel Records album Starry-Gazey Pie, by Cornish folk singer Brenda Wootton, with accompaniment by Robert Bartlett. The sleeve notes claim that the song is "the only living remnant" of the Cornish language and that it "has never been translated into English".

== Lyrics ==
Delkiow Sivy (Modern Cornish)

Peleah ero why a moaz, moze fettow teag
Gen agoz pedn due ha goz bleaw mellin?

Me a moaz than venton sarra wheag
Rag delkiow sivy ra muzzy teag

Pe ve moaz gena why moze fettow teag
Gen agoz pedn due ha goz bleaw mellin?

Grew mar meno why sarra wheag
Rag delkiow sivy ra muzzy teag

Fatla gwra ve agoz gurra why en doar
Gen agoz pedn due ha goz bleaw mellin?

Me vedn saval arta sarra wheag
Rag delkiow sivy ra muzzy teag

Fatla gwra ve agoz dry why gen floh
Gen agoz pedn due ha goz bleaw mellin?

Me vedn e thone sarra wheag
Rag delkiow sivy ra muzzy teag

Pew vedo why gawas rag seera rag goz floh
Gen agoz pedn due ha goz bleaw mellin?

Why ra boaz e seera, sarra wheag
Rag delkiow sivy ra muzzy teag

Pandra vedo why geel rag ledno rag goz floh
Gen agoz pedn due ha goz bleaw mellin?

E seera veath troher sarra wheag
Rag delkiow sivy ra muzzy teag

Delyow Sevi (Kernewek Kemmyn)

Ple'th esowgh-hwi ow-mos, mowes vludh ha teg
Gans agas bejeth gwynn, ha'gas blew melyn?

My a vynn mos dhe'n venten, syrra hweg
Rag delyow sevi a wra mowesi teg.

A allav-vy mos genowgh hwi, mowes, vludh ha teg
Gans agas bejeth gwynn, ha'gas blew melyn?

Gwrewgh mar mynnowgh-hwi, syrra hweg
Rag delyow sevi a wra mowesi teg.

Fatel vydh mar kwrav-vy agas gorra-hwi y'n dor,
Gans agas bejeth gwynn, ha'gas blew melyn?

My a vynn sevel arta, syrra hweg,
Rag delyow sevi a wra mowesi teg.

Fatel vydh mar kwrav-vy agas dri-hwi gans flogh,
Gans agas bejeth gwynn, ha'gas blew melyn?

My a vynn y dhoen, syrra hweg,
Rag delyow sevi a wra mowesi teg.

Piw a vynnowgh-hwi kavoes rag syrra rag'as flogh,
Gans agas bejeth gwynn, ha'gas blew melyn?

Hwi a vydh y syrra, syrra hweg,
Rag delyow sevi a wra mowesi teg.

Pandr'a vynnowgh-hwi kavoes rag lennow rag'as flogh
Gans agas bejeth gwynn, ha'gas blew melyn?

Y das a vydh tregher, syrra hweg
Rag delyow sevi a wra mowesi teg.

== Translation ==
Where are you going, pretty maid,
with your white face and your yellow hair?

I'm going to the spring, kind sir,
for strawberry leaves make maidens fair.

I'll go with you, pretty maid,
with your white face and your yellow hair?

If you want to, kind sir,
for strawberry leaves make maidens fair.

What if I get you on the ground, pretty maid,
with your white face and your yellow hair?

I'll jump up again, kind sir,
for strawberry leaves make maidens fair.

What if I get you with child, pretty maid,
with your white face and your yellow hair?

I will bear him, kind sir,
for strawberry leaves make maidens fair.

Who will you get to be the father for your child, pretty maid
with your white face and your yellow hair?

You will be his father, kind sir,
for strawberry leaves make maidens fair.

What will you do for clothes for your child?
with your white face and your yellow hair?

His father will be a tailor, kind sir,
for strawberry leaves make maidens fair.
