= Fownes =

Fownes is a surname. Notable people with the surname include:

- William Fownes (disambiguation), multiple people
- George Fownes (1815–1849), British chemist
- Rich Fownes (born 1983), English musician
- Richard Fownes (1652–1714), English politician
- Fownes baronets
