= Samuel Walter Whitshed =

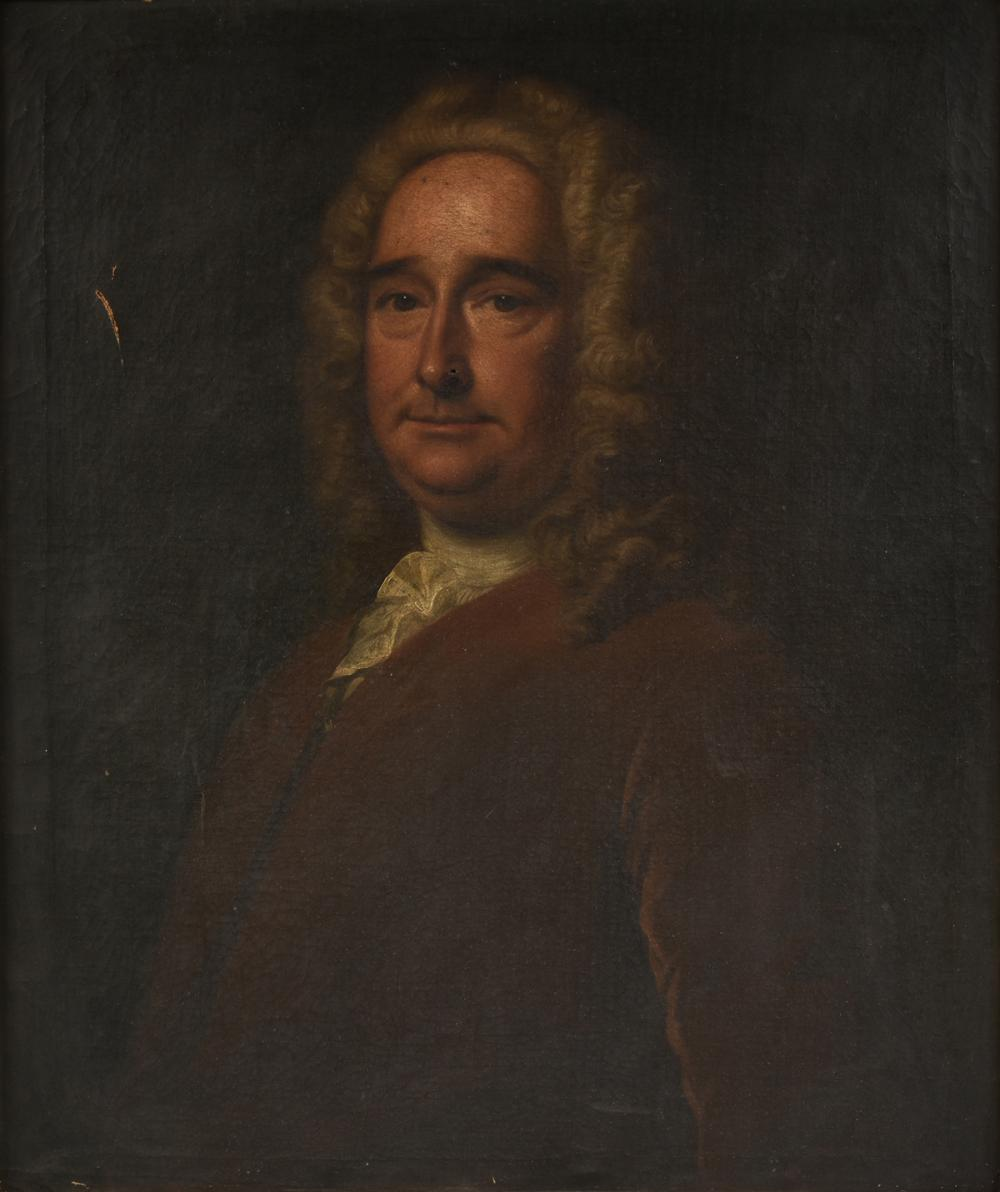
Brigadier General Samuel Walter Whitshed

Samuel Walter Whitshed (1685 – March 1746) was an Anglo-Irish British Army officer and politician.

== Biography ==
Whitshed was born in Dublin, a younger son of Thomas Whitshed (1645–1697) and Mary Quin. Among his thirteen siblings was William Whitshed, who would serve as Lord Chief Justice of Ireland.

In 1715, Whitshed was elected to the Irish House of Commons as a Member of Parliament for Wicklow. He held the seat until 1746. Between 1740 and 1743, Whitshed was regimental colonel of 39th (Dorsetshire) Regiment of Foot, before serving as colonel of the 12th Royal Lancers from 1743 until his death.

Parliament of Ireland
Preceded by Henry Percy; Joshua Dawson	Member of Parliament for Wicklow; 1715–1746; With: Richard Edwards (1715–1723); James Whitshed (1723–1735); Thomas Theaker (1735–1746)	Succeeded by Thomas Theaker; James Whitshed
