= Hotel Partners =

Irish based hotel group

- Industry: Hotel ownership and management
- Headquarters: Dublin 2, Ireland
- Area served: Ireland
- Key people: Michael Holland, chairman and CEO; Brian Savage, CFO
- Website: www.hotelpartners.ie

Hotel Partners is an independent hotel group which owns and operates hotels across the island of Ireland.

It currently operates three hotels across Ireland, including the five-star Fitzwilliam Hotel Dublin, the Fitzwilliam Hotel Belfast and Townhouse on The Green, Dublin.

== Notable hotels and bars owned and operated by Hotel Partners ==
- The Bailey Bar, Dublin 2
- The Fitzwilliam Hotel Dublin, Dublin 2
- The Fitzwilliam Hotel Belfast, Belfast
- Glover's Alley Restaurant, Dublin 2
- Townhouse on The Green, Dublin 2
- Floritz Restaurant, Dublin 2
- Cellar 22, Dublin 2
