= Sentinel Records =

- Founded: 2000
- Founder: BT
- Status: Active
- Distributor(s): ?
- Genre: Heavy metal; hard rock; death metal; doom metal; extreme metal
- Country of origin: Ireland
- Location: Dublin, Ireland
- Official website: www.sentinelrecords.com

Sentinel Records (Sentinel) is an independent record label & webstore. Previously a record store based in Temple Bar, Dublin, Ireland, in two locations, Cope Street & Upper Fownes Street. Sentinel was founded in August 2000 with the initial intention of releasing a compilation of Irish Metal bands from across the country and then to continue to develop into a Record Label. An Irish Metal mail-order was established to stock and sell everything released by Irish Metal bands from demos to CDs and LPs and also stock shirts, fanzines and any other related merchandise. Later this was expanded to world-wide metal and an on-line store was created. The webstore and label has had somewhat of a resurrection in recent years and expanded their stock greatly.

In December 2004 Sentinel Records, the shop, opened for business at Cope Street, the old premises of Comet Records, Temple Bar, Dublin 2 and later moved to the basement of Flip in Fownes Street Upper, Dublin 2. The record store closed for good on 10 June 2010 although Sentinel Records was involved in Into The Void Records, from 11 February 2001 to 30 December 2014.

== Releases ==
GOK001 : V/A - In Unison - DCD
GOK002 : Abaddon Incarnate - Nadir - CD
GOK003 : Mourning Beloveth - Dust - CD
GOK004 : Abaddon Incarnate - Dark Crusade - CD
GOK005 : Mourning Beloveth / Lunar Gate - Picture disc 7"
GOK006 : Primordial / Mael Mordha - Picture disc 7"
GOK007 : Scavenger - Madness to our Method - CD
GOK008 : Arcane Sun - Arcane Sun - to be released
GOK009 : Mourning Beloveth / Wreck Of The Hesperus (band) - 10"
GOK010 : Sol Axis – ... To Mark The Ages – CD
GOK011 : For Ruin - December - CD
GOK012 : Primordial - The Gathering Wilderness - Picture disc LP
GOK013 : Morphosis – Rise of the Bastard Deities - CD
GOK014 : Mourning Beloveth – Somnolent Harmony – DMC
GOK003LP : Mourning Beloveth - Dust - DLP
GOK015 : Pagan Altar – Mythical & Magical – MC
GOK016 : Asphyxia – Conflagration – MC
GOK017 : On Pain Of Death – Year Naught Doom – LP
GOK018 : Pagan Altar – Lords of Hypocrisy – MC
GOK019 : Pagan Altar – Judgement of the Dead – MC
GOK020 : Graveyard Dirt – Of Romance & Fire – 10″
GOK021 : Graveyard Dirt – Shadows of Old Ghosts – 12″
GOK022 : Solstice – To Sol a Thane – MC
GOK023 : Solstice – Lamentations – MC
GOK024 : Solstice – Halcyon – MC
GOK025 : Solstice – New Dark Age – MC
GOK026 : Solstice – Death's Crown Is Victory – MCC
GOK027 : Solstice – Never Surrender – MC Boxset
GOK028 : Apostate Viaticum – Before the Gates of Gomorrah – MC
GOK029 : Arcane Sun – Arcane Sun - LP
GOK003LPX : Mourning Beloveth - Dust - DLP
GOK030 : Primordial - Imrama - Picture Disc LP

== Artists ==
Abaddon Incarnate
Apostate Viaticum
Arcane Sun
Asphyxia
For Ruin
Graveyard Dirt
Lunar Gate
Mael Mórdha
Morphosis
Mourning Beloveth
On Pain of Death
Pagan Altar
Primordial
Scavenger
Sol Axis
Solstice
Wreck Of The Hesperus
