= Fownes baronets =

Extinct baronetcy in the Baronetage of Ireland

The Fownes Baronetcy, of Dublin, was a title in the Baronetage of Ireland. It was created on 26 October 1724 for William Fownes, High Sheriff of Wicklow in 1707, Lord Mayor of Dublin in 1708, and member of the Irish House of Commons for Wicklow (1704–1713).

The second Baronet represented Dingle and Wicklow in the Irish Parliament and was admitted to the Irish Privy Council in 1761. The title became extinct on his death in 1778.

== Fownes baronets, of Dublin (1724) ==
- Sir William Fownes, 1st Baronet (died 1735)
- Sir William Fownes, 2nd Baronet (1709–1778)
