= Sweet Nightingale =

Cornish folk song

Sweet Nightingale, also known as Down in those valleys below, is a Cornish folk song. The Roud number is 371.

According to Robert Bell, who published it in his 1846 Ancient Poems, Ballads and Songs of the Peasantry of England, the song "may be confidently assigned to the seventeenth century, [and] is said to be a translation from the Cornish language. We first heard it in Germany, in the pleasure-gardens of the Marienberg, on the Moselle. The singers were four Cornish miners, who were at that time, 1854, employed at some lead mines near the town of Zell. The leader or 'Captain,' John Stocker, said that the song was an established favourite with the lead miners of Cornwall and Devonshire, and was always sung on the pay-days, and at the wakes; and that his grandfather, who died thirty years before, at the age of a hundred years, used to sing the song, and say that it was very old."

Inglis Gundry included it in his 1966 book Canow Kernow: Songs and Dances from Cornwall. The tune was collected by Rev. Sabine Baring-Gould from E. G. Stevens of St Ives, Cornwall. According to Gundry, Baring-Gould "tells us that 'a good many old men in Cornwall' gave him this song 'and always to the same air', which may explain why it is still so widespread. 'They assert,' he continues, 'that it is a duet'."

The narrative of the song is somewhat similar to the Cornish language song Delkiow Sivy.

== Lyrics ==
‘My sweetheart, come along!
Don’t you hear the fond song,
The sweet notes of the nightingale flow?
Don’t you hear the fond tale
Of the sweet nightingale,
As she sings in those valleys below?
So be not afraid
To walk in the shade,
Nor yet in those valleys below,
Nor yet in those valleys below.

‘Pretty Betsy, don’t fail,
For I’ll carry your pail,
Safe home to your cot as we go;
You shall hear the fond tale
Of the sweet nightingale,
As she sings in those valleys below.’
But she was afraid
To walk in the shade,
To walk in those valleys below,
To walk in those valleys below.

‘Pray let me alone,
I have hands of my own;
Along with you I will not go,
To hear the fond tale
Of the sweet nightingale,
As she sings in those valleys below;
For I am afraid
To walk in the shade,
To walk in those valleys below,
To walk in those valleys below.’

‘Pray sit yourself down
With me on the ground,
On this bank where sweet primroses grow;
You shall hear the fond tale
Of the sweet nightingale,
As she sings in those valleys below;
So be not afraid
To walk in the shade,
Nor yet in those valleys below,
Nor yet in those valleys below.’

This couple agreed;
They were married with speed,
And soon to the church they did go.
She was no more afraid
For to walk in the shade,
Nor yet in those valleys below:
Nor to hear the fond tale
Of the sweet nightingale,
As she sung in those valleys below,
As she sung in those valleys below.
