= Dublin 2 =

Dublin 2 (D2) Baile Átha Cliath 2
- Postal district
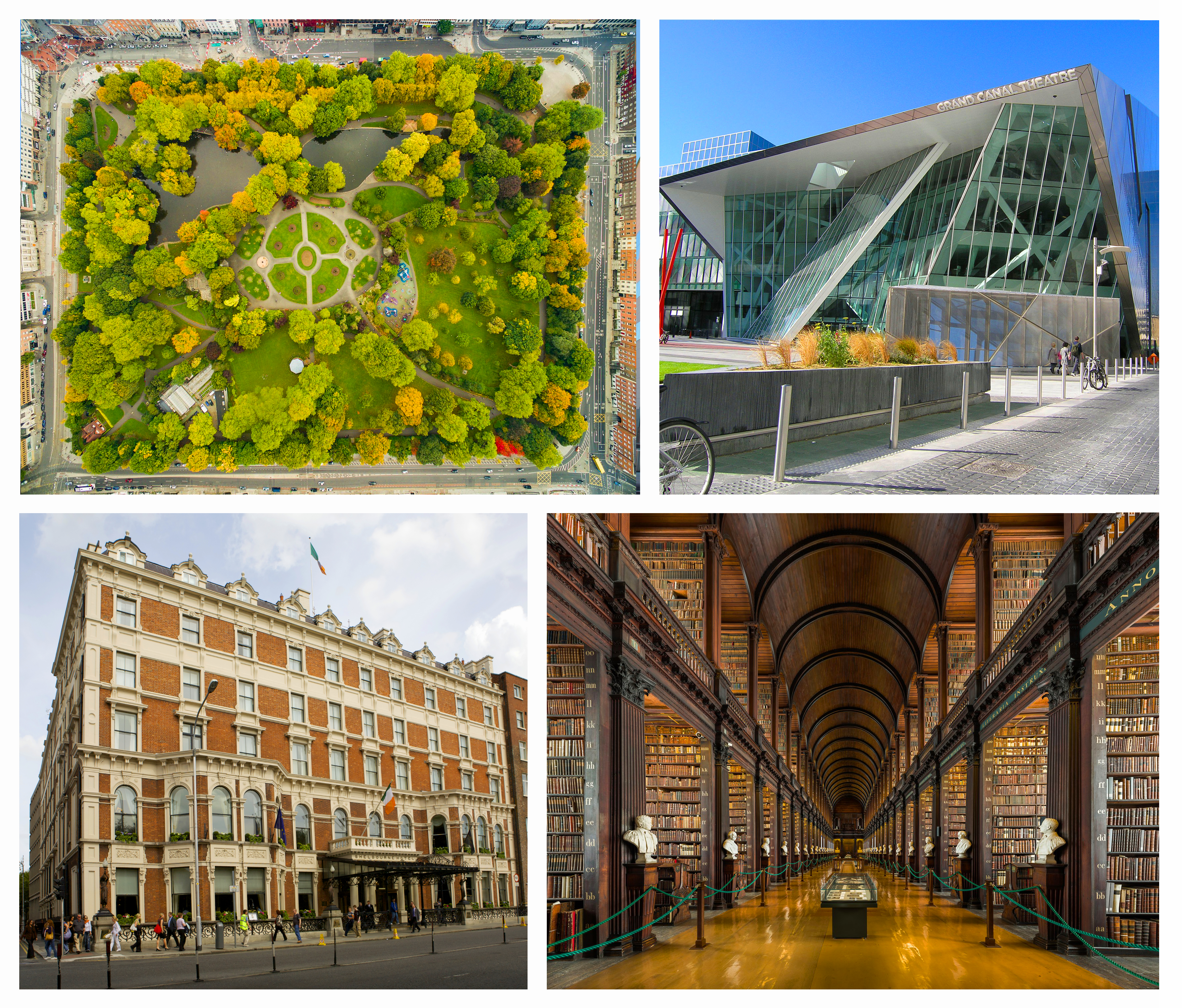
- Clockwise from top: St Stephen's Green, the Grand Canal Theatre, the library at Trinity College, the Shelbourne Hotel
- Country: Ireland
- Province: Leinster
- Local Authority: Dublin City Council
- Dáil constituency: Dublin Bay South
- EP constituency: Dublin
- Postal district(s): D2/D02
- Dialing code: 01, +353 1

Dublin 2, also rendered as D2 and D02, is a postal district on the southside of Dublin, Ireland. In the 1960s, this central district became a focus for office development. More recently, it became a focus for urban residential development. The district saw some of the heaviest fighting during Ireland's Easter Rising.

== Area profile ==
Dublin 2 is in the Dáil constituency of Dublin Bay South. The postcode consists of most of the southern city centre and its outer edges. It is the most affluent of the four postcodes that make up the bulk of inner city Dublin. The others being Dublin 1, Dublin 7, and Dublin 8. It is also among the most affluent of all 22 traditional Dublin postal districts and is one of the most affluent in the country.

== Notable places ==
Dublin 2 includes Merrion Square, Trinity College, Temple Bar, Grafton Street, St Stephen's Green, Dame Street, and Leeson Street. It is home to several government departments and addresses such as Leinster House, Government Buildings, and the Mansion House.

== Usage in Dublin addresses ==
The postal district forms the first part of numerous seven-digit Eircodes that are unique to every single address in the area. For addressing purposes, it appears in both its original form as Dublin 2 and as the first part of a seven digit postal code as D02 a line below. For example:

Dublin City Council
Lord Mayor's Office
Mansion House
Dawson Street
Dublin 2
D02 AF30

== General Letter Office for Ireland ==
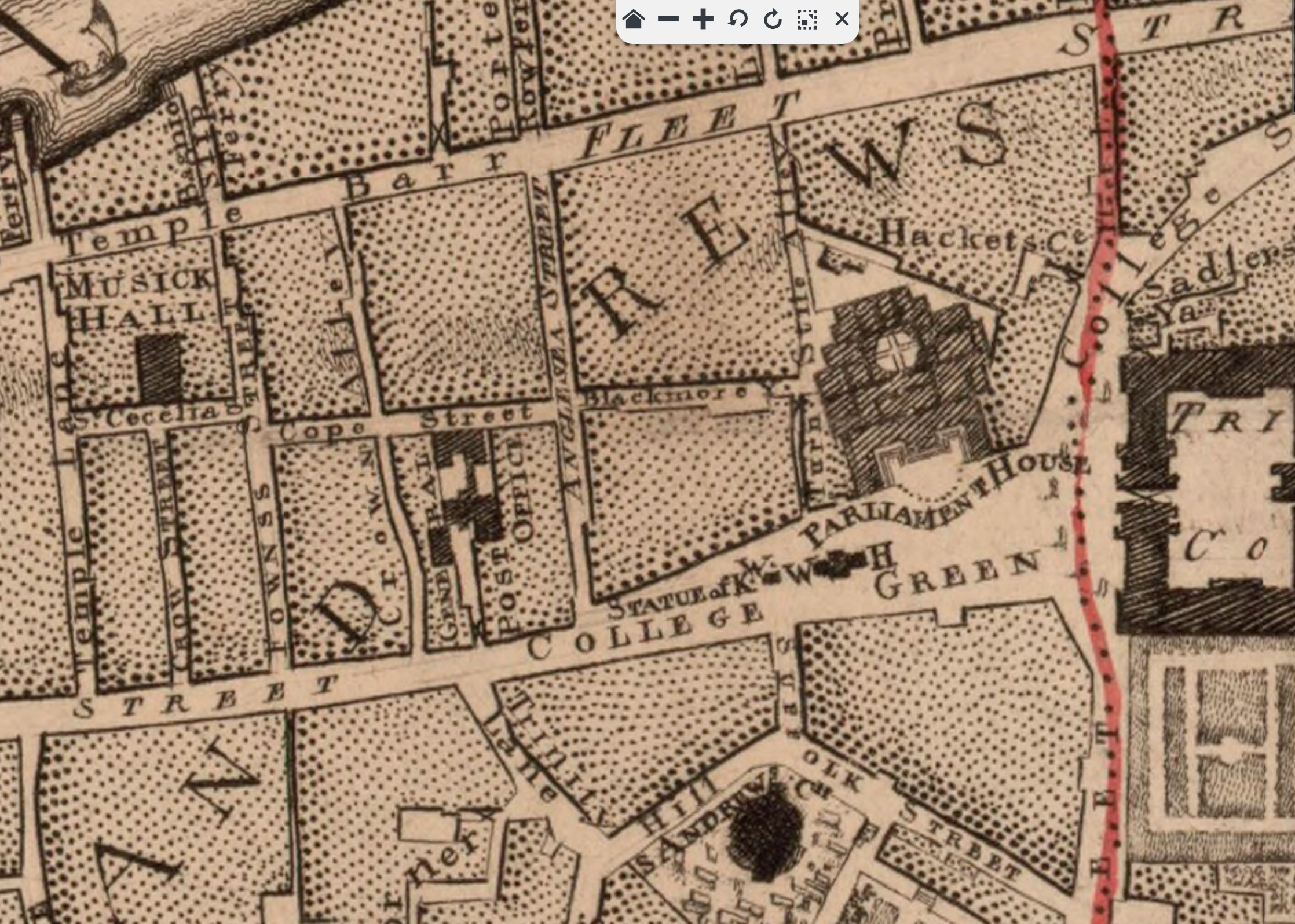
Map showing Dublin's General Post Office in the Cope Street area in 1757, the previous location of the Central Bank of Ireland now the Central Plaza (Dublin)

Ireland's main post office was centered in the current postal district, Dublin 2, for over 100 years. In the seventeenth century the post office's letter office had followed the commercial centre of the city from the Dublin Castle area further west to a building in High Street backing onto Back Lane in 1668 and then to Fishamble Street, on the western border of Dublin 2 during the reign of Charles II. Around 1709 the letter office had moved closer to College Green, to Sycamore Alley, parallel to Crane Lane, known as Old Post-Office Yards. For 21 years, 1755 until 1771, Bardin's Chocolate House in Fownes' Court was rented along with other buildings on the site where the Central Bank of Ireland was located between 1979 and 2017 and is now Central Plaza.

The move to the heart of Dublin 2 in College Green, opposite the Irish Parliament House that became the Bank of Ireland in 1803, took place in 1771 but proved to be too small for the expanding mail demands even with renting more buildings in Suffolk Street over time. The cost of ground rent and rent were so high that, in 1810, the Post Office bought the College Green buildings. The following year it was decided to move to Upper Sackville Street claiming they needed more space and the cost of buying all the Suffolk Street property, demolish and rebuild appropriately with the College Green building would cost about £34,000. Other reasons were cited to move and build the first purpose-built post office in Ireland were that, all mail coaches travelled out of Dublin on the north side of the Liffey except for the Wicklow mail coach and needed more space than College Green, and it also would be more convenient to deliver mail to directors and officials at their homes because many lived north of the river. The opening of the Francis Johnston designed GPO, at a cost of £50,000, on 6 January 1818, saw the end of an era of the Dublin 2 area as the post office's 100 plus years in the area.

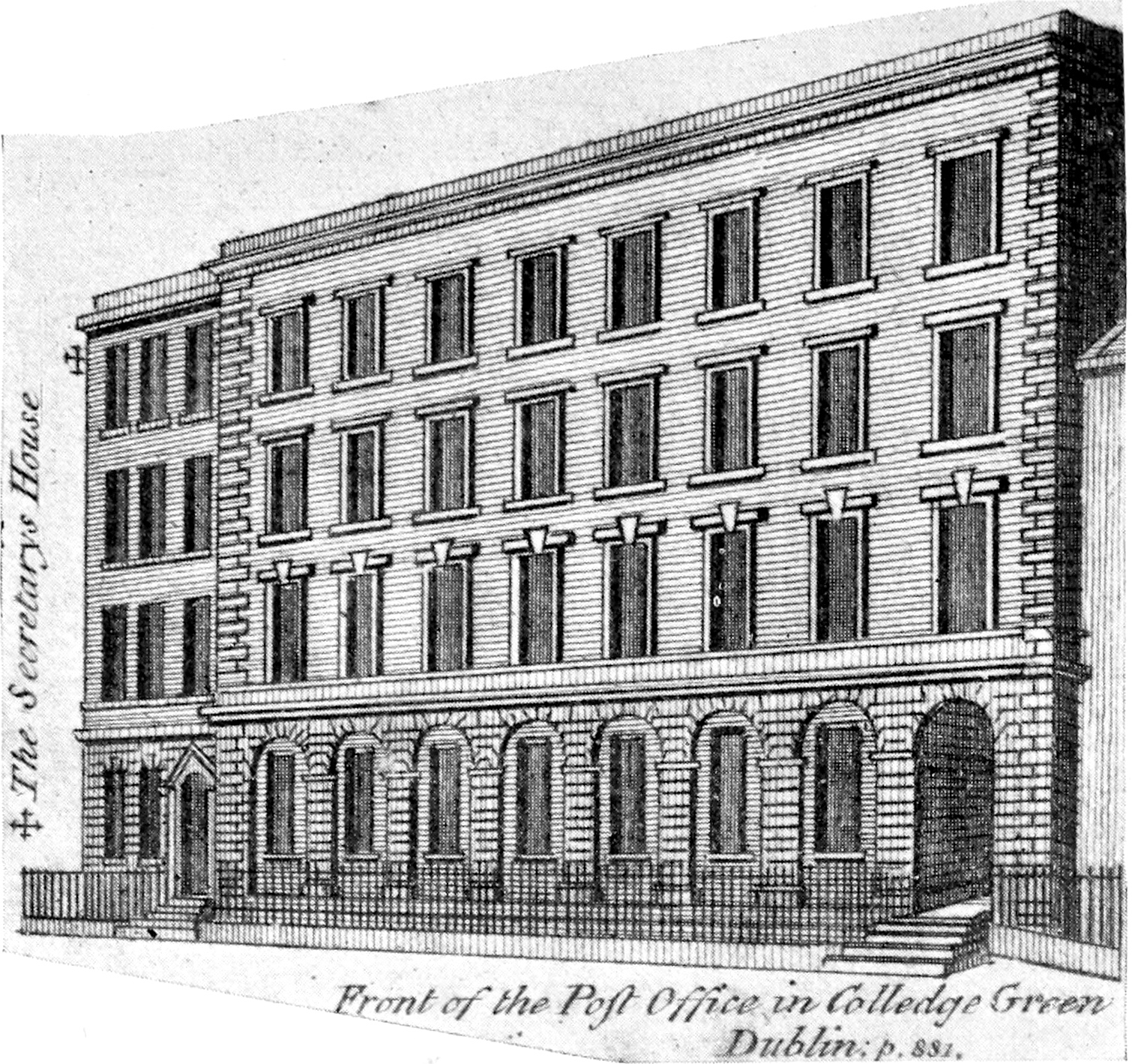
Illustration of GPO in College Green with PO secretary's house on the left side

Alongside, but entirely separate from the General Post Office, from September 1773 there existed a local penny post system that was authorised by the Postage Act 1765. Known as the Dublin Penny Post, six sub-post offices, out of a total of eighteen initial locations, often in grocers and booksellers and called receiving houses, were set up in the future Dublin 2 area at: Anne Street, Castle Street, Clare Street, Cuff Street, Ship Street and George's Quay. The mail collected was brought to an office in the courtyard of the General Post Office for local delivery, or for forwarding outside the penny post area.

Even though the General Post Office had moved away, many penny post receiving houses had been opened and when the penny post was absorbed into the general postal system in 1831 around 30 locations had been opened, though some had also been closed. Those that remained would become sub-post offices. Within a few years of the establishment of the state, the 1929-30 Post Office Guide lists the following Dublin City offices within the area:

- An Dail
- Aungier Street
- Camden Street
- Clare Street
- College Green
- Dame Street
- Duke Street
- Harcourt Street
- Lower Baggot Street
- Lower Leeson Street
- Lower Mount Street
- Merrion Row
- Molesworth Street
- Pearse Street No. 38
- Pearse Street No. 72
- St Stephen's Green West
- Stock Exchange
- Upper Baggot Street
- Upper Leeson Street
- Westland Row Station
- Westmoreland Street

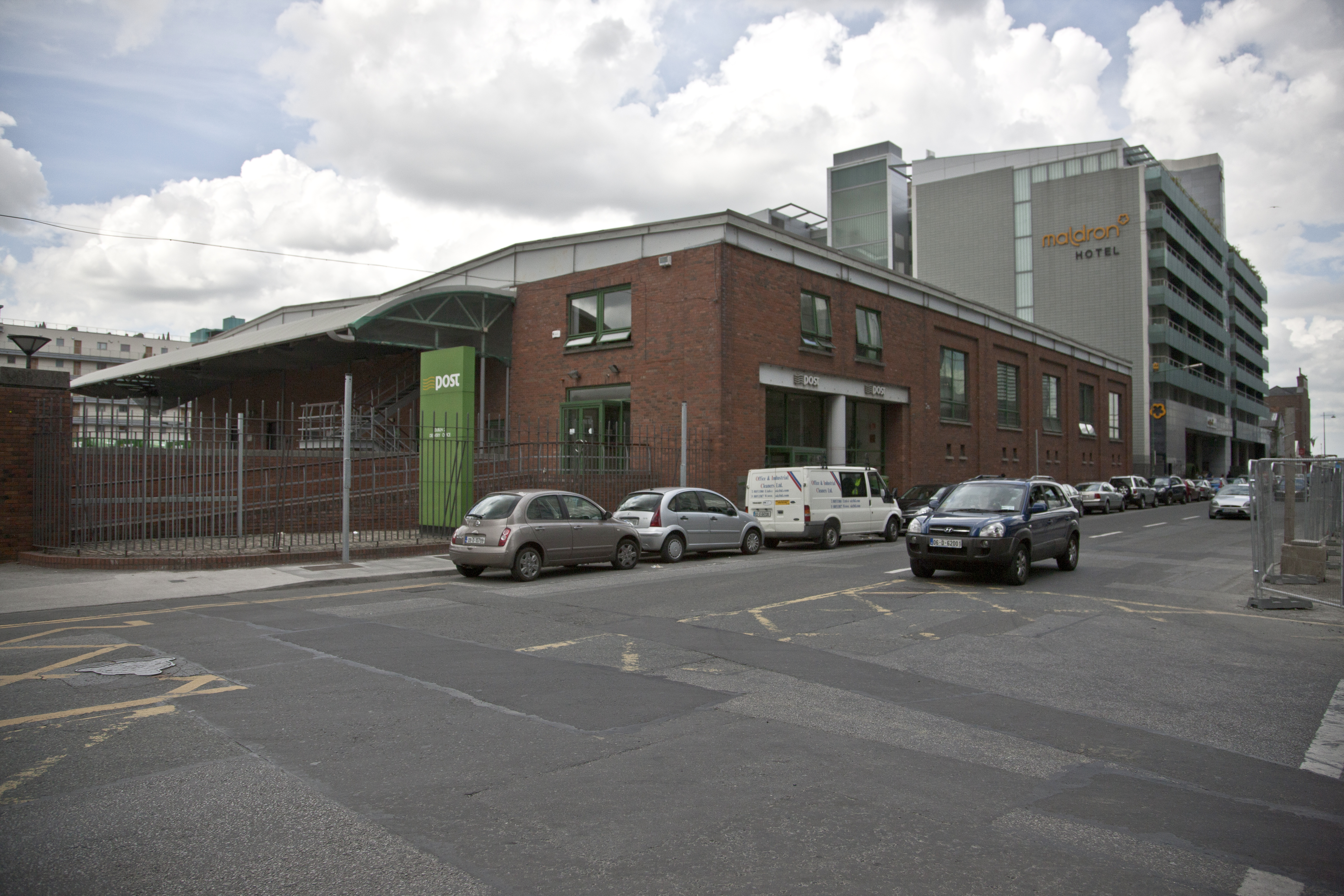
Cardiff Lane Sorting Office in 2010

Pearse Street Sorting Office was opened in 1925 as the country's primary mail sorting location, situated on the corner of Pearse Street and Sandwich Street in an old distillery building. Staff complained about the work conditions there over its 42-year use, because of space constraints, the roof leaking tar due to the summer heat and rain in winter on workers below, paper dust, etc., such that the subject was raised in Dáil Éireann on a number of occasions. The sorting office had direct access to Westland Row station where trains departed to connect with the Dun Laoghaire to Holyhead mail boat for onward transmission to Great Britain and foreign destinations. It was eventually closed in August 1967 when a new sorting office opened in Sheriff Street with direct access to Connolly station. That facility was closed in 1994 and a new Dublin Service Unit opened on 17 February 1994 in Cardiff Lane, in the Dublin 2 section of the Dublin Docklands redevelopment. This operated until 2017 when its functions were removed from Dublin 2. The building was demolished and a new 28,000 sq meter commercial development called The Sorting Office was built.

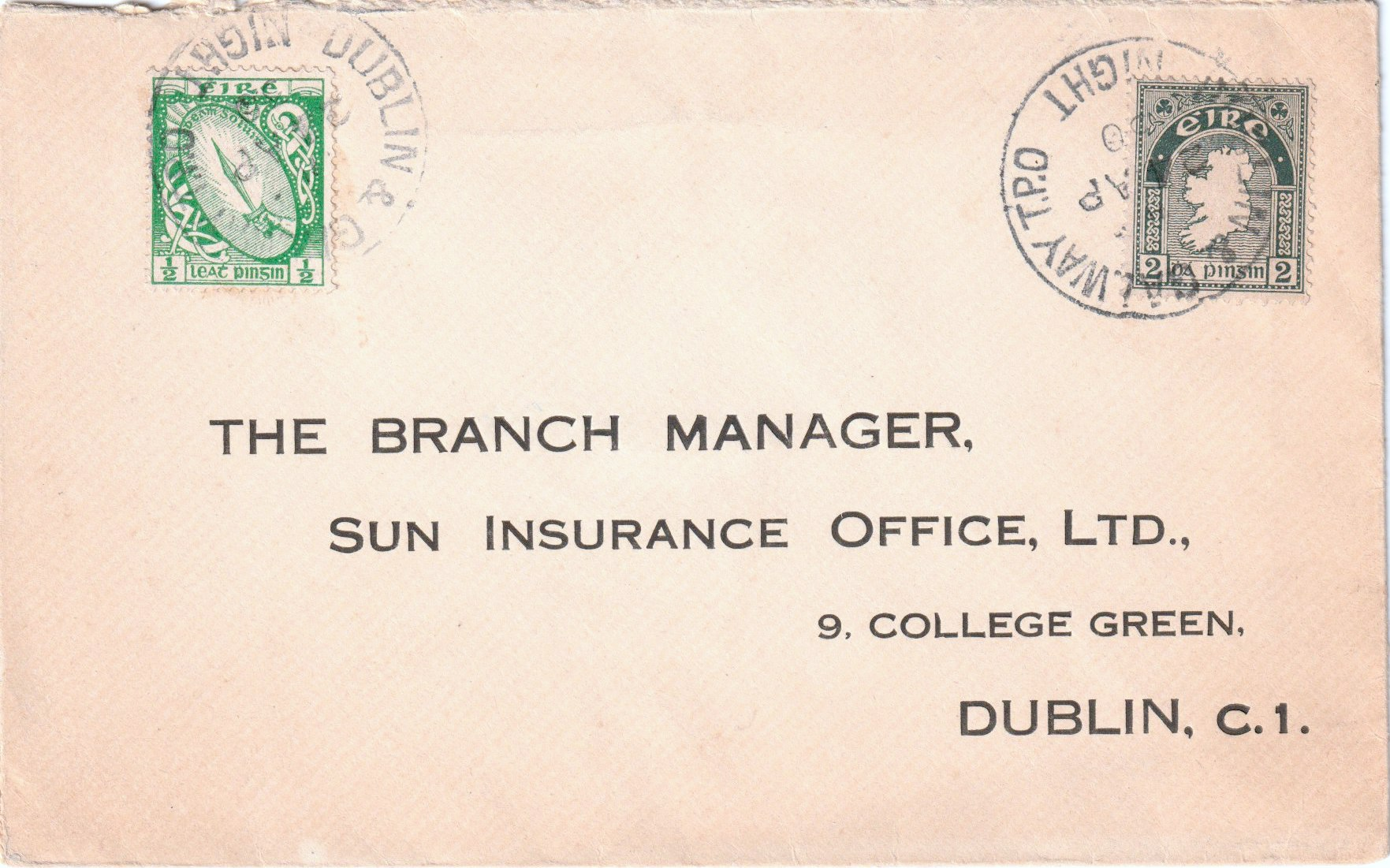
A 1930 letter posted to a C1 coded address, mailed on the Dublin & Galway Travelling Post Office with the appropriate half-pence late fee

Five years after the establishment of the state, in 1927, the Department of Posts and Telegraphs initiated a scheme that requested senders to add a code to each address in Dublin City and suburbs. When addressed in English the letter C with an appropriate number denoted the postman's walk where the letters were to be delivered, such as, College Green was C1 while Grafton Street was C3. The scheme was not popular and became defunct. The Dublin postal districts number were introduced in 1961 as "Dublin 2" in this south city area.

A dedicated post office was built in St Andrew's Street in 1948 to replace the one in Church Lane. Designed by the Office of Public Works architects Sidney Maskell and John Fox as a Branch Office, it is one of Dublin's busiest post offices. It is a seven-bay four-storey building with granite cladding and extensive windows with strong horizontal features had been influenced by modernist architecture. It is listed as a protected structure and was sold in 2022 for €9.5 million and, under a 25-year lease, An Post have retained the ground floor and part of the basement.

== Gallery ==
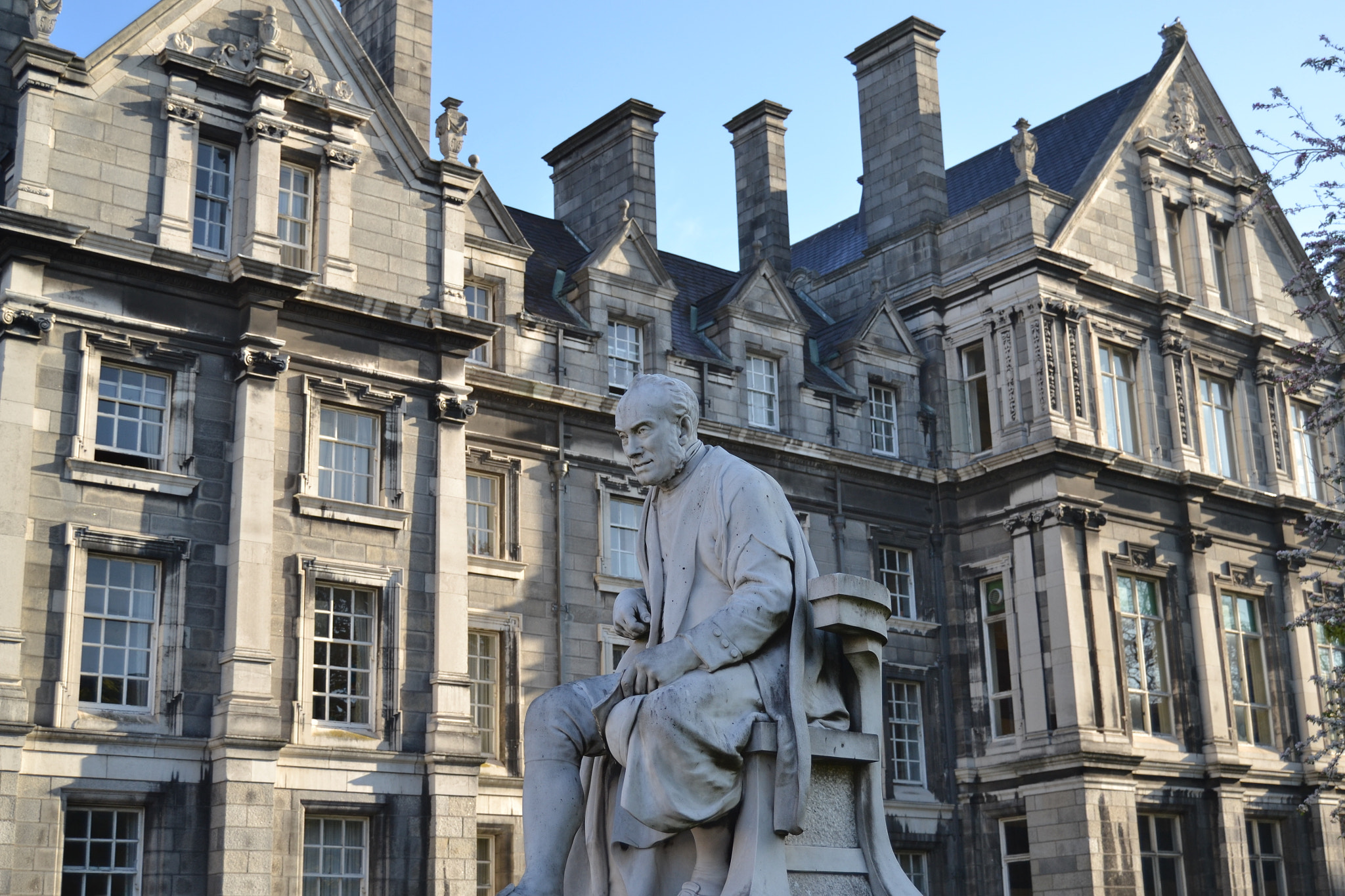
The campus of Trinity College Dublin

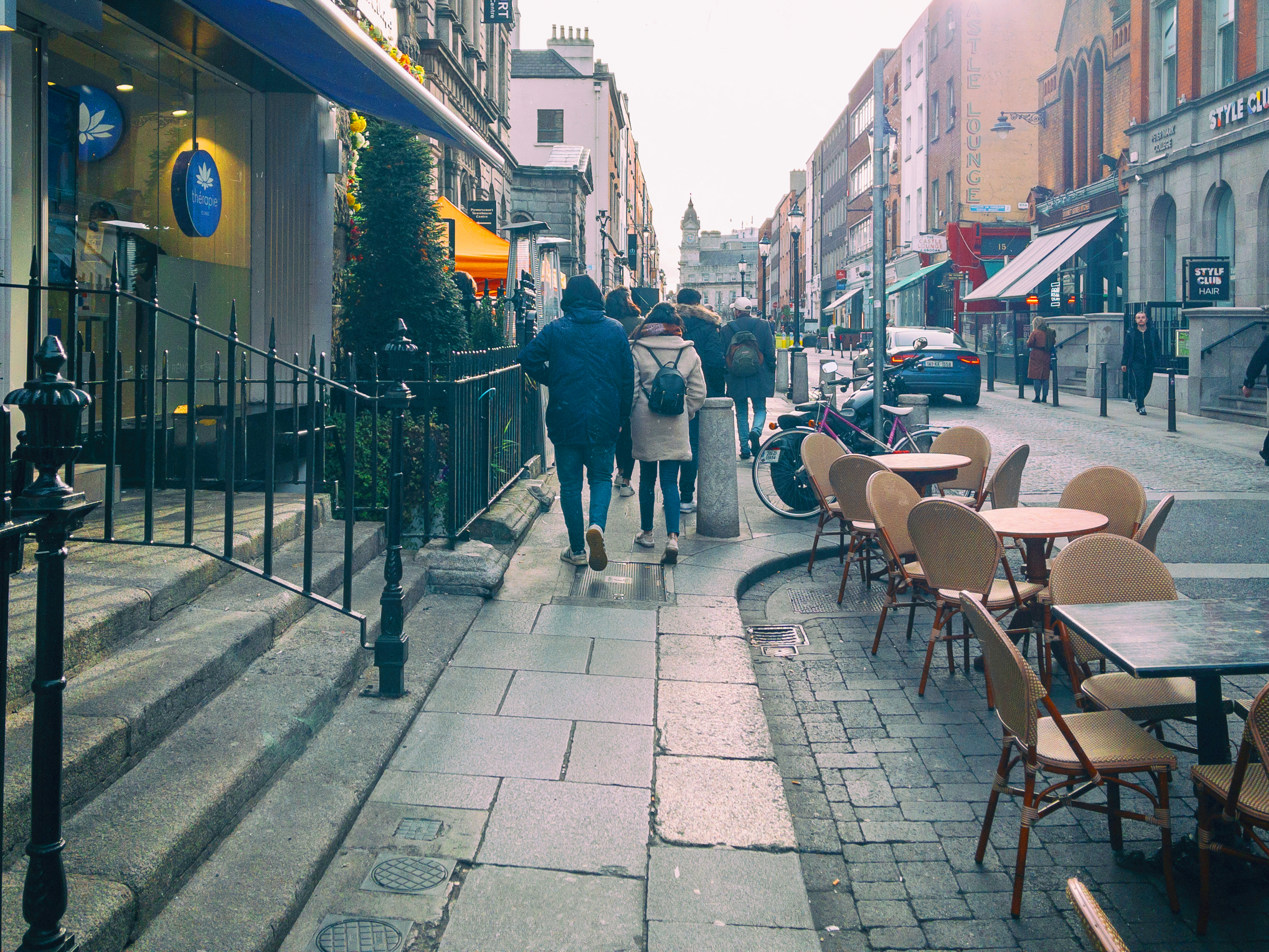
Cafes along South William Street.

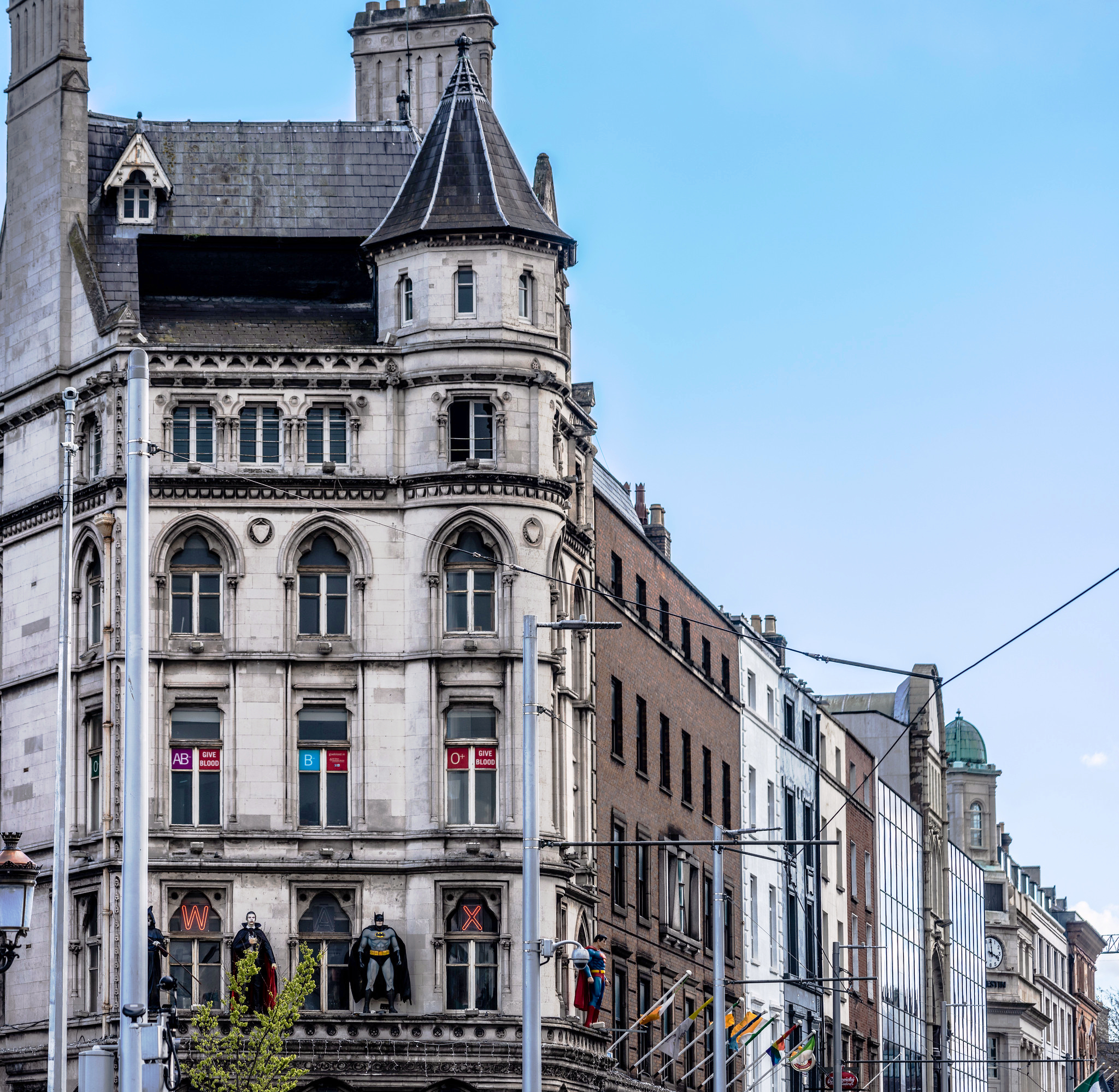
The Lafayette Building

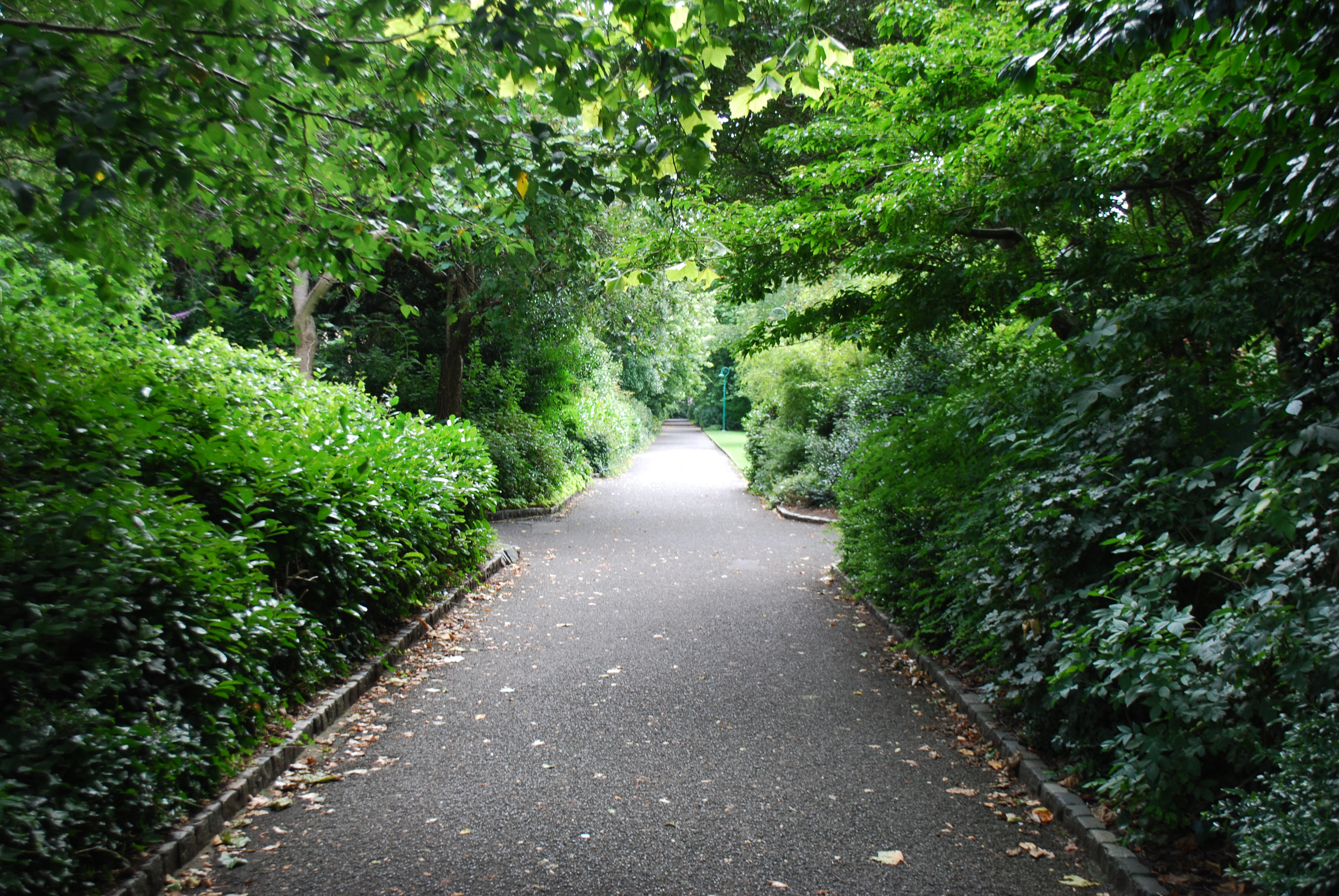
Merrion Square Park, Merrion Square.

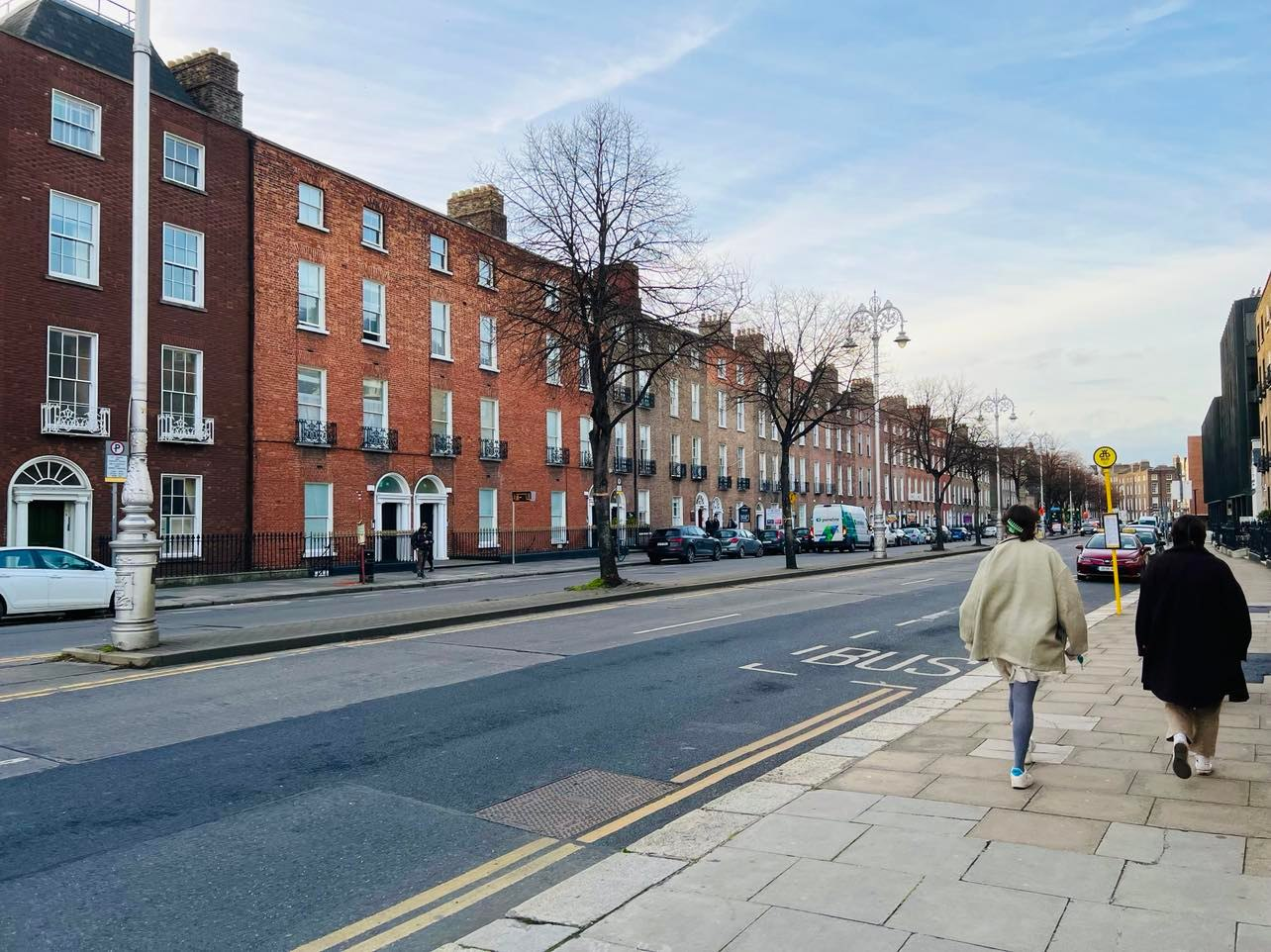
Lower Baggot Street.

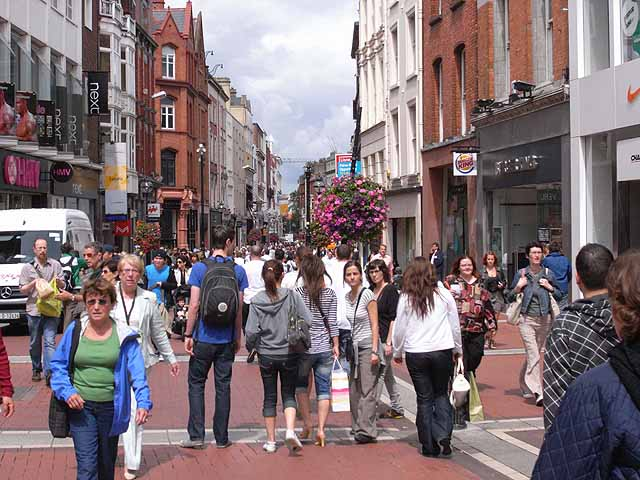
Grafton Street

== See also ==
- List of Dublin postal districts
- List of Eircode routing areas in Ireland
- List of postal codes
