= Fownes Street =

Street in Dublin, Ireland

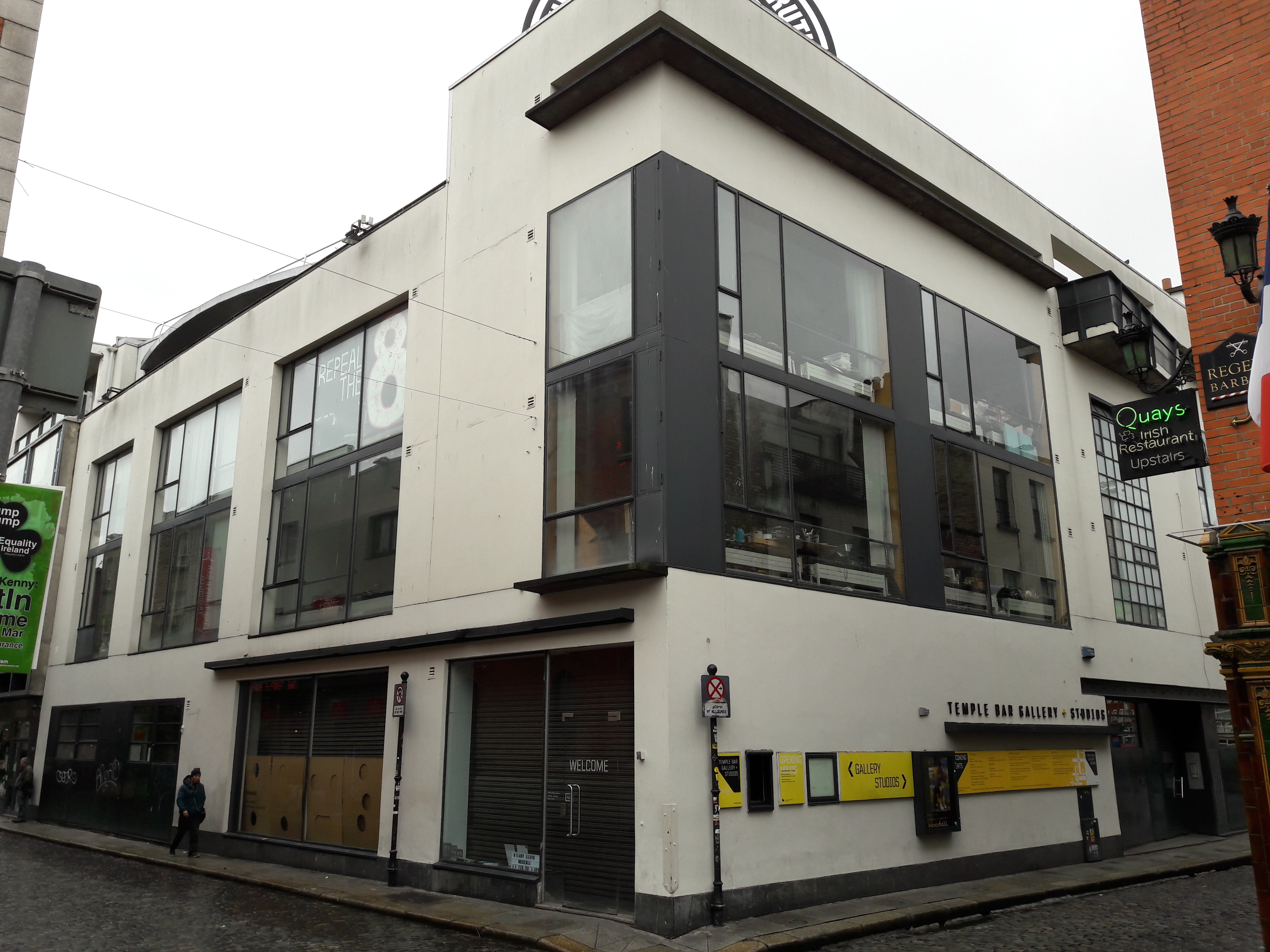
- Temple Bar Gallery and Studios; Fownes Street continues to the right, down to the quays.

- Location within Central Dublin
- Native name: Sráid Fownes (Irish)
- Namesake: Sir William Fownes, 1st Baronet
- Length: 200 m (660 ft)
- Width: 9 metres (30 ft)
- Location: Dublin, Ireland
- Postal code: D02
- Coordinates: 53.345093°N 6.263374°W
- north end: Wellington Quay
- south end: Dame Street

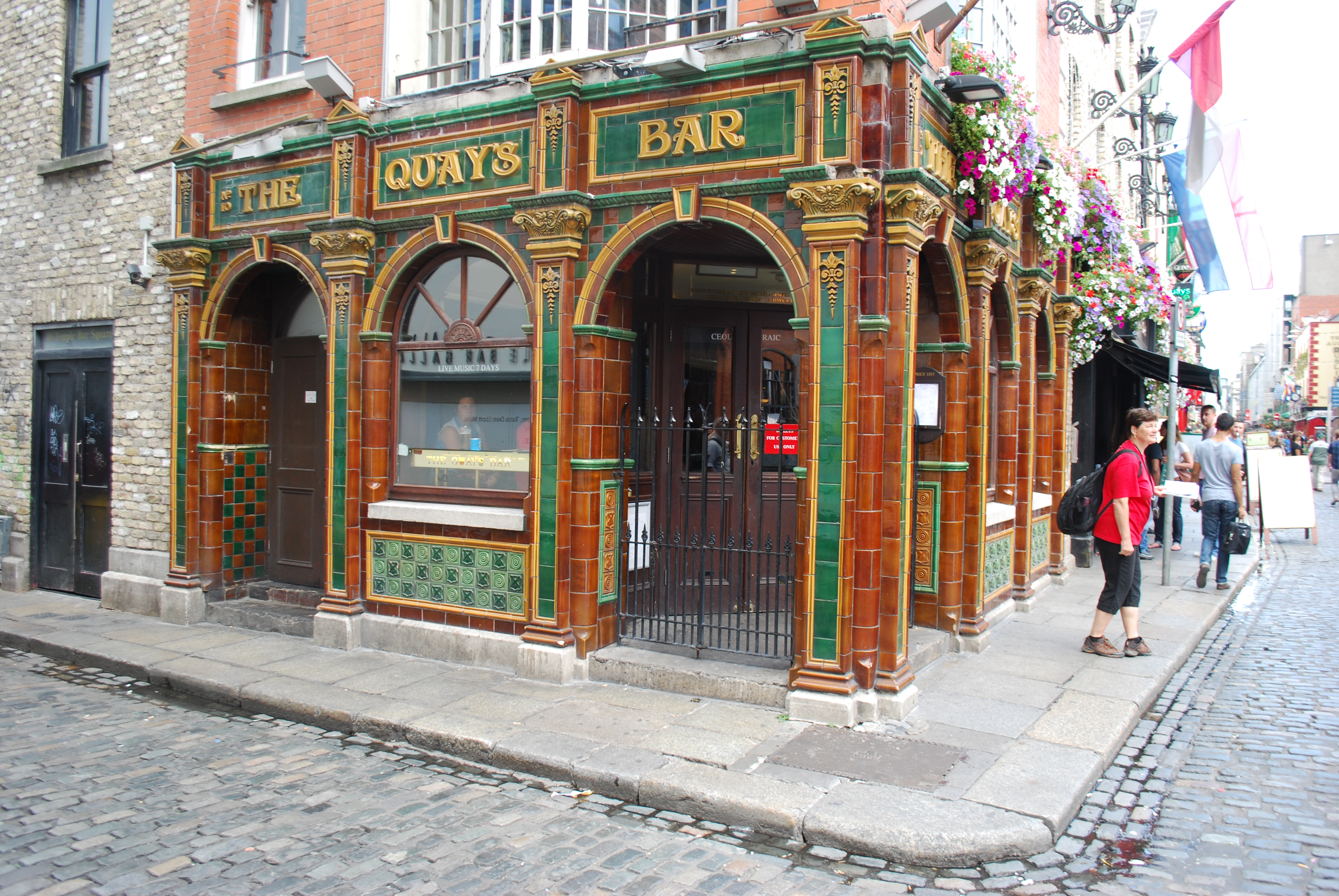
The Quays Bar on the corner with Temple Bar.

Fownes Street /ˈfaʊnz/ is a street in Dublin, Ireland, that runs from Wellington Quay in the north to Dame Street in the south.

== Location ==
The street is crossed by Temple Bar in the north and joined by Cecilia Street on its western side and Cope Street on its eastern side. It is divided into Fownes Street Lower (northern end) and Fownes Street Upper (southern end).

== History ==
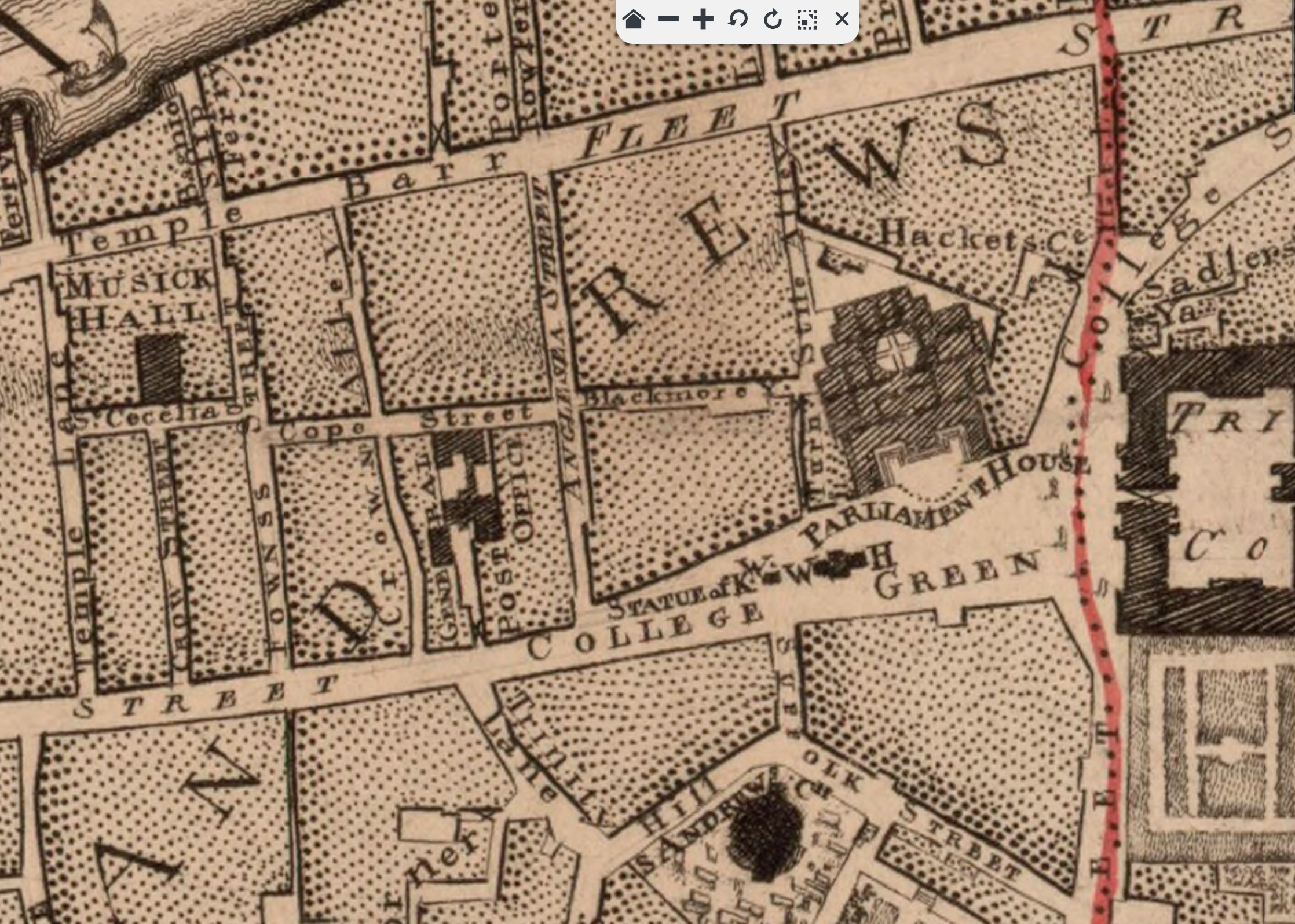
John Rocque's 1756 map of Dublin, Fownes Street at left.

The street was named after Sir William Fownes, 1st Baronet, and first appears on maps in 1708. Fownes owned a medieval mansion in the street's vicinity, Fownes Court, with gardens that ran down to the River Liffey. The lower end of the street was known as Bagnio Slip, after a brothel that stood there.

The Women's Liberation Movement was based in Fownes Street in the 1970s and published from there the Fownes Street Journal (1972). In the 1970s, buildings on the eastern side of the street were demolished with the building of the new Central Bank and plaza.

Fownes Street was also the site of the Hirschfeld Centre, first gay and lesbian community centre in Dublin. Named after the gay rights reformer, Dr Magnus Hirschfeld, the centre opened on St Patrick's Day (17 March) 1979 and was the first venue of its kind in Ireland. It included a café, a small cinema and a disco called ‘Flikkers’, and was credited with the revitalisation of the Temple Bar area as it became the hub for the gay community in the city. A plaque to commemorate the centre was unveiled on 20 June 2019 by the Lord Mayor of Dublin, Cllr Paul McAuliffe, along with Irish LGBT campaigner Senator David Norris, and Eddie McGuinness, Director of the Dublin Pride Festival.

== Cultural references ==
Fownes Street receives a lengthy description in James Joyce's Ulysses (1922, set in 1904).

In Fownes's street Dilly Dedalus, straining her sight upward from Chardenal's first French primer, saw sunshades spanned and wheelspokes spinning in the glare. John Henry Menton, filling the doorway of Commercial Buildings, stared from winebig oyster eyes, holding a fat gold hunter watch not looked at in his fat left hand not feeling it. Where the foreleg of King Billy's horse pawed the air Mrs Breen plucked her hastening husband back from under the hoofs of the outriders.

The references are to Commercial Buildings, a 1799 building on Dame Street, formerly the site of the Dublin Stock Exchange; and to an equestrian statue of King William III on Dame Street, removed in 1929.
