= Clare Street, Dublin =

Street in central Dublin, Ireland

Clare Street
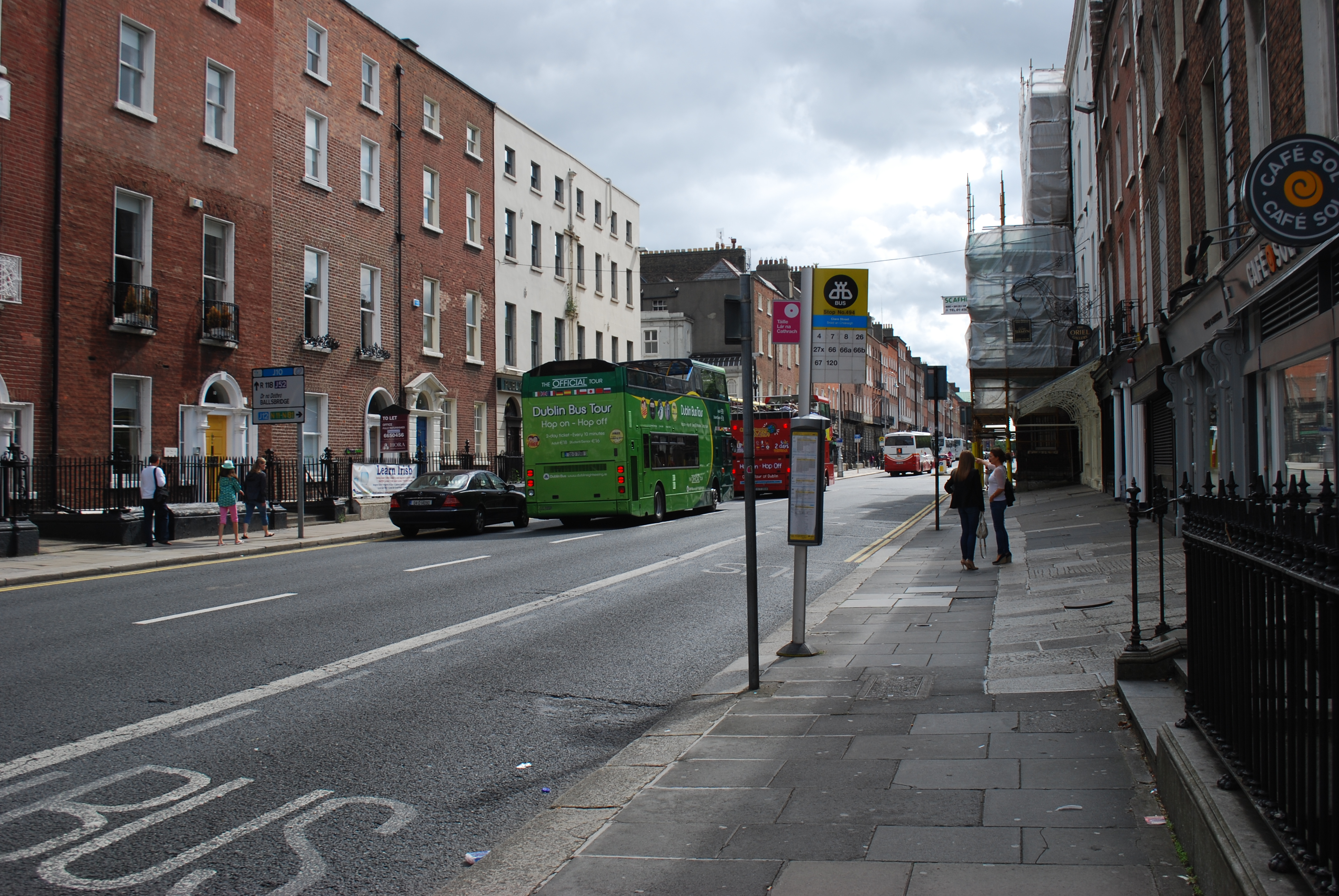
- Clare Street looking east to Merrion Square
- Native name: Sráid an Chláraigh (Irish)
- Namesake: John Holles, 1st Earl of Clare
- Location: Dublin, Ireland
- Postal code: D02
- west end: Leinster Street South
- east end: Merrion Street, Merrion Square

Clare Street (Irish: Sráid an Chláraigh) is a street in central Dublin, Ireland.

== Location ==
Clare Street runs from Leinster Street South in the west to the junction of Merrion Square and Merrion Street in the east.

== History ==
Clare Street first appears on maps as a thoroughfare in 1756. The street was developed by John Ensor around 1762 for the sixth Viscount Fitzwilliam. It was named after John Holles Earl of Clare, or his brother Denzille Holles. His descendants had a number of streets in this area named for them, including Denzille Street (now Fenian Street), Denzille Lane, Holles Street, Wentworth Place, Fitzwilliam Square and Merrion Square.

Samuel Beckett lived on the top floor of number 6 Clare Street, above the offices of his father's firm. While living there he wrote his first novel, More Pricks than Kicks.

One of Dublin's oldest book stops, Greene's, operated from 16 Clare Street from 1843 to 2007. Initially opened as a lending library by John Greene, the Pembrey family ran the business from 1912 until its closure.

== Architecture ==
Much of the original Georgian fabric of the street remains, though with some rebuilding and adaptation. Most of the houses are now in use as offices.

In 1987, listed buildings on the street including the largest surviving townhouse, were controversially demolished in spite their protected status following a period of gutting and sabotage. The houses were finally replaced in 2002 with a new on-street entrance to the National Gallery of Ireland Millennium Wing.

== Notable residents and occupants ==
- Samuel Beckett
- George Sigerson
- The Department of Transport operate from number 25 on the street
