= Robert Dawson (bishop) =

Anglican bishop

Robert Dawson was an Anglican bishop in Ireland in the 17th century. He was born in Kendal, England, in 1589 and was educated at Sedbergh School, Sedbergh. He graduated from St. John's College, Cambridge in 1609 with a Bachelor of Arts (B.A.) and in 1612 with a Master of Arts (M.A.). The Rt. Rev. Robert Dawson was appointed Chaplain to Henry Cary, 1st Viscount Falkland, the Lord Deputy of Ireland in 1622. He became Dean of Dromore on 9 July 1623 and Dean of Down on 25 November 1623. After Roland Lynch died in 1625 the See of Clonfert was united with that of Kilmacduagh and Dawson was its inaugural incumbent, he served from 4 May 1627 until his death on 13 April 1643.

== Family life ==
Dawson had six children: Rowland, Matthew, Randal, Margery, Bridget and Robert. Dawson's brother, Thomas, bought land in County Londonderry in 1633 which became the town of Castledawson, founded in 1710 by Thomas' great-grandson Joshua Dawson MP.

== Death ==
Dawson fled Ireland to his birthplace due to the Irish Rebellion in 1641 and died on 13 April 1643 in Kendal.
