= Cardall =

Irish postcard publisher

Cardall Ltd was an Irish postcard publisher. They were based at 8 Cope Street, Temple Bar, Dublin 2.

The Cardall Collection at the National Library of Ireland contains about 5,000 negatives and some of the corresponding postcards. These images were created in the 1940s, 1950s and 1960s; "Besides conventional views, many of the images are interesting street scenes, and include people and automobiles, advertising signs and shop fronts."
