= Dame Street =

Street in central Dublin, Ireland

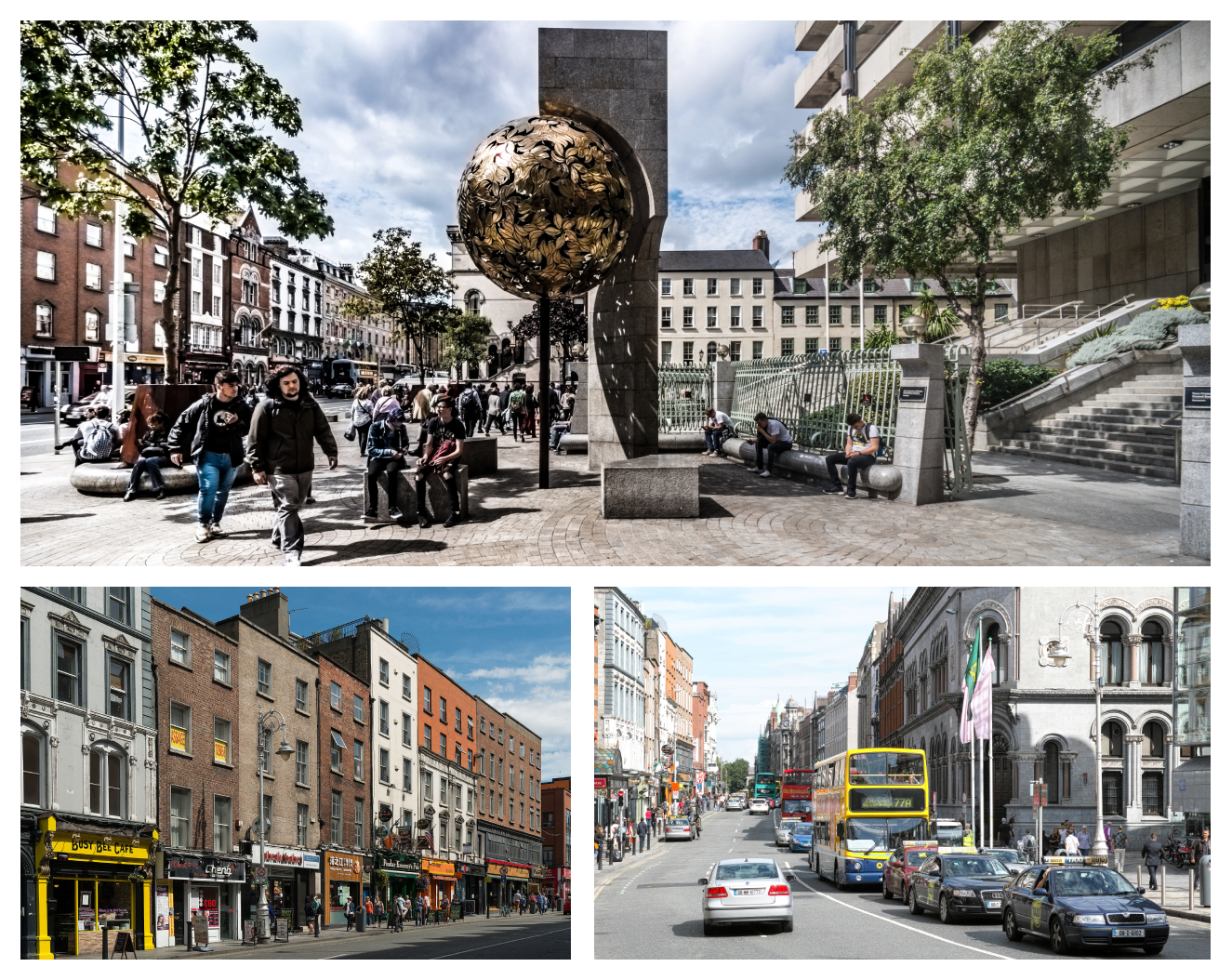
- Dame Street, Dublin

- Location within Central Dublin
- Native name: Sráid an Dáma (Irish)
- Namesake: A medieval dam on the River Poddle
- Length: 300 m (980 ft)
- Width: 20 metres (66 ft)
- Postal code: D02
- Coordinates: 53°20′39″N 6°15′53″W
- west end: Cork Hill, outside City Hall
- east end: College Green

Other
- Known for: banks, restaurants

Dame Street (/ˈdeɪm/; Irish: Sráid an Dáma) is a large thoroughfare in Dublin, Ireland.

== History ==
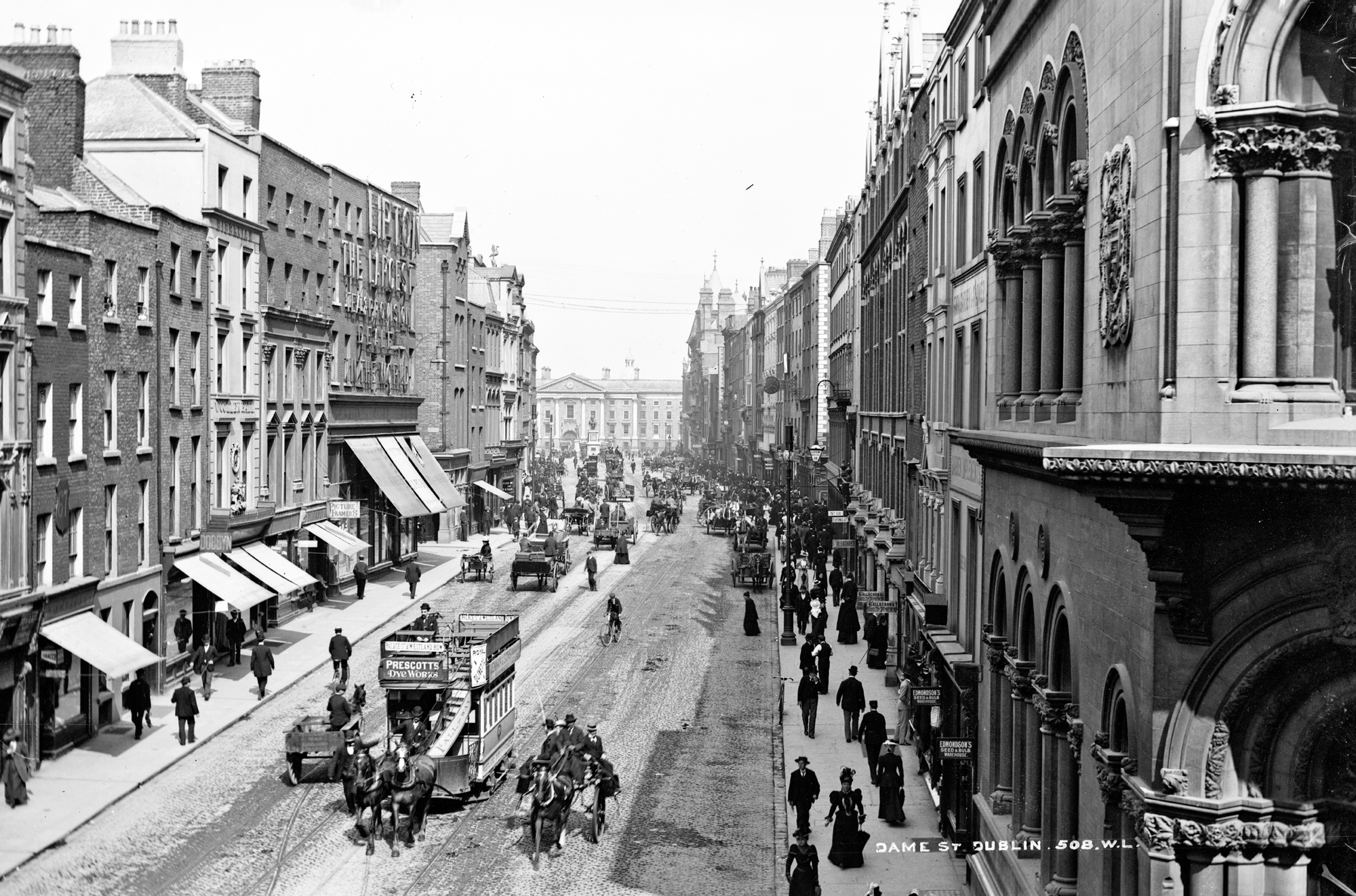
Dame Street in 1898

The street takes its name from a dam built across the River Poddle to provide water power for milling. The street first appears in records under this name around 1610 but in the 14th century was also known as "the street of Theng-mote" or Teyngmouth Street. It appears later as Dammastrete and Damask-street. There was a medieval church of St. Mary del Dam which was demolished in the seventeenth century. Sir Maurice Eustace, Lord Chancellor of Ireland 1660–1665, built his townhouse, Damask, on the site. There was a side street called Dame's-gate, also known as the gate of S. Mary, which was adjoining St. Mary del Dam church, recorded in 1552 and demolished in 1698. The street was widened by the Wide Streets Commission in 1769 and developed into the city's financial centre.

Among the notable residents was Francesco Geminiani, whose house on Dame Street had a concert hall attached. The first recorded meeting of Scouts in Ireland took place at the home of Richard P. Fortune, a Royal Naval Volunteer Reservist, at 3 Dame Street, Dublin on 15 February 1908 where four boys were enrolled in the Wolf Patrol of the 1st Dublin Troop. Unlike O'Connell Street and other previously fashionable streets, Dame Street continued to remain fashionable and prosperous after the Act of Union in 1801.

== Location ==
During the day, the street is busy, due to its central location in the city. It is a five-minute walk to the shopping area of Grafton Street and ten minutes from O'Connell Street. The Temple Bar area of the city is located directly north of the street. Daly's Club was founded in the 1750s at numbers 1-3 Dame Street and remained there until 1791, when it moved to College Green.

== Architecture ==
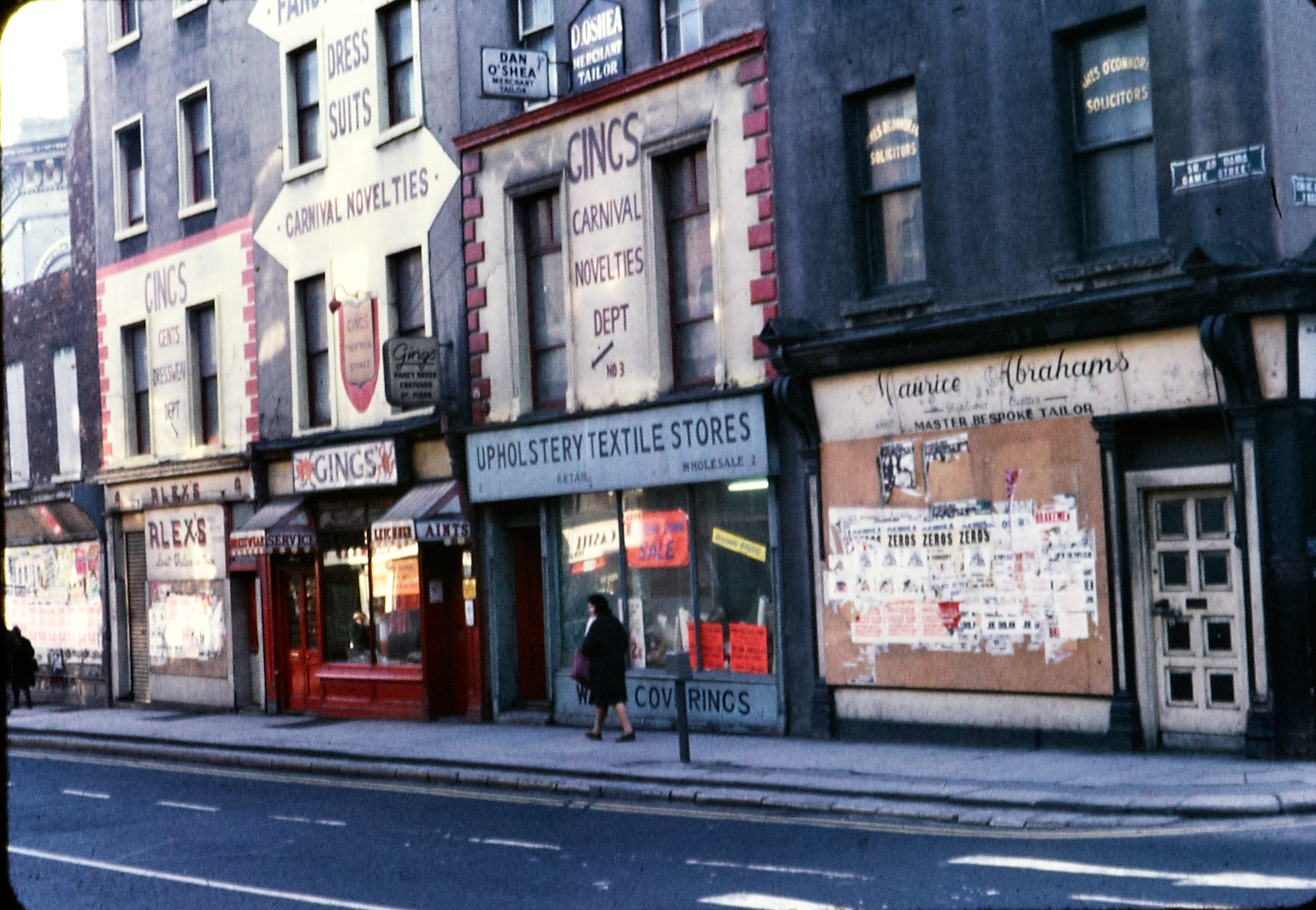
Row of shops which previously occupied Barnardos Square, circa 1973

The former Central Bank of Ireland headquarters, now known as Central Plaza, on Dame Street was built in 1975. It was initially higher than planning permission allowed, though this was retrospectively rectified. The new building was built on a parcel of land on which was a collection of Victorian and Georgian buildings including the Commercial Buildings. The Commercial Buildings dated from 1796, and were associated with the Ouzel Galley Society. This building also featured a paved courtyard which served as a pedestrian shortcut between Merchant's Arch and the Ha'penny Bridge beyond. Initially, planners wanted the facade of the building retained, but it was discarded, and eventually, a replica was constructed in the scheme. Commenting on the scheme in September 1972, Architects' Journal stated that the proposed building was "an exercise in how to do the greatest urban damage". The Bank left the premises in March 2017, and moved to North Wall Quay.

In comparison, Northern Bank, retained the Italianate headquarters of the Hibernian Bank in both the exterior and interior, with redevelopment taking place behind the streetscape. The Allied Irish Banks opposite the Olympia Theatre was designed by Thomas Deane in 1872 for the Munster & Leinster Bank and is based on the design of the Museum Building at Trinity College. The glass and cast iron canopy of the Olympia Theatre which extends out over the footpath is a prominent landmark on the street. The Montague Burton Building is a notable example of the Art Deco style on Dame Street, situated on the corner with South Great George's Street. It was constructed between 1929 and 1930 and designed by architect Harry Wilson. The ground level retail unit of this building is a large Spar shop and delicatessen. Due to its proximity to the gay pub and venue, The George, this Spar became known colloquially as the "Gay Spar". During the 2022 Pride celebrations in Dublin, the Spar officially adopted the name when it "came out" as the Gay Spar.

The street features a modern square, Barnardos Square in front of Dublin Castle and to the side of City Hall. The site had been occupied by a row of shops, one of which was the birthplace of the square's namesake, Thomas John Barnardo. Before its redevelopment, the site had been cleared of the Georgian terrace of buildings which were demolished in the mid-1970s as part of a road-widening development. One of the surviving buildings from the block is the headquarters of the Sick and Indigent Roomkeepers' Society. In the 1980s there was a proposal to create a park on the site.

== Occupy protests ==
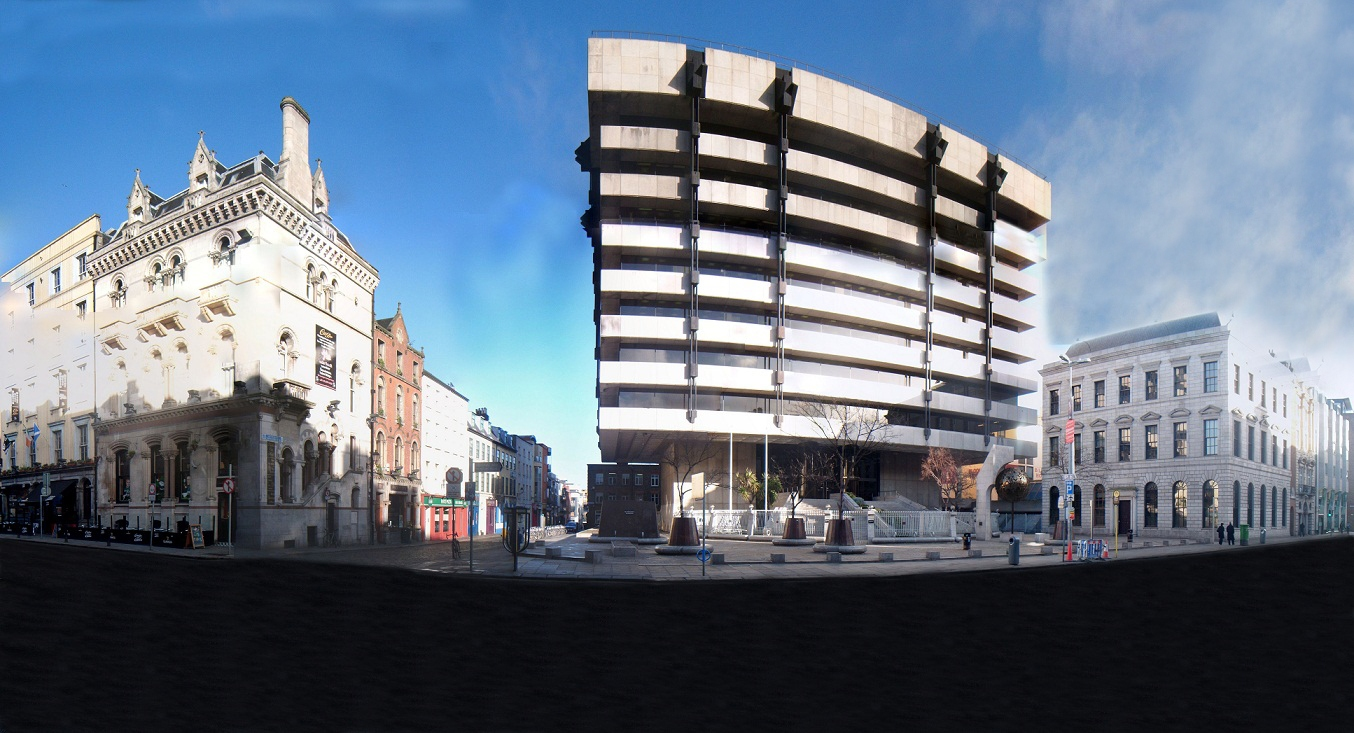
The former Central Bank building, Dame Street

The Occupy Dame Street protest began in October 2011 directly outside the then headquarters of the Central Bank of Ireland, as part of the global Occupy movement, and lasted until March 2012.

== See also ==
- College Green, Dublin
- Occupy Dame Street
- List of streets and squares in Dublin
