= Central Plaza (Dublin) =

Office building in central Dublin, Ireland

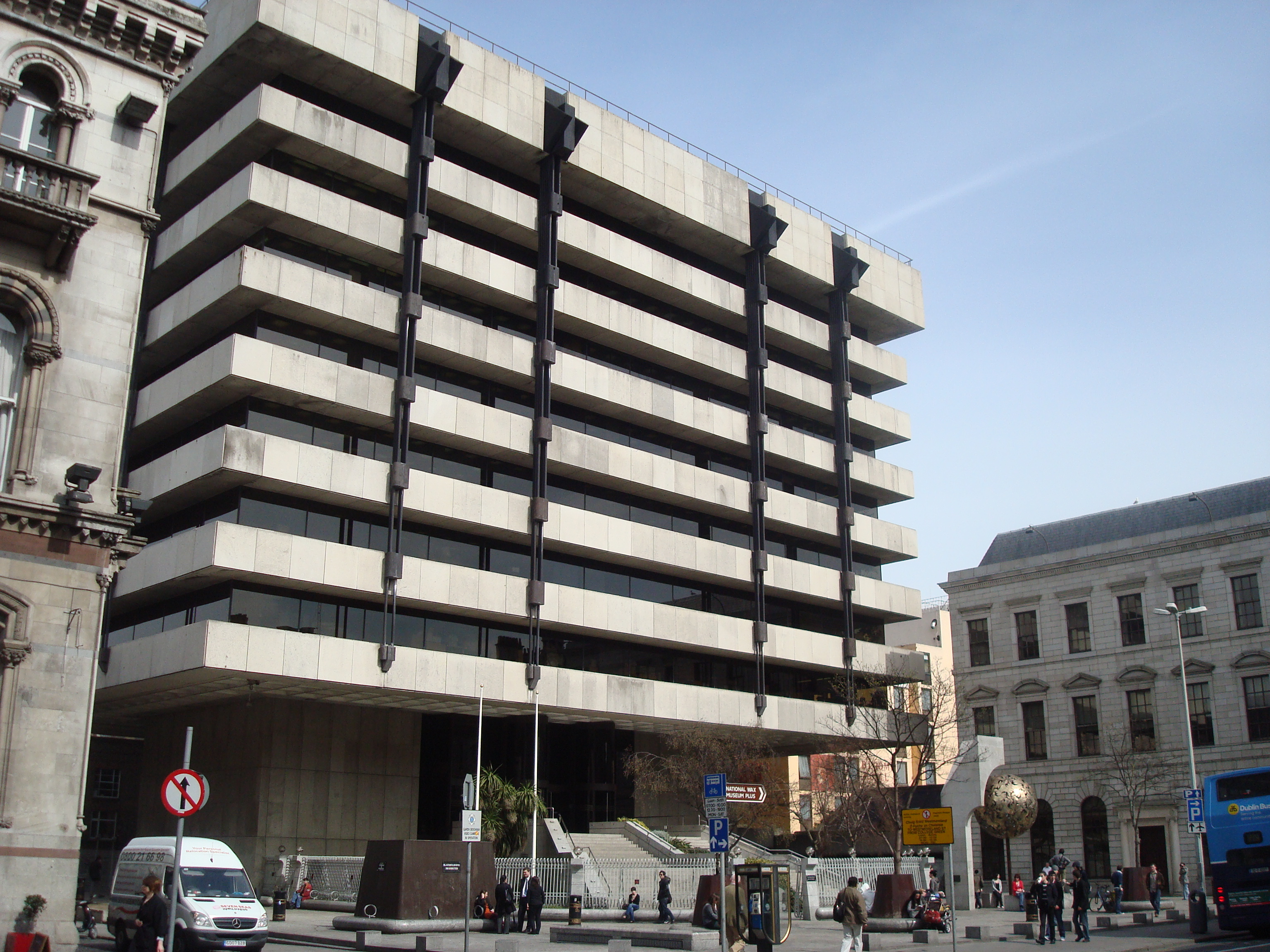
- Interactive map of the Central Plaza area
- Former names: Central Bank of Ireland Building

General information
- Status: Under renovation
- Type: Office building
- Architectural style: Brutalist
- Location: Dublin, Ireland
- Coordinates: 53.3440754°N 6.2629072°W
- Current tenants: WeWork
- Completed: 1978
- Owner: Hines, Peterson Group

Height
- Height: 150 feet (46 m)

Technical details
- Floor count: 8

Design and construction
- Architects: Sam Stephenson (Stephenson Gibney & Associates)
- Main contractor: John Sisk & Co.

Central Plaza, also known as the Central Bank of Ireland Building for its former tenant, is an office building on Dame Street in Temple Bar, Dublin. It was the headquarters of the Central Bank of Ireland from 1979 to 2017.

It is Ireland's only suspended structure building, with its 8 floors hanging from central concrete cores. Each floor was built on the ground and then raised into place. It was controversial for being out of scale with its surroundings and for being constructed 30 feet (9.1 m) taller than approved.

As of 2020, the building was undergoing renovations including the addition of a rooftop venue and observation deck.

== History ==
The Central Bank of Ireland originally proposed a new headquarters on Dame Street in Temple Bar in 1967. The proposal was immediately opposed as it would entail demolition of the site's 18th-century Commercial Buildings constructed in 1799 and which for a period housed the Irish Stock Exchange. Before the Commercial Buildings, the area was historically the site of Fownes Court, a medieval mansion owned by Sir William Fownes, 1st Baronet. It was later the site of the first maternity hospital in Great Britain or Ireland in 1742, but this was later moved to the Rotunda Hospital in 1745. Until 1783, it was also the site of Dublin's General Post Office until this moved to a dedicated building on the other side of College Green.

Approval was given by the Minister for Finance, Charles Haughey, for a 15-storey skyscraper in November 1967 which was later turned down by Dublin Corporation. Permission was granted for a 13-storey, Seagram-style block with the retention of the facade of the Commercial Buildings. This was later revised down from 176 feet high to 120 feet. This design was rejected as too obtrusive by the Minister for Local Government, Kevin Boland. In May 1970, Stephenson submitted a revised scheme, inspired by the work of the Irish-American architect, Kevin Roche. When this scheme was approved, it was with drawings that depicted the roof as flat. Later designs showed a copper clad pitched roof which was 29 feet higher than the approved design. Construction began in April 1973. It was the chief planning officer, Charles Aliaga-Kelly, who noticed the discrepancy in height in August 1973 and began to investigate. A formal request to cease construction was issued by Dublin Corporation on 3 September, but construction continued on site until 23 November.

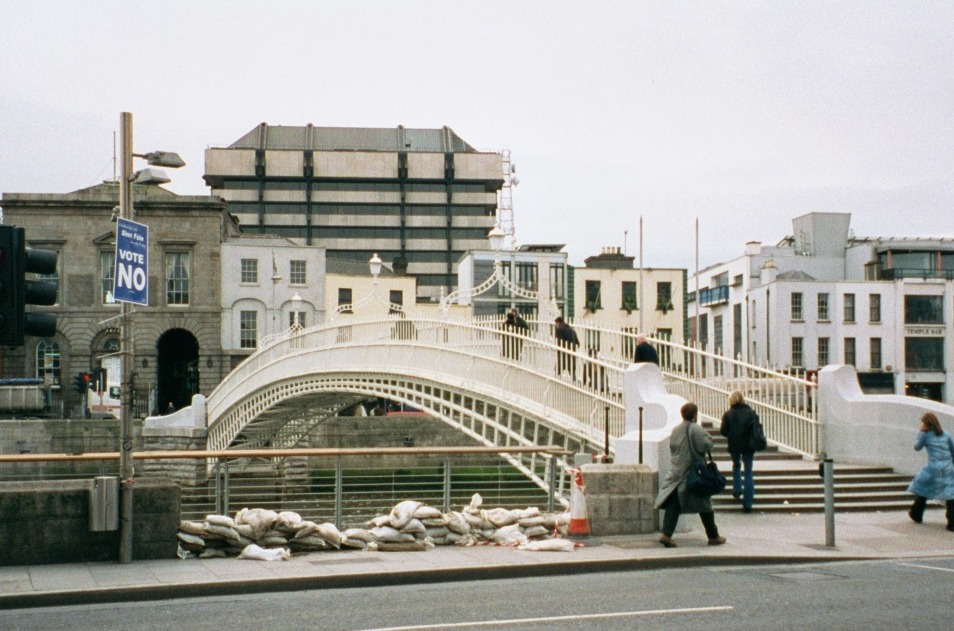
The Central Bank above Temple Bar in 2004, showing the original copper roof

The building was discovered to have reached a height of 150 feet (46 m), exceeding 120 feet approved by Dublin Corporation, and it was suggested that the building would have to be rebuilt using traditional methods, allowing the hangers to be removed. It was the engineering required on the roof from the hanging floors that had increased the height of the block. A public enquiry was opened on 19 February 1974 and lasted 3 days. The greatest concern among the objectors was the dangerous precedent it could set if architects and builders could construct buildings over 25% taller than the approved plans with no recourse. Architect and activist, Duncan Stewart commented that the building would "stand forever as a monument in Dublin to show that you could overpower authority if you had money."

Construction was halted for a year. Rather than reducing the building's height so late in construction, the Central Bank appealed to Minister for Local Government James Tully who approved the height increase. The project, which was carried out by Sisk Group, was completed in 1978, and included a replica of the Commercial Buildings in a different location on the site. This replica used the facade, which was supposed to be retained in situ, but this was abandoned when the adjoining Georgian-style buildings were also acquired. This allowed Stephenson to re-orientate the building to face Fownes Street. The original facade was discarded and a replica constructed in its place. By the time the whole development was finished in 1978, it had cost £10 million, more than five times the initial budget.

The plaza was occupied by the Occupy Dame Street movement in 2011–2012.

=== Departure of Central Bank and renovation ===
The Central Bank announced in 2012 that it would move out of the building, having purchased a site on North Wall Quay in the Dublin Docklands that was originally planned to be the headquarters of Anglo Irish Bank. The Central Bank sold the Dame Street Tower to Hines and Peterson Group for €67 million in 2016 and moved from the tower in 2017.

The tower, its plaza, and public art were proposed to be added to the list of protected structures to protect the significant architecture, but this was deferred by Dublin City Council as it could impede the redevelopment proposed by the new owners. The owners committed that the redevelopment would maintain the building's architectural integrity.

In 2017, renovation plans were announced under the name Central Plaza, including redevelopment of the surrounding plaza, office space, and the addition of a two-story "rooftop venue" and viewing area. The renovation is being conducted by John Paul Construction, who completed a similar renovation at Miesian Plaza, the Bank of Ireland's former headquarters. In 2018, coworking provider WeWork agreed to lease all eight floors of the Central Plaza tower.

As of November 2022, a number of office and retail companies had reportedly taken up tenancies in the "recently opened Central Plaza". As of late 2022, a "date [had] yet to be confirmed" for the opening of the planned rooftop venue.. This was opened to the public in December, 2025.

== Architecture ==
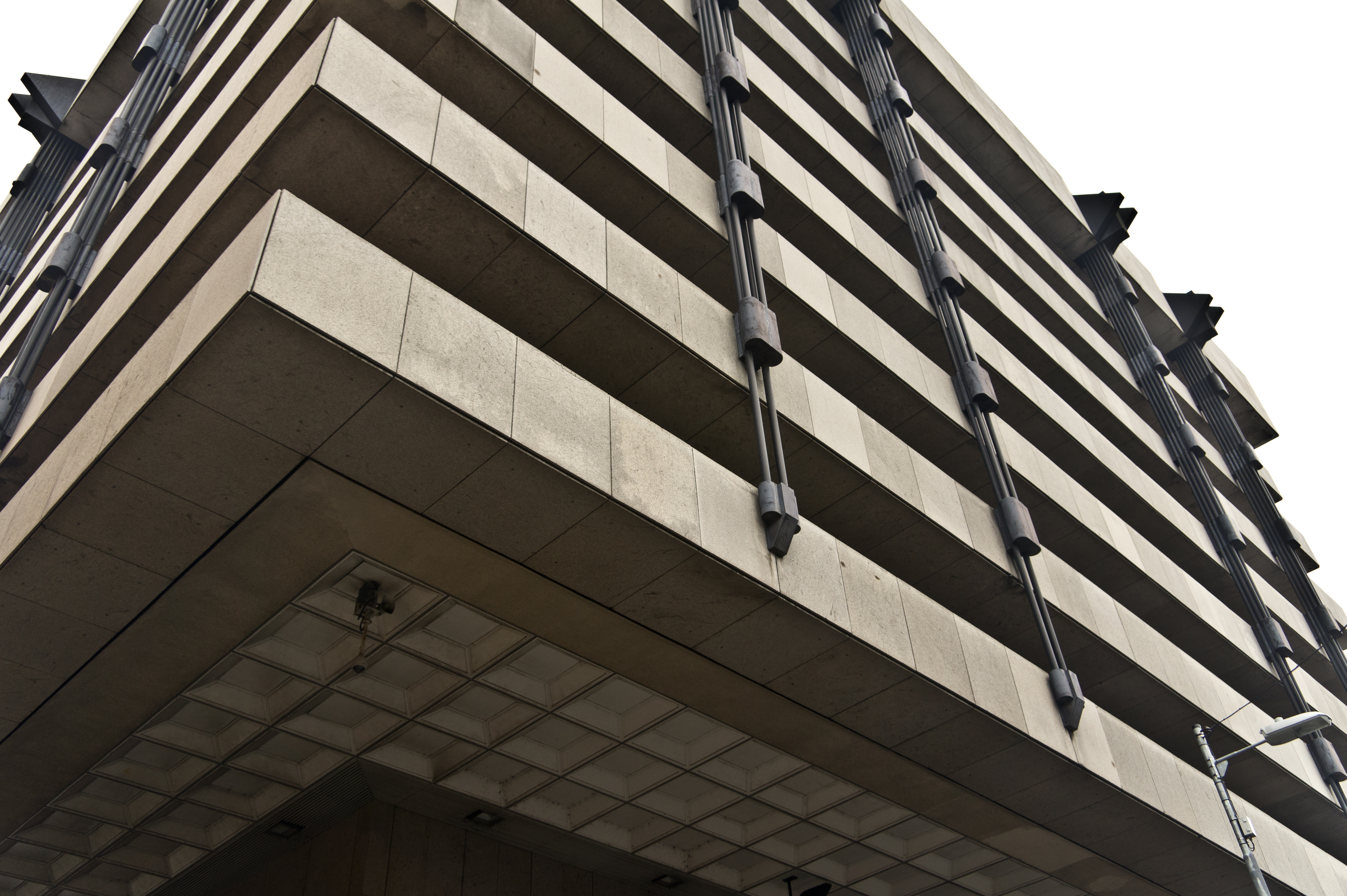
External support detail

The design and construction of the Central Bank building were unique, being the only suspended structure in Ireland, and one of perhaps 20 in the world. The building is based around two central concrete cores, with floorspace suspended around them by twelve sets of external supports. During construction, the concrete cores were built first, and each floor was built at ground level and then raised into place. The rooftop supports were originally exposed on the roof, giving the building an even more distinctive profile, but were later contained in copper cladding due to issues with rainwater.

The building is in the Brutalist style and was criticized when constructed. In 2017, the Irish Times reported retrospectively:

In September 1972 The Irish Times carried an extract from the English magazine Architects Journal, which published a photograph of a model of the proposed bank (which at that time had not been made available in Ireland). The journal described the proposed building as “an exercise in how to do the greatest urban damage with only eight stories”. It berated the “aggressively distinct and monstrously oversized” development which it described as “brutalism gone mad”.

The building has since become better appreciated. In the 2017 application for protected status (which was ultimately unsuccessful), Dublin Councillor Mannix Flynn summarised:

This iconic building and plaza has won the hearts of many Dubliners and deserves its position and place in the record of protected structures. It forms part of the legacy of the late architect Sam Stephenson who also designed the iconic Civic Offices. We have a duty and a responsibility to modern architecture and here is a prime example and a well deserving one at that.

=== Art ===
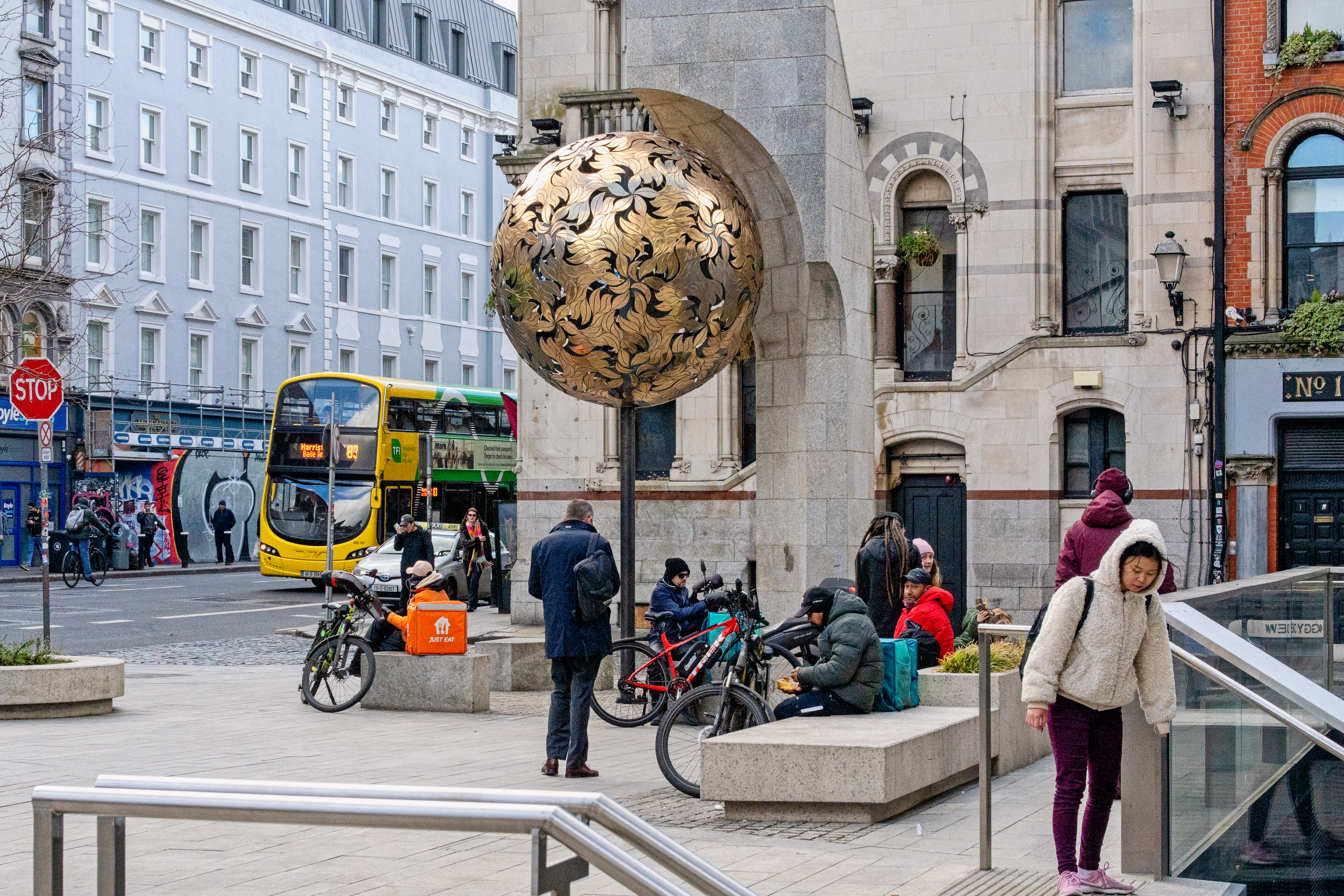
The sculpture Crann an Óir (tree of gold) by Éamonn O'Doherty

The plaza contains the sculpture Crann an Óir (tree of gold) by Derry sculptor Éamonn O'Doherty, which became a symbol of the Central Bank, Irish Banking, and the Celtic Tiger boom and bust.

The Central Bank's lobby contained Abstract Beaded Pattern, a large artwork by Patrick Scott. It was put into storage prior to the Bank's move from the premises in 2017.

== See also ==
- The Qube, a building of similar construction in Vancouver
