= Joshua Dawson =

Irish public servant and land developer (1660–1725)

Joshua Dawson (1660–1725) was an Anglo-Irish public servant, land developer and politician of the Kingdom of Ireland.

In 1697, He was appointed clerk to the Chief Secretary of Ireland, Matthew Prior. In that role he petitioned for the establishment of a Paper & Patent Office. He became the Collector of Dublin in 1703, and held the office of Chief Secretary for Ireland to the Lords Justices from 1710 under Queen Anne. He was a Member of Parliament (MP) in the Irish House of Commons for Wicklow from 1705 to 1714.

From 1705 to 1710 he developed an area of Dublin which included the setting out and later construction of the streets of Dawson Street, Anne Street, Grafton Street and Harry Street. These were named after, respectively, himself, Queen Anne, and Henry Fitzroy, 1st Duke of Grafton (the son of Charles II and cousin of Queen Anne). This development included the construction of the Mansion House in Dawson Street in 1710 which was purchased in 1715 to be the official residence of the Mayor of Dublin.

Dawson resided in County Londonderry and Dublin. Dawson's ancestral family had owned land and lived in the area where he founded Dawson's Bridge in 1710 (named after the bridge over the River Moyola), which was to become present-day Castledawson. In his estate he built Moyola House in 1713.

== Personal life ==
Dawson was born in 1660 at the family seat (modern day Castledawson, County Londonderry). Dawson was the son of Thomas Dawson, Commissary of the Musters of the Army in Ireland. He married Anne Carr, in January 1695/96 and had six children: Mary, William, Charles, Anne Elizabeth, Eleanor, Arthur, Joseph and Arabella. He died on 3 March 1725.

Notable relatives included Henry Richard Dawson, Robert Dawson, Sackville Hamilton, Henry Hamilton (governor) and Henry Hamilton (politician).
