= Wicklow (Parliament of Ireland constituency) =

Pre-1801 Irish constituency

- Former borough constituency for the Irish House of Commons
- County: County Wicklow
- Borough: Wicklow

–1801
- Seats: 2
- Replaced by: Disfranchised

Wicklow was a constituency representing the parliamentary borough of Wicklow in the Irish House of Commons to 1800.

== Members of Parliament ==
- 1613–1615 Sir William Ussher and Sir Laurence Esmonde
- 1634–1635 William Ussher and James Byrne
- 1639–1649 Richard Parsons (died and replaced in 1642 by John Hill. Hill then died and was replaced in 1645 by Joshua Carpenter) and John Hoey
- 1661–1665 Robert Shapcote and Roger Sotheby

=== 1689–1801 ===
Election	First MP		Second MP
1689	Francis Toole		Thomas Byrne
1692	Nathaniel King		Sir Richard Reynell, 2nd Baronet
1695	Nathaniel King		William Robinson
1696	Christopher Carleton		William Robinson
1703	Christopher Carleton		John Price
1704	Sir William Fownes		John Price
1705	Sir William Fownes		Joshua Dawson
1713	Henry Percy		Joshua Dawson
1715	Richard Edwards		Samuel Walter Whitshed
1723	James Whitshed		Samuel Walter Whitshed
1735	Thomas Theaker		Samuel Walter Whitshed
1747	Thomas Theaker		James Whitshed
1751	Edmund Sexton Pery	Patriot	James Whitshed
1761	William Tighe		William Whitshed
1767	Richard William Tighe		William Whitshed
1768	Edward Tighe		William Whitshed
1771	Edward Tighe		John Talbot Dillon
1776	Edward Tighe		Sir William Fownes, 2nd Bt
1777	Hon. Robert Ward		Sir William Fownes, 2nd Bt
1778	Hon. Robert Ward		George Ponsonby
October 1783	John Lloyd		Edward Tighe
1783	Samuel Hayes		Edward Tighe
1790	William Tighe		Edward Tighe
1798	Daniel Gahan		William Henry Armstrong
1800	Henry Grattan	Patriot	William Henry Armstrong
1801	Constituency disenfranchised		
