= Sir William Fownes, 1st Baronet =

Sir William Fownes, 1st Baronet (born before 1672 – 3 April 1735) was an Anglo-Irish politician.

Fownes was the Member of Parliament for the borough of Wicklow in the Irish House of Commons between 1704 and 1713. He was High Sheriff of Wicklow in 1707 and Lord Mayor of Dublin in 1708. On 26 October 1724 he was created a baronet, of Dublin in the Baronetage of Ireland. Upon his death he was succeeded in his title by his son, William Fownes.

Fownes Street in Dublin is named after him.

Parliament of Ireland
Preceded by Christopher Carleton; John Price	Member of Parliament for Wicklow; 1704–1713; With: John Price (1704–1705); Joshua Dawson (1705–1713)	Succeeded by Henry Percy; Joshua Dawson
Civic offices
Preceded by John Pearson	Lord Mayor of Dublin; 1708–1709	Succeeded by Charles Forrest
Baronetage of Ireland
New title	Baronet (of Dublin); 1724–1735	Succeeded by William Fownes
