= Blackpitts =

Area in central Dublin

Blackpitts Na Cuithí Dubha
- Urban area
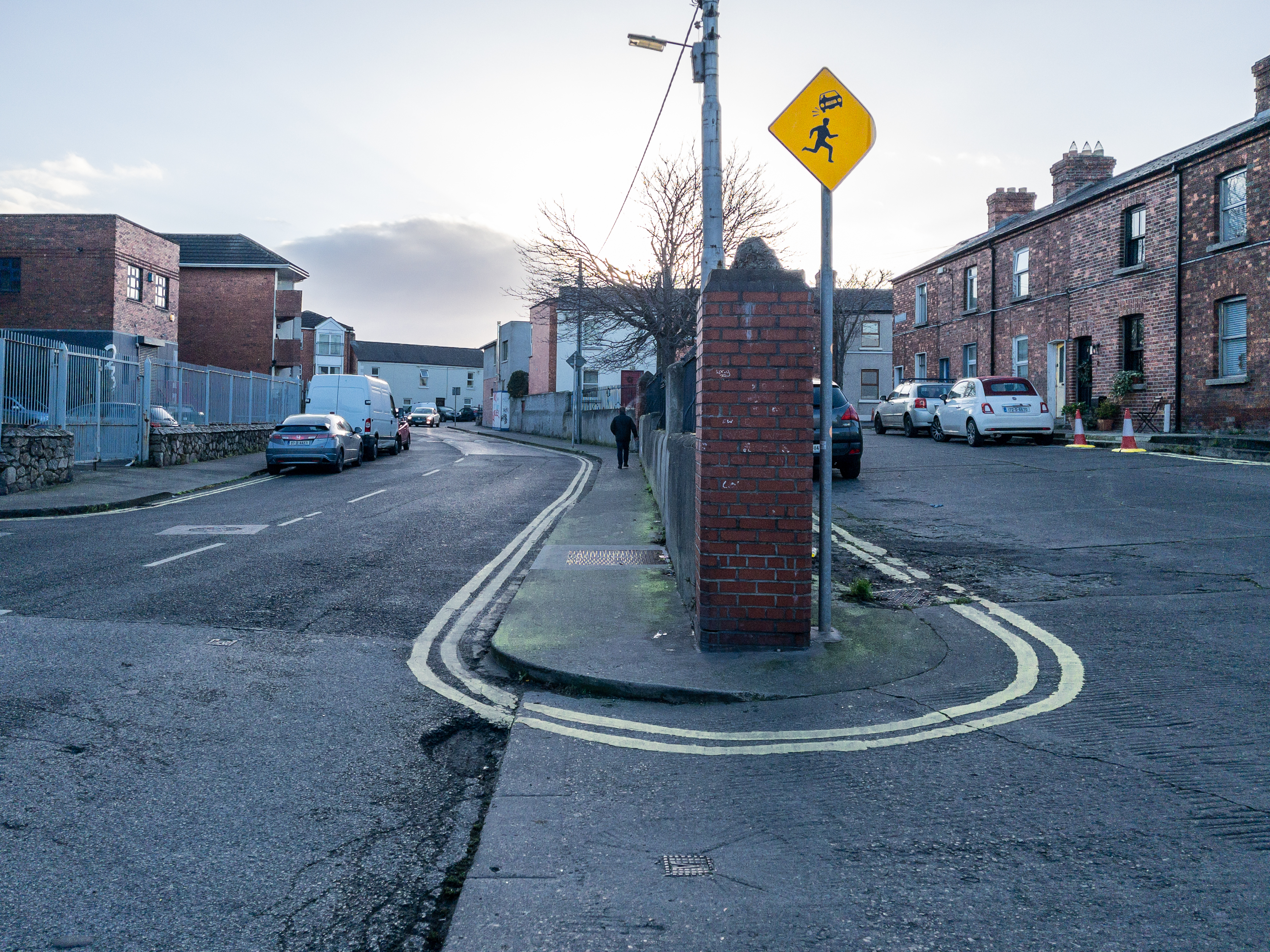
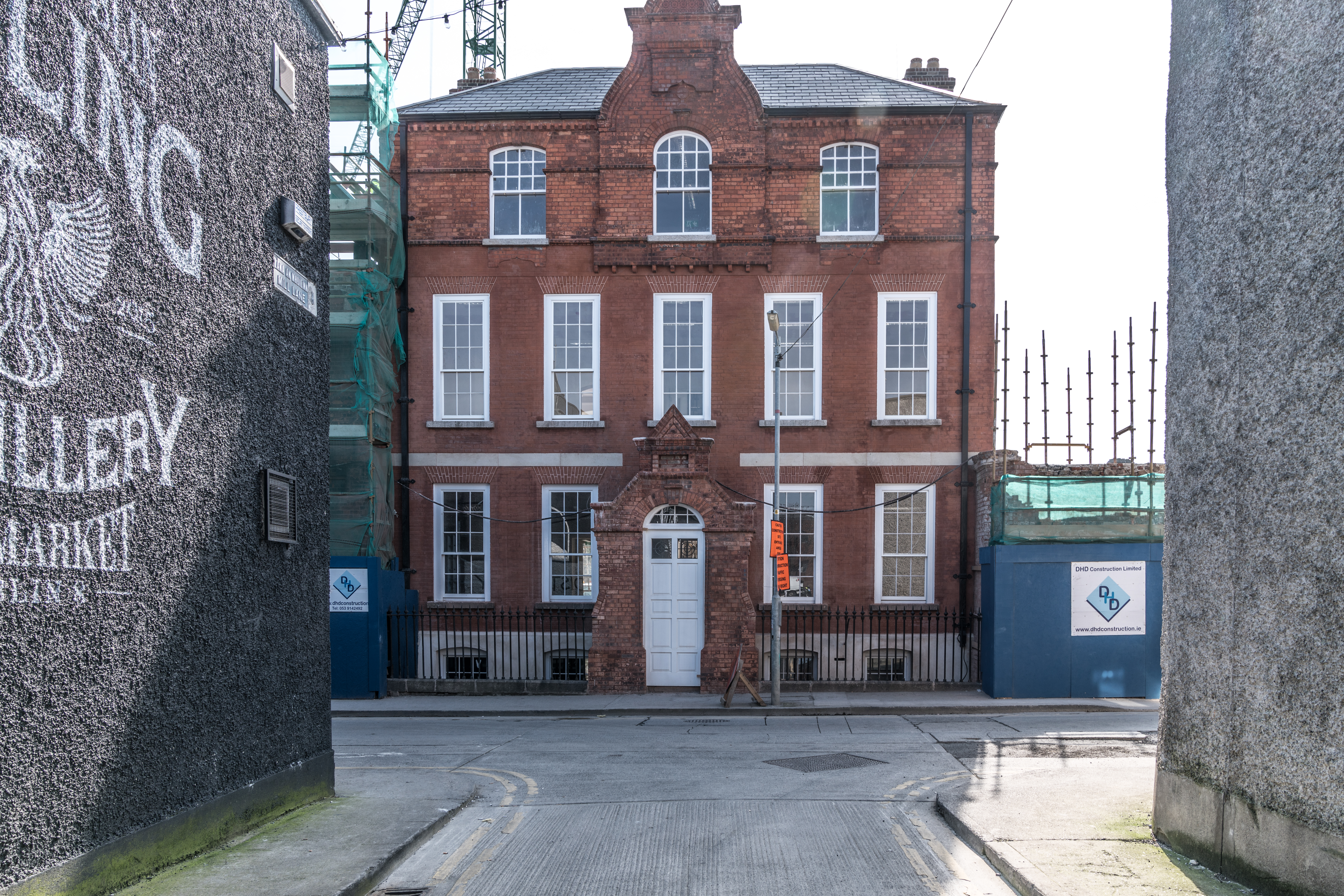
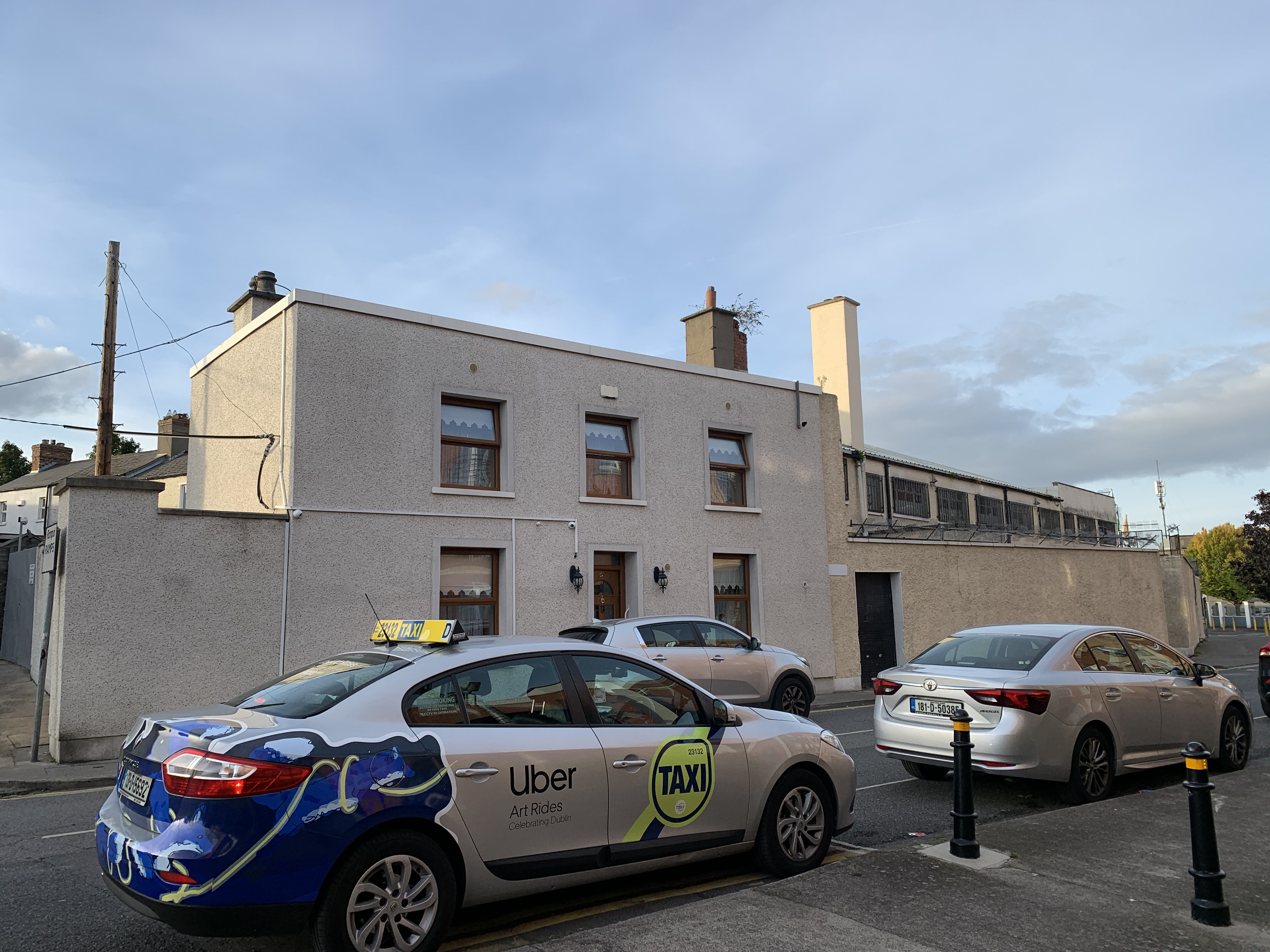
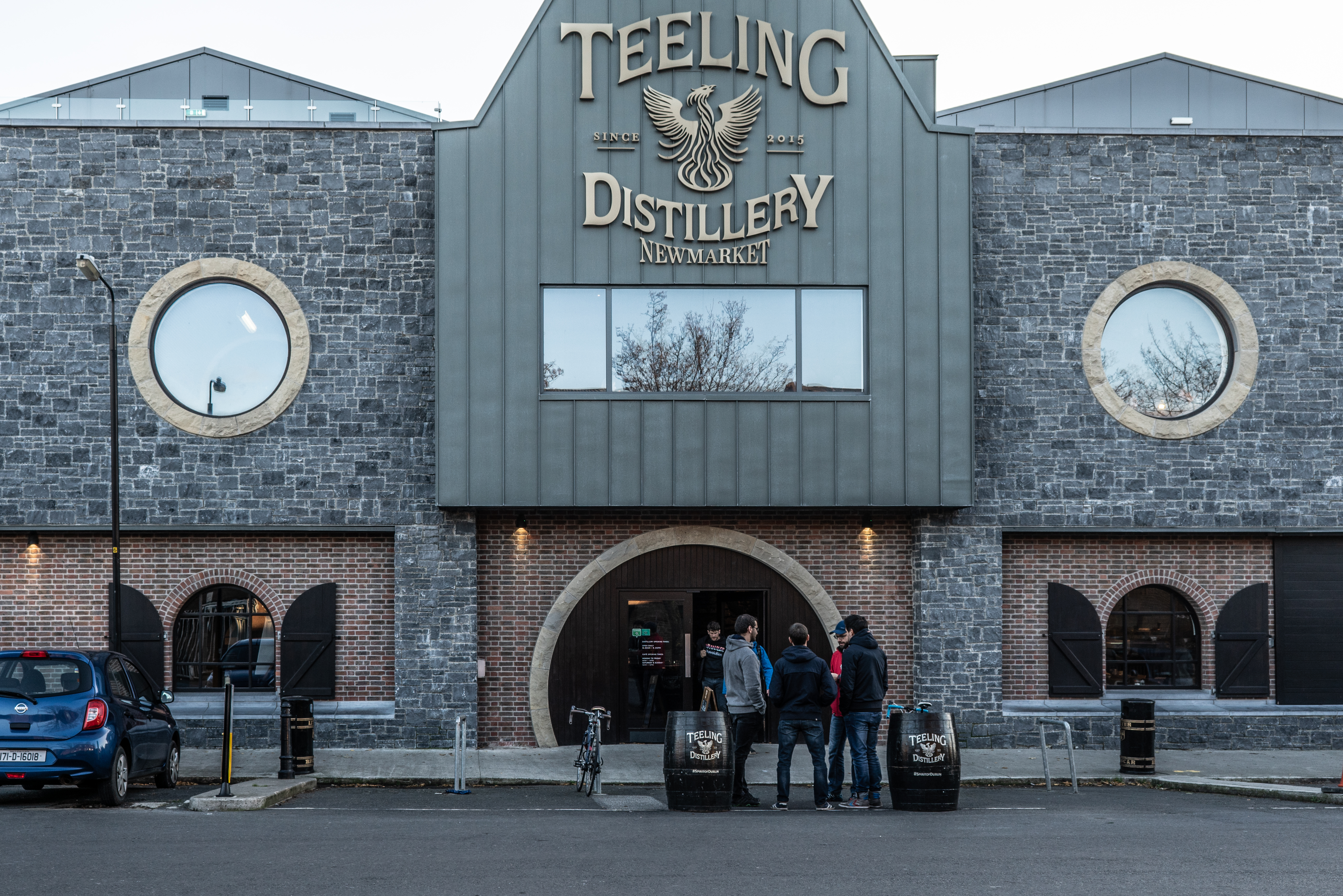
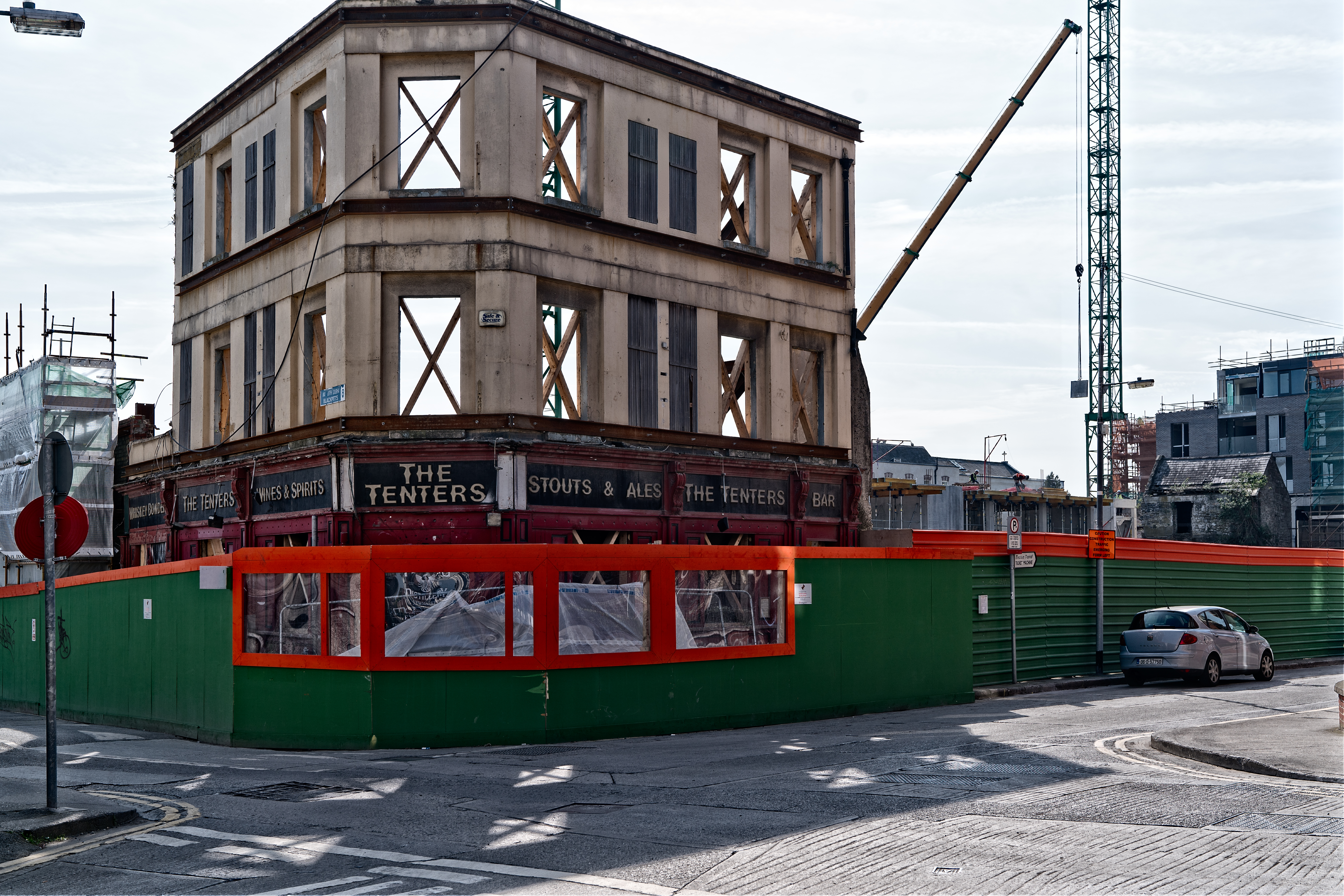
- Fumbally Lane The Mill Street House on 10 Mill Street Blackpitts Mosque The Teeling Distillery The Tenters Pub
- Interactive map of Blackpitts
- Location within Central Dublin
- Coordinates: 53.336°N 6.27515°W
- Country: Ireland
- Province: Leinster
- County: County Dublin
- City: Dublin
- Local authority: Dublin City Council
- LEA: South West Inner City
- Area: The Liberties
- Time zone: UTC+0 (WET)
  - Summer (DST): UTC−1 (IST (WEST))
- Postal code: Dublin 8

Blackpitts, sometimes Black Pitts or The Blackpitts (Irish: Na Cuithí Dubha), is an area of The Liberties in the centre of Dublin, Ireland. It is on the Southside of the city, and is historically associated with the tanning, brewing and distilling industries, and with the River Poddle and its mostly artificial tributaries.

== History ==
The origin of the name "Blackpitts" is debated, and may have derived from the area's tanning history, or mass graves from The Black Death in the area. The area has a long association with the River Poddle and its artificial tributaries, now almost entirely culverted but which long ran in the open and supplied local industry. Fumbally Lane, which connects the Blackpitts area to New Street, was laid out in the early 18th century by Jacob Poole, a brewer with property interests in the area.

Irish street rhymer Michael "Zozimus" J. Moran was born in Faddle Alley between Clanbrassil Street and Blackpitts in 1794.

== Facilities ==
The area has a distillery called the Blackpitts Distillery that dates back to at least 1850, as The Catholic Telegraph records a fire on 19 October 1850 in which one person died. The headquarters for the Irish nonprofit collective Fumbally Exchange are in Argus House, where Raidió Rí-Rá broadcasts from.

The area contains housing, tourist accommodation and warehousing. There is also a Sunni Islam mosque called Blackpitts Mosque owned by businessman Mian Ghulam Bari. The hackerspace TOG's common room is also in Blackpitts. The Mill Street House is on 10 Mill Street, Blackpitts. It was built in the 1720s by the Brazabon family, who were Earls of Meath, and is one of the few "Dutch Billy" style houses that survive today.
