= Mill House =

Traditionally, a Mill House is a working commercial property (mill) which also acts as a residence

Mill House may refer to:

== Buildings ==
=== United Kingdom ===
- Mill House, Adlington, Cheshire, England

=== United States ===
- Mill House (Milford, Delaware)
- Mill House (Wells, Maine)
- Mill House (Lewistown, Montana), listed on the National Register of Historic Places (NRHP) in Fergus County, Montana
- Gomez Mill House, Newburgh, New York
- Mill House (Middleburg, Virginia)
- Mill House (Dayton, Washington), listed on the NRHP in Columbia County, Washington

=== Other places ===
- Mill Street House, Blackpitts, Dublin

== Other uses ==
- Mill House (horse), a racehorse
- Mill House Stable

== See also ==
- Millhouse (disambiguation)
