= Islam in the Republic of Ireland =

Islam in Europe by percentage of country population 95–100%: Azerbaijan; 90–95%: Turkey; Kosovo; 50–70%: Albania; Bosnia and Herzegovina; Kazakhstan; 30–35%: North Macedonia; 10–20%: France; Sweden; Georgia; Montenegro; 5–10%: Austria; Belgium; Bulgaria; Denmark; Germany; Liechtenstein; Luxembourg; Netherlands; Russia; Switzerland; United Kingdom; Spain; Greece; 4–5%: Serbia; 2–4%: Italy; Finland; Norway; Malta; Slovenia; Cyprus (Note: Only takes into account the Muslim population residing on land controlled by the Republic of Cyprus.); 1–2%: Croatia; Ireland; Ukraine; Andorra; < 1%: Iceland; Armenia; Belarus; Czech Republic; Estonia; Hungary; Latvia; Lithuania; Moldova; Monaco; Poland; Portugal; Romania; San Marino; Slovakia

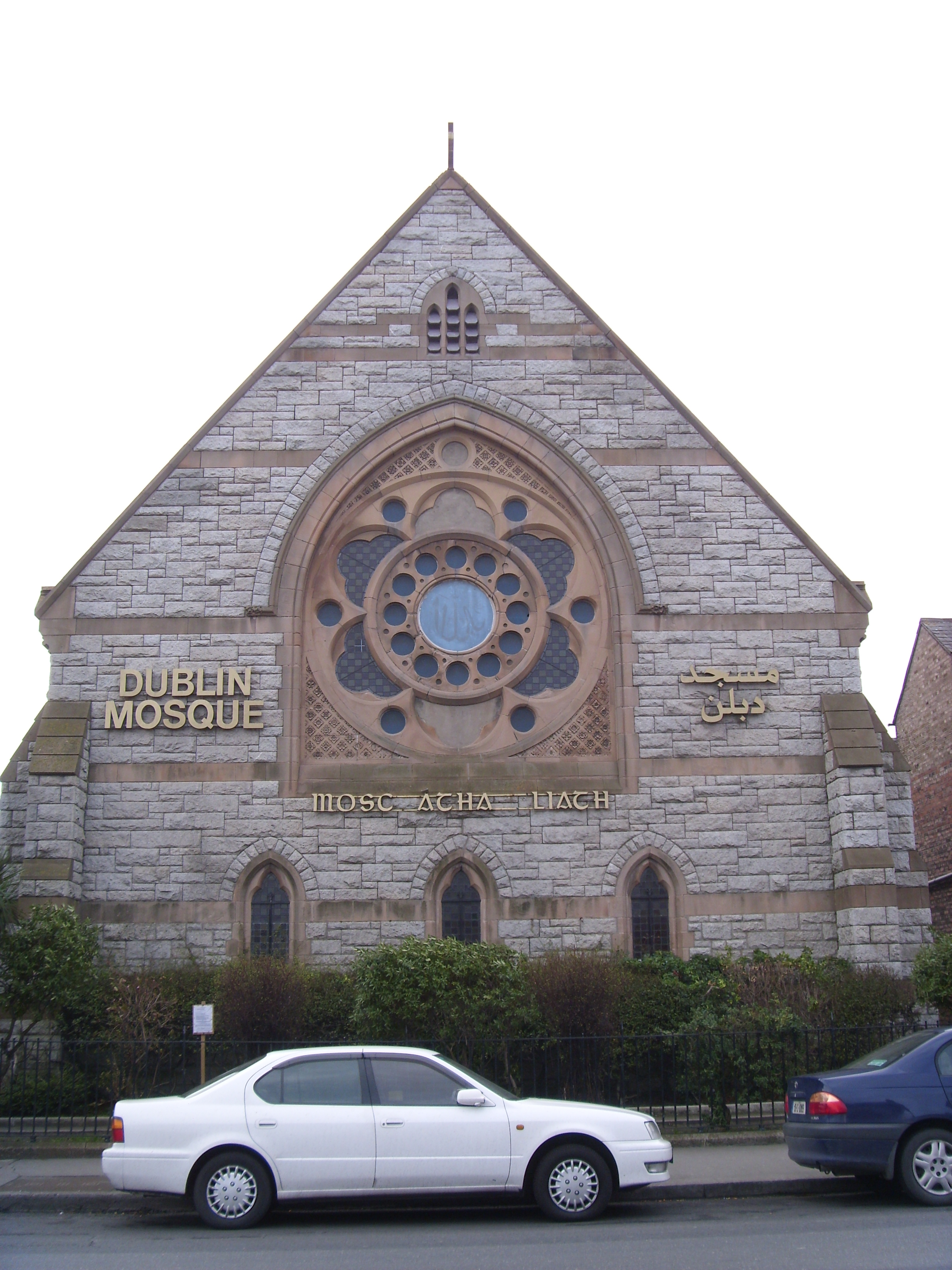
Dublin Mosque

The documented history of Islam in the Republic of Ireland dates back to the 1950s. The number of Muslims in Ireland has increased since the 1990s, mostly through immigration. For the 2022 Irish census, 81,930 were counted within the Republic of Ireland. There are around 12,000 Muslims within Northern Ireland.

== History ==
The earliest mention of Ireland in Muslim sources originates in the works of Al-Idrisi in his Tabula Rogeriana mentioned Irlandah-al-Kabirah (Great Ireland).

The organisational history of Islam in Ireland is complex, not least because of the great variety of ethnic backgrounds of Muslims in the country. The first Islamic Society in Ireland was established in 1959, formed by students studying in Ireland and was called the Dublin Islamic Society (later called the Islamic Foundation of Ireland). At that time there was no mosque in Dublin, so the students used their homes and later rented halls for Jumu'ah (Friday) and Eid (Muslim holiday) prayers. In 1976 the first mosque and Islamic centre in Ireland was opened in a four-storey building at 7 Harrington Street, Dublin 8.Among those who contributed to the cost of the mosque and Islamic centre was the late King Faisal of Saudi Arabia. In 1981, the Ministry of Endowment and Islamic Affairs of Kuwait sponsored a full-time imam for the mosque.

The Belfast Islamic Centre was founded in Belfast in 1978. The Centre is currently located on the corner of University Road and Fountainville Avenue in South Belfast.

In 1983, the present building of the Dublin Mosque and Islamic Centre was bought, renovated and the headquarters of the Society moved from Harrington Street to 163 South Circular Road, Dublin 8.

In Cork, prayer halls are located in housing estates. Cork's Muslim community operates out of an industrial estate, while hoping to raise money to build a new mosque.

In 1992, Moosajee Bhamjee became the first (and to date only) Muslim Teachta Dála (Member of Irish Parliament).

== Demography and ethnic background ==
Historical population
Year	Pop.	±%
1991	3,873	—
2002	19,147	+394.4%
2011	48,130	+151.4%
2016	63,443	+31.8%
2022	81,930	+29.1%
2002 census: 2011, 2016 censuses: 2022 census:

According to the 2022 census, there were 83,300 Muslims living within the Republic of Ireland, representing a 29.1% increase over the figures for the 2016 census, remaining very much a minority. Cities and towns with the highest Muslim population according to the 2022 census are:

1. Dublin and suburbs: 37,458
2. Cork and suburbs: 4,535
3. Limerick and suburbs: 3,394
4. Galway and suburbs: 2,367
5. Waterford and suburbs: 2,084
6. Balbriggan: 1,133
7. Dundalk: 996
8. Tralee: 980
9. Drogheda: 915
10. Portlaoise: 810
11. Ennis: 711
12. Sligo: 628
13. Athlone: 615
14. Navan: 592
15. Carlow: 564
16. Kilkenny: 562
17. Swords: 550
18. Ballyhaunis: 543
19. Cavan: 520
20. Mullingar: 497
21. Letterkenny: 489
22. Killarney: 467
23. Naas: 422
24. Longford: 402.

The Muslim community in Ireland (including Northern Ireland) is diverse and growing rapidly, and its numbers are not determined by the country's history to the same extent as Great Britain and France, where the majority of Muslims are immigrants or descendants of immigrants from former colonies, or Germany and Austria, where the majority of Muslims are Turkish migrant workers and their descendants. Within the Republic of Ireland, just over 55 per cent of Muslims were either Asian or African nationals with 30.7 per cent having Irish nationality. The census also revealed that of the 31,779 Muslims resident in the Republic of Ireland at the time of the census, 9,761 were Irish nationals, less than the number of Asians (10,649) although more than the 6,909 African nationals. The census of 2011 found there were 49,204 Muslims in the Republic of Ireland, "a sharp rise on five years previously". The Muslim immigration at the end of the 1990s was caused by the Irish economic boom and asylum seekers from diverse Muslim countries, and in the 20-year period between 1991 and 2011 the Muslim population increased 1000%, from 0.1% to 1.1% of the population of the republic.

=== Age and sex ===
There was an increase in the number of Muslims in every five year age group between 2006 and 2016. There were 147 Muslim males for every 100 females in 2006. This gap narrowed to 129 males per 100 females in 2016. The average age of Muslims in 2016 was 26.0 (compared with the State average of 37.4 years). There were 10,884 children of primary school-going age (5-12 year olds) among the Muslim community in the Republic of Ireland and a further 5,480 of secondary school age.

=== Marital status ===
Muslims in the Republic of Ireland are more likely to be married and were less likely to be single compared with the general population. Almost 6 out of 10 were married compared with 4.8 out of 10 for the general population. Divorce is also less prevalent among Muslims compared with the general population.

=== Residence ===
Just under half (47.3%) of all of the Republic of Ireland's Muslims lived in County Dublin. Dublin City was home to the largest proportion (15.5%), followed by South Dublin (13.1%), Fingal (12.8%) and Dún Laoghaire-Rathdown (5.9%).

=== Principal economic status ===
The economic status of Muslim men and women varied greatly with relatively small numbers of women at work and slightly above average numbers of men looking after the home and family.

Among Muslim men, 53.3 per cent were at work in April 2016 with 17.0 per cent unemployed or looking for their first job. In contrast, 23.6 per cent of Muslim women were working at the time of the census while a further 1 in 5 (19.5%) were unemployed.

In all, 27.4 per cent of Muslim women aged 15 and over were looking after the home or family – significantly higher than the rate for all women at 14.9 per cent.

=== Major occupational groups ===
There were 17,543 Muslims at work in the Republic of Ireland. At a broad occupational level, "professional occupations" was the largest category, accounting for 23.5 per cent of workers. Within this category medical practitioners were the largest occupation, with 2,102 workers and accounting for 12.0 per cent of all Muslim workers compared followed by chefs (1,349).

== Mosques and denominations in Ireland ==
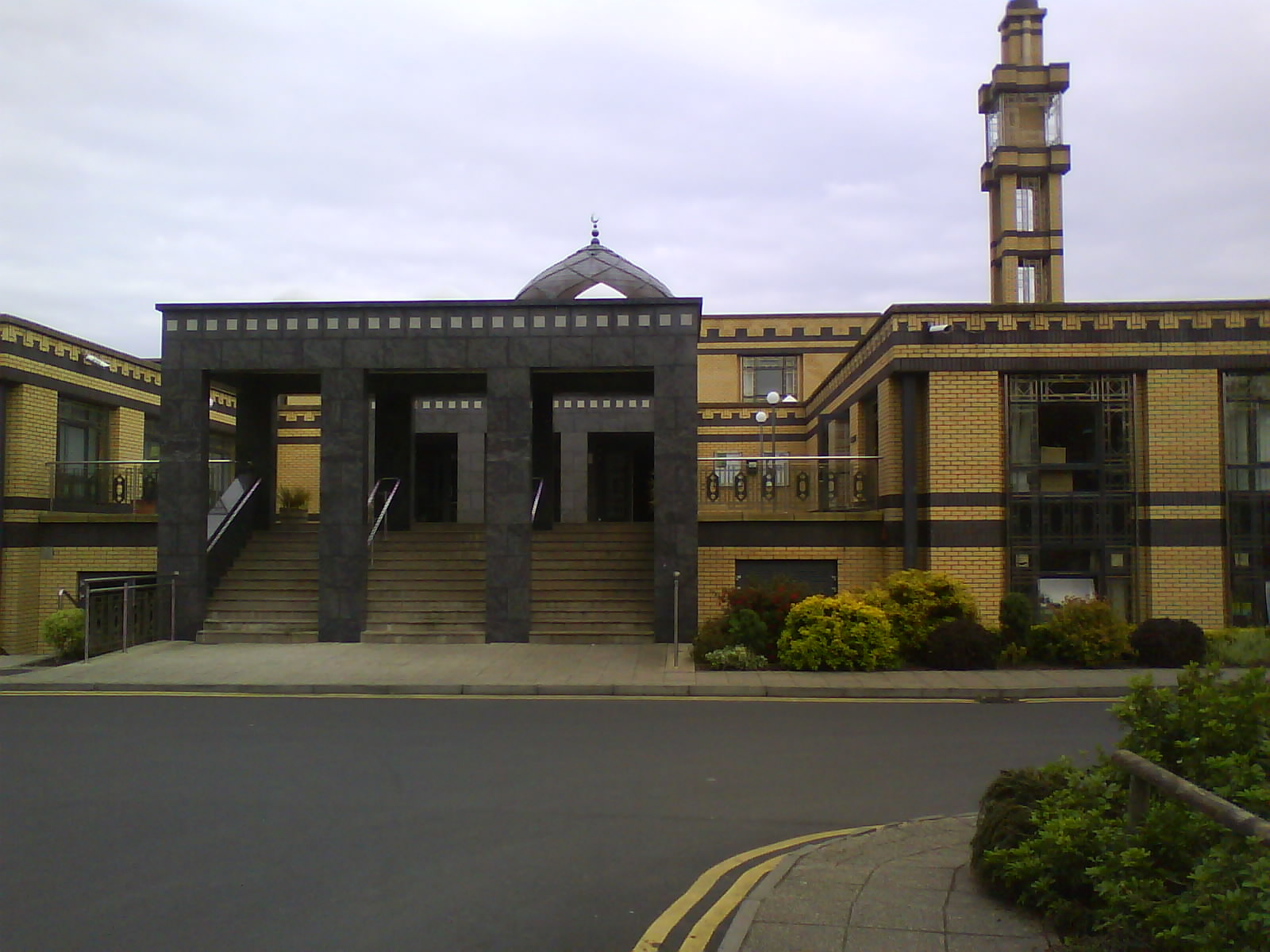
The Islamic Cultural Centre of Ireland (ICCI)

In 2003, the Islamic Cultural Centre, with help from Foras na Gaeilge, announced plans to translate the Quran from Arabic into Irish for the first time. The planners found it hard to find speakers of both languages and as of 2018 no translation exists.

In September 2006, an umbrella organisation, the Irish Council of Imams, was established. It represents 14 imams in Ireland, of both the Sunni and Shia traditions. It is chaired by Imam Hussein Halawa (Islamic Cultural Centre of Ireland) and its deputy chairman is Imam Yahya Al-Hussein (Islamic Foundation of Ireland). Imam Dr. Umar Al-Qadri (Al-Mustafa Islamic Cultural Centre Dublin 15), Imam Salem (Cork Mosque), Imam Khaled (Galway Mosque) and Imam Ismael Khotwal (Blackpitts Mosque) are among its founding members.

=== Sunni ===
- the Islamic Cultural Centre of Ireland (ICCI) in Clonskeagh, Dublin. Imam: Hussein Halawa
- the Dublin Mosque (run by the Islamic Foundation of Ireland) on the South Circular Road. Imam: Yayha Al Hussein
- Al-Mustafa Islamic Cultural Centre Ireland, or Blanchardstown Mosque, Dublin 15. Imam: Dr. Umar Al-Qadri
- Muslim Association Forum, Ireland, situated at the Islamic Foundation of Ireland in Dublin and established since 1999, and acquired Charity status in 2001, as a melting pot for Muslims from African background to teach and share Islamic knowledge.
- Blackpitts Mosque in the Blackpitts in Dublin.
- Muslim Association of Ireland, executive director: Dr. Khaled Suliman
- Belfast Islamic Centre, founded in 1978 and located on the corner of University Road and Fountainville Avenue in South Belfast.
- North West Islamic Centre, located in the Pennyburn Industrial Estate in Derry. It is run by the North West Islamic Association (NWIA).
- Turkish Irish Educational and Cultural Society Fethullah Gulen in Dublin, established in 2004
- Bray Mosque, 25 Florence Road, off Main Street, Bray, County Wicklow
- Dundalk Muslim Community Centre, Glenmore Park, Muirhevnamor, Dundalk, County Louth. Imam: Nooh Buye
- Dundalk Islamic Culture Centre, 12 Eimear Court, Market Square, Dundalk, County Louth. Imam: Abdulrahman Alhaddad
- Ballyhaunis Mosque, Ballyhaunis, County Mayo, was built in 1987, making it the first purpose-built mosque in Ireland. It is a small mosque, which accommodates about one hundred and fifty worshipers. It was built by a Muslim businessman called Sher Rafique who used to own a Halal meat factory there.
- Sligo Mosque; Abbeyquarter North, Sligo
- Galway Mosque; Galway Islamic Centre, 13 Sandyview Drive, Riverside, Galway
- Portlaoise Mosque; Ashley House, Dublin Road, Portlaoise, County Laois
- Islamic Cultural Centre Killarney; Old post office, Beech Road Car Park, Beech Road, Killarney, County Kerry
- Islamic Cultural Centre Kerry; Fort Field, Killierisk, Tralee, County Kerry, V92 CC79.

=== Prayer Halls ===
- Al-Madinah Prayer Hall, 8 Talbot Street, Dublin 1
- Royal College of Surgeons, Dublin 2
- Trinity College Dublin, Dublin 2
- Dublin City University, Dublin 9
- University College Dublin, Belfield, Dublin 4
- Islamic Information Centre – Camden Street, Dublin 2
- Blackpitts Mosque, 25-26 Blackpitts (Off South Circular Rd), Dublin 8
- Blanchardstown Masjid, Gumatti, Unit 6, Coolport Business Park, Coolmine Industrial Estate, Blanchardstown, D15, Dublin
- Dawah Community Centre, Castleknock Cross, Old Nava Road, Beechpark Ave., Castleknock, Dublin 15, Dublin
- Jumma Prayer is held every week in St. Colmcille's GFC sports club in Swords, County Dublin at 1.30pm
- Portlaoise ICCI Mosque, Dublin Road, Portlaoise, Co.Laois

=== Shia ===
- Ahlul Bayt Islamic Centre (Shi'a Muslim), in Milltown, Dublin. Imam: Dr. Ali al-Saleh
- Babul-Ilm Society Ireland (Azakhana e Zahra), in Unit 28, Stadium Business Park, Ballycoolin, Dublin 15
- Ahlul Bayt Islamic Centre, Cork, Unit 4 Wilton West Link Park, Wilton, Cork, T12 XY02

=== Ahmadiyya ===
The Ahmadiyya Muslim Community was formally registered in the country in 1992, during the era of the Mirza Tahir Ahmad. Ahmadi Muslims have been in the country since the 1960s. There are two Ahmadiyya mosques in Ireland, one in Galway City, named the Galway Mosque, and one in Lucan, Dublin. The Galway Mosque is purpose built. Most Ahmadi Muslims in Ireland are refugees from countries where they are persecuted.

== Media ==
Some UK-based television channels targeted at the Muslim Community can be accessed in the Republic of Ireland via satellite, including the Sky digital platform.

== Notable Muslims ==
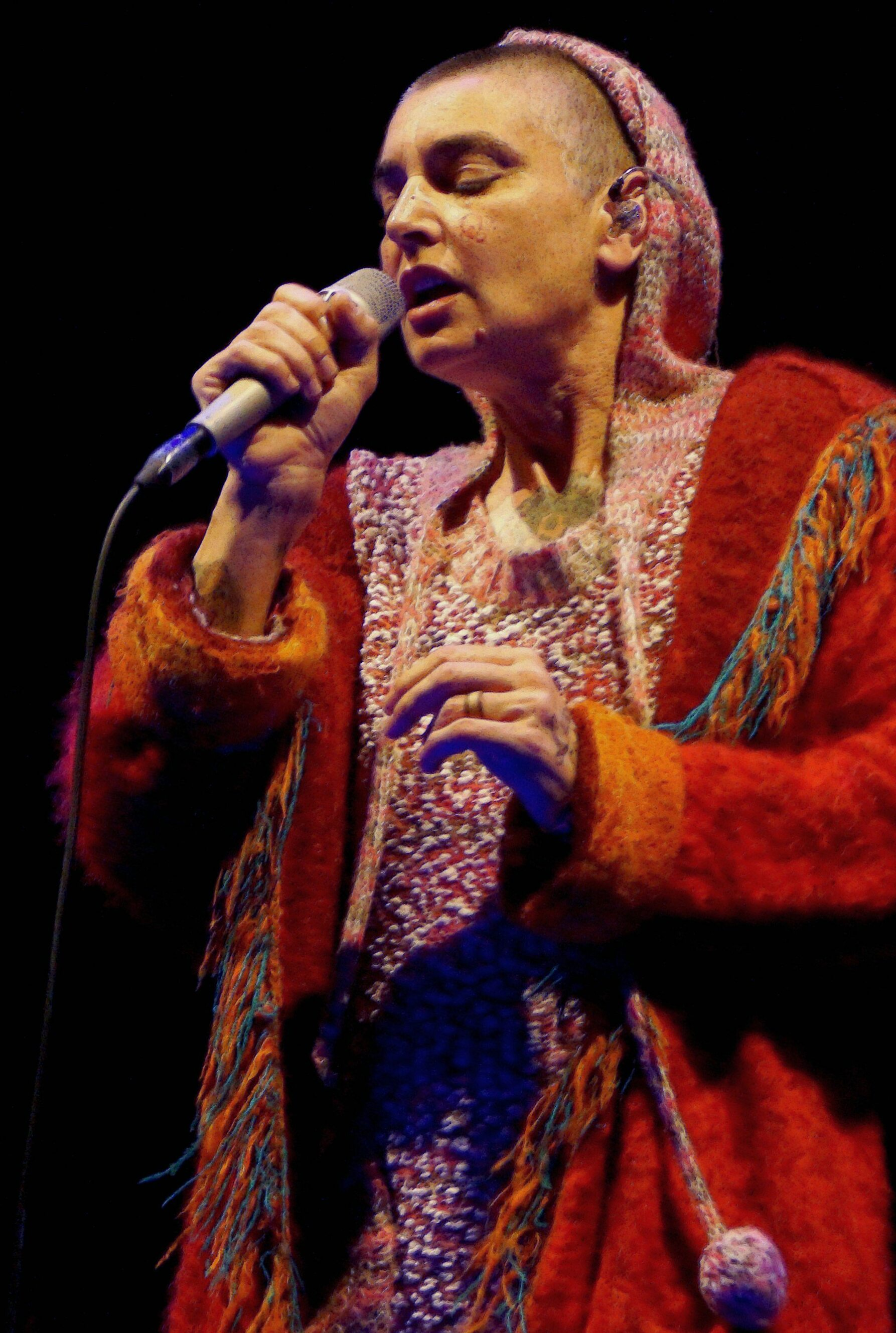
Irish singer and songwriter Sinéad O'Connor

- Rowland Allanson-Winn – Irish peer, writer, and prominent leader of the Woking Muslim Mission; 5th Baron Headley
- Moosajee Bhamjee, first Muslim TD
- Jono Carroll, Irish professional boxer converted to Islam
- Rex Ingram, film director, converted to Islam in 1933
- Sinéad O'Connor, Irish traditional and pop singer who announced her conversion to Islam in October 2018

== Muslim students in universities ==
There are several student Islamic societies in universities and other third-level institutions all across Ireland, especially in the following institutions: UCD; TCD; The Queen's University of Belfast (Queen's or QUB); UCC; Ulster University; University of Galway; ISSNI; RCSI; GMIT; ITC; DCU; Dublin Institute of Technology (DIT); IT Tralee; IT Tallaght; IT Blanchardstown; and the DBS.

Yearly events include regular (weekly halaqas & linguistic classes), social (Food festivals), cultural (Eid), Charity drives (Charity week), physical (sports), Academic (speakers tours, lectures, courses, conferences & seminars), Intellectual (debates) and campaigns (Islam awareness & justice).

The Federation of Students Islamic Societies Ireland is an umbrella organisation established in the early millennium (2003) whose mission is to unite, serve and represent Muslim students. It also seeks to bring these students together, to share experiences and to offer help and advice where appropriate, uniting Muslim Students to positively contribute to Irish communities.

== See also ==
- Islam in Northern Ireland
- Muslim Sisters of Éire
- Religion in the Republic of Ireland
