= Al-Mustafa Islamic Cultural Centre Ireland =

Islamic community center in Dublin, Ireland

The Al-Mustafa Islamic Cultural Centre Ireland, which started its activities as Clonee Mosque, based in the village of Clonee, is the mainstream and leading Islamic Centre in Dublin 15, Ireland. It was established in January 2004 as Clonee Mosque, to act as a place of worship for the Muslim community in Clonee and surrounding areas of Dublin 15.

In 2007, due to the high number of attendees attending Friday prayers, Clonee Mosque relocated to an industrial unit in Damastown. The Islamic Center represents more traditional Sufi-oriented Barelvi movement.

== Rename and inauguration in 2008 ==
In January 2008, Clonee Mosque was renamed to "Al-Mustafa Islamic Cultural Centre Ireland", and was inaugurated by the then Minister for Justice Brian Lenihan. Al-Mustafa ICC was represented in the Irish Council of Imams by its founder and Imam, Shaykh Umar Al-Qadri.

Al-Mustafa ICC has approximately 500 members.

== Aims and objectives ==
The aims and objectives of Al-Mustafa Islamic Cultural Centre are:

1. To provide the Muslim Community in Ireland a religious and spiritual platform to improve their religion and spirituality
2. Promote peace, harmony, integration and tolerance
3. Promote friendly relations between Muslims and non Muslims
4. Provide high quality authentic traditional education to children and youth
5. Provide various other services to the Muslim community: Information centre about Islam, Friday prayer, Daily 5 prayers, Fatwa (Islamic Verdicts), Nikah Hajj and Umrah services, Islamic Shariah Courses, Interfaith dialogue and Halal certification of meat and non-meat products.

== Activities ==
There are various educational, cultural and spiritual activities organized by Al-Mustafa ICC.

There are 120 students studying in Al-Mustafa weekend Quran School. In the weekend Quran school students are taught the following subjects: Quran recitation, Memorization of the Quran, Fiqh, Seerah, uloom Al-Quran, uloom Al-Hadith and Islamic history. There are 6 teachers teaching in Al-Mustafa weekend Quran school.

Sisters Halaqah takes place every Sunday.

Jummah Salah (Friday prayer) starts at 1:30 pm with the lecture. The lecture is completely in English and followed by a short Arabic Khutbah and the prayer is held at 2:10 pm

Every Thursday night a halaqah takes place of Zikr.

Al-Mustafa ICC organizes many spiritual events throughout the year (Eid ul-Fitr, Eid ul Adha, Lailat-ul-Qadr, Laylat-al-Mubarakah, Shab Meraaj and Milad-un-Nabi

The first Mawlid-un-Nabi Procession in Ireland was organized by Al-Mustafa ICC. Leaders of other faith were invited and spoke on the 'Prophet of Peace Conference' which followed after the Milad-un-Nabi procession the Islamic Cultural Center.

== Stand against Extremism ==
"AMICC" has taken a stand against extremism and terrorism. The Members of Al-Mustafa Islamic Cultural Center Ireland have extended their deepest sympathy and condolences to the families of the victims and the people of France on the savage and dreadful terrorist attack on the offices of Charlie Hebdo in Paris yesterday. The Al-Mustafa Islamic Centre Ireland has published a set of guidelines on how to approach cartoons which depict the image of the Islamic prophet Muhammad.

== See also ==
- List of Islamic educational institutions
