= Islamic Cultural Centre of Ireland =

Islamic centre in Dublin, Ireland

- Ionad Cultúrtha Ioslamach na hÉireann
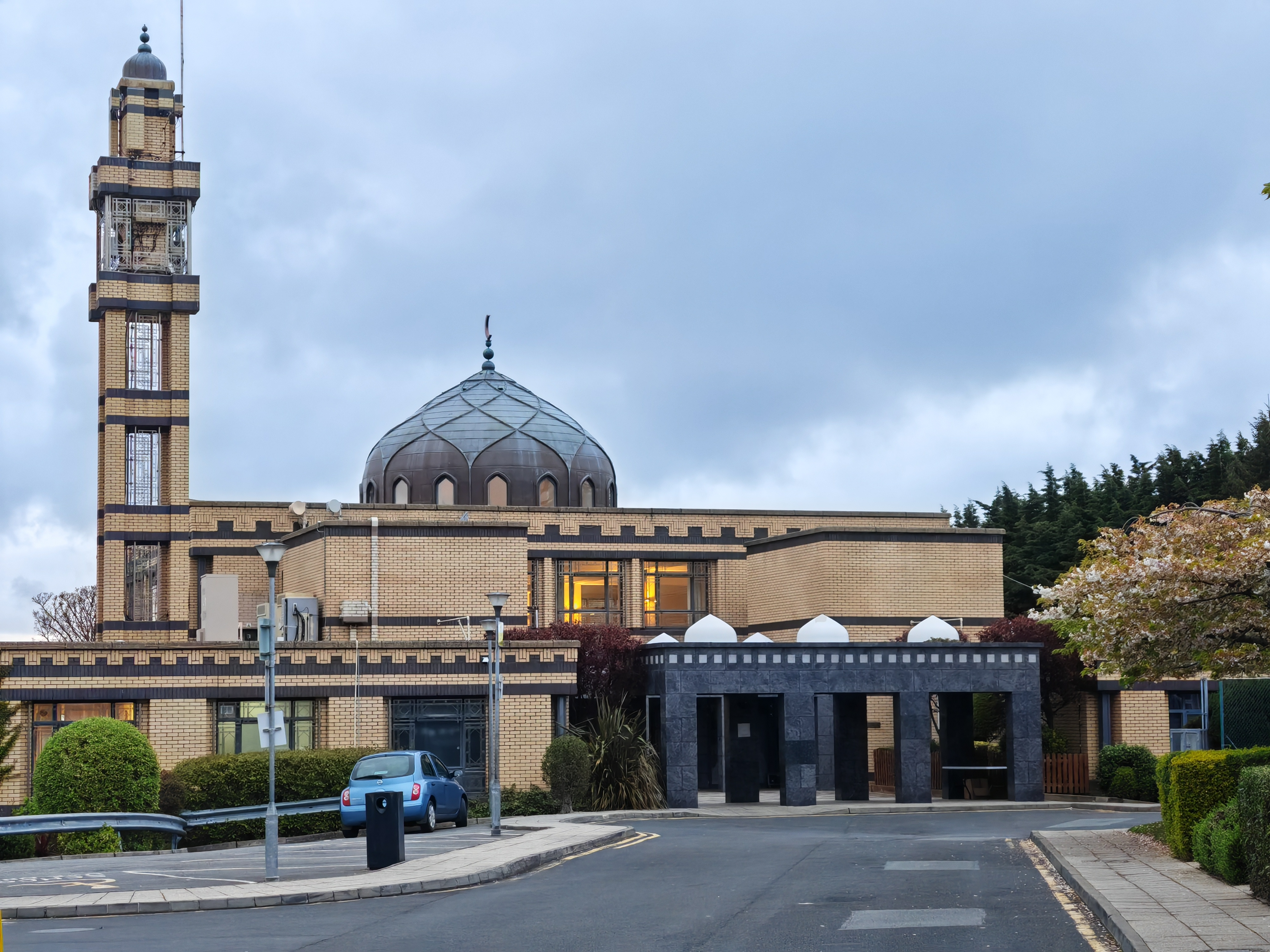
- Mosque in Clonskeagh

- Location within Dublin

Religion
- Affiliation: Muslim
- Sect: Sunni

Location
- Country: Ireland
- Interactive map of Islamic Cultural Centre of Ireland
- Coordinates: 53.304548°N 6.233721°W

Architecture
- Architects: Michael Collins & Associates
- Style: Islamic
- Funded by: Hamdan bin Rashid Al Maktoum
- Groundbreaking: 1994
- Completed: 1996
- Construction cost: IR£5 million

Specifications
- Capacity: 1,700
- Interior area: 5,000 m^{2} (54,000 sq ft)
- Minaret height: 20 m (66 ft)
- Site area: 3.5 acres (1.4 ha)
- Materials: steel, stainless steel, brick

Website
- islamireland.ie

The Islamic Cultural Centre of Ireland (ICCI Irish: Ionad Cultúrtha Ioslamach na hÉireann; Arabic: ٱلْمَرْكَزُ ٱلثَّقَافِيِّ ٱلْإِسْلَامِيِّ ٱلْأَيْرِلَنْدِيِّ, romanized: al-Markaz ath-Thaqāfīy al-ʾIslāmīy al-ʾAyrilandīy) is an Islamic complex, including a mosque, in Clonskeagh, Dublin, Ireland. It is funded by the al-Maktoum Foundation of Dubai and has a Sunni orientation.

== Formation ==
In 1992, Sheikh Hamdan bin Rashid Al Maktoum, Deputy Governor of Dubai and Minister of Finance and Industry in the United Arab Emirates, agreed to finance a piece of land including a building to house a school. Later on he agreed to sponsor the construction of an Islamic Centre on the same site. At the time, 4,000 Muslims lived in Ireland. Construction of the ICCI began in 1994. It was officially opened on 16 November 1996 by President Mary Robinson and Sheikh Hamdan Al Maktoum. It is located next to University College Dublin. The mosque and cultural centre include a main prayer hall, a restaurant, a library, meeting rooms, mortuary facilities, Nurul Huda Qur'anic school, a youth club room, an events hall for sporting activities/conferences, administrative offices and a shop. A primary school is also located on the premises.

The ICCI was designed by the Irish architect firm, Michael Collins & Associates. The layout is based on a square divided into nine smaller squares, with the mosque placed in the centre. The building is a steel frame structure with brick infill and is detailed with stainless steel.

== Organisations and activities ==
In November 1996, Imam Yahya Al-Hussein became the first Imam of the ICCI, with his administration, Mr. Fazel Ryklief and Dr. Mudafar Al-Tawash, who were the original administration of the Islamic Foundation of Ireland (IFI) at the time. They were running the operations of the ICCI while the IFI offices were closed. As of late 1997, they moved back to the IFI.

In late 1997, Imam Hussein Halawa and Mr. Nooh al-Kaddo oversaw the operations of the ICCI. The current Executive Director of the ICCI is Nooh Al Kaddo, an Iraqi native who moved from Liverpool to Dublin in 1997 to run the Islamic centre. The imam of the ICCI is Hussein Halawa, who came to Ireland from Egypt in 1996 and is also chairman of the Irish Council of Imams. The ICCI hosts the headquarters of ECFR.

The ICCI hosts the Muslim National School, a state funded primary school, with an Islamic ethos and with over 260 pupils. The religious department is sponsored by the al-Maktoum Foundation.

The Centre housed the headquarters of the International Association of Muslim Scholars (later International Union of Muslim Scholars) before it moved to Qatar.

Also the ICCI hosts the European College for Islamic Studies which holds correspondence courses for another Federation of Islamic Organizations in Europe (FIOE) central institution, the European Institute for Human Sciences. Analysts state that FIOE is an umbrella for Muslim Brotherhood organisations in Europe.

In 2018, it endorsed the No Vote for the Abortion Vote and the No vote for the removal of the blasphemy ban.

== See also ==
- Islam in the Republic of Ireland
- European Council for Fatwa and Research
- Alliance of Former Muslims (Ireland)
