= Blackpitts Mosque =

Mosque in Dublin, Ireland

- Mosc na gCuithí Dubha
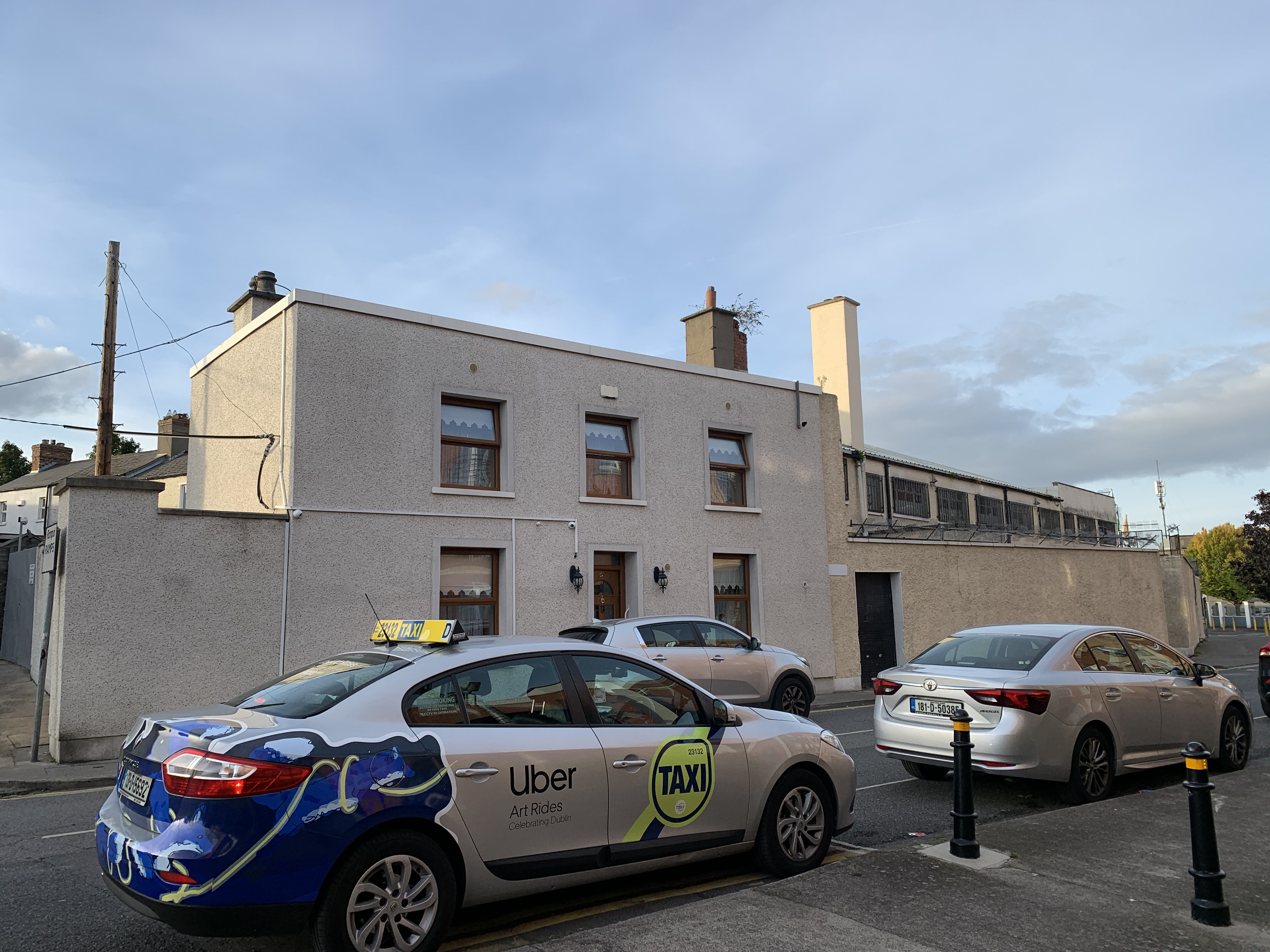

- Location within Central Dublin

Religion
- Affiliation: Muslim
- Sect: Sunni
- Status: Active

Location
- Location: 25–26 Blackpitts, Dublin
- Country: Ireland
- Interactive map of Blackpitts Mosque
- Coordinates: 53.335322°N 6.275540°W

Architecture
- Architect: JFOC Architects
- Style: Victorian and Mughal
- Funded by: Bari family
- Established: 1992
- Capacity: 700+

The Blackpitts Mosque (Irish: Mosc na gCuithí Dubha) is a mosque in the Blackpitts area of Dublin, Ireland. It has a Sunni orientation. It has a mostly Pakistani membership and is part of the Deobandi movement.

== History ==
The building was originally a distribution centre for International Clothing Holding’s retail operations and was owned by the Bari family. It began to be used for Islamic prayer by Pakistani and Muslim immigrants in 1992. In 2003, the company’s operations moved to Ballymount, leaving the building as a full-time mosque. At present, it is planned to remodel the building with Victorian and Mughal architecture, inspired by the George's Street Arcade and Iveagh Market.

It derives its name from the street on which it lies, which takes its name from the tanning vats that once stood there.

The mosque has a mostly Pakistani membership and services are held in Urdu, Arabic and English. The building is planning-approved to be rebuilt as a purpose-built mosque.

== See also ==
- Islam in the Republic of Ireland
