= Ciaran McCoy =

Contemporary Irish Artist

PIGSY
- Born: Ciarán McCoy; 1972, age 50; Dublin, Ireland
- Known for: Painting, Sculpture
- Style: Gestural style
- Movement: Intuitive Expressionism
- Website: https://pigsy.art/

Ciaran McCoy (born 17 October 1972) is an Irish contemporary artist based in Dublin, Ireland. PIGSY is the alter-ego of Ciaran McCoy who uses the pseudonym "PIGSY" in order to separate his work as an artist and his work as an architect. His works are primarily large scale expressionist paintings.

== Education & professional memberships ==
He was schooled through the Irish language at both primary and secondary school level and received additional schooling externally for his early diagnosed dyslexia. He is a graduate of Bolton Street Technological University and prior to qualifying as an architect, qualified as a draughtsman from Pearce College, Dublin.

He is a member of the Visual Artists Ireland and the Royal Institute of Architects of Ireland (RIAI).

== Exhibitions ==
"First Things Last" Solo Art Exhibition at La Casa Amarilla Galerie, Malaga, Spain: May 2024

"Lost in Thought" Solo Art Show at Ranelagh Arts Centre, 6 Main Street, Ranelagh, Dublin: April 2023

"LARBI" Group Art Show: A Slow Lane Gallery Presentation at Gallery X, Hume Street, Dublin, Ireland: August 2022

Ranelagh Visual Arts Summer Exhibition, Ranelagh Arts Centre, 6 Main Street, Ranelagh, Dublin, Ireland: Jul -August 2022

LCA Homíes Pop Art Exhibition, Art Homíes, Marbella, Spain: Jun - Sept 2022

Wish & Pop - La Colaboración de La Casa Amarilla, Seville, Spain: Feb- Mar 2022

"GLORIA" Slow Lane Gallery, Dublin, Ireland: Dec - Jan 2022

"Pina de las Tentaciones", La Casa Amarilla, Malaga, Spain: Dec - Jan 2022

Solo Exhibition: "Catharsis of Collapse", Kenmare Butter Market, Kerry, Ireland: Sept - Oct 2021

"Estival #OffYellowSummer, La Casa Amarilla Galerie, Malaga, Spain: Jul - Aug 2021

Solo Exhibition: "I Went to Mass", La Casa Amerilla Galerie, Malaga, Spain: Mar - Apr 2021

"Exploring the sense of Art from Ireland to Asia", ArtXplor, Singapore: Mar - May 2021

Pina y mas allá, La Casa Amarilla, Malaga, Spain: Dec - Jan 2021

Solo Exhibition "Seven Spanish Angels" DesignYard Gallery, South Frederick Street, Dublin, Ireland: Nov - Dec 2020

"Savage", In-Spire Gallery, Dublin, Ireland: Jul - Aug 2020

"The Other Art Fair London" Saatchi Art, Victoria House, London, UK: Oct 2018

Solo Exhibition "Nostalgia's Not What it Was", Fumbally Exchange, Dame Lane, Dublin Ireland: Oct 2017

"The Cock & Pussy Manifesto", Gallery X, Dublin, Ireland: Aug - Sept 2017

"All Art is Theft", The Kemp Gallery, Dublin, Ireland: Dec 2016

Solo Exhibition "I Find You Fascinating", The Kemp Gallery, Dublin, Ireland: Oct - Nov 2016

== Art residency ==
Artist in Residence, La Casa Amarilla Galerie, Malaga, Spain: April 2024 - May 2024

Artist in Residence, Ranelagh Arts Centre, Ranelagh, Dublin, Ireland: Jan 2023 - Mar 2024

Artist in Residence, La Casa Amarilla Galerie, Malaga, Spain: Aug 2020 - Jul 2021

== "PIGSY" short film ==
Ciaran McCoy / PIGSY was featured as the subject matter of film maker Mike Andrews' 2018 short film "PIGSY" and "PIGSY" was an official selection at the 2018 Galway Fim Festival.

== Awards ==
2013 Nomination for Best Emerging Practise: ODKM Architects, LPA House designed by Ciaran McCoy, Special Mention Winner.

2014 Architizer Awards: ODKM Architects shortlisted for Ranelagh House / LPA designed by Ciaran McCoy.
