= Millhouse =

Millhouse, or Millhouses, may refer to:

== People ==
- Eric Millhouse (1891–1950), South Australian lawyer and advocate for returned servicemen
- Robin Millhouse (1929–2017), South Australian politician
- Millhouse Van Houten, a fictional character from The Simpsons

== Places ==
- Millhouse, Argyll, a village in Argyll and Bute, Scotland
- Millhouse, Cumbria, a hamlet in Cumbria, England
- Millhouses, Barnsley, a suburb of Barnsley, England
- Millhouses, Sheffield, a suburb of the City of Sheffield, England

== Others ==
- Millhouse (film), a 1971 documentary film on Richard Milhous Nixon's career from 1946 to 1968
- Millhouse LLC, the asset management company of Roman Abramovich

== See also ==
- Millhouse Green
- Millhouses Park
- Mill House (disambiguation)
- Milhous (disambiguation)
- Mulhouse
