= Institute of Designers in Ireland =

Irish Institute of Design, founded 1972

- Abbreviation: IDI
- Formation: 1972
- Type: Professional body
- Legal status: Non Profit
- Purpose: The promotion of the design profession in Ireland
- Headquarters: We Work, Dublin Landings, North Wall Quay, Dublin 1, Ireland.
- Location: Ireland
- Region served: Ireland
- Members: 1500+
- President: David Wall

The Institute of Designers in Ireland (IDI) was formed in 1972 and is the professional body representing designers and design students from different disciplines who practice on the island of Ireland and abroad. The IDI is one of Ireland’s largest and oldest association of design professionals. The Institute is a membership-based not-for-profit organization.

== Activities ==
IDI is multi-disciplinary – representing designers in all design disciplines including Graphic Design, Interior Design, Product Design and across the entire spectrum of design. Its aims and function are to promote high standards of design, to foster professionalism and to emphasise designers' responsibility to society, to the client and to each other. IDI organizes to promote and advocate for Irish design. It works to encourage a universal standard of professional design practice.

== History ==
The IDI was originally known as The Society of Designers of Ireland (SDI) when it was founded in 1972 at meeting in the Shelbourne hotel in 1972 attended by 60 people. The first committee was set up by election at that meeting. The first President of the SDI was the distinguished Australian-born OPW principal architect Raymond McGrath. Other past–presidents include Robin Walker founder of Scott Tallon Walker and winner of two RIAI Triennial Gold Medals, Frank Ryan, Selma Harrington and Arthur Gibney who was also a former president of the Royal Institute of the Architects of Ireland(RIAI) and president of the Royal Hibernian Academy, RHA.

IDI was part of Design Ireland, established in January 2000, the collaborative body representing the IDI, RIAI, GDBA and ICAD. Design Ireland, was an initiative of the combined representative bodies of the Irish design community, established as a result of the Government review of the Irish design consultancy sector. For a number of years IDI was also associated with initiatives such as awarding The Frank Ryan Travel Bursary for design students and the annual William H. Walsh Lecture Since the 1990s, the Institute has run an annual IDI Awards and GDA awards programme for both design students and professional designers along with a regular programme of events and training. The IDI Awards is one of the key events in the design calendar in Ireland These design awards are Ireland’s only multi-disciplinary professional design prizes. Since their inception, the IDI Awards have recognised excellence and innovation in creative practice on the island of Ireland.

== Membership and Initiatives ==
Over the course of its four decades, IDI's membership numbers have grown, and in January 2018 it stood at over 1500 members. The current IDI President is Mary Doherty, founder of Red Dog, who replaced Dominic Southgate of Boxclever in November 2022. Roisin Lafferty of Kingston Lafferty Design was the 2019 president. The President in 2018 was Kirk McCormack, an architect who replaced Kim Mackenzie Doyle as President. The 2016/17 president was Ms George Boyle, an architect and social entrepreneur Its Past-President for 2015/16 is Cork based designer and CIT lecturer Marc O'Riain, who was elected in April 2014. Michael D. Higgins, President of Ireland, is Patron of The Institute of Designers in Ireland.

in the past number of years IDI has been associated with two public initiatives started by IDI President 2017/18 Kim Mackenzie Doyle: IDI Mind over Matter, an initiative supporting mental health awareness and also Why Design, an initiative aimed at correcting the gender imbalance in the design sector by encouraging more women into a design career. In September 2020, IDI appointed former Dynamo agency director Charlotte Barker as its inaugural chief executive. She won the 2017 IAPI Doyenne Award for women in leadership and served previously on board of the Institute of Advertising Practitioners in Ireland (IAPI)
