= Ahlul Bayt Islamic Centre =

Islamic center in Ireland

Coordinates: 53.30989477480579°N 6.247436944132903°W

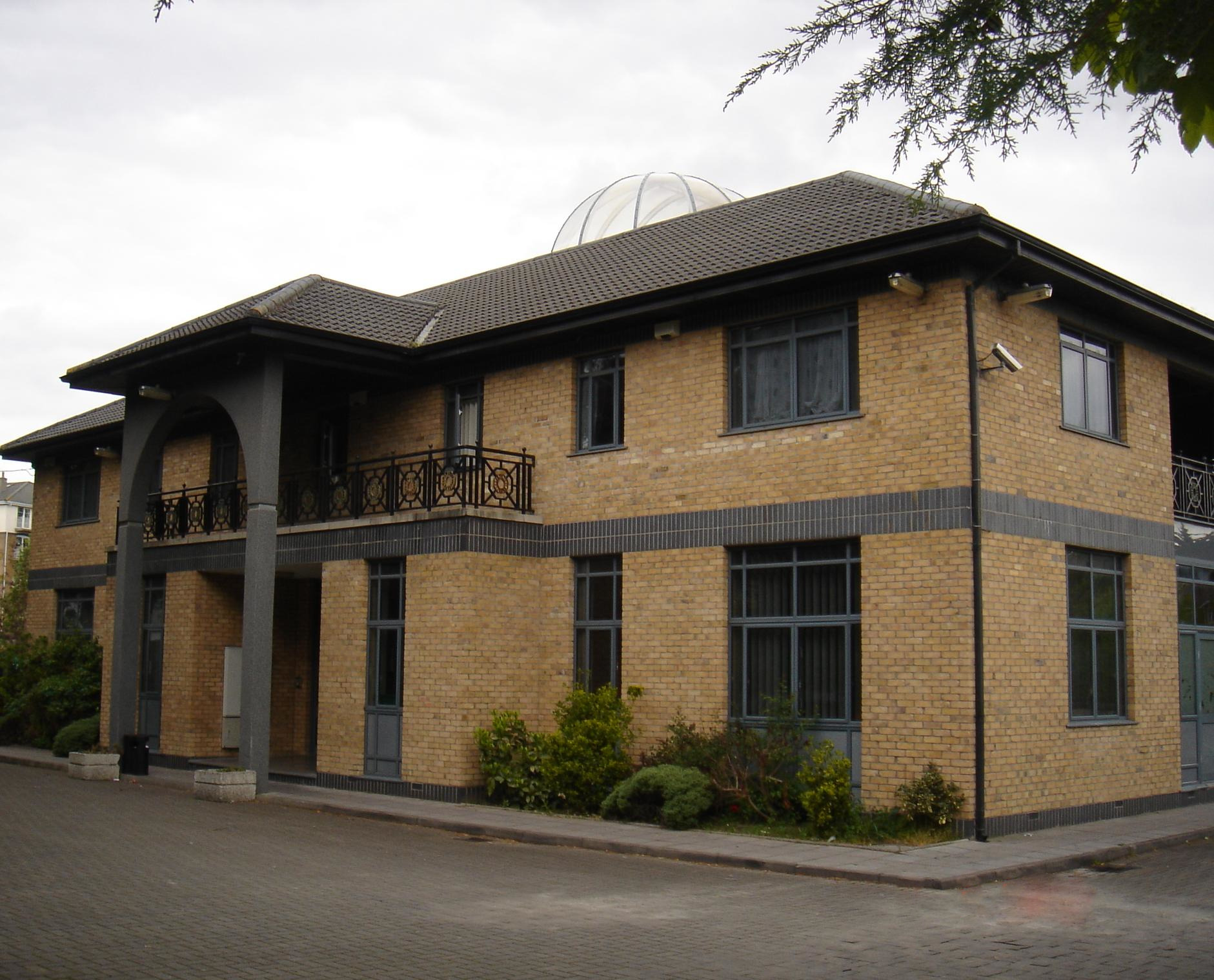
Front view of The Ahlul Bayt Islamic Centre in 2006.

The Ahlul Bayt Islamic Centre is the main Shia Islamic centre in Ireland and is situated at Milltown Bridge, Dublin. It is commonly known as ‘Hussainia’ and was previously the only Shia Muslim Islamic centre and mosque in Ireland.

It draws Shia members from throughout the country, particularly at festival times and during Muharram. There are about 6,000 Shias working, studying and living in Ireland.

== Formation ==
The centre was founded in September 1996 by the imam Ali Al-Saleh. The centre was built from personal funds under the supervision of Ayatollah Gholamreza Hassani.

== Administration and Activities ==
The centre's imam is Ali Al-Saleh, a graduate of the Royal College of Surgeons in Ireland and a religious scholar who studied in the Hawza of Najaf, Iraq and Qum, Iran. The centre has very good relationships with many politicians and diplomats of Ireland and also with the two other Islamic Centres of Ireland. Al Saleh is a member of the Irish Council of Imams, in which he represents the Shia community. The centre is a resource for Shia Muslims in Dublin.

== Facilities ==
The centre includes a library, a main prayer hall, a kitchen, administrative offices and ablution areas.
