= Fumbally Lane =

Historic street in The Liberties, central Dublin

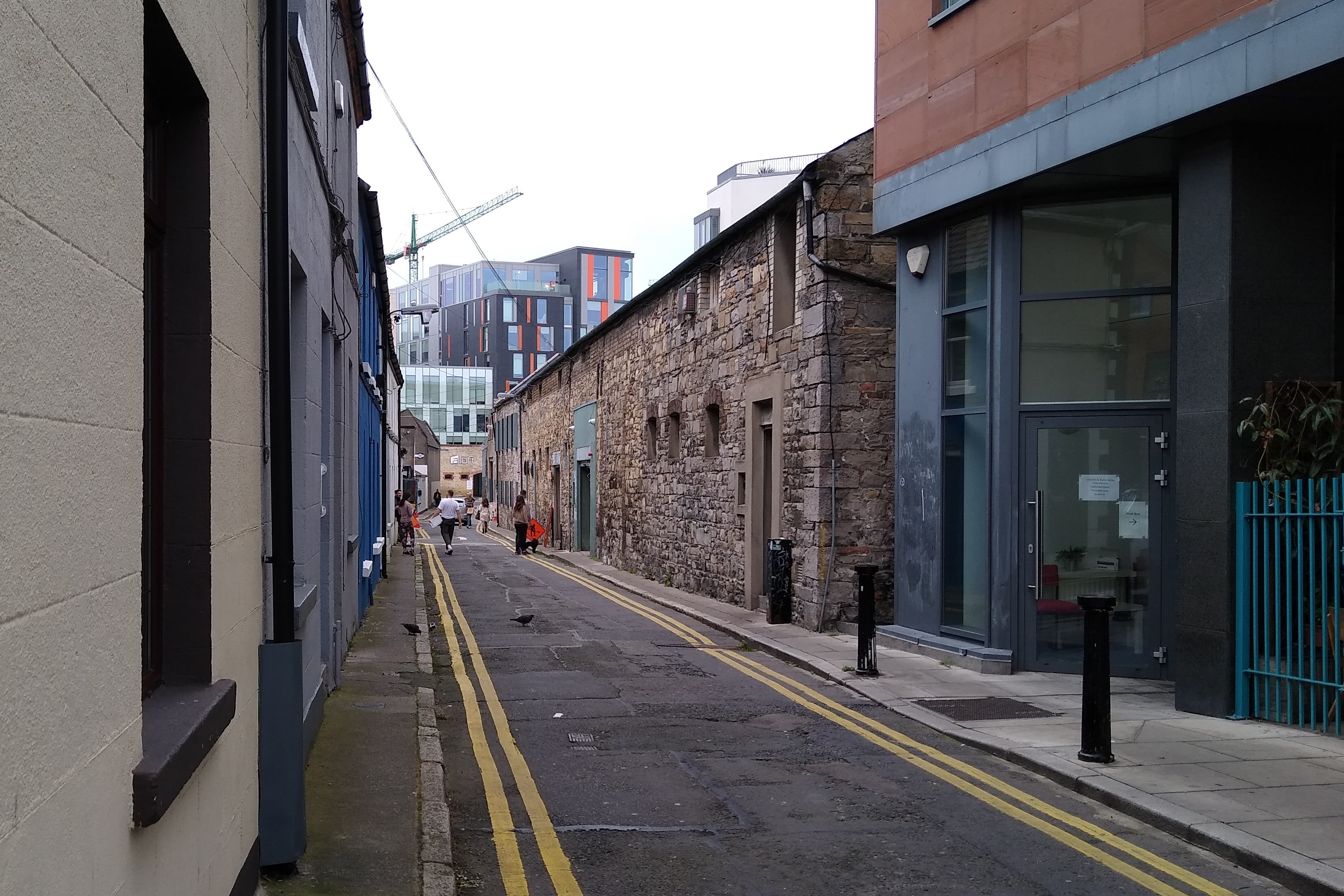
- Fumbally Lane in 2021

- Location within Central Dublin
- Native name: Lána Fumbally (Irish)
- Namesake: A corruption of the Huguenot surname Fombely (Fombela, Fonveille)
- Length: 140 m (460 ft)
- Width: 11 metres (36 ft)
- Location: Dublin, Ireland
- Postal code: D08
- Coordinates: 53.33697°N 6.27402°W
- west end: Blackpitts
- east end: New Street South

Fumbally Lane (Irish: Lána Fumbally) is a narrow and historic street in Dublin, Ireland, south of the city centre in The Liberties. Described by the architectural historian Christine Casey as being "In name and character perhaps the most evocative of all the Liberties' streets", it connects Blackpitts to New Street and is close to St Patrick's Cathedral. It is named after the Fombely (or Fonveille) family, members of Dublin's Huguenot community who lived in the area until at least the mid-18th century.

== History ==
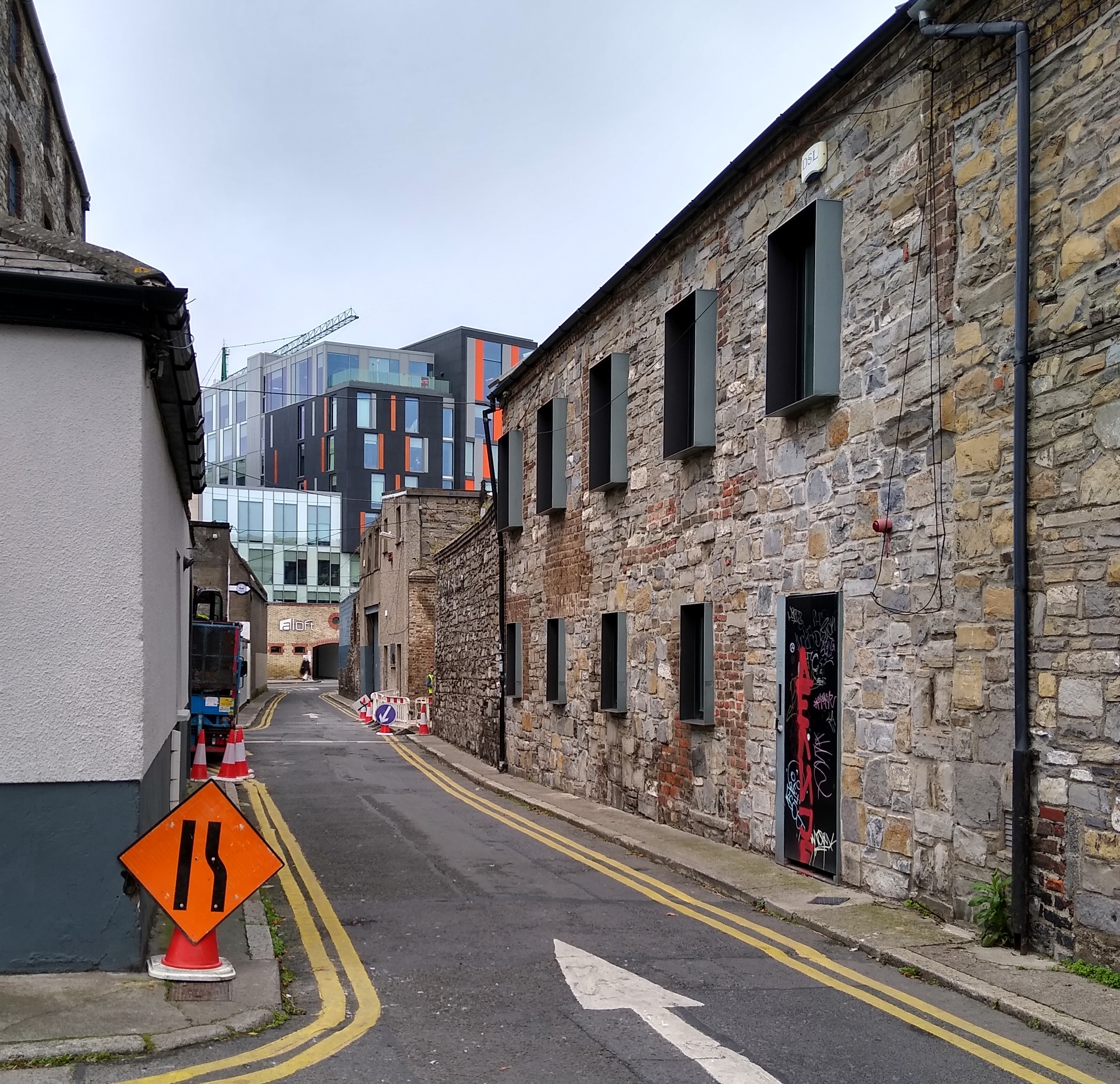
Buildings on the lane

This area was originally part of the Liberty of Thomas Court and Donore (later called the Earl of Meath's Liberty), having been granted by Henry VIII to Sir William Brabazon, whose ancestors were later the Earls of Meath, after the dissolution of the monasteries in 1538.

This location was then on the fringes of the expanding 18th-century city when the lane itself was set out by local brewer and Quaker Jacob Poole in 1721 to connect Blackpitts (where he had property) to New Street. The lane has long had mixed industrial and residential use. Historically, tanning brewing and associated industries flourished in this part of Dublin, partly because the River Poddle is close by. The industrial heritage of the area even dates back even to the mid 17th century and is linked to and influenced by both Quakers and Huguenots. In 2006 archaeologists found evidence of medieval leather tanning off Fumbally Lane and nearby New Street with wood-lined soaking pits and elaborate ditch systems. They also identified that one of the existing large old former brewery buildings on Fumbally dates from the 1740s.

Particularly brewing flourished here in the Fumbally/Blackpitts area since the mid 18th century. It is very possible that the first Dublin porter was brewed here. The Poole and Taylor families, who were related, had brewing interests here from at least that time and before. Poole Street in Dublin 8 is named for the family.

From 1779, Samuel Madder operated the Blackpitts Porter Company on the north of the lane, he acquired a brewery from a James Farrell. In 1830, John Busby a distiller, acquired a brewery property in Fumbally and erected a new distillery here. This stone faced building features his initials JB and 1836 on a 'cast iron water tank'. This inscription can still be seen today. This particular refurbished 19th century stone faced building is part of the Fumbally Studio development and now home to both apartments and an office building.

In 1862, John Busby listed as "a licensed distiller and maltster" was still operating in Fumbally but shortly afterwards sold out.

The City of Dublin Brewery was situated on the corner of Fumbally and Backpitts and between 1867 and 1883 they took over the 'Busby' buildings including a still house spirit store and a brewhouse. Later the complex was used for other industrial uses including use as a textile factory in the late 19th century, many of the buildings on the brewing complex and along the lane later fell into disuse or dereliction. A significant detached three storey house possibly dating from the 1720s existed in the street until the late 1980s. According to an unpublished thesis, this rare example of an early Irish house may have been built by the relations of Jacob Poole, a Quaker Taylor family, who had brewing interests here and in Marrowbone Lane. It may have incorporated offices for the brewery owner, as a deed from 1789 connects it to the brewery. This house was later used as a textile factory, housed 'Blair's Fancy Linens' and was subsequently burnt down and demolished circa 1990. Now only the large curved entrance walls and a cobble forecourt remain.

According to the 1901 census, 68 people are listed as living on Fumbally Lane, while approximately 100 residents are recorded in the 1911 census, and 62 in the 1926 census.

== Origin of name ==
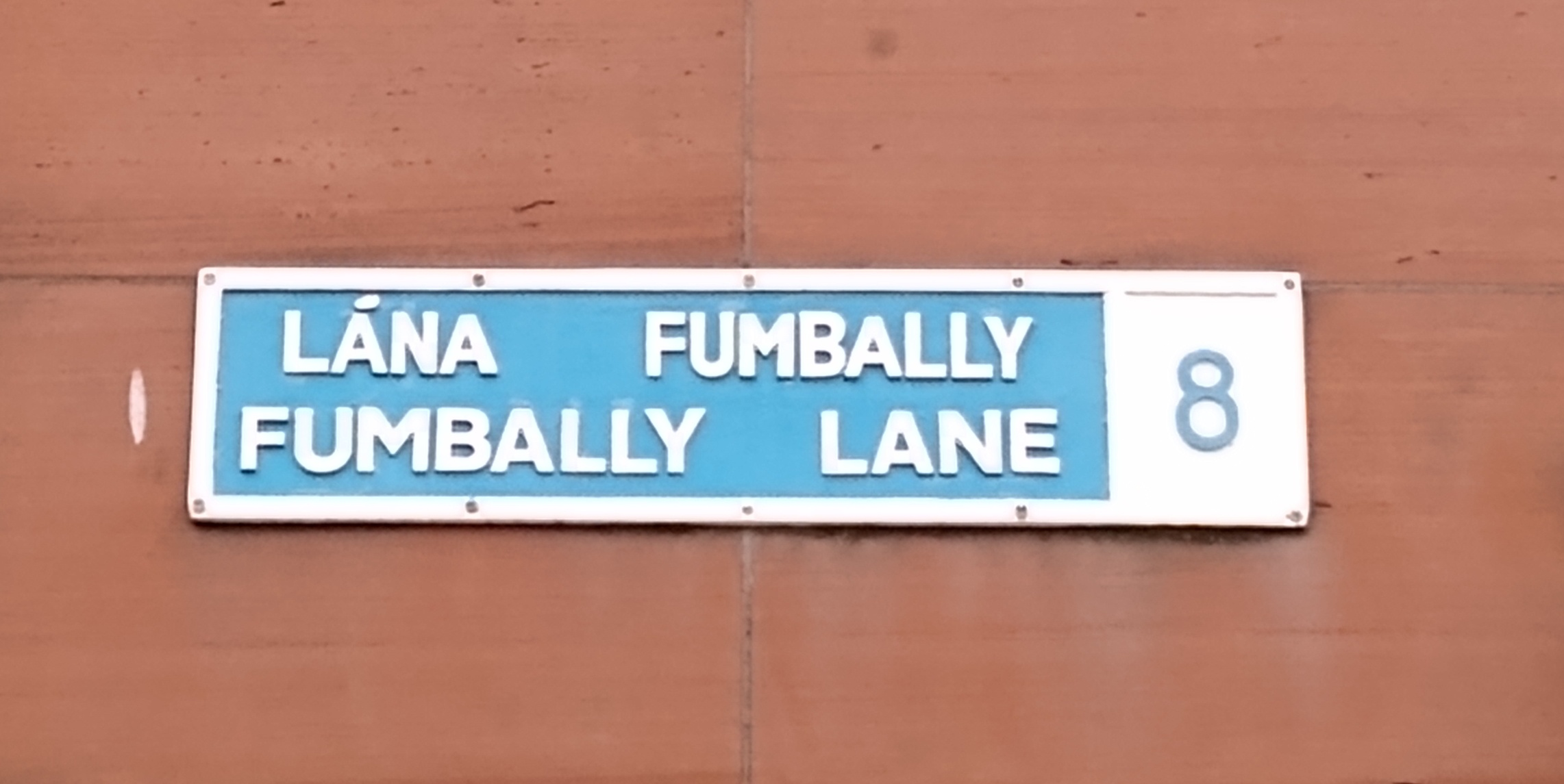
Fumbally Lane street sign

The name Fumbally is a peculiar one that has provoked a number of theories as to its origin. The street is officially called Fumbally Lane today or Lána Fumbally in Irish. It has not always been called that and has had many name variations since 1721.

The lane first appears in Charles Brooking's map of 1728 without a name and with variations in subsequent maps including John Rocque's map of 1756 as 'Bumbailiff's Lane' and in Wilson's map of 1798 as 'Fumbailie's Lane'. While it is suggested by the Rev. Christopher Teeling McCready in Dublin Street Names: Dated and Explained (1892) that Fumbally's Lane (as it was then referred to in Thom's Directory) was a "corruption of Bumbailiff's-lane", (Note: "Bumbailiff" was historically used a derogatory term for "a bailiff or underbailiff employed in serving writs, making arrests.") this derivation is questioned by other sources.

Multiple sources suggest that the name derives from a local Huguenot family named Fontvielle, Fomboilie, Fombily, Fombela, Fonveille and/or Fombally. (Note: The Fombally or Fombely name appears differently in a wide variety of sources.) For example, the architectural historian Christine Casey refers to the street's association with a Huguenot family called Fombily and, appearing to confirm this, Peter Pearson names David Fombily and Anthony Fombily who were described as "skinners" in the area. Pearson, in reference to a study on the houses in the Liberties by Peter Walsh, confirms this from a 1741 lease given on two houses on 'Fombily's Lane'. There is further evidence from a Registry of Deeds entry, dated 7 October 1762, which refers to members of the Fombely family and which George Dames Burtchaell describes in the Journal of the Royal Society of Antiquaries of Ireland (1893) as "absolutely conclusive as to the origin of the name". A reference in A History of the Royal Dublin Society (published in 1915) refers to a Royal Dublin Society prize for life drawing which was won by a "Mr. Fombally" in March 1746. These all suggest that a Fombally or Fombely family resided in Dublin and were associated with this lane in the mid-18th century. A 1788 Domestic Intelligence report in The Gentleman's Magazine mentions an assault on the corner of "Fombally's Lane".

Fumbally's Lane is the name which James Joyce uses in chapter 3 of his novel Ulysses (1922) where he refers to "the tanyard smells".

== Today ==
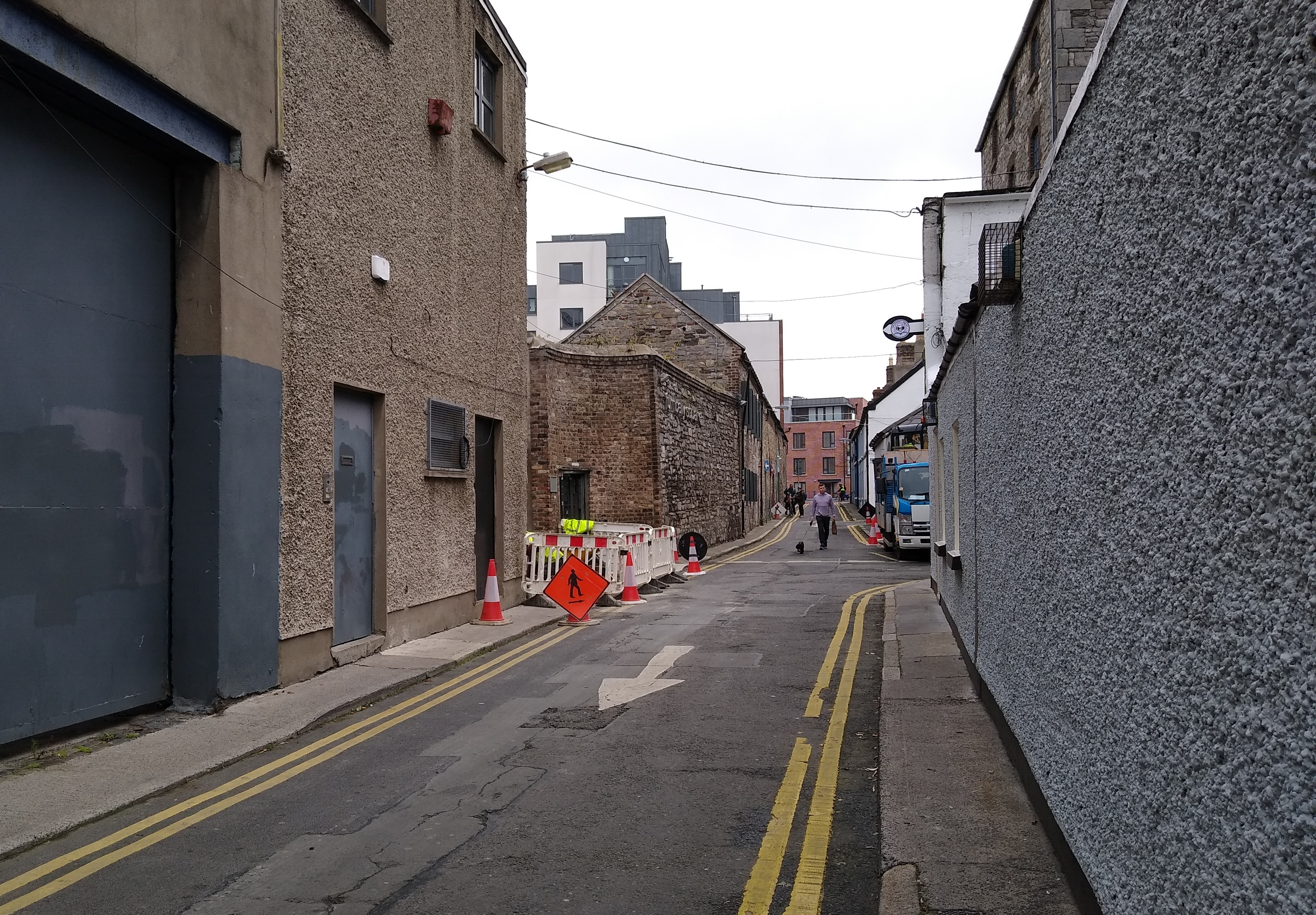
Fumbally Lane in 2021

Physical evidence of the 18th and 19th century brewing and distilling industry buildings remain on both sides of the lane today, including storehouses and a five-storey malthouse. Most of these remnants of its industrial past have been converted to modern office use.

As of the 21st century, Fumbally Lane contains residential properties including both new apartments, 19th-century homes and several possibly late 18th-century houses. It is also home to clusters of mainly design creative businesses based in Fumbally Court which is a large 19th-century distillery building, remodelled as offices c. 1990, and Fumbally Square, a development of new office space developed in 2005. In Dublin: An Urban History (first published in 1989), the architect and historian Niall McCullough described the street as a "unique remnant of the mixed residential and industrial architecture that characterized the area".

A number of local enterprises have borrowed the Fumbally name including the Fumbally Café and Fumbally Exchange. The latter is a non-profit community of design professionals founded in Fumbally Square in 2010 and now located in the adjacent Blackpitts area.
