= Milhous =

Milhous(e) may refer to:

- Katherine Milhous (1894–1977), newspaper illustrator
- David Milhous (born 1967), film editor
- Richard Milhous Nixon (1913–1994), thirty-seventh president of the United States
- Hannah Milhous Nixon (1885–1967), mother of President Richard Milhous Nixon
- Milhous Van Houten, character from The Simpsons

== See also ==
- Millhouse (disambiguation)
