= Irish Council of Imams =

Islamic organization based in Ireland

- Formation: 15 September 2006
- Type: Religious organization
- Location: Ireland
- Affiliations: Islam

The Irish Council of Imams is an umbrella organisation for most Islamic establishments in Ireland. Its formation was announced in a press release on 15 September 2006. It represents 35 imams in Ireland, of both the Sunni and Shia denominations, but excludes Ahmadiyya. The chairman is Imam Hussein Halawa (Islamic Cultural Centre of Ireland), the deputy chairman is Imam Yahya Al-Hussein (Islamic Foundation of Ireland), and the general secretary is Belkacem Belfedhal. The Council consists of representatives from Cork, Galway, Limerick, Waterford, Meath, and Dublin mosques.

A previous attempt to establish an all-Ireland Muslim council, similar to the Muslim Council of Britain was the Supreme Muslim Council of Ireland by a controversial Shaheed Satardien.

Among the first actions was the setting of a common date for Ramadan for all Irish Muslims and non-Irish Muslims living in Ireland.

However the imposition of a Ramadan date based solely on astronomical calculations has been widely contested by those who only believe in visual observation of the moon, to determine the new Islamic month, as well as questioning the unelected and unrepresentative nature of the Council.

On 22 January 2016, founding member of the Council, Shaykh Umar Al-Qadri, resigned due to concerns about the lack of accountability, transparency and democracy in the Council.
