= Dublin Mosque =

Mosque in Dublin, Ireland

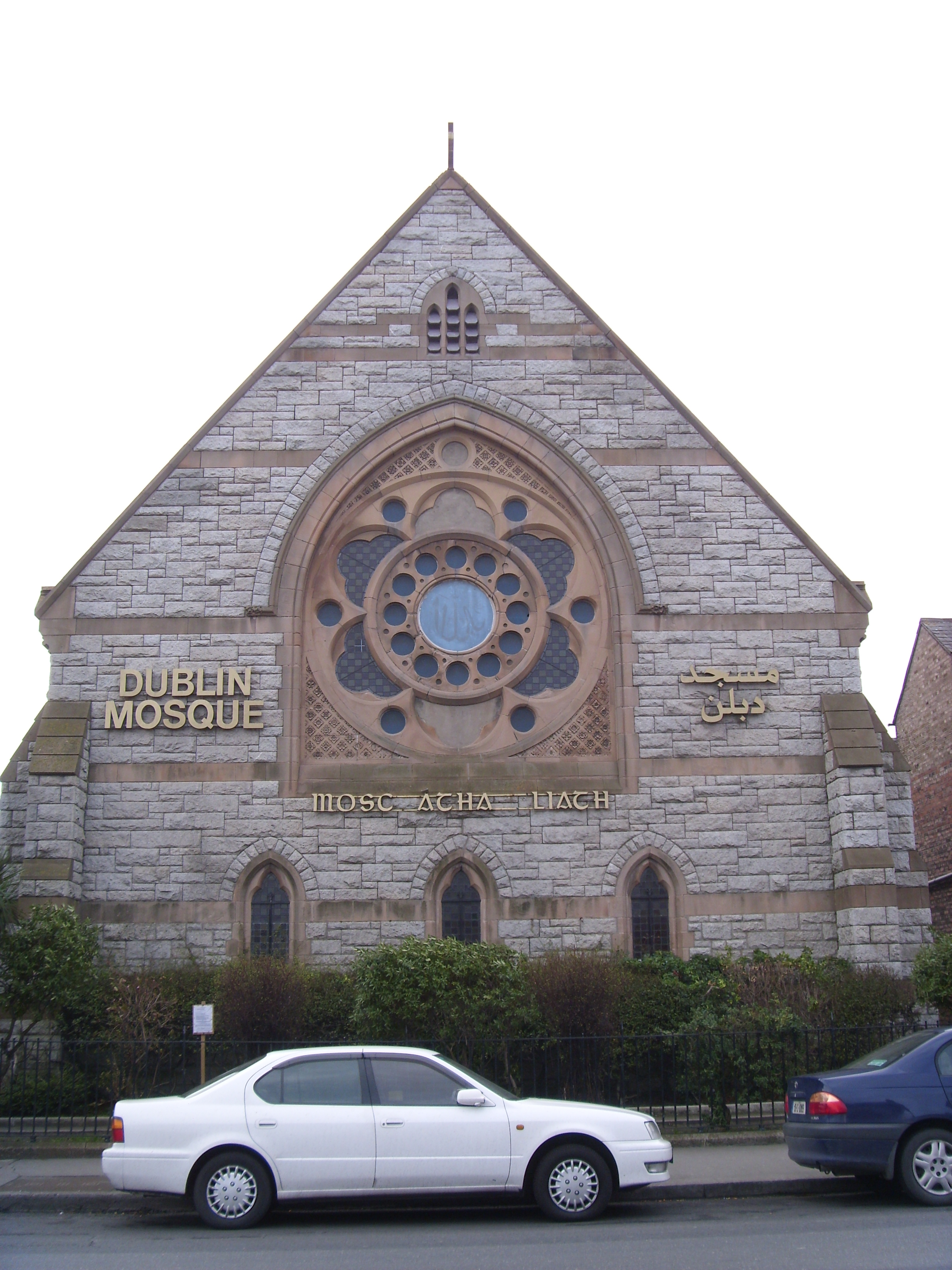

Religion
- Affiliation: Islam

Location
- Location: Dublin, Ireland
- Interactive map of Dublin Mosque
- Coordinates: 53°19′53″N 6°16′57″W

Architecture
- Type: Church
- Style: Romanesque
- Completed: 1884 (1983 converted)

Specifications
- Capacity: 500
- Dome: 0
- Minaret: 0

Website
- islaminireland.com

Dublin Mosque (Irish: Mosc Átha Cliath; Arabic: مَسْجِدُ دُبْلِنٍ, romanized: Masjid Dublin) is a mosque on the South Circular Road, Dublin in Ireland. It is the headquarters of the Islamic Foundation of Ireland.

The Donore Presbyterian Church was constructed in the 1860s in the style of a 13th-century English church. In 1983 the building on the South Circular Road was bought by the Islamic Foundation of Ireland and converted into a mosque.

== See also ==
- Islam in Ireland
