= Mill House, Adlington =

Country house in Cheshire, England

Coordinates: 53.30790°N 2.14073°W

Mill House is a former country house in the parish of Adlington, Cheshire, England. It is dated 1603, and was built by Sir Uriah Legh, of the Legh family of Adlington, as a dower house. Alterations were made to it in the middle of the 18th century and in the early 20th century. It is a timber-framed building with some plastered brick infill; it has a Kerridge stone-slate roof. The house is recorded in the National Heritage List for England as a designated Grade II* listed building.

== See also ==
- Grade II* listed buildings in Cheshire East
