= 10 Mill Street, Dublin =

18th-century building in Dublin, Ireland

10 Mill Street
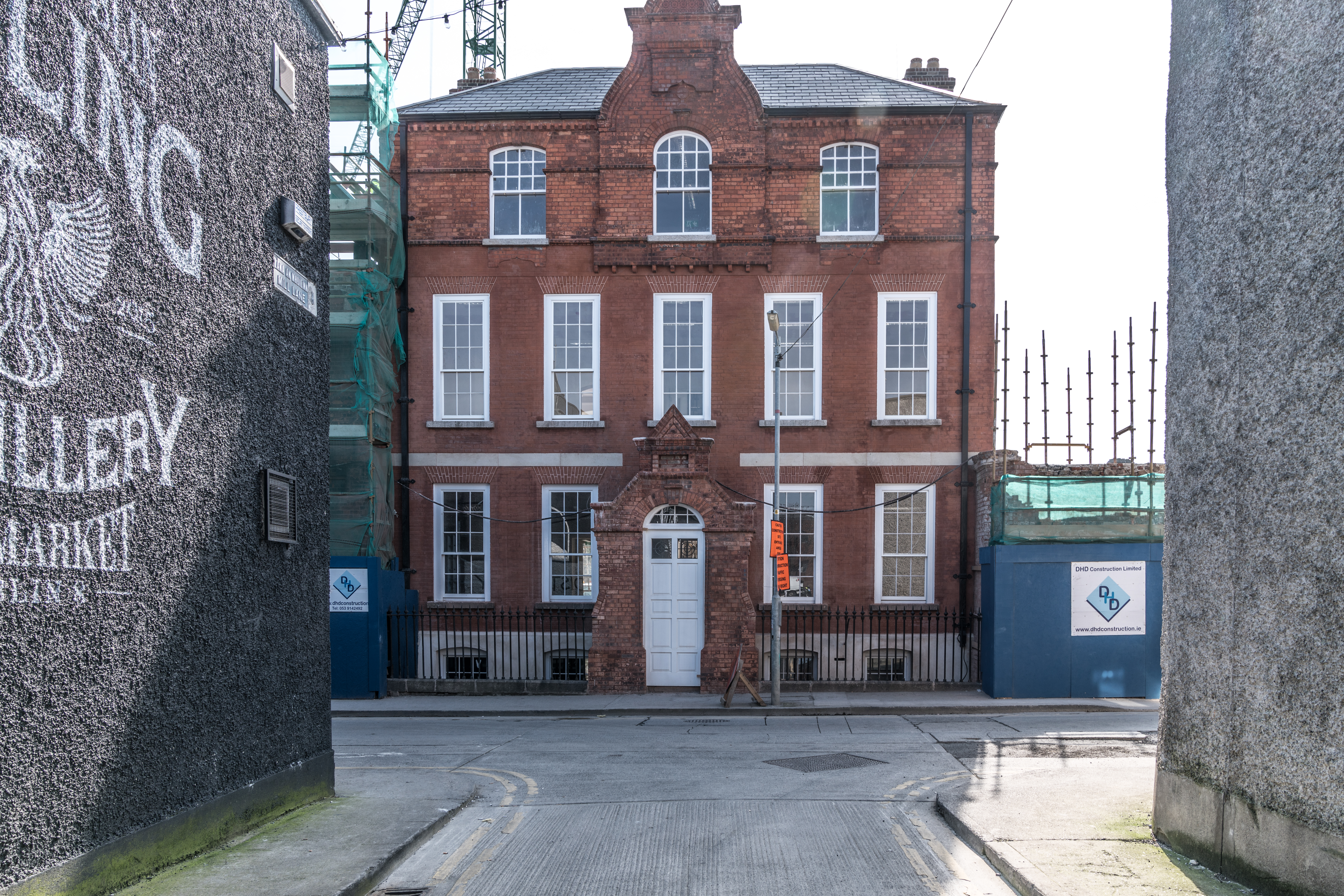
- 10 Mill Street, Blackpitts
- Interactive map of the 10 Mill Street area

General information
- Architectural style: Mainly Victorian era facade with early 18th century interior
- Location: 10 Mill Street, Blackpitts, The Liberties, Dublin, Ireland
- Coordinates: 53°20′14″N 6°16′39″W
- Year built: c. 1720

Design and construction
- Architect: George Palmer Beater (1894)
- Designations: Protected Structure (RPS 5247)

10 Mill Street, Dublin is an early 18th-century house in the Blackpitts area of The Liberties, in Dublin, Ireland which terminates a vista down Mill Lane from Newmarket.

The site of the house was originally used as a mill, before being granted to William Brabazon, 1st Earl of Meath. His family built the house there c. 1720 with a twin gable sometimes referred to as a Dutch Billy style. The house, which is included in the Record of Protected Structures maintained by Dublin City Council, was partially restored between 2015 and 2017 to its later mainly Victorian-Gothic Revival appearance externally.

== History ==
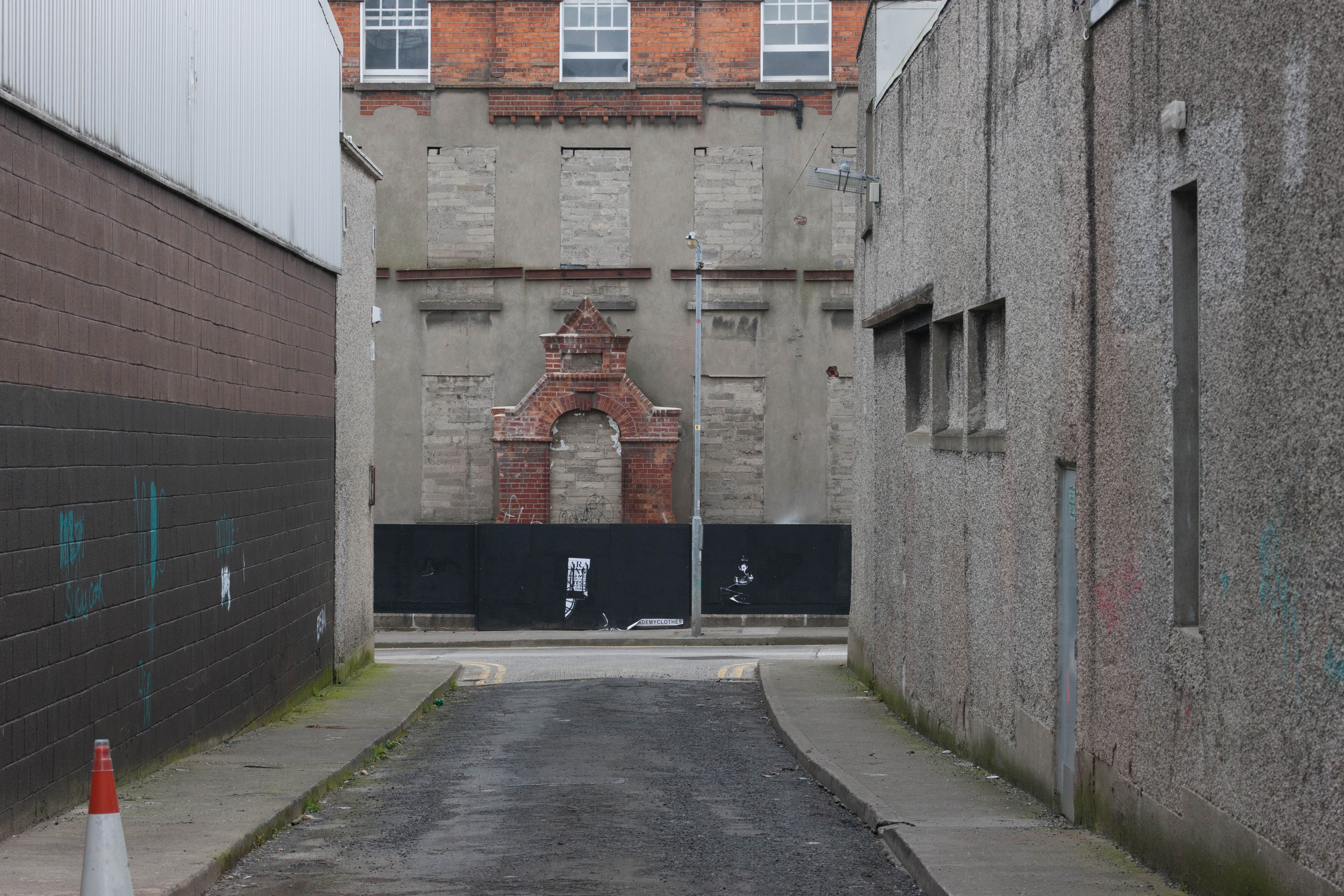
The Mill Street House prior to restoration

The site was originally home to a 13th-century double watermill that redirected water from the River Poddle. The mill was owned by Thomas's Abbey monks and was granted to William Brabazon, 1st Earl of Meath, when Henry VIII dissolved the monasteries. The remains of the millpond to the rear of the house were still in existence until the 1970s.

The current structure was built c. 1720 as a dower house by the Brabazon family, who were Earls of Meath. It can be clearly identified on John Rocque's map of Dublin of 1756–62.

The house was acquired and used as a school by the Congregation of Christian Brothers in 1819 and the Irish Church Missions in 1852. It appears on an Ordnance Survey Ireland map of 1864 as the 'Ragged School'.

George Palmer Beater later remodeled the house in 1894, so it could be used as a Methodist Mission and school. The original early 18th century stone doorcase which it is proposed may have been carved by William Kidwell, with engaged partially fluted columns was at that stage put into storage. It was later moved to the Guinness hopstore for safekeeping although its whereabouts are now unknown.

In the 1930s, the building was used as a rubber factory.

It was later bought by Eircom.

=== Restoration ===
Since the 1980s, the building was derelict and had been vandalised. In 2014, a planning application proposed the restoration as part of a mixed-use development and 400-bed student housing. Work started on the building in 2015, with support from the Department of Arts, Heritage, Regional, Rural and Gaeltacht Affairs as part of its 2016 Built Heritage Investment Scheme. The restoration was undertaken by Dublin-based Creedon Group and Dubai-based Global Student Accommodation.

The building was opened to the public as part of Open House Dublin 2017, and is being used as offices for Teeling Distillery.

== Design ==
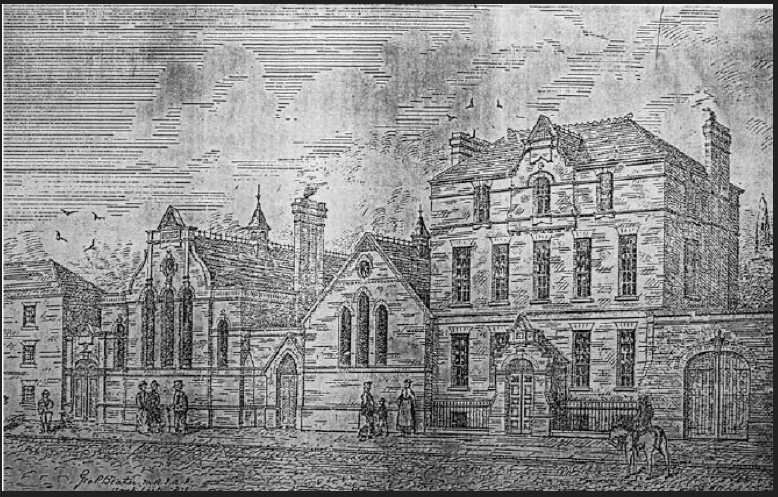
An etching of 10 Mill Street published in The Irish Builder of 1871.

The National Inventory of Architectural Heritage describes it as "one of the most important surviving early 18th-century houses in The Liberties", and the house is noted as being notable for having one of the earliest sets of engaged door columns in Dublin, foreshadowing the trend in later Georgian Dublin. The structure originally had a twin gable, a style of house which was influenced by French Huguenots fleeing mainland Europe when the Edict of Fontainebleau was revoked, and the arrival of Flemish and Dutch Protestant refugees in Dublin after the Battle of the Boyne. The building is one of few buildings of the 'Dutch Billy' design that survive in the area, albeit without its original twin gable intact.

When the house was renovated and heavily remodeled 1894, it was largely reclad in factory made red brick with a gothic revival facade although much of the interior including the especially fine interior staircase was retained.
