= Raidió Rí-Rá =

Irish language radio station

- Ireland
- Broadcast area: Ireland via the Internet; Leinster via DAB+
- Frequencies: DAB+: FáilteDAB; FM

Programming
- Language: Irish
- Format: Contemporary hit radio

Ownership
- Operator: Raidió X Teoranta

History
- First air date: March 2008
- Former names: Raidió X

Links
- Webcast: Listen Live
- Website: www.rrr.ie

Raidió Rí-Rá (Irish pronunciation: [ˈɾˠadʲiːoː ˈɾˠiː ˈɾˠaː]), is an Irish language chart music radio station broadcasting on the internet, DAB+ and, for approximately one month a year, on FM radio. The station was founded in 2008 and has offices on Harcourt Street in Dublin. It broadcasts from its studio at Fumbally Exchange in The Liberties.

== History ==
Raidió Rí-Rá was created to mark Seachtain na Gaeilge in March 2008 under the working title of Raidió X. Following a competition, its name was changed to Raidió Rí-Rá. The station was created as part of a collaboration between Digital Audition Productions and Conradh na Gaeilge to create an Irish language chart music radio station for young people. It broadcasts 24 hours a day with music and the latest pop news in Irish.

During March each year, Raidió Rí-Rá broadcasts on FM in Dublin, Cork, Galway and, prior to 2011, Limerick, to mark Seachtain na Gaeilge.

As of 2014, the station was broadcasting on DAB digital radio in Dublin and Waterford. During March 2011, it also broadcast on DAB as part of the South-East DAB Trial. It also launched a smartphone app.

The station proposed to obtain sufficient funding and a full national license on FM radio from the Broadcasting Authority of Ireland. In the interim, the station proposed to be available on Saorview, Ireland's Digital terrestrial television service.

Following the launch of FáilteDAB in 2025, it became possible to listen to Raidió Rí-Rá on DAB+ throughout Dublin and the wider Leinster area.

== See also ==
- List of Irish-language media
- List of Celtic-language media
- Radio in Ireland
