= Fumbally Exchange =

Creative community in Dublin, Ireland

Fumbally Exchange CLG
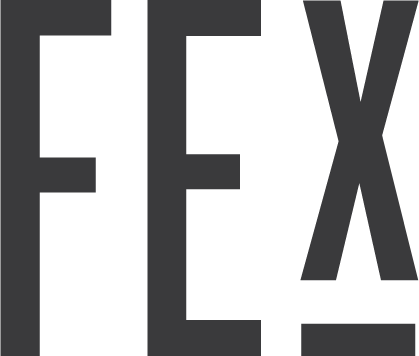
- Type: Company Limited by Guarantee
- Industry: Culture
- Founded: Dublin City (2010)
- Founder: George Boyle
- Headquarters: Dublin 8, Ireland
- Area served: Ireland
- Key people: George Boyle (Strategy Lead, 2010) Ciarán Ferrie (Community Director, 2010) Terry Quigley (Finance Officer, 2010)
- Website: fumballyexchange.com

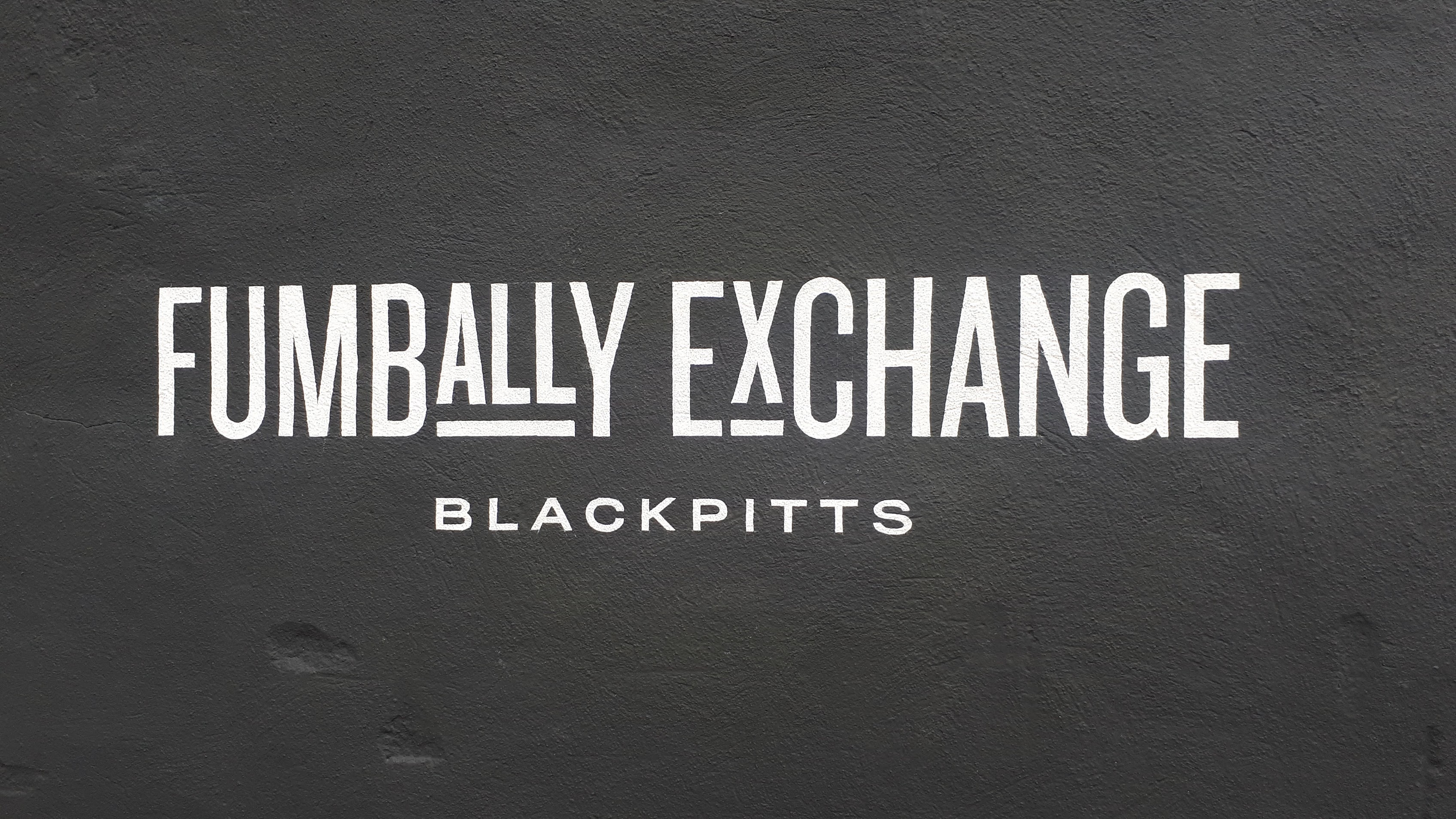
Painted sign for Fumbally Exchange, Blackpitts, Dublin

Fumbally Exchange (pronounced fum-BAL-ee (/fʌmˈbæli/) (FEx) is an Irish nonprofit collective of designers, creative professionals, artists and entrepreneurs operating from shared workspaces, galleries and studios. Headquartered in The Liberties, Dublin and Waterford Viking Triangle, it was founded on Dublin’s Fumbally Lane in April 2010 by architect George Boyle following the closure of Murray Ó Laoire Architects during the Irish economic downturn.

Envisaged as a "recession response" to support individuals, enterprises or other entities impacted by fallout from the Great Recession, specifically in Ireland's design industries, the exchange grew quickly into a coherent creative community with a civic mandate, leveraging low-cost subscriptions and skillsets of members to cultivate projects of urban regeneration, neighbourhood consolidation, innovation in start-up enterprise, repurposing old buildings and vacant places/spaces, providing experiential, experimental and exploratory learning modules and fostering a collaborative can-do culture among small, micron and nano businesses.

== History ==
Fumbally Exchange was established as a not-for-profit design and innovation hub in April 2010 on Fumbally Lane in Dublin’s Liberties and was formally launched by Tánaiste and Minister for Foreign Affairs and Trade, Eamon Gilmore in June 2011 by which time there were over 40 start-up businesses operating from the space. The name was partly inspired by the Metropolitan Exchange in Brooklyn, New York, a collaborative workplace that Time magazine listed as one of the "top ten places to watch in 2010". In a 2011 feature on the aftermath of the economic crash in Europe, the Wall Street Journal highlighted the Fumbally Exchange's innovative response to the challenges facing the country in the wake of massive unemployment and the economic downturn.

A photo of the interior of the Fumbally Exchange headquarters at Blackpitts, Dublin

In 2011, the initiative won the Diageo Arthur Guinness Fund Social Entrepreneur Award, and a Social Entrepreneurs Ireland award in 2012. By 2012, affiliate branches were active across Ireland, Northern Ireland, Scotland and Europe.

In 2012 a second office was opened in Balbriggan, Co. Dublin by Minister for Health, James Reilly, where it was seen as a vital step in the economic regeneration of the town. In 2013, the head office relocated to the former Hely’s Printing Works building on Dame Lane in Dublin’s city centre and opened a new location in Waterford’s Viking Quarter supported by Waterford City and County Council. In 2014, the Dame Lane office was formally launched by President Michael D. Higgins who praised the community for using their “creative capital” to “make a response in difficult times”. By 2016, the Fumbally Exchange had a sister office, MEME Exchange, in Ravenna, Italy.

In 2018 there were more than 100 people working at the Dame Lane offices when the building was sold by its owner Eir. The community refurbished and moved to Argus House, a former shopfitters' workshop on Blackpitts in Dublin's Liberties later that year where it continues to curate shared space, hosting events, exhibitions, broadcasts and evolving collaborative programmes for creative practitioners. Notable members and past members of the community include Tramp Press, Ellen Dunne, Raidió Rí-Rá and Conor Horgan.

== Activities ==
Fumbally Exchange has hosted regular exhibitions and talks since it first opened in Fumbally Lane. From 2013, it operated a pop-up shop at its Dame Lane location which featured exhibitions, design showcases, and other events. Artists who have exhibited there include Ciaran McCoy (aka PIGSY) and Conor Horgan. It hosted the Institute of Designers in Ireland annual awards ceremony in 2016 and the Architectural Association of Ireland's awards ceremony in 2018.

Since 2025, the Irish language radio station Raidió Rí-Rá has broadcast from a studio at the Exchange facility in Blackpitts. In 2026 Fumbally Exchange launched, FEXA - Fumbally Contemporary, an exhibition featuring work from six visual artists and incorporating literary work by Patrick Chapman.
