= TOG (hackerspace) =

Hackerspace in Dublin, Ireland

Coordinates: 53.33013°N 6.34605°W

- Formation: 2009; 17 years ago
- Location: Ireland
- Origin: Dublin
- Website: www.tog.ie

TOG is a hackerspace in Dublin, Ireland. tóg is a word in the Irish language; one of its meanings is 'to build or construct'.

== History ==
The project was started in January 2009 and the space opened in May 2009. In June 2010, TOG moved to a new, larger building on Chancery Lane (Unit 3), Dublin 8. In January 2015 it was confirmed that the lease on this building would not be extended beyond April 2015, and TOG announced its intention to move to a new premises in Dublin city centre. In the event the lease was extended through October and TOG moved to its new premises, the ground floor of 22 Blackpitts, in mid-October 2015.

== Events ==
TOG has group nights on Mondays with Electronics and Micro-controllers, and Wednesdays with Coding where the space is available for people to work on their projects and also get help with any problems that may be having from 7PM weekly, and semi-regular Craft nights.

Members of TOG have also spoken (or plan to speak) at technology related conferences around Ireland, such as

- OSSBarcamp, September 2009
- PyCon Ireland (the Python Ireland annual conference)
- Ubuntu Ireland and Skynet talks
- TechWeek at DCU

TOG has also hosted events for Engineers Week and Science Week.

TOG, in association with the Irish Robotics Club, hosted an electronics workshop with Mitch Altman from San Francisco's hackerspace Noisebridge, and Jimmie P. Rodgers, in the Science Gallery, Dublin.

TOG has also held events as part of the Innovation Dublin Festival.

TOG has also taken part in Dublin Art and Technology Association's (DATA) 'DATA EVENT 37.0' at the Irish Museum of Contemporary Art (IMOCA).

TOG has also participated in the annual Dublin Maker event, which attracts over 10,000 attendees.

Members of TOG have also taken part in several 'Synchronous Hackathons', live simultaneous hacking events with other hackerspaces.

TOG also took part in the Global Hackerspace Cupcake Challenge, where participating hackerspaces send a cupcake to each other. The TOG cupcake was sent to Artifactory in Perth, Australia. TOG received a cupcake from Alpha One Labs in New York, USA.
