= Ibrahim Noonan =

Irish Imam

Imam Ibrahim Noonan is an Irish Imam to the Ahmadiyya Muslim community. Noonan is Imam of the Ahmadiyya Muslim Association Ireland and is based in Galway at the Galway Mosque.

Born in County Waterford, and raised as a Catholic, Noonan converted to Islam while living in London, he converted to Islam after reading Murder in the Name of Allah, by Mirza Tahir Ahmad. He has studied in Pakistan, and the Jamia Ahmadiyya UK Institute of Theology, and at the Dominican The Priory Institute in Tallaght, qualifying with a degree in Theology and Philosophy. He also studied at Trinity College, Dublin, for an Intercultural Theology and interreligious studies Mphil, and is currently pursuing a PhD.
