= Galway Mosque =

Mosque in Galway, Connacht, Ireland

- مسجد مریم
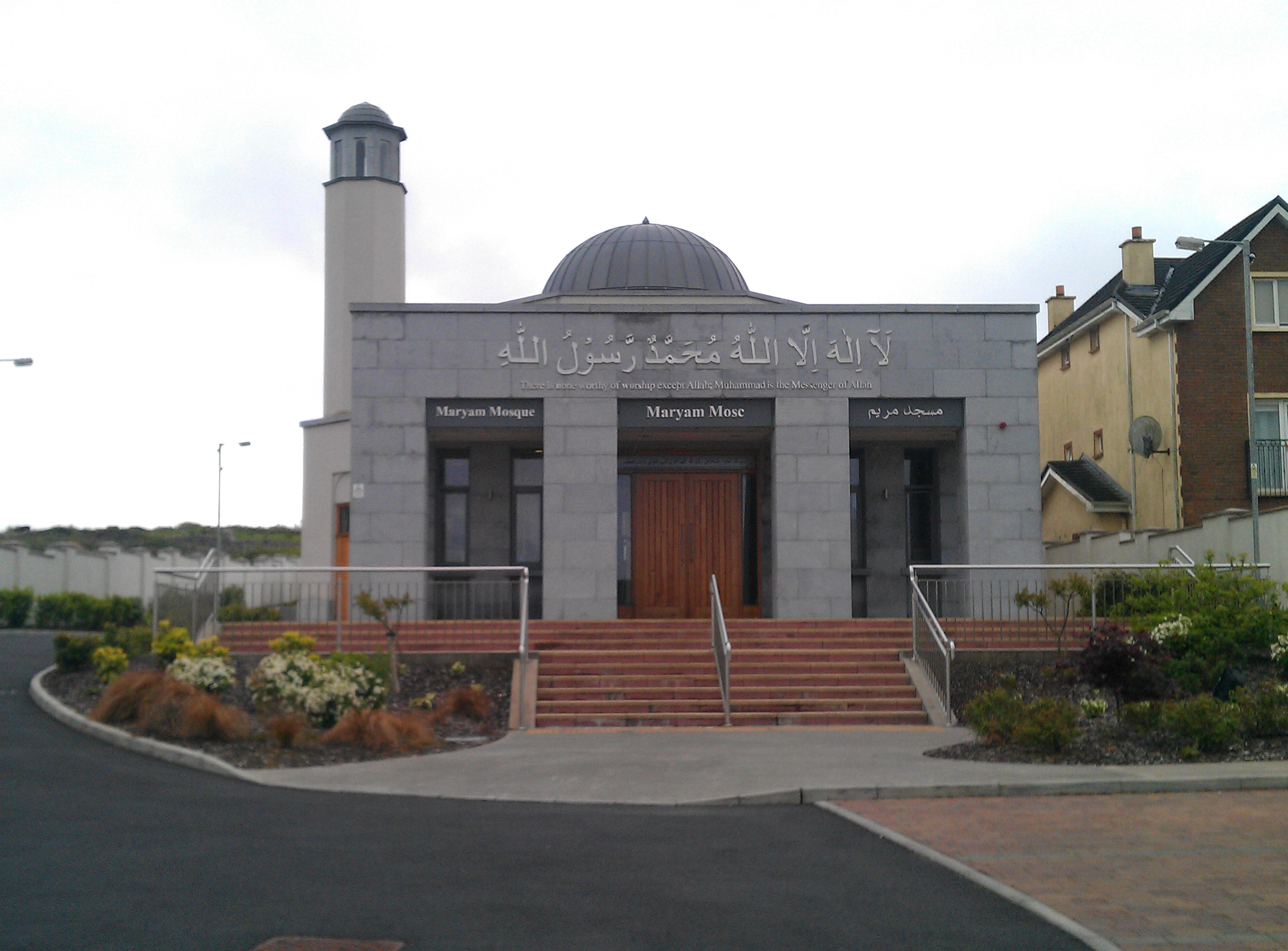

- Location within Ireland

Religion
- Affiliation: Islam
- Branch/tradition: Ahmadiyya

Location
- Location: Galway, Connacht, Ireland
- Interactive map of Galway Mosque
- Coordinates: 53°17′26″N 8°59′40″W

Architecture
- Architect: Michael Badu
- Type: mosque
- Style: Irish Modern
- Completed: 2014
- Construction cost: €1.5 million

Specifications
- Capacity: 300 worshipers
- Dome: 1
- Minaret: 1

Website
- galway-mosque.ie

Maryam Mosque, or the Mary Mosque (Irish: Mosc Mhuire), also known as the Galway Mosque (Irish: Mosc na Gaillimhe), is an Ahmadi Muslim mosque, named in honour of Mary, mother of Jesus. The mosque is located in Galway, Connacht, Ireland. Opened in 2014 by Mirza Masroor Ahmad, the fifth caliph, it is the first purpose-built mosque in County Galway. The Irish born convert to Islam Imam Ibrahim Noonan is based in Galway.

In July 2019 the mosque was vandalised, with windows and locks broken, and equipment stolen.

== See also ==
- Islam in the Republic of Ireland
