= Umar Al-Qadri =

Pakistani Irish Muslim scholar

Muhammad Umar al-Qadri محمد عمر القادری
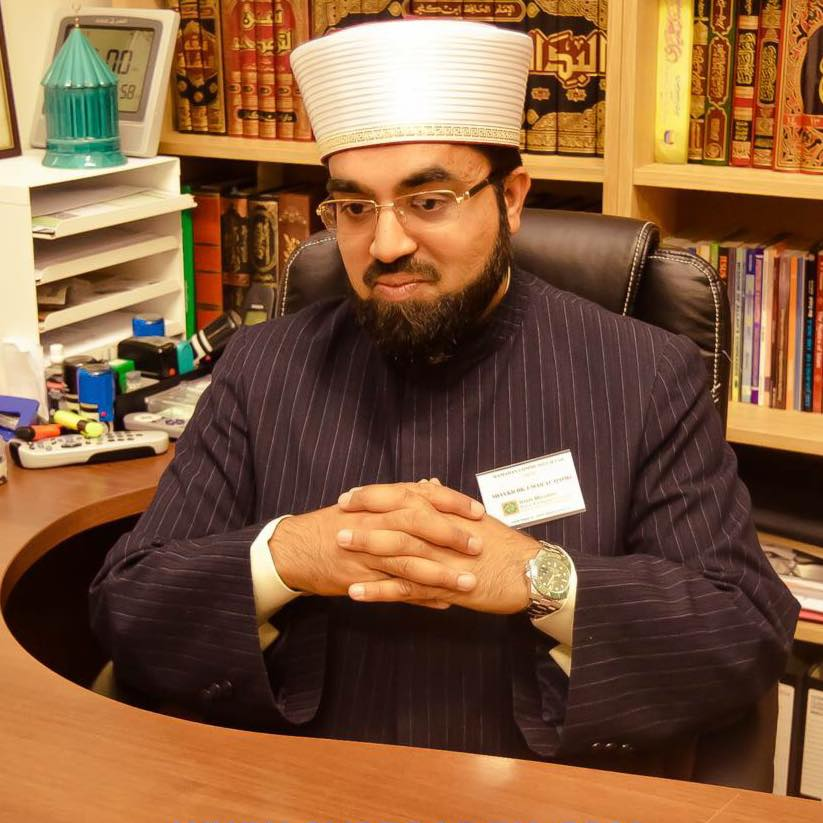
- Shaykh Umar al-Qadri

Founder Al-Mustafa Islamic Cultural Centre Ireland Chair Irish Muslim Peace & Integration Council

Personal details
- Children: 3
- Education: Minhaj University
- Occupation: Imam, Scholar, Lecturer
- Website: umaralqadri.ie

Muhammad Umar Al-Qadri is a Sunni Islamic scholar and sheikh based in Ireland who was born to a Pakistani Muslim scholarly family. His father is Sunni Muslim scholar Mehr Ali Qadri, who arrived in the late 1970s in The Hague, Netherlands, to serve as an Imam. Al-Qadri is also the Chair of the Irish Muslim Peace & Integration Council, a national representative Muslim body with a presence in Dublin, Cork, Athlone, Portlaoise and Belfast. He unsuccessfully contested the 2024 European Parliament election for the Dublin constituency and for the Dublin West constituency in the 2024 Irish general election.

== Early life ==
Al-Qadri was born in Pakistan. He moved to the Netherlands at a young age, where his Sunni Muslim scholar father, Mehr Ali Qadri, had settled in the 1970s to serve as an imam in The Hague. After completing his secondary education in the Netherlands, he completed his Masters (Shahadah Al-Alamiyyah) in Islamic Sciences at Jamia Islamia Minhaj-ul-Quran in Pakistan.

== Life in Ireland ==
Al-Qadri moved to Ireland in 2004, and started working full time as an imam. He founded the Clonee Mosque in a residential estate and in 2008 founded the Al-Mustafa Islamic Cultural Centre Ireland in Dublin.

Al-Qadri is a representative of the Muslim community of Ireland in various governmental and non-governmental bodies and organisations, including the Fingal Ethnic Network, Fingal County Council, Blanchardstown Citizens Information Centre, and the TCD Scriptural Reasoning Group. He was appointed in June 2013 as the secretary of the Fingal Ethnic Network, and he served until 2014, and he has served on the board of the national New Communities Partnership. He was a founding member of the Council of Irish Imams, but resigned from it in 2016, citing a lack of confidence in it and stating it was "ineffective as a platform to discuss the concerns of the Muslim Community in Ireland."

Al-Qadri writes occasionally on Islam related affairs in Irish newspapers, particularly the Irish Times.

Al-Qadri reported having been seriously assaulted in Tallaght, Dublin in February 2024.

== Views ==
=== Abortion ===
In 2018 he called for Irish Muslims to support the "Yes" vote in the referendum to repeal the 8th amendment to the Irish constitution, allowing for the legalisation of abortion. This resulted in criticism from other Islamic scholars in Ireland and also from members of the Roman Catholic hierarchy and establishment.

=== Anti-radicalisation and anti-extremism efforts ===
Al-Qadri has spoken against extremism among Muslims and believes that it is his responsibility as a Muslim to contribute to a peaceful society and to fight against extremism. He has launched an anti-radicalisation website, www.jihad.info, to promote the true concept of Jihad and to stop Muslim youth from radicalising. The launch took place in the Waterford Institute of Technology on Thursday 22 January 2015, where Al-Qadri delivered a talk on Islam, Jihad, and Terrorism.

Al-Qadri is a traditionalist and considers the views of extremists like al-Qaeda as religiously illegitimate and inauthentic. He decries the failure of extremists to adhere to the classical canons of Islamic law and theology and denounces their fatwas. He unequivocally rejects suicide bombing and considers the killing of noncombatants as always forbidden. According to Al-Qadri, members of ISIS, Al-Qaeda, Al-Shabaab and Boku Haram are un-Islamic, unqualified vigilantes who violate basic Islamic teachings.

In June 2015 he organised a protest against ISIS in Dublin City Centre where he launched "Guidelines to Prevent Radicalisation among Irish Muslims".

=== Female genital mutilation ===
In February 2018, following remarks by Muslim scholar Ali Selim supporting the practice of female genital mutilation, Al-Qadri issued a fatwa against female circumcision, saying that it is forbidden and sinful in Islam, and that any Muslims aware of it taking place in Ireland should stop it and report it to the authorities. Minister for Health, Simon Harris, welcomed the statement, tweeting "I welcome this strong statement this evening from the Islamic Centre of Ireland which makes it clear that FGM has no place in any society, it is wrong in all situations and is harmful and a violation and condemns it and rejects the appalling comments of Mr Selim #EndFGM"

=== Integration ===
Al-Qadri promotes integration of Muslims in Ireland and has spoken on many public platforms stressing the importance of integration. He believes interfaith dialogue between Muslims and other religions will “build bridges and demolish walls that separate” the religious groups.

=== Interfaith relations ===
Al-Qadri promotes interfaith and intra-faith relations. As a Sunni Muslim scholar himself, he has attended many Shia Muslim gatherings and events as main guest. In the Islamic Centre that he has founded, he has also invited the national Shia leader of Ireland, Shaykh Dr. Ali Saleh. He wrote the preface to "A journey together, A Muslim Christian dialogue resource" published by Cois Tine.

Al-Qadri has also condemned the persecution of Christians in Kenya and blamed the ignorance on false interpretations of Islamic texts by the terrorists.

Al-Qadri has pointed out the similarities between Christianity and Islam and told stories of positive interactions Muhammad had with Christians to promote relations between the two religious groups.

=== LGBT views ===
Al-Qadri was criticised by foreign LGBT groups in 2018 for his invitation to members of the LGBT community to an iftar meal at the mosque, an invitation some viewed as "insulting" as he continued to describe homosexuals as "sinful." He claimed the invitation had been welcomed by LGBT groups in Ireland. In 2022, he was criticised by Irish LGBTQ+ groups for comments described as insulting, when he stated "You cannot force me to believe that this lifestyle is right. In my view, according to Islam, this lifestyle, it contradicts the Koran. You like somebody from the same gender? Maybe that's natural, but Islam, it strictly forbids from engaging in physical sexual activity with the same gender. Simple as that." He stated on Twitter: "I did say that sex between men is prohibited in Islam. And so is drinking alcohol, eating pork or sex outside marriage. Can we not just agree to have diversity in identity, lifestyle and choice but live together peacefully without accusing others as homophobic or Islamophobic?" In March 2023, Al-Qadri wrote on behalf of the Irish Muslim Council that it supported the position of the Catholic Primary Schools Management Association in opposing teaching children about gender identity, saying "The Irish Muslim Council believes every child in primary school should be supported, respected and treated with consideration. We think it is unacceptable to teach children about gender identity under the pretext of teaching them about diversity."

== Appearances in the media ==
Al-Qadri has delivered various Islamic lectures on popular media channels including Ummah Channel, ARY Qtv, Noor TV and Minhaj TV.

Al-Qadri is the only Muslim scholar to be interviewed on The Meaning of Life, an Irish religious television programme, broadcast on RTÉ One. Originally presented by Gay Byrne, each edition involves the veteran broadcaster interviewing a public figure. Al-Qadri has also appeared on TV3 and RTE television and radio channels on many occasions, being interviewed about issues relating to the Muslim community in Ireland.
