= Islamic Foundation of Ireland =

Islamic organisation based in Ireland

- Fondúireacht Ioslamach na hÉireann
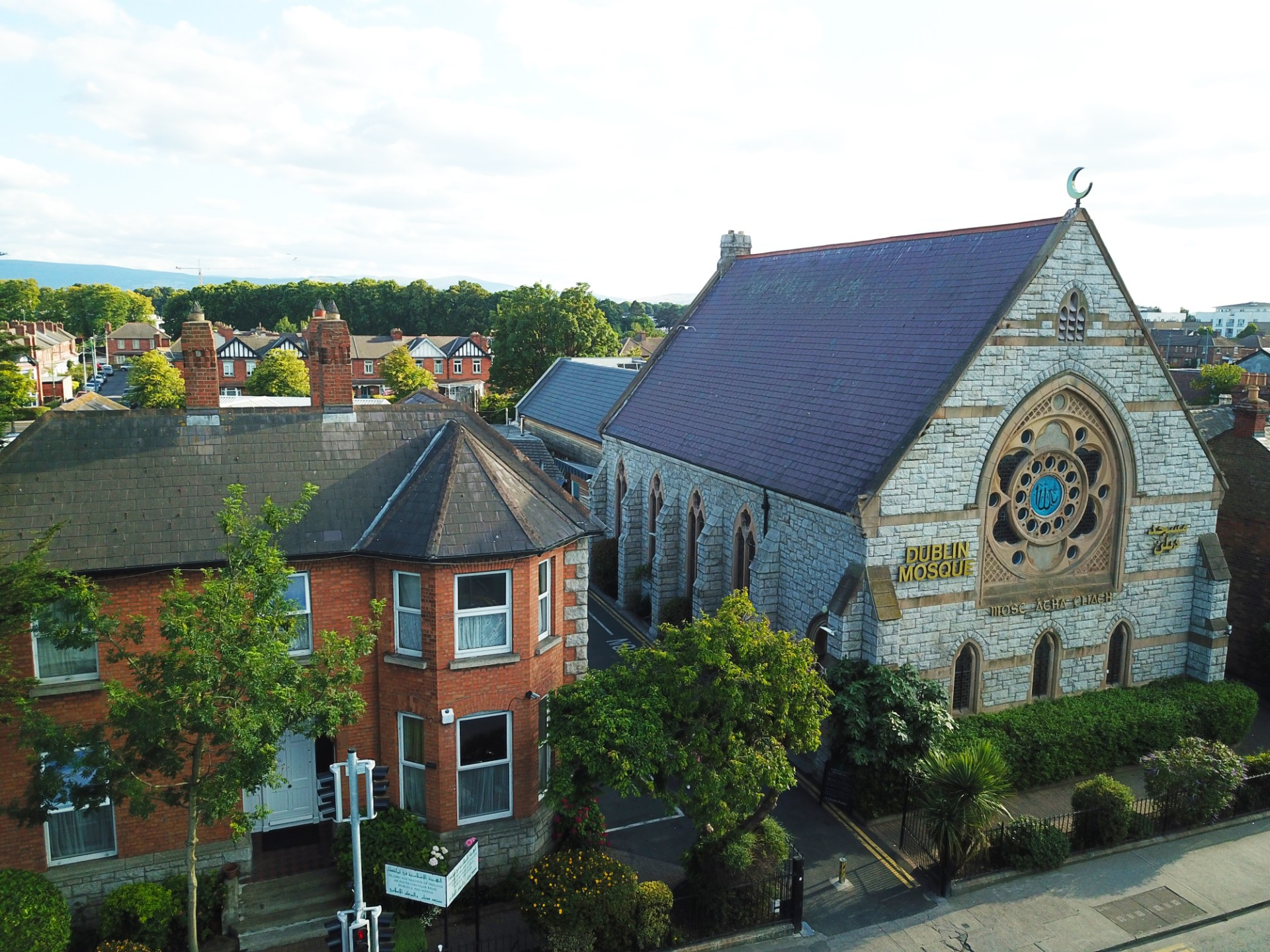
- Dublin Mosque, the headquarters of the Islamic Foundation of Ireland
- Abbreviation: IFI
- Formation: 1959
- Founded at: 7 Harrington Street, Saint Kevin's, Dublin 8
- Type: Muslim - Sunni
- Legal status: Charity Registration Charity number (RCN): 20012809
- Headquarters: Dublin Mosque
- Location: Dublin, Ireland
- Coordinates: 53°19′53″N 6°16′57″W
- Members: 2074
- Official language: English and Arabic
- Imam: Imam Yahya Al-Hussein (1983 - present)
- Board of directors: Majlis Ashura (Elected Council of Representatives)
- Key people: Fazel Ryklief (Administrator 1984 - 2002, 2015 - present) Mudafar Al-Tawash (Administrator 2007 - 2019) Abdullah Ech Chalh (Head Security 2005 - present) Hanan Amer (Women's Section)
- Affiliations: Amal Women's Association Muslim Association Forum (MUSLAF) Discover Islam
- Staff: Full-time staff: 3 Part-time staff: 5
- Volunteers: 25
- Website: islamicfoundation.ie
- Formerly called: Dublin Islamic Society (1959 - 1983)

The Islamic Foundation of Ireland (IFI; Irish: Fondúireacht Ioslamach na hÉireann) was formed in 1959 by Muslim students in Ireland. The society established the first mosque in Ireland in 1976. It also helped to establish mosques in other cities in the country. The headquarters of the foundation is currently at the Dublin Mosque and Islamic Centre, 163 South Circular Road, Dublin 8. The Islamic Foundation of Ireland has been the official representative of Muslims in Ireland since its inception. It describes its role as looking after the religious, educational and social needs of Muslims in Ireland.

== Primary school education ==
In September 1990, the first Muslim National School opened on a South Circular Road campus. It moved in 1993 to Clonskeagh. The school gained recognition from the Department of Education and acquired state funding, and in 2001 a second Muslim National school was established in north Dublin. Both are under the patronage of the Islamic Foundation of Ireland.

== See also ==
- Islam in the Republic of Ireland
