= Richard Cranfield =

Irish sculptor

- Born: 1731; Dublin, Ireland
- Died: 21 January 1809 (aged 77–78)
- Resting place: St Andrew's Church
- Education: Dublin Society Drawing Schools
- Known for: Founding the Society of Artists in Ireland
- Notable work: RDS President's Chair
- Spouse: Elizabeth Brien
- Family: John Smith Cranfield (son); Thomas Cooley (grandson)

Richard Cranfield (1731 – 21 January 1809) was an Irish carpenter, wood carver, gilder, and sculptor most notable for his works in the rococo style.

== Life ==
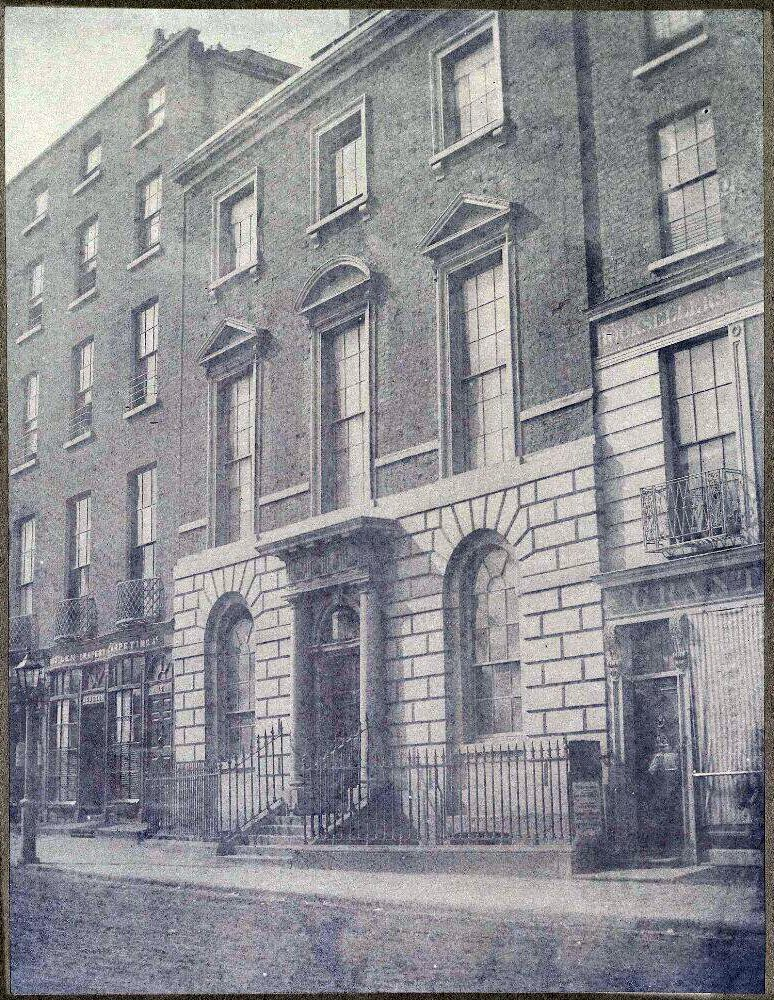
Navigation House, Grafton Street in which Cranfield carried out carving and also made the President's chair in 1767.

Richard Cranfield was born in 1731. He is thought to be the son or nephew of the "joiner and gilder", Richard Cranfield, of Abbey Street who died in October 1750. Cranfield was educated at Dublin Society Drawing Schools on Grafton Street, and was awarded a premium of £6 by the Society in 1756 for a sculpture.

He was a founding member of the Society of Artists in Ireland and exhibited the "Emblematical Group of Hibernia", a wood carving, with them at George's Lane in 1765, a piece commissioned for the Hibernian Silk Warehouse which opened in February 1765. He also exhibited "Elijah taken up into Heaven", bas-relief in wood, at the same exhibition. In 1757 he exhibited "Group of Boys representing Painting, Sculpture, and Architecture", and going on to exhibit in 1767, 1768 and 1769. He was elected master of the Guild of Carpenters (one of the Guilds of the City of Dublin) in 1766, and in 1767 was chosen to represent the group at the City Council.

He was commissioned to create carvings and gildings for the Provost's House, Trinity College Dublin, and woodwork for the Blue Coat School, both in 1771. Cranfield worked with fellow sculptor, Simon Vierpyl, on many houses around Dublin. In 1769, he carved the Dublin Society's presidential ceremonial chair with James Robinson. In 1768, Cranfield carried out work on the drawing room of Castletown House in County Kildare.

Cranfield served as Treasurer of the Society of Artists in Ireland, taking over their Exhibition House in William Street when "its affairs became embarrassed".

He lived in Hog Hill (1765-68), moving to 3 Church Lane off College Green (1759-98), and from 1783 also worked from Church Lane with his son, John Smith Cranfield. Cranfield owned property in Sandymount and Irishtown, moving to Tritonville Lodge, Sandymount when he retired in 1797.

He founded "Cranfield's Baths" in Irishtown which were later trading as Tritonville baths by 1806 and giving Tritonville Road its name.

He died on 21 January 1809 and was buried at St Andrew's Church.

Cranfield married Elizabeth Brien (died 1805) in 1748. Their daughter, Emily, married William Cooley, son of the architect, Thomas Cooley. Emily's son was the artist, also called Thomas Cooley. Cranfield's son, Thomas, graduated from Trinity College in 1792, and served as a curate and rector at Templeseskin, County Wexford for 55 years, and author of Harmony of the Gospels.

Cranfield Place in Sandymount, near his home Tritonville Lodge, is named for him. Examples of his work are held in National Museum of Ireland.
