= John Smith Cranfield =

Irish carver

- Born: 1759; Dublin, Ireland
- Died: April 1802 (aged 43–44)
- Family: Richard Cranfield (father); Thomas Cooley (nephew)

John Smith Cranfield (1759 - 1802) was an Irish carver and sculptor.

== Life ==
John Smith Cranfield, sometimes spelt John Smyth Cranfield, was born in Dublin in 1759. He was the son of Richard Cranfield, a carver and sculpture. He was named after a friend of his father, the architect John Smyth. Cranfield exhibited "Model of a Foot, his first attempt" at the Society of Artists in William Street in 1769, when he was 11 years old.

He was awarded a premium of £6 6d from the Dublin Society in 1772 for a carving in wood, and £9 2s in 1773 for a bas-relief in marble entitled "Charity". Cranfield continued to exhibit, primarily wood carvings, until 1780. From 8 October 1779, Cranfield attended the Royal Academy Schools until around 1783. He studied alongside William Blake and John William Edy. A 1789 portrait of the George Nugent-Temple-Grenville, 1st Marquess of Buckingham by Solomon Williams, now held in the Mansion House, Dublin, is hung in a frame carved by Cranfield. He worked with his father from 1783.

He worked from 109 Capel Street, but later moved to near Ballybough Bridge, taking on some lime-kilns as he did not have the same success with carving that his father did. In 1782, he moved to North Strand. In April 1802, he "died from the effects of a wetting while attending to his kiln". He married Elizabeth Darley in 1789, the daughter of the Builder and stonecutter, George Darley. Elizabeth died in 1836. In the 1830s, there was a partnership between the Darley and Cranfield families as civil engineers.
