= Suffolk Street, Dublin =

Street in Dublin, Ireland

Suffolk Street
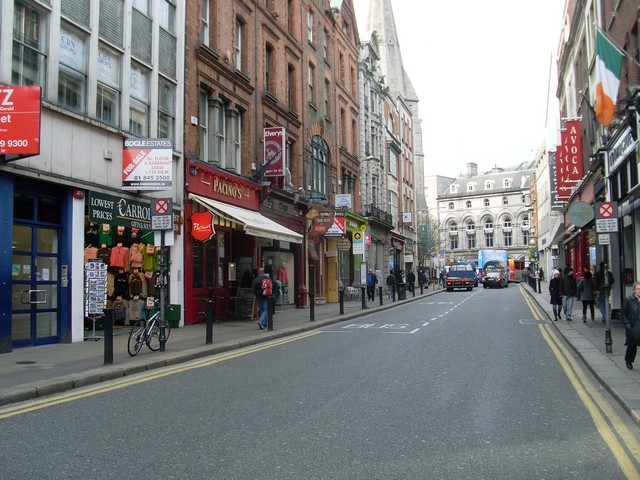
- Suffolk Street looking west towards St Andrew's Street, in 2009
- Interactive map of Suffolk Street
- Native name: Sráid Suffolk (Irish)
- Namesake: Thomas Howard, 1st Earl of Suffolk
- Location: Dublin, Ireland
- Postal code: D02
- Coordinates: 53°20′38″N 6°15′39″W
- east end: Grafton Street
- Major junctions: Church Lane
- west end: St Andrew's Street

Suffolk Street (Irish: Sráid Suffolk) is a pedestrianised street in central Dublin which connects with Grafton Street at the east and St Andrew's Street and Church Lane to the west.

== History ==
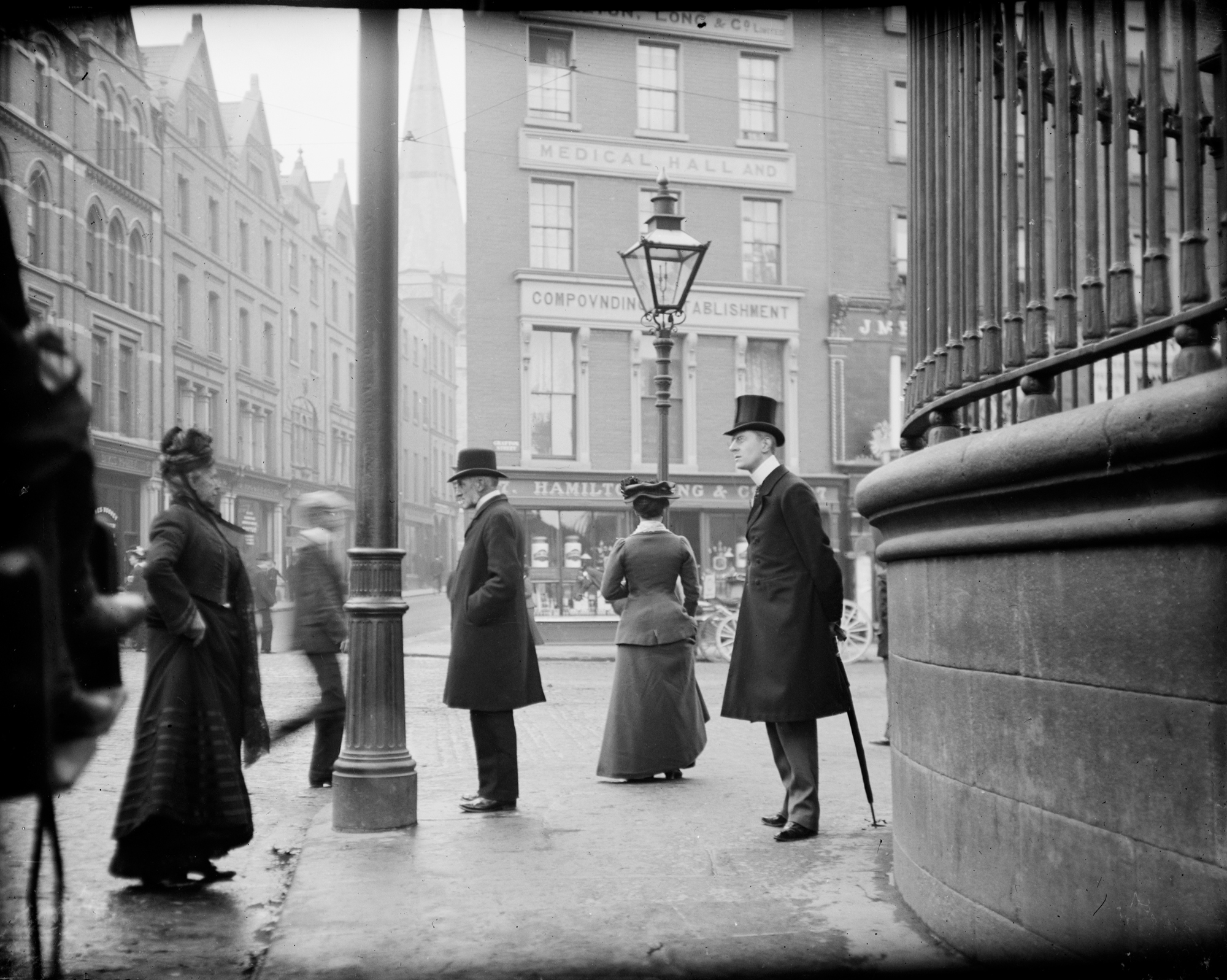
The junction of Nassau Street, Grafton Street and Suffolk Street, looking towards Suffolk Street, around the turn of the 20th century.

During the Viking period, Suffolk Street was the site of an assembly mound known as Thingmote, which survived until the earth was removed to raise Nassau Street in 1685 to prevent flooding and to create the new thoroughfare. The Thingmote was said to be located near the former Ulster Bank building at the junction with Church Lane, and extended down towards College Green. The adjoining street, St Andrew's Street, was known as Hog Hill due to the Nunnery of St Mary de Hogges which partly stood on present-day Suffolk Street.

The street was named for Thomas Howard, 1st Earl of Suffolk, and first appears on maps as a thoroughfare in Bernard De Gomme's map of 1673 where it is unnamed. It is later named on Charles Brooking's map of Dublin (1728).

A bowling green was located on Suffolk Street for much of the 17th century with it being noted as railed in 1621 and noted again in maps as late as 1682.

The street was home to the Earls of Kildare before the construction of Leinster House.

=== 19th century ===
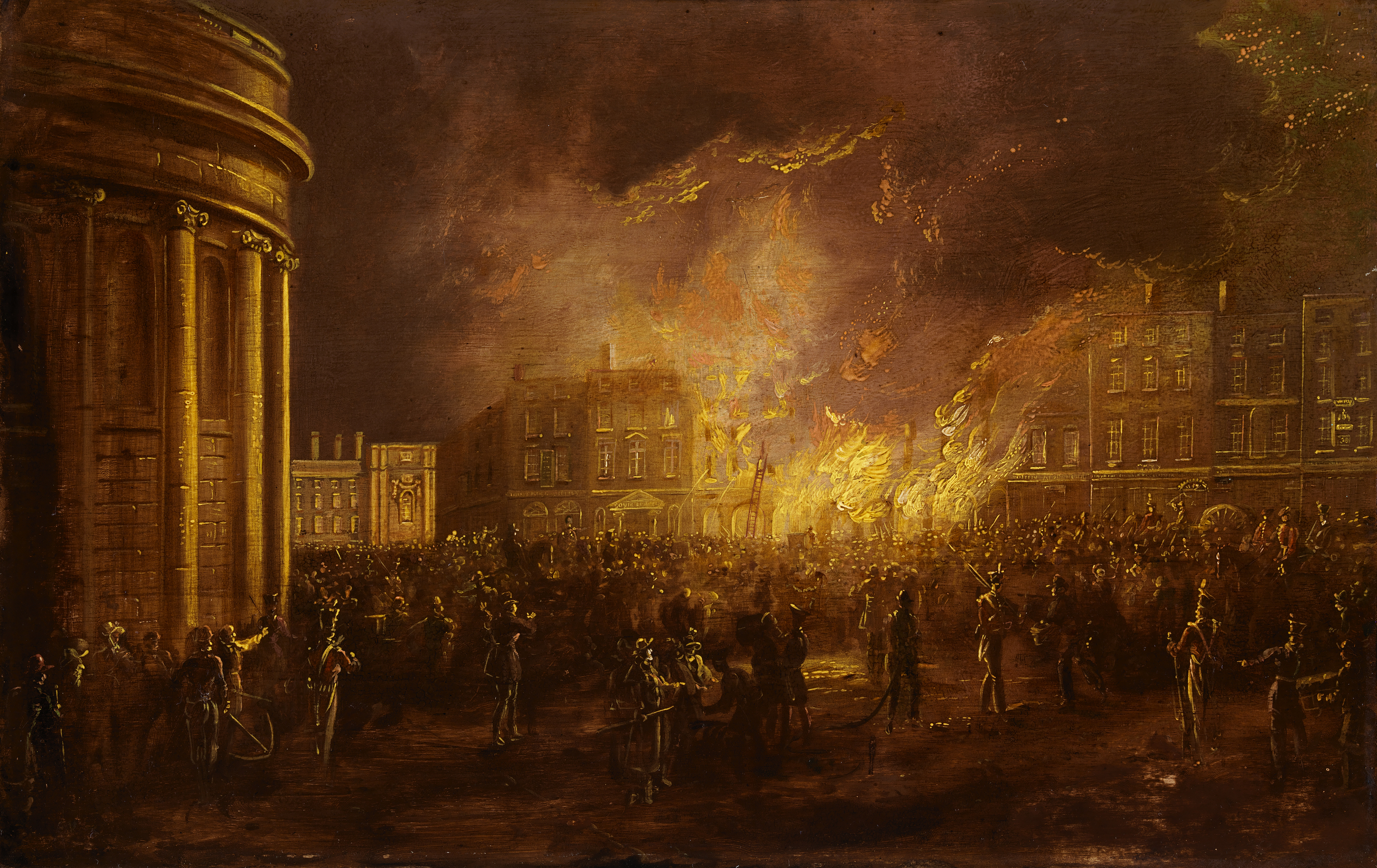
The Burning of the Arcade in College Green, Dublin.

In 1819, a large galleried shopping arcade, the "Royal Arcade" was developed which linked Suffolk Street to College Green on the site of the former General Post Office. It contained numerous shops, a "pocket theatre", card rooms, and a ballroom. The arcade was destroyed by fire in April 1837 in an incident which also resulted in the destruction of the nearby Royal Hotel and four other buildings on Suffolk Street as well as three buildings on College Green.

=== 20th century ===
From 1921 to 1951, number 21 was the premises of the "Statuary Manufacturers" and "Wood Carvers" C. Bull Ltd. A number of buildings along the northern side of the street were demolished in the 1960s and replaced with a Miesian-style infill bank building for National Bank by Robin Walker of Michael Scott and Partners. This was itself demolished in 2005 for retail and office redevelopment.

After the extension of the Luas green line, the Molly Malone statue was relocated from Grafton Street, where it had stood since 1988, to the corner of Suffolk Street and St Andrew's Street, outside St Andrew's Church. This coincided with the pedestrianisation of Suffolk Street, after a trial period in 2019 following the Luas roadworks.

== Notable buildings and businesses ==
- M.J. O'Neill's a pub housed within a series of buildings from the Victorian and Edwardian era.
- AA Ireland, building constructed for the Automobile Association and Motor Union Insurance Company.
- O'Donoghue's Pub, previously called Thingmote.
- Avoca have a large store on the northern side of the street.
- Habitat previously had a store at 6-9 Suffolk Street from 2005-08.
