= Jammet Restaurant =

Defunct French restaurant in Dublin, Ireland

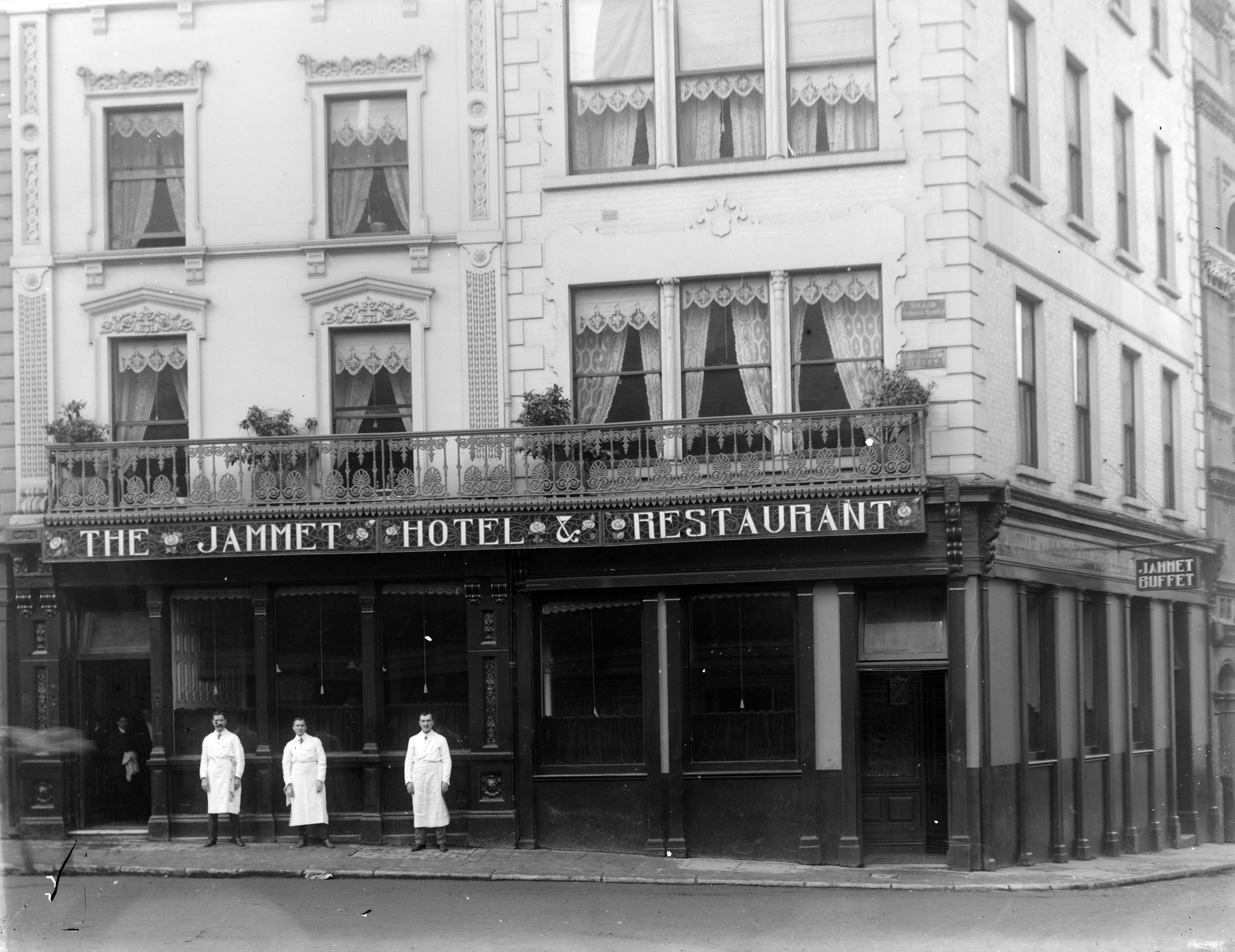
- The St Andrew's Street premises c1900-1925

- Jammet's on a map of Dublin (second location indicated)

Restaurant information
- Established: March 6, 1901
- Closed: 1967
- Previous owner: Jammet family
- Food type: French cuisine, haute cuisine
- Dress code: Formal
- Location: 26–27 St Andrew's Street (1901–26); 46 Nassau Street (1926–67), Dublin, Ireland (Irish Free State, Republic of Ireland)
- Coordinates: 53.343065°N 6.258923°W

Jammet Restaurant, also called Restaurant Jammet (pronounced [ʁɛstɔʁɑ̃ ʒamɛ]) or The Jammet Hotel and Restaurant, was a French restaurant located in Dublin, Ireland between 1901 and 1967.

According to a 1990s Dublin Tourism brochure, the "famous Jammet's Restaurant [..] flourished throughout the first half of this century".

== History ==
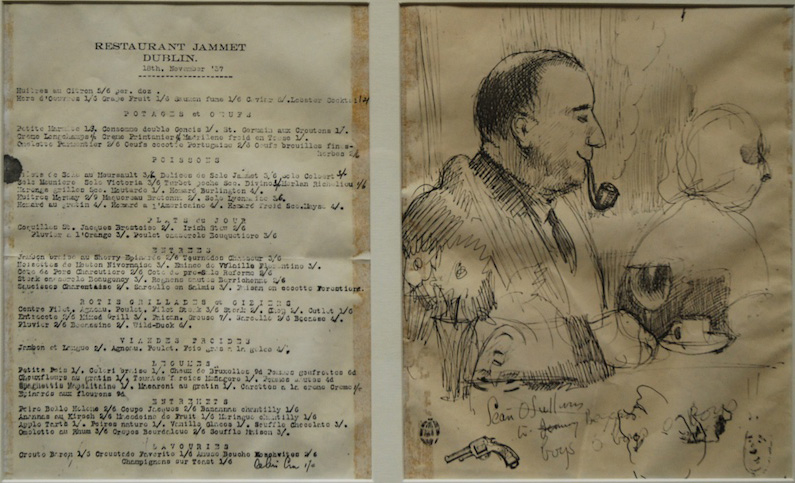
Menu from Jammet’s, 1937

Jammet opened on 6 March 1901 at 26–27 Saint Andrew's Street, opposite St Andrew's Church. It was previously the site of the Burlington restaurant and Oyster Saloons owned by the Corless family.

It was established by Michel Jammet, nine years chef to George Cadogan, 5th Earl Cadogan, and his brother François. For a long time it was the only French restaurant in the city.

It was mentioned in James Joyce's Ulysses: (published 1922, set in 1904): a stream-of-consciousness section mentions "that highclass whore in Jammet’s", while Corny Kelleher later mentions "Two commercials that were standing fizz in Jammet’s" (i.e. two travelling salesman that were buying champagne).

Jammet's moved to 46 Nassau Street in 1926. In 1928, Vogue described Jammet’s as “one of Europe’s best restaurants . . . crowded with gourmets and wits”, where the sole and grouse were “divine”.

Jammet and his wife Yvonne (née Auger) ran the French Benevolent Society during the Second World War, and were staunch supporters of the Free French and Charles de Gaulle.

One of the earliest surviving menus is from 1949; it shows an idea of haute cuisine based on the ideas of Auguste Escoffier.

In 1963 Egon Ronay visited, saying "Space, grace, the charm of small red leather armchairs, fin-de-siècle murals and marble oyster counters exude a bygone age. Ritz and Escoffier would feel at home here."

The restaurant closed in 1967.

== Visitors ==
Virtually every Dublin and visiting celebrity ate at Jammet's at some point. W. B. Yeats, Lennox Robinson, Liam O’Flaherty, Micheál MacLiammóir, Hilton Edwards and Charlie Haughey were regulars. John Lennon, James Cagney, Rita Hayworth, Danny Kaye, Michael Collins, Aly Khan, Orson Welles, and Senator John F. Kennedy and his wife Jackie also ate there.
