= St. Teresa's Carmelite Church =

Catholic church in Dublin, Ireland

Coordinates: 53.3421°N 6.2608°W

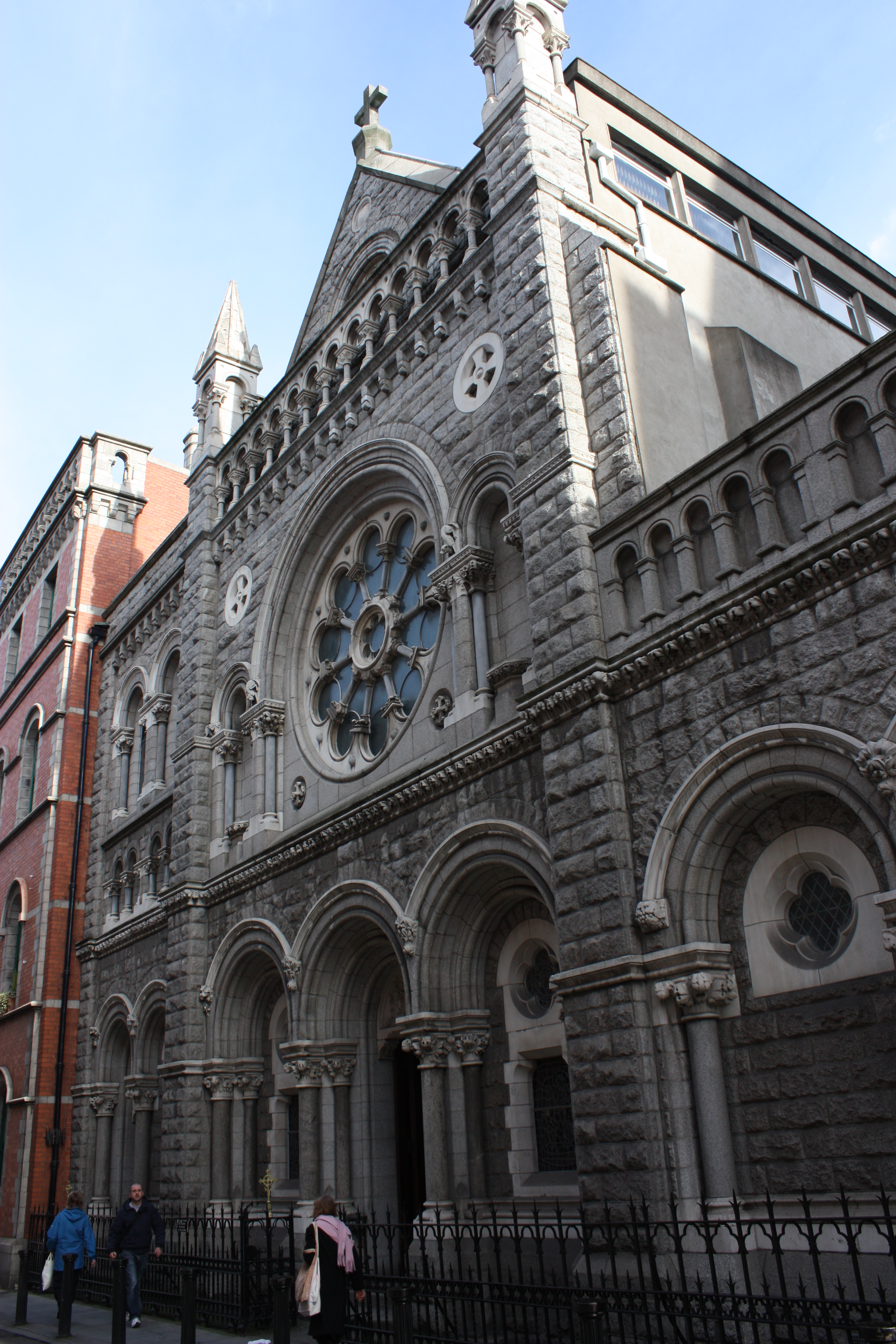
- Clarendon Street facade of St. Teresa's Church
- St. Teresa's Carmelite Church
- Country: Ireland
- Denomination: Roman Catholic
- Religious order: Discalced Carmelite order

History
- Dedication: Teresa of Ávila

Architecture
- Architect(s): Bryan Bolger and Timothy Beahan
- Style: Gothic
- Years built: 1793–1810
- Completed: 1810

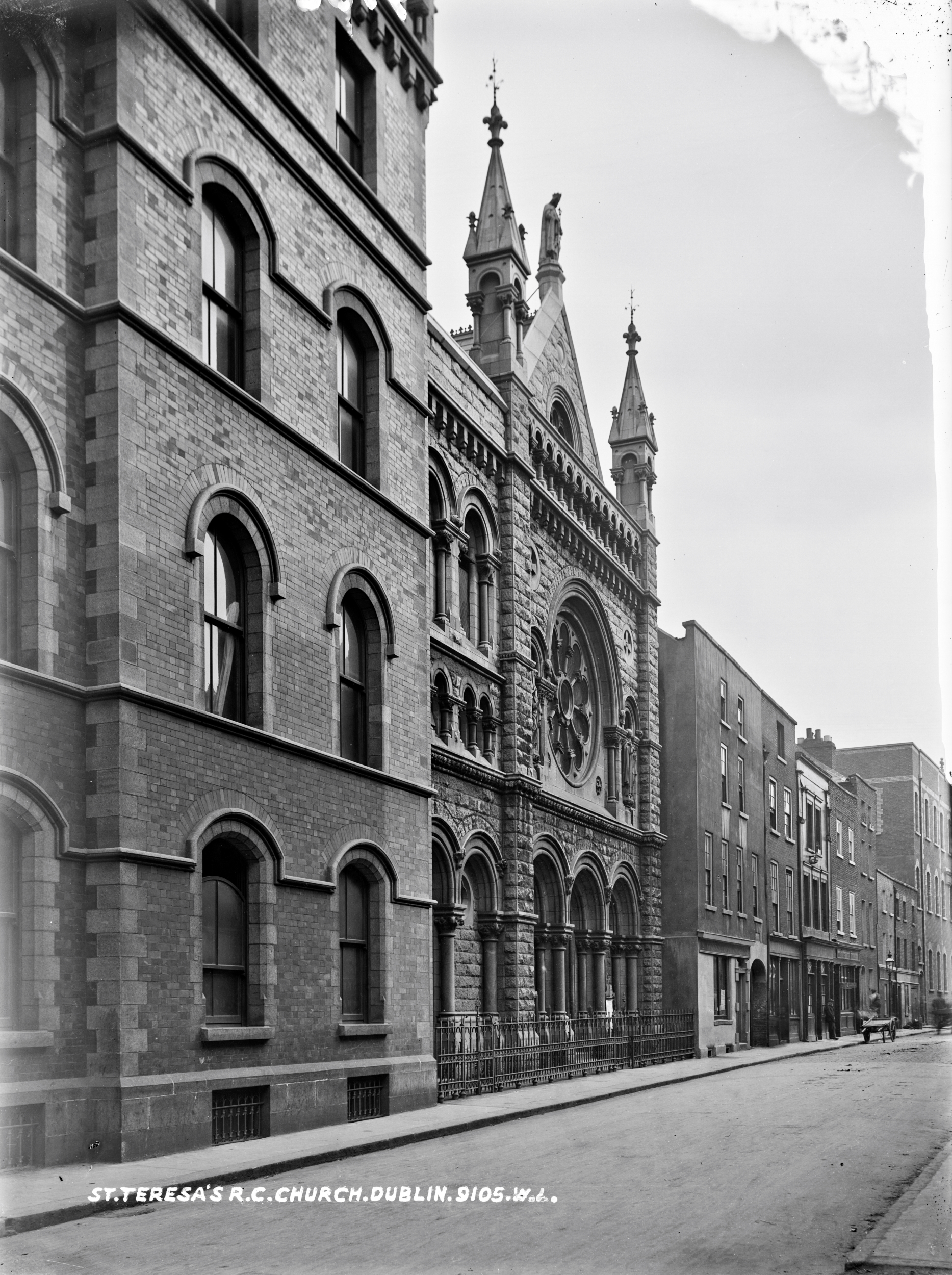
St. Teresa's Carmelite Church, Clarendon Street c. 1910

St. Teresa's Carmelite Church is a Catholic church on Clarendon Street in Dublin, Ireland. Originally accessed via Wicklow Street, there is an additional entrance off Johnson's Court near Grafton Street. First constructed in the late 18th century, the church was expanded and significant interior works were undertaken in the late 19th century. The church is run by friars of the Discalced Carmelite order.

== History ==
The church was originally built between 1793 and 1810 with access via the side lane of Johnson's Court in the manner of Dublin Roman Catholic churches of the era due to the lingering effects of the Penal laws. The design is variously attributed to Bryan Bolger by Edward McParland while a plaque over the north entrance of the church attributes it to Timothy Beahan. It is likely both individuals were involved in its initial design and construction. Christopher Moore is recorded as completing some of the interior stuccowork around 1807.

It is one of the oldest standing post-reformation Catholic churches in Dublin, and is included, together with its priory, in the Record of Protected Structures maintained by Dublin City Council.

The church and priory were extensively redeveloped in the second half of the 19th century with a new front added to Clarendon Street following the passing of the Roman Catholic Relief Act 1829 permitting main street frontage.

Dedicated to Teresa of Ávila, the church is historically associated with the Discalced Carmelite Order. It was built on lands acquired by John Sweetman, a Dublin-based brewer, in the late 18th century. Daniel O'Connell reputedly held meetings in the church in the early nineteenth century.

== Features ==
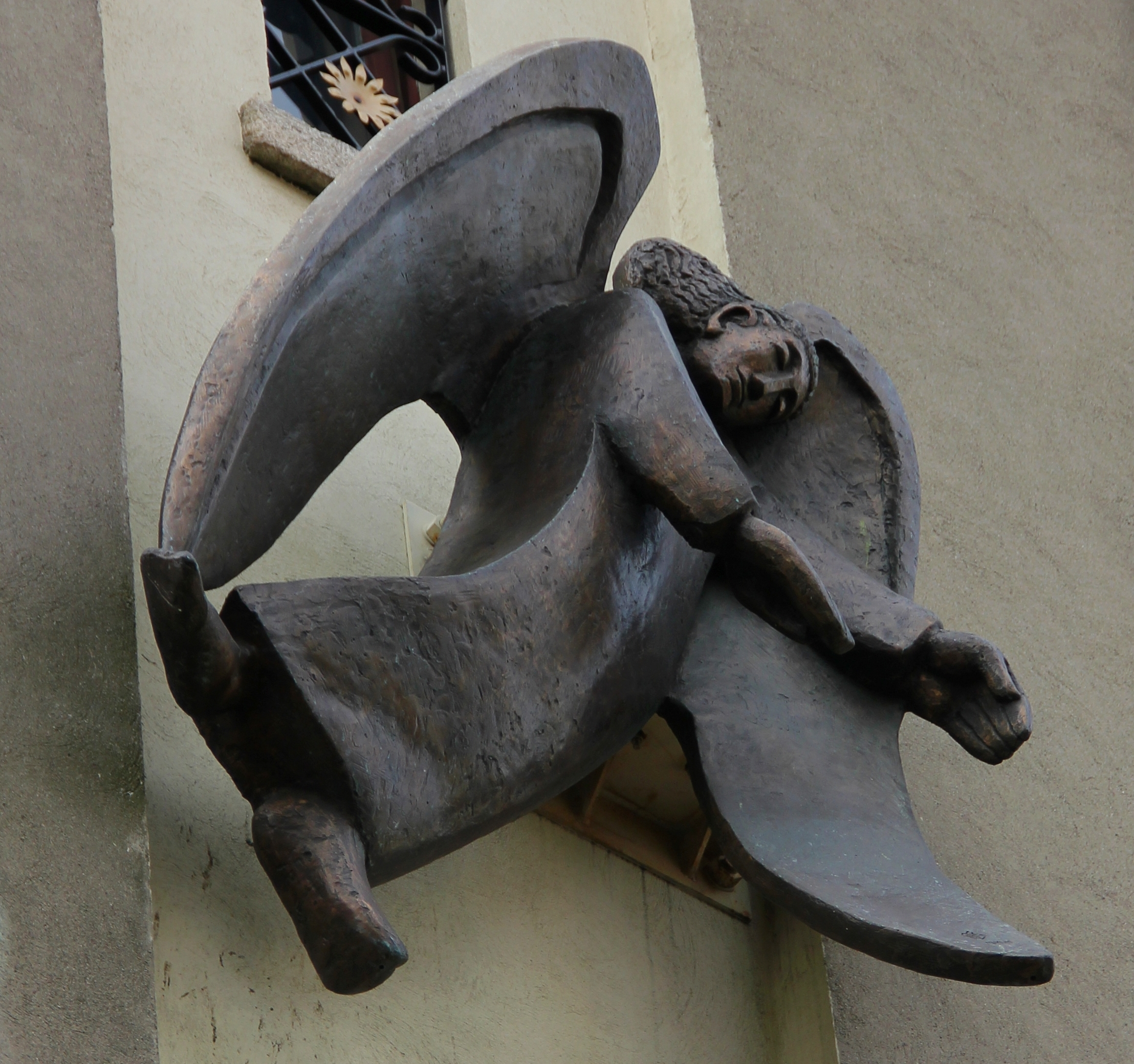
Bronze "Angel of Peace", Imogen Stuart, unveiled in January 2008

Its interior works include an oratory (completed c. 1882) and altar (1891) are attributed to George Ashlin, with additional developments associated with William Hague and William Henry Byrne. A statue of The Dead Christ (1829), by sculptor John Hogan, is beneath the church's high altar.

A bronze sculpture on the exterior of the church's bell tower, the "Angel of Peace" by German-Irish artist Imogen Stuart, was unveiled in January 2008.
