= Clarendon Street, Dublin =

Street in Dublin, Ireland

Clarendon Street
- Clarendon Street looking north from the junction with Coppinger Row
- Interactive map of Clarendon Street
- Native name: Sráid Clarendon (Irish)
- Location: Dublin, Ireland
- Postal code: D02
- Coordinates: 53°20′31″N 6°15′41″W
- north end: Wicklow Street
- Major junctions: Chatham Street, Chatham Row
- south end: Clarendon Row

Clarendon Street (Irish: Sráid Clarendon) is a street in Dublin, Ireland which stretches from Wicklow Street in the North to Chatham Street in the South and runs parallel to Grafton Street.

== History ==
A view from St. Stephen's shopping centre car park (8th floor) looking down Clarendon Street

In medieval times, the area of Clarendon Street formed part of the lands of the Priory of All Hallows, and later was the boundary to playing fields for bowls known as "the whole land of Tibb and Tom".

The street was named Clarendon Street for Henry Hyde, 2nd Earl of Clarendon, Lord Lieutenant of Ireland from at least 1728 when it features in Charles Brooking's map of Dublin.

From 1782, the brewer William Williams built housing along the street.

After the construction of Powerscourt House in 1774, the street became fashionable, with the families of members of the Irish parliament living on the street. On the corner with Coppinger Row, there was a wooden watch house known as "The Charlies", later replaced with a Dublin Metropolitan Police station. The street went into decline after the Act of Union, with dance and gaming establishments taking over the houses. By the 1860s, the street was largely tenements and small businesses.

The Society of St Patrick's Temperance Movement operated from number 50 from 1839, owing to the proximity to brothels and illegal drinking establishments on the street and Wicklow Street. Daniel O'Connell gave lectures from the number 50, and he also attended St. Teresa's Carmelite Church on the street. The subsequent organisation, St Teresa's Total Abstinence and Temperance Association moved to numbers 43-44 from 1896, where performances and classes were held. Many plays were staged in St Teresa's Hall before the establishment of the Abbey Theatre, and was eventually closed in 1936.

A number of the original, early Georgian houses have survived on the street. Some Victorian buildings have also survived on the street following development in the 20th and 21st centuries.
