= John Smyth (architect) =

Irish architect

- Died: 1775
- Occupation: Architect

John Smyth (died 1775) was an Irish Palladian architect, engineer, and designer.

== Life ==
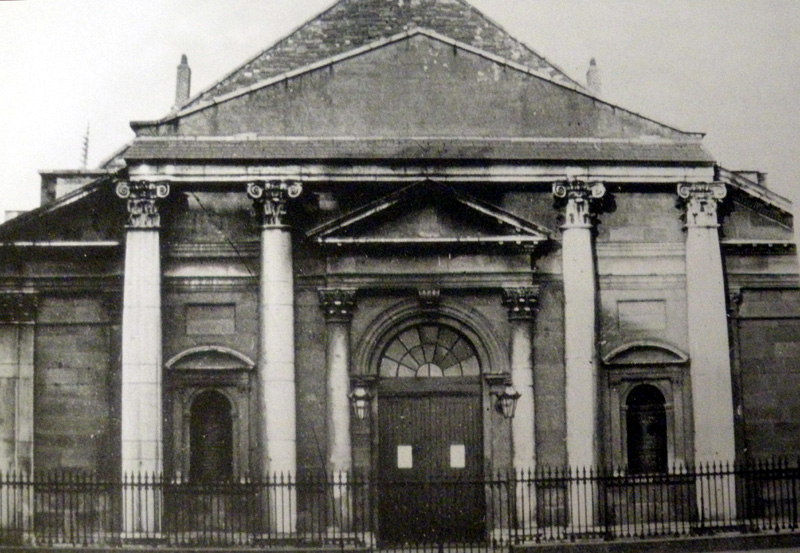
St Thomas's Church circa 1890

Nothing is known of John Smyth's early life until he is recorded as architect of St Thomas's church, Marlborough Street, Dublin in 1758, which is attributed to him by the Dublin Gazette of 23–6 September 1758, and gives his address as Clarendon Street. The facade of St Thomas's was modelled on the Redentore, Venice, and was destroyed in 1922. Noting its destruction, The Irish Builder commented "next, perhaps, to the Four Courts in architectural value amongst the buildings lately destroyed".

The Provost's House, Trinity College Dublin is attributed to him, but this has been questioned, but there is a reference to a payment to "Smith [sic] architect for a plan for the Provost's House" in the bursar's quarterly accounts for the college ending June 1759.

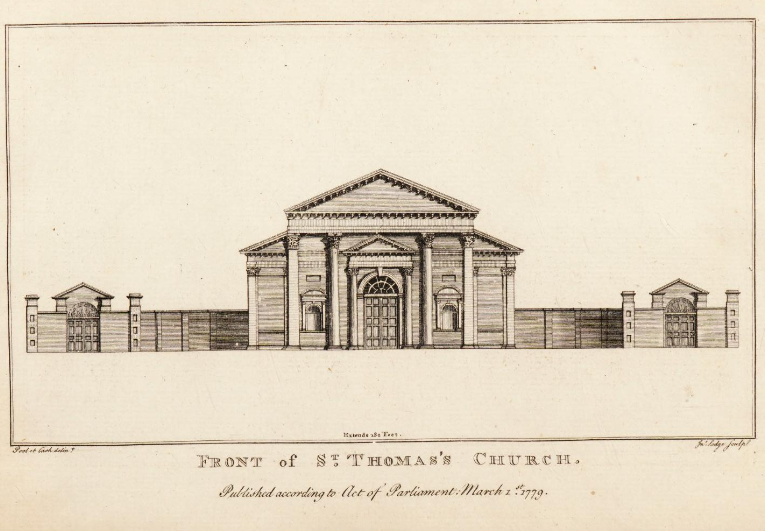
An illustration of St. Thomas's Church in Dublin from 1779 by Robert Poole and John Cash

Smyth is recorded as the "surveyor, director and overseer" of the construction of St Catherine's church, Thomas Street from 1760. Also in 1760, he was awarded the freedom of the corporation of bricklayers and plasterers. In the 1760s, he leased property in Moss Street and George's Lane, and was involved in the rebuilding of Dublin Corporation offices on Ram Alley in 1767. He was an architect to the ballast board for Poolbeg Lighthouse, also in 1767, and he was recognised for this work in 1768 when he was presented with "a piece of plate to the value of twenty guineas" by Dublin Corporation for his work.

In the 1770 Views…in the City of Dublin, Smyth is described as architect of "several other of our public buildings" as well as the three attributed to him: St Catherine's, St Thomas's and St Werburgh's. Along with his work with ballast board, he is considered an engineer due to his consultation on the city's water supply by Dublin Corporation's Pipe Water Committee in 1763. The ballast board continued to employ Smyth until they record his death in 1775. He was also the official architect to the commissioners of revenue, being replaced by Thomas Ivory after his death.

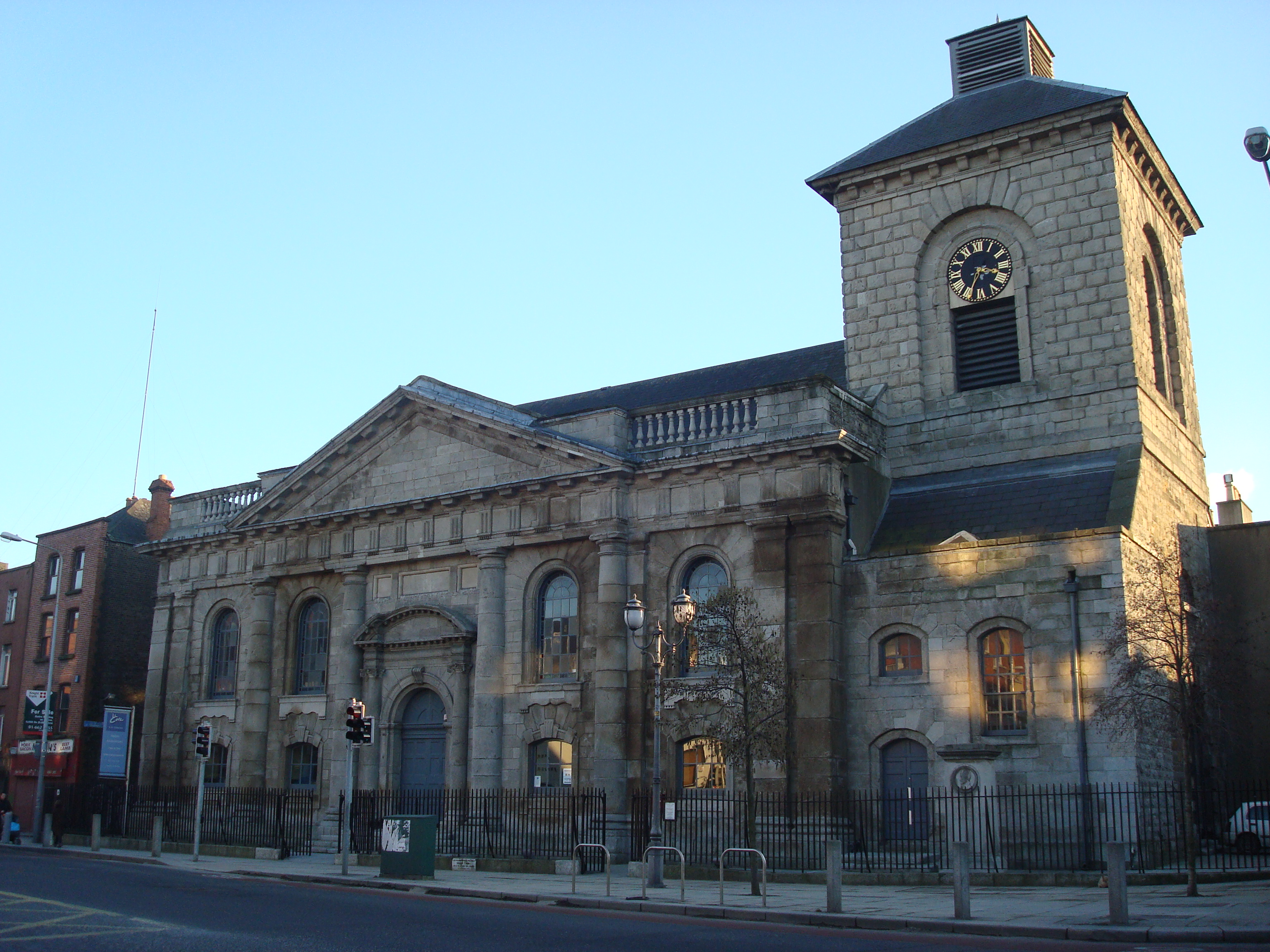
St Catherine's Church, Thomas Street

The final work attributed to Smyth is a memorial to Archbishop Arthur Smyth, St Patrick's Cathedral, Dublin in 1771, with sculpture by John Van Nost. It has been speculated that Smyth was related to the Archbishop, but there is no evidence to prove it.

It is claimed that the carver and gilder, Richard Cranfield, named his son John Smith Cranfield after Smyth.
