= St Andrew's Street, Dublin =

Street in Dublin, Ireland

St Andrew's Street
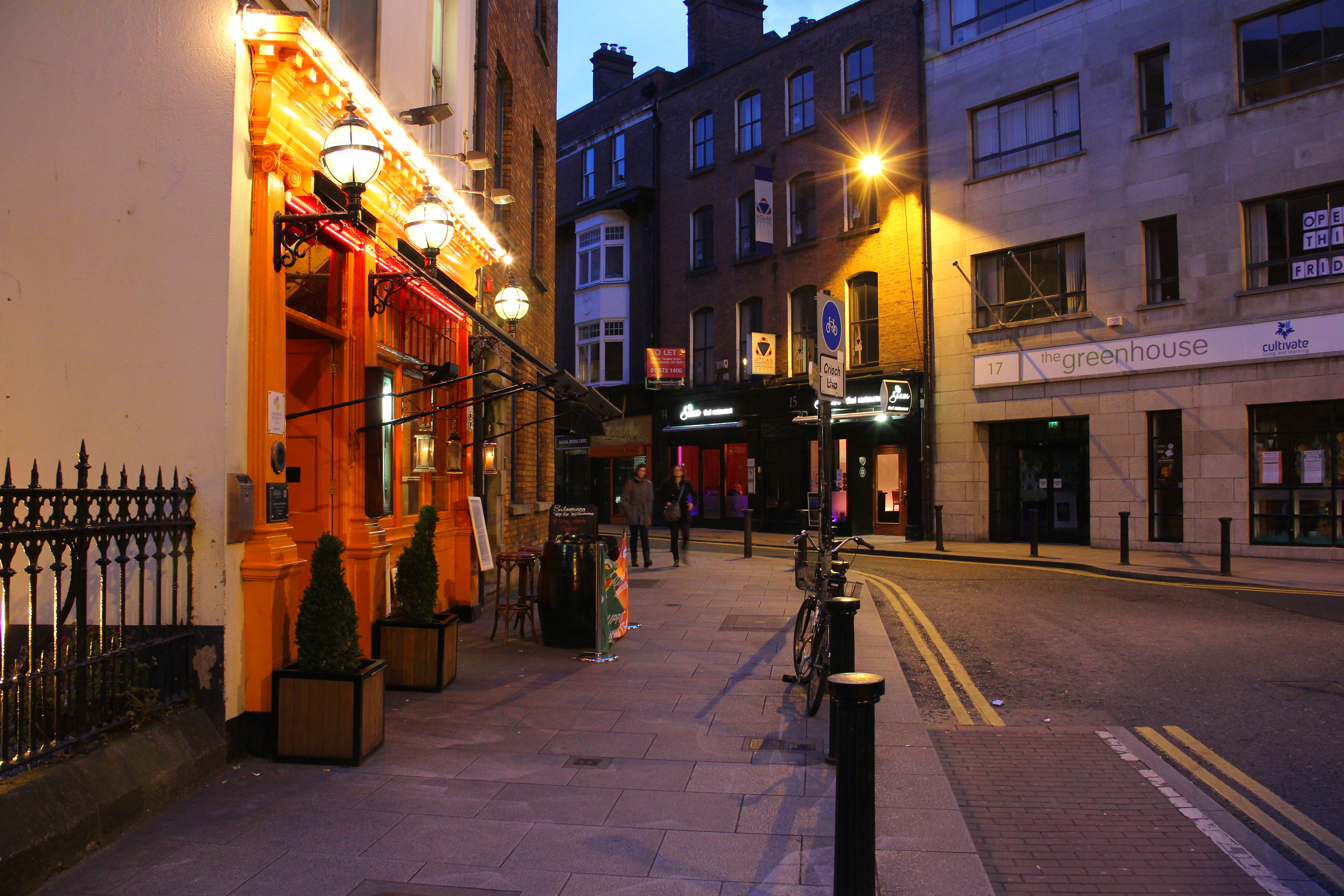

- Location within Central Dublin
- Native name: Sráid San Aindrias (Irish)
- Former name: Hog Hill
- Namesake: St Andrew's Church
- Length: 130 m (430 ft)
- Width: 13 metres (43 ft)
- Location: Dublin, Ireland
- Postal code: D02
- Coordinates: 53.343583°N 6.261650°W
- northeast end: Suffolk Street, Church Lane
- southwest end: Wicklow Street, William Street South, Exchequer Street

Other
- Known for: St Andrew's Church, Restaurant Jammet, Molly Malone statue, restaurants

St Andrew's Street is a retail street on the south side of Dublin, Ireland.

== Location ==
It runs from the junction of Exchequer Street, Wicklow Street and South William Street in the south to Church Lane and Suffolk Street in the north. It is joined on its western side by Trinity Street and bordered on its eastern side by St Andrews Church for which it is named.

== History ==
The street was originally known as Hog Hill, a reference to the Old Norse and Viking word 'Haugr' for a hill, which was corrupted as Hoggen and also gave its name to nearby Hoggen Green. It was also a Viking meeting site and later a place of execution in medieval Dublin.

The street is named after St Andrew's Church, built in 1670 and designed by William Dobson. An ancient church was in the area from 1172 called the Church of St Andrew de Thengmote and may have been preceded by a Viking temple. The western end of the street was named Hog Hill in 1728 until 1776 after Abbey of the Blessed Virgin Mary del Hogges. The current Church of St Andrew was built between 1860 and 1862 and was designed by W. H. Lynn.

The surgeon Philip Woodroffe lived in the street and died at his home there in 1799. He was buried in St Andrew's churchyard. The famous Restaurant Jammet stood on St Andrew's Street between 1901 and 1926.

== See also ==
- Dublin 2
