= Yvonne Jammet =

French landscape painter and sculptor

- Born: Yvonne Auger; 1900; Paris, France
- Died: August 30, 1967 (aged 66–67); Lowell, Massachusetts, United States
- Resting place: Deans Grange Cemetery, Blackrock
- Movement: avant-garde and modernism
- Spouse: Louis Jammet

Yvonne Jammet (1900 – 30 August 1967) was a French landscape painter and sculptor, who spent her career in Ireland. With her husband, Louis Jammet, she ran the well-known Dublin-based French restaurant, Restaurant Jammet.

== Life ==
Yvonne Jammet was born Yvonne Auger in 1900, in Paris. Her parents were Félix Auger and Catherine (née Jammet), who were both restaurateurs. She studied art at the Académie Julian and the Atelier Jean-Paul Laurens. She married her third cousin, Louis Jammet, with whom she moved to Dublin in 1928 to take over running of his father's restaurant on Nassau Street. The couple had two sons and two daughters. Jammet died whilst visiting the United States in Lowell, Massachusetts, on 30 August 1967. She is buried at Deans Grange Cemetery, Blackrock.

== Restaurant Jammet ==
Restaurant Jammet was popular amongst artists, writers, actors, and business owners. Amongst the patrons of the restaurant were Orson Welles, Tyrone Power, Peter Ustinov, W. B. Yeats, Jack Butler Yeats, Harry Kernoff, and Seán O'Sullivan. As an artist, and patron and arts, Jammet decorated the restaurant, most notably the remodelling of the upstairs in 1946 with architect Noel Moffet to a minimalist looks with curved glass-block screens and exposed steelwork. Through his staging of a number of French plays in autumn 1938 at the Gate Theatre, Micheál MacLiammóir became close friends with the Jammets. When Jammet and MacLiammóir visited Paris at the same time, they would attend the theatre together. MacLiammóir described Jammet as "exquisite, dark and smiling, a portrait by Renoir miraculously come to life in the glooms of twentieth-century Dublin."

== Artistic career ==
Jammet was a member of The White Stag group, a modernist avant-garde group. In 1943, she exhibited portraits, still-lives, and landscapes, at Victor Waddington's Gallery, South Anne Street. Waddington held a number of his celebrations at Restaurant Jammet. At one of these occasions in 1950, Jack Butler Yeats was awarded the French Legion of Honour. Jammet exhibited three works in the 1950 Irish Exhibition of Living Art, Saint-Jérôme d'Ax (1947), Quillan (1948) and Ax-les-Thermes. A 1951 exhibition at Waddington's showed Jammet's wood carvings and paintings.

The subject of her work was often religious, such as the carved sanctuary figures of the Sacred Heart and of Our Lady in the Church of Our Lady of the Rosary, Limerick. She carved The twelve tribes for the Jewish synagogue in Terenure, Dublin. After the rebuilding of the Cross to St Michael's church, Dún Laoghaire following a fire, Jammet donated carved stations of the cross. In 1953, her work was featured in an exhibition of contemporary Irish art in the National Library of Wales. She was also exhibited at the contemporary Irish art at An Tostal exhibition, Bray in 1954, and with the Institute of the Sculptors of Ireland in 1956.
