= Provost's House, Trinity College Dublin =

Coordinates: 53°20′36″N 6°15′31″W

Provost's House
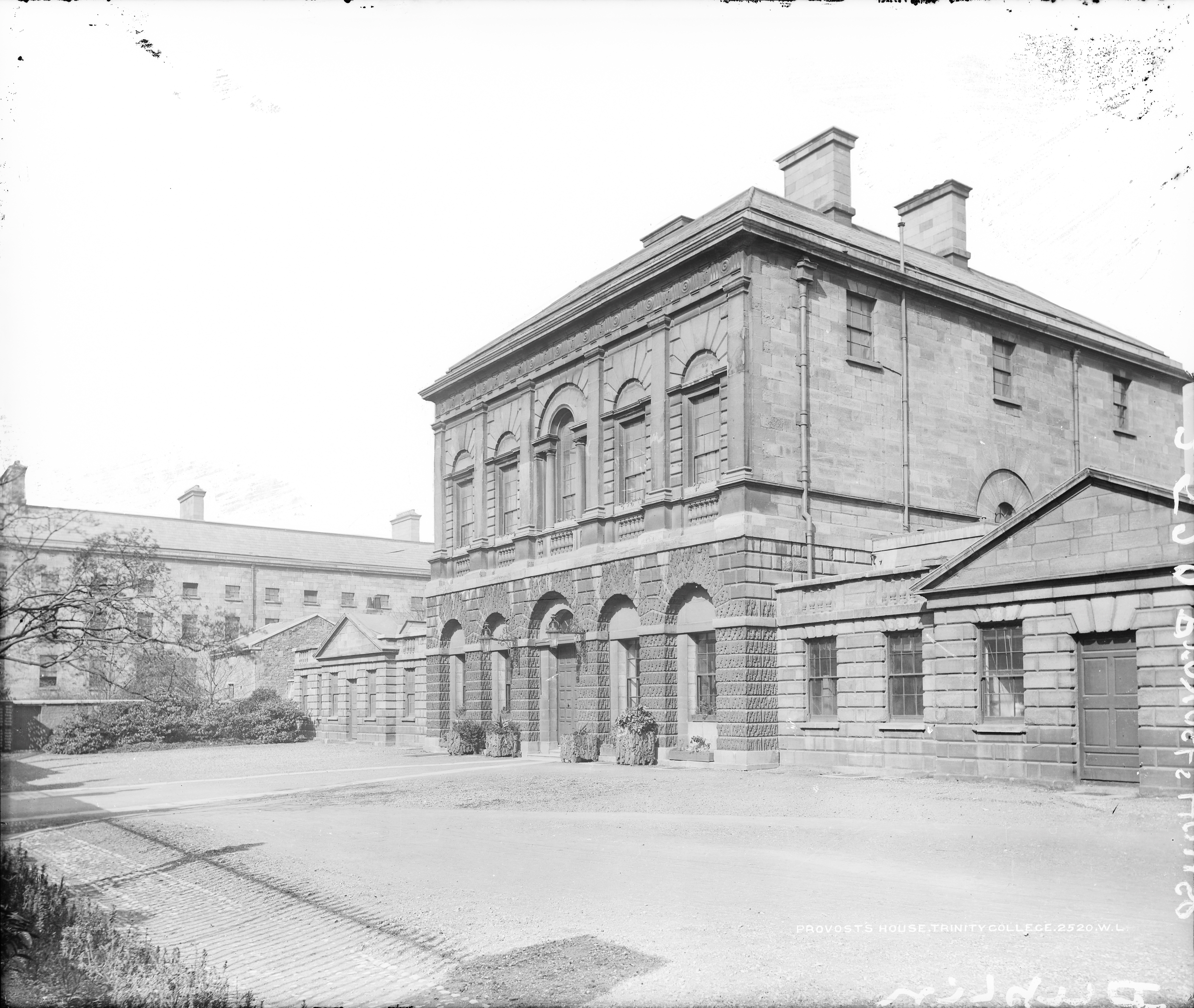
- A view of the Provost's house
- Interactive map of the Provost's House area

General information
- Type: University administrative building and dwelling house
- Location: 1 Grafton Street; Trinity College Dublin; Dublin 2 Ireland
- Completed: 1759

Design and construction
- Architects: John Smyth, Henry Keene
- Other designers: Patrick and John Wall (Stuccowork); Timothy Turner (1763) - Wrought iron ballustrade to back and main stair

Renovating team
- Architect: Christopher Myers (1775) - north pavilion extension

The Provost's House is a five-bay, two-storey house with seven-bay single-storey wings on each side, which dates from 1759 and was built for Provost Francis Andrews of Trinity College.

== History ==
=== Design ===
The designer is unknown but may have been the Dublin architect John Smyth. It has a Palladian design with a central Venetian window and doric pilasters and is similar to that built by Lord Burlington for General Wade (demolished in 1935) in London in 1723, who in turn largely copied a drawing by Andrea Palladio. Another version of the house existed in Potsdam in Germany.

The ground floor ashlar stonework is heavily tooled with round-headed arches spanning over the windows. The centre arch over the entrance door is slightly wider than the others. The upper floor consists of pilasters standing on a string course and supporting a strong cornice at roof level. The two wings are both similar with a three-bay breakfront surmounted by a pediment. It is the only one of Dublin's great Georgian houses which still serves its original purpose. It lies at the north end of Grafton Street near the corner with Nassau Street and has the unique address of No 1 Grafton Street.

Henry Keene may have designed the interior and is recorded as being paid for works in 1764 while carving and guilding of the interior in 1771 is attributed to Richard Cranfield.

Metalwork for the backstairs (1761) and frontstairs (1763) is attributed to Timothy Turner.

It was described by Charles Robert Cockerell in 1823 as follows: "The beautiful front of the Provost's House,...... had been completely spoilt by a high pitched roof and the centre arch having keystone smaller than the sides, producing a disfigured visual effect."

=== Other usage ===
In 2017 the house was used as a neutral venue for negotiations between Fianna Fáil and Fine Gael as part of Irish government formation talks.

=== Gallery ===
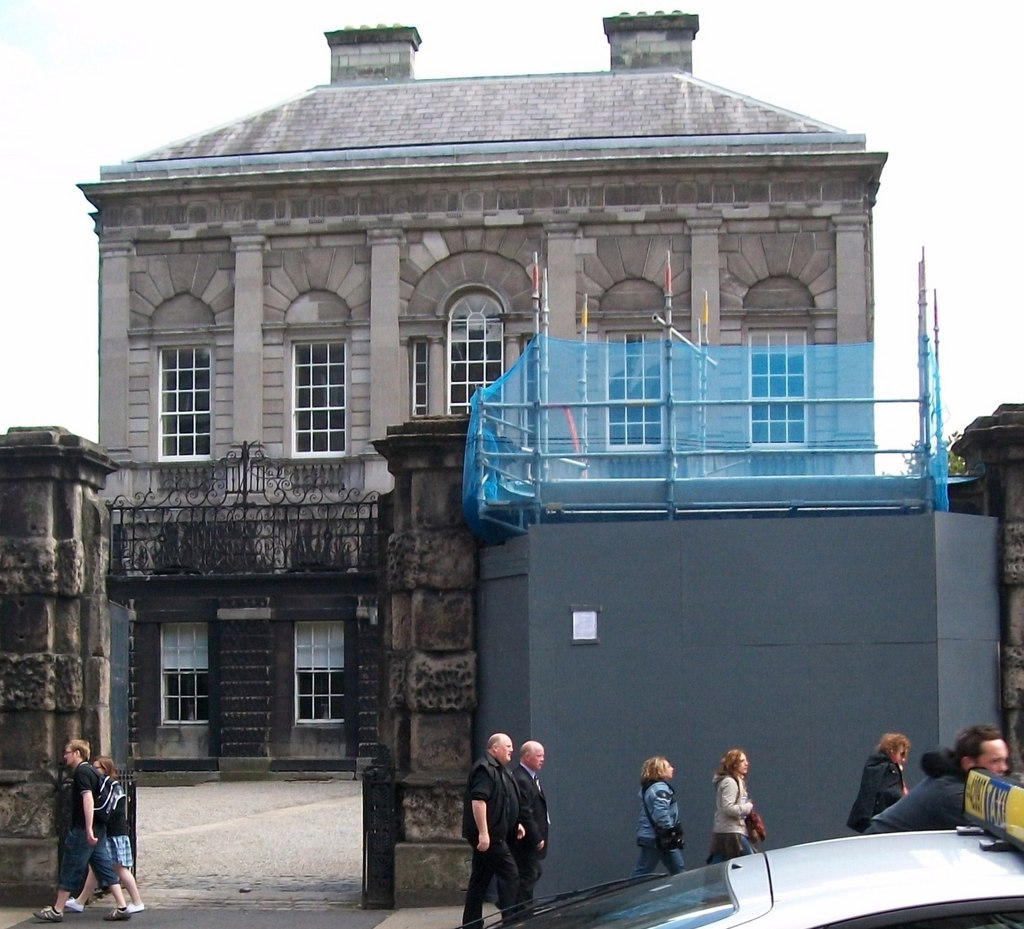
Provost's House during renovations in 2010

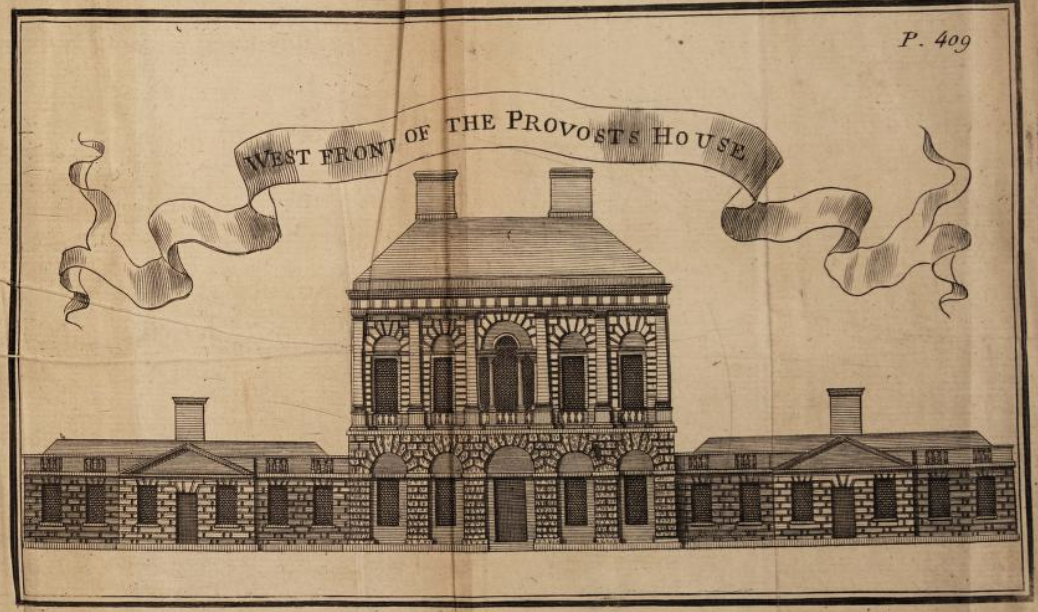
1766 illustration of the house by Jonas Blaymire

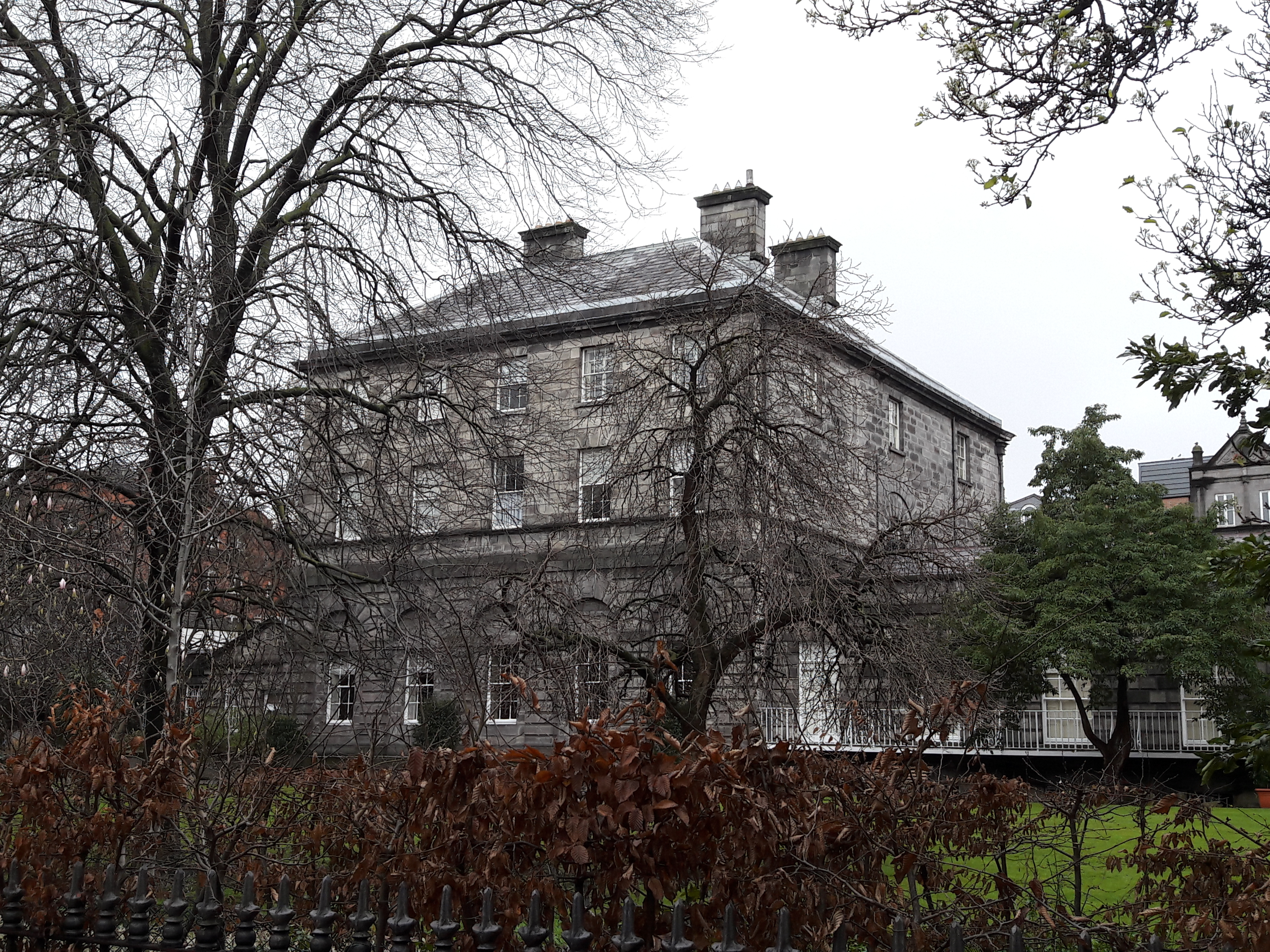
Rear of house

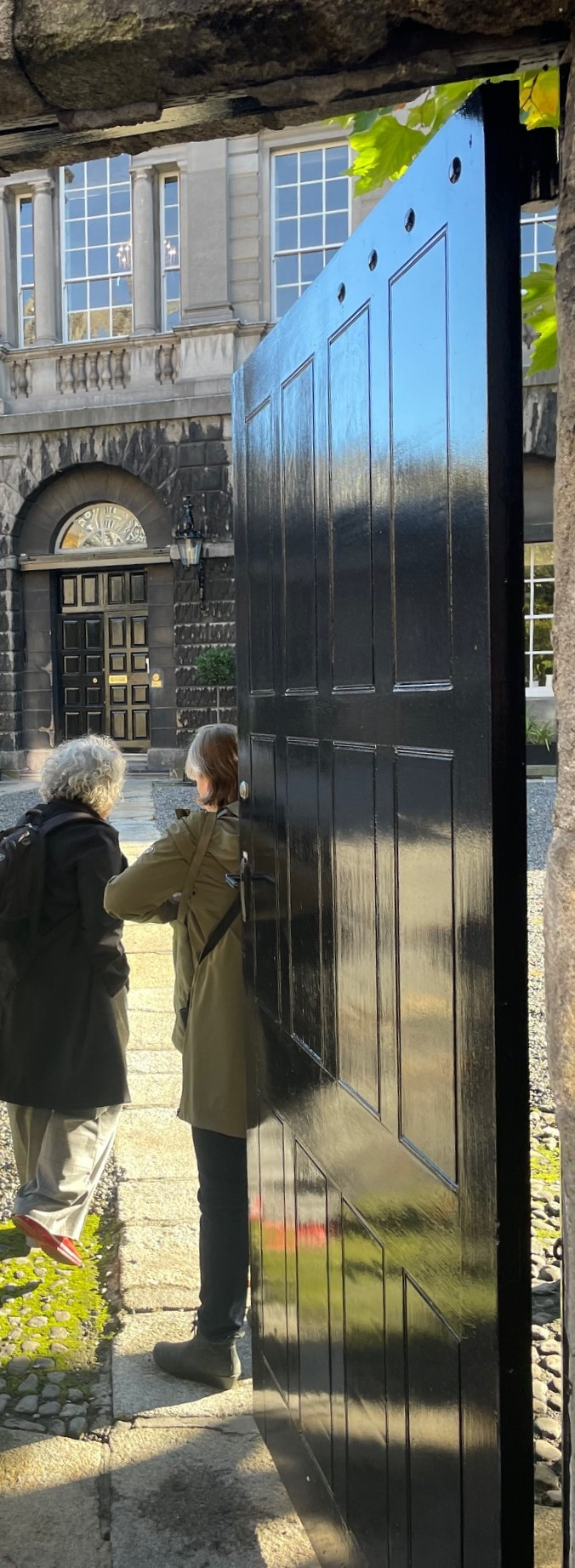
Gate to house

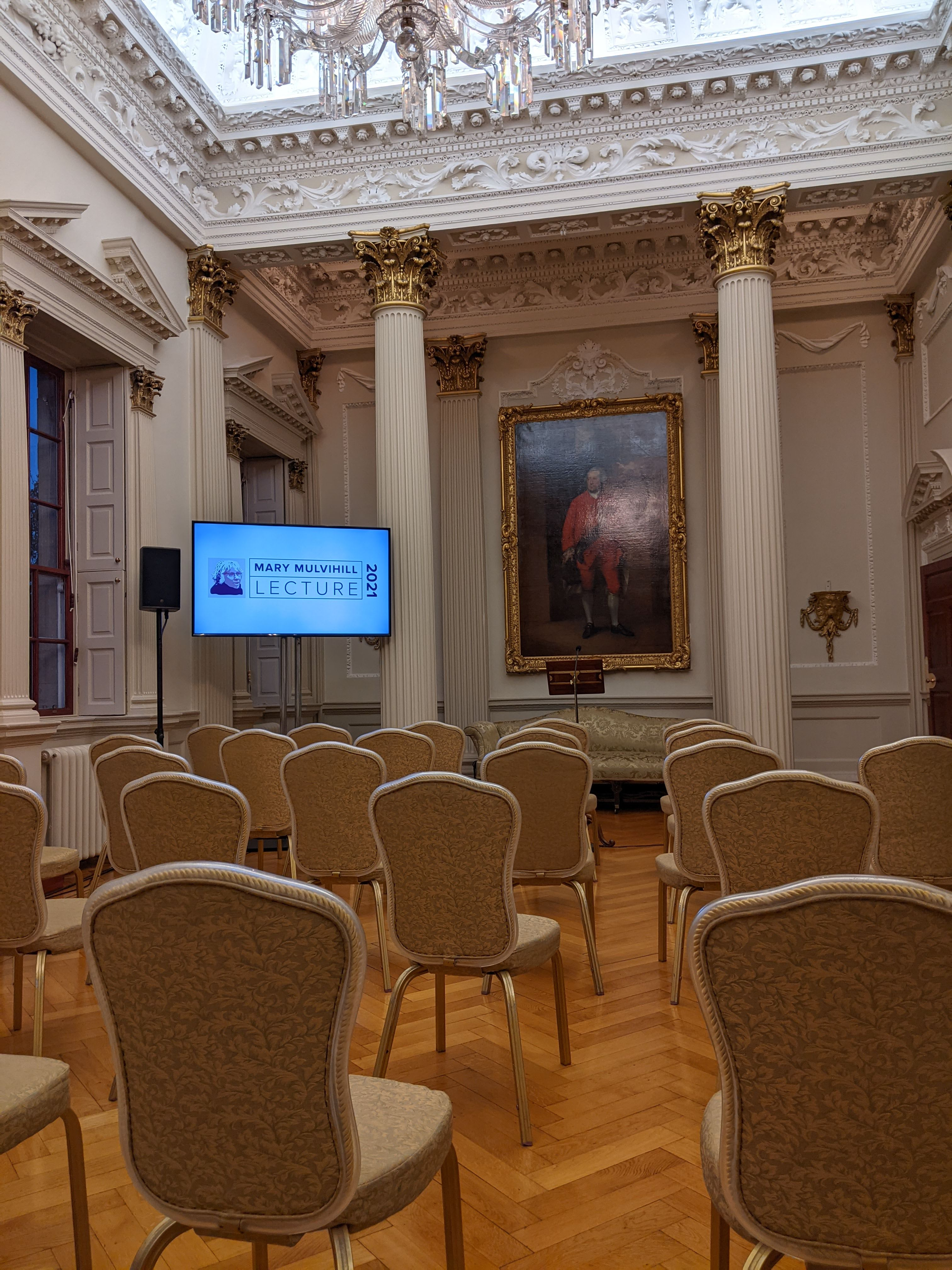
Interior of Provost's House

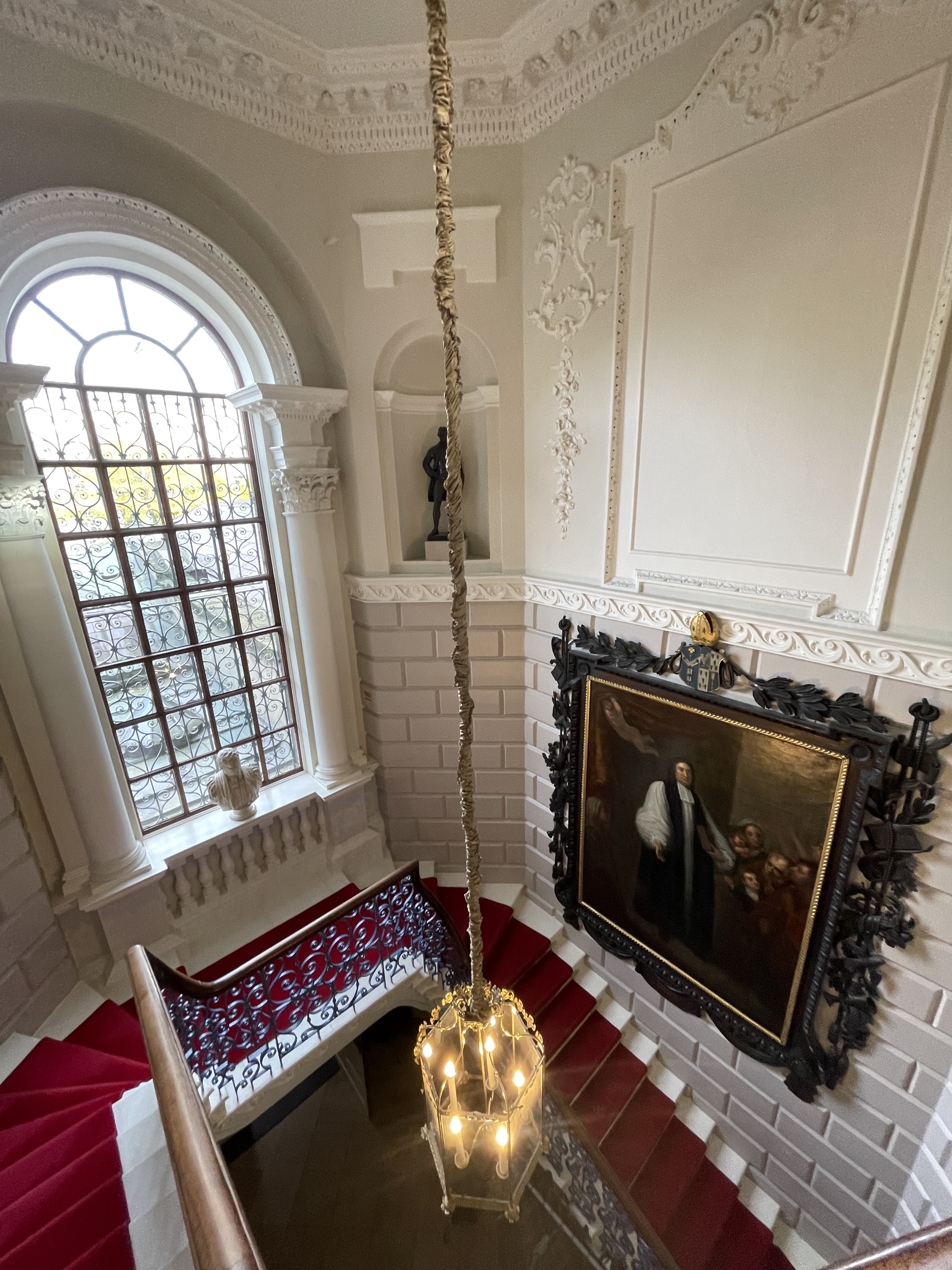
Interior and stairs

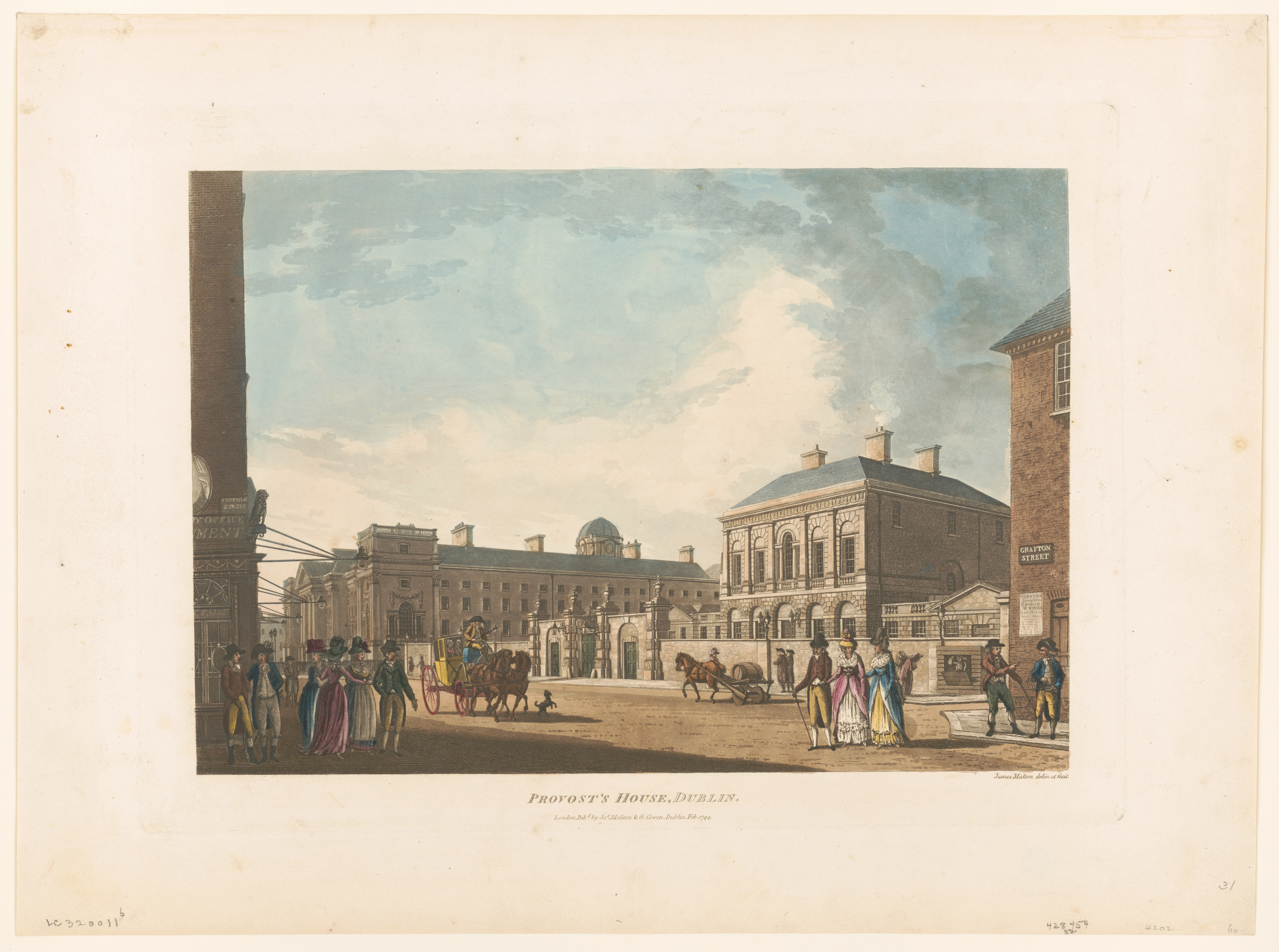
James Malton's engraving of the Provost's house in the 1790s

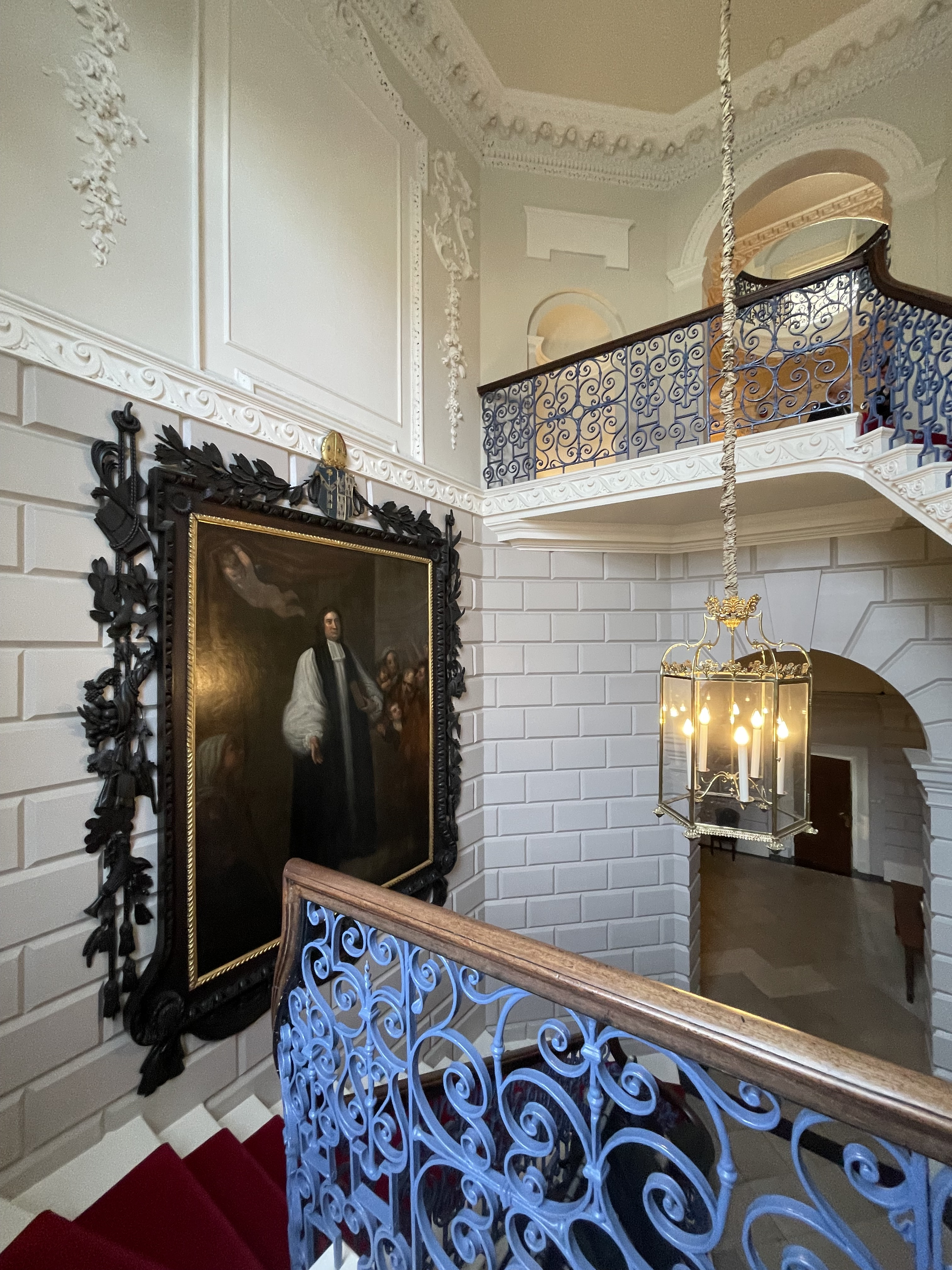
Interior of the house
