= M.J. O'Neill's =

Pub in Dublin

Coordinates: 53.343888°N 6.260737°W

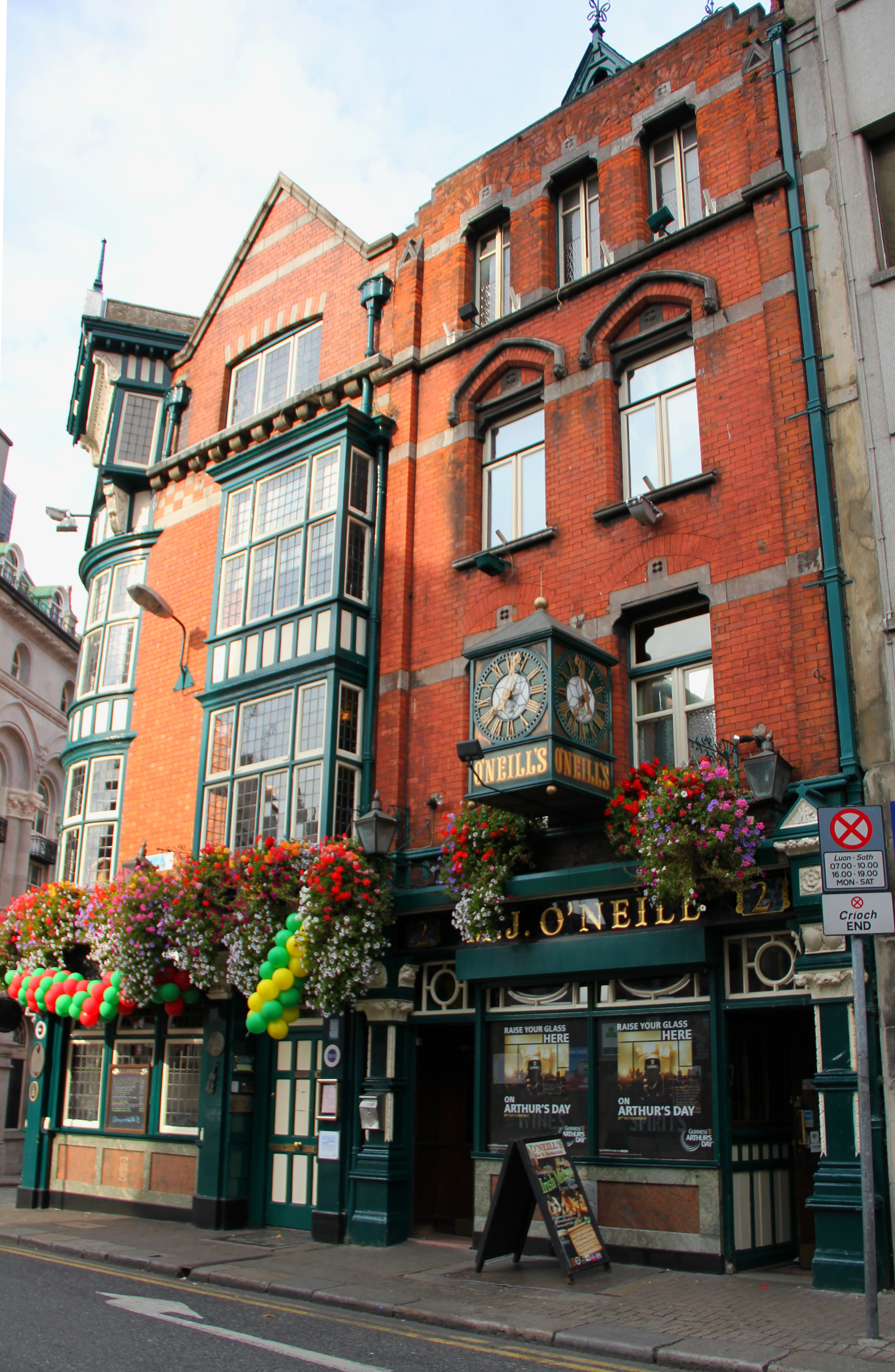
- Exterior view of the pub on Suffolk Street

General information
- Location: 2 Suffolk Street, Dublin 2, Ireland

Website
- oneillspubdublin.com

M.J. O'Neill's known as O'Neill's or O'Neill's Pub and Kitchen is a bar and restaurant in Dublin, Ireland. It occupies 2 Suffolk Street and adjacent buildings, continuing round the corner into Church Lane.

== History ==
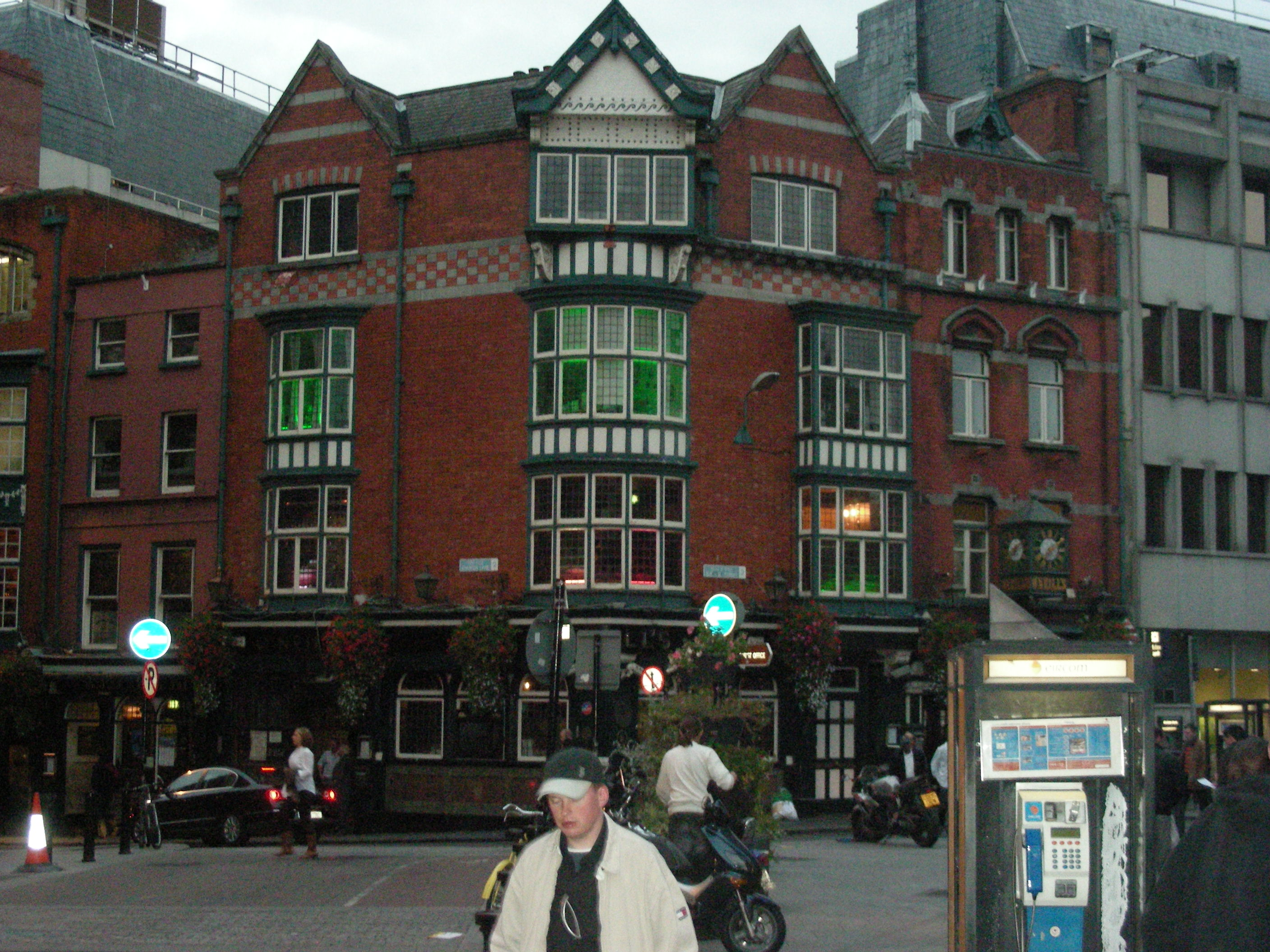
Exterior view of M.J. O'Neill's in 2008

There has been a public house on this site since the 1700s. From 1875 it was owned by the Hogan Brothers, until M.J. O’Neill bought and renamed the premises in 1927.

The corner structure is a four-storey, vaguely of the Arts and Crafts Movement, red-brick and early twentieth century, with Tudor-style projecting bay windows. There is a decorated iron three-dials clock on the Suffolk Street frontage. The building at 2 Suffolks Street is the original public house which dates from 1880-1900. The buildings on Church Lane were originally constructed as retail with offices above in 1909 and designed by George P. Sheridan.

Among the students from Trinity College Dublin who frequently met in the cocktail bar in the 1960s were Brendan Kennelly, Seamus Heaney, Paul Muldoon, Derek Mahon and Michael Longley.

== See also ==
- List of pubs in Dublin
