= Thomas Cooley (artist) =

Irish painter

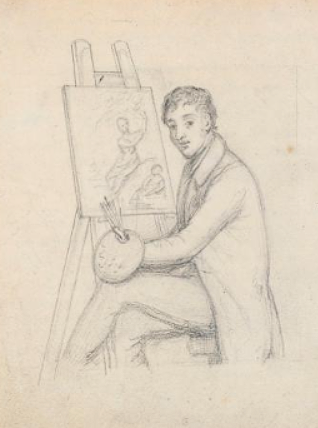
- self portrait sketch held in the National Gallery of Ireland
- Born: 1795; Dublin, Ireland
- Died: 20 June 1872 (aged 76–77); Dublin
- Occupation: portrait painter

Thomas Cooley (1795 – 20 June 1872) was an Irish portrait painter who was deaf-mute.

== Life and family ==
Thomas Cooley was born in Dublin in 1795. His parents were William and Emily Cooley (née Cranfield). His paternal grandfather was the architect, Thomas Cooley, and his maternal grandfather was the sculptor, Richard Cranfield. Cooley was born deaf-mute. His brother was the geographer, William Desborough Cooley. Upon his death, Richard Cranfield left an annuity of £10 to Cooley.

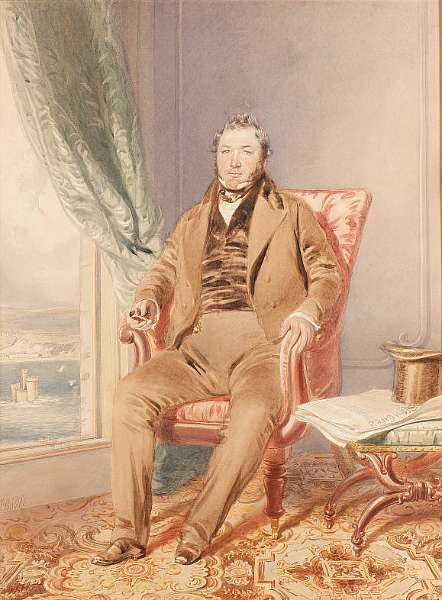
Portrait of an unknown man, 1849

Cooley studied in London, and in 1811 exhibited two works with the Society of Artists in Dublin. In 1815 and 1820, Cooley was awarded premiums by Royal Irish Institution. He was elected an associate of the Royal Hibernian Academy (RHA) in 1826, and resigned in 1829. In 1828, he was appointed portrait painter to the lord lieutenant, Henry William Paget. Cooley lived in London from 1829 and 1847. He exhibited 52 works with the Royal Academy, including a self-portrait, between 1813 and 1846. Upon his return to Dublin, he exhibited regularly with the RHA until he retired in 1854.

By 1850, Cooley was living with his cousin, Thomas Cranfield, on Grafton Street. He died on 20 June 1872, at his lodgings on Harcourt Street, of smallpox. He was buried in an unmarked grave in Mount Jerome cemetery. Walter G. Strickland notes that sales of his works in the early 20th century sold for "trifling" amounts.

The Neptune Gallery, Dublin held the Thomas Cooley Centenary Exhibition in 1972.
