= Thomas Cooley (architect) =

British architect

- Born: 1742; London
- Died: March 1784 (aged 41–42); Anglesea Street, Dublin, Ireland
- Occupation: Architect
- Known for: City Hall, Dublin, Ireland

Thomas Cooley (1740–1784) was an English-born Irish architect who came to Dublin from London after winning a competition for the design of Dublin's Royal Exchange in 1768.

== Early years ==
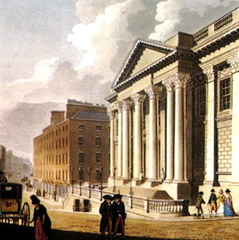
18th-century view of Cooley's Royal Exchange building

Cooley was born to William, a master mason, and Mary Cooley in London, and was baptised on 11 July 1742. He began his career as a carpenter apprenticeship in 1756 with interest in architecture under George Wright at first, then the master joiner in the office of works, William Greenell.

Cooley worked as a draughtsman and clerk to the architect and engineer Robert Mylne (1733–1810), while the latter was building Blackfriars Bridge in London, between 1761 and 1769. In 1769, he won the competition to design a new Royal Exchange in Dublin, and the building, now the City Hall, was completed in 1779. The design shows the influence of Mylne's work, which in turn derived from French neoclassical architecture, with some accusations that Mylne refined the design or otherwise influenced the choice of Cooley as the winner.

== Architecture career and Ireland ==
Arriving in Ireland in 1768, Cooley built several public buildings in Dublin in the neoclassical style, with the Royal Exchange the first building built Dublin in this style. Together with James Gandon (1743–1823), Cooley was part of a small school of architects influenced by Sir William Chambers (1723–1796).

Cooley also designed Newgate Prison (demolished 1893), the Royal Hibernian Marine School, and a chapel, all in Dublin. He was appointed "state architect" in 1775. In 1768 he began another public building in the city, but on his death at the age of 44 in Dublin, the project was handed over to Gandon, who completed it, to his own design, as the Four Courts.

Outside Dublin, Cooley built a number of country houses including Caledon (1779), for James Alexander, later Earl of Caledon. He designed several buildings in Armagh, including the Archbishop's Palace (now the town hall), and the public library.

== List of buildings designed or built by Cooley ==
This is an incomplete list of buildings from Cooley:

- St Patrick's Cathedral, 1769 – survey
- Headfort House, 1769–1771
- Palace Demesne, Archbishop's Palace – remodelling
- Royal Hibernian Marine School, 1770–1773
- Chapel at Phoenix Park, Royal Hibernian Military School, 1771
- Public Library at 43 Abbey Street, Armagh, 1771
- Ardbraccan House, 1772–1775
- Newgate Prison, Dublin, 1773–1781
- The Royal School, Armagh, 1774
- Bishop's Palace, Killaloe, 1774
- Royal Hospital Kilmainham, 1775–1777
- The Four Courts, Inn's Quay - North and west ranges of west courtyard, 1768–1802
- Enlargement of the Linenhall, 1784
- Lisnadill church, 1772
- Armagh gaol, 1780

== Personal ==
From 1781 Cooley remained in Ireland until his death from "bilious fever" at his home, 15 Anglesea Street, in March 1784. He was survived by a son William and a daughter and was predeceased by his wife (whose name is unknown) in 1779. Through his son, one grandson, Thomas Cooley, was a portrait painter who was born deaf, and another William Desborough Cooley, was a geographer.

== Sources ==
- Richardson, Albert E. (2001) Monumental Classic Architecture in Great Britain and Ireland. Courier Dover Publications. ISBN 978-0-486-41534-5
- Summerson, John (1993) Architecture in Britain: 1530-1830 9th edition. Yale. ISBN 978-0-300-05886-4
- Jacqueline O'Brien with Desmond Guinness (1994), Dublin: A Grand Tour, Weidenfeld and Nicolson, London.
