= Wicklow Street =

Street in central Dublin, Ireland

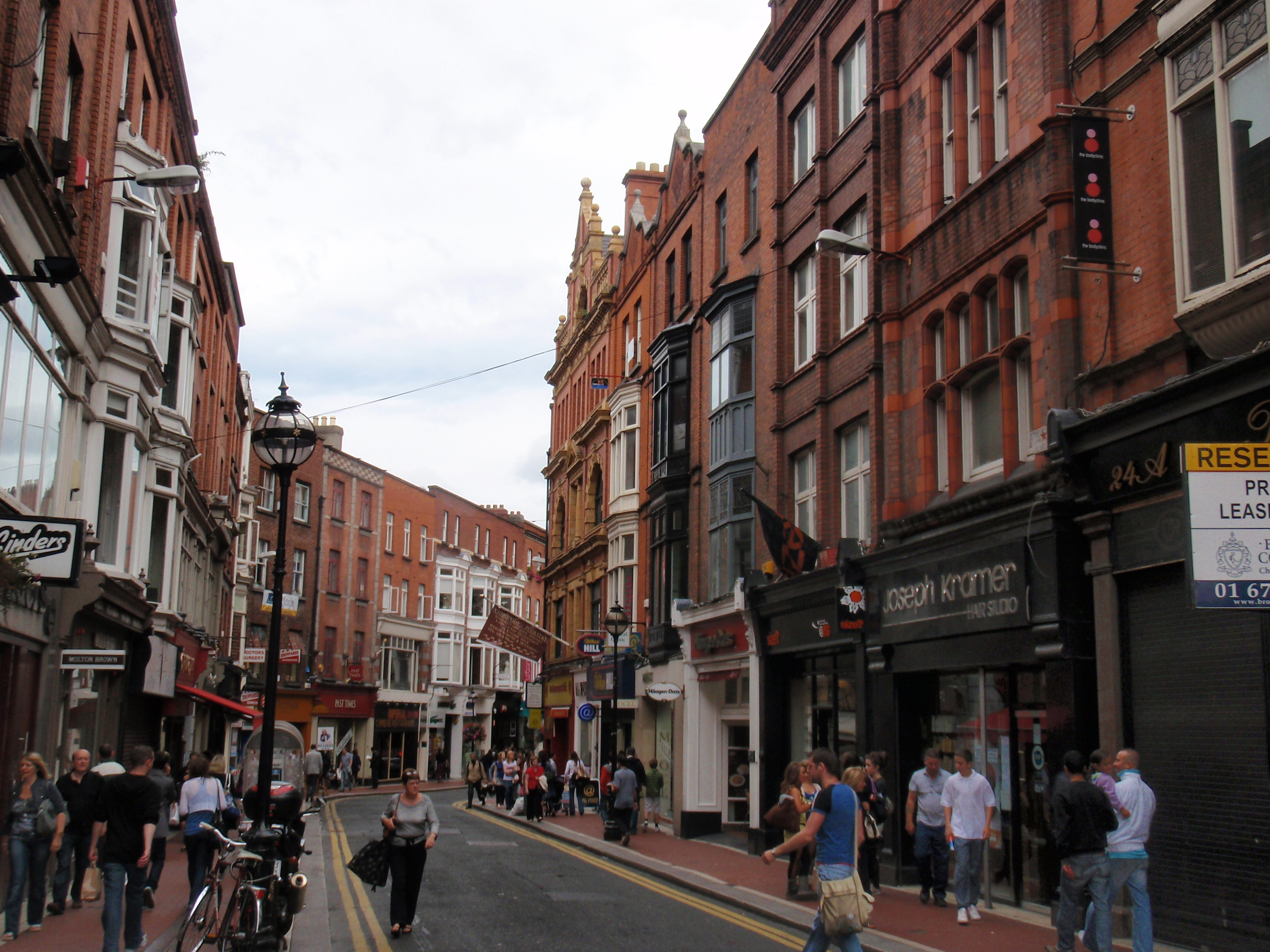

- Location within Central Dublin
- Native name: Sráid Chill Mhantáin (Irish)
- Namesake: County Wicklow
- Length: 170 m (560 ft)
- Width: 11 metres (36 ft)
- Location: Dublin, Ireland
- Postal code: D02
- Coordinates: 53°20′35″N 6°15′40″W
- west end: St Andrew's Street, Exchequer Street, William Street South
- east end: Grafton Street

Other
- Known for: shops

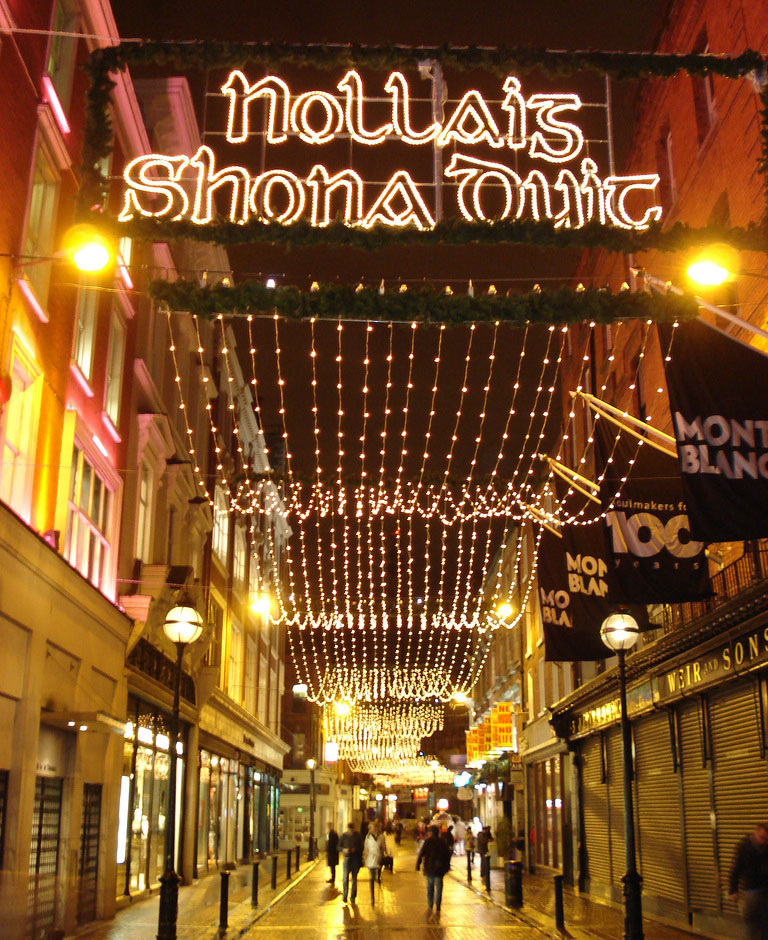
"Happy Christmas" – A Christmas greeting in Irish. (2006)

Wicklow Street (Irish: Sráid Chill Mhantáin) is an established shopping street located in Dublin city centre, running from Grafton Street in the east to the junction of Exchequer Street, South William Street and Andrew's Street in the west.

The street is intersected by Clarendon Street.

== History ==
In 1776, the street was part of Exchequer Street, named after the old Exchequer which was sited there, having formerly been marked as Chequer Lane from at least the time of Charles Brooking's map of Dublin (1728). At this time, Exchequer Street ran from Georges Street onto Grafton Street and the eastern end of the street did not become Wicklow Street until October 1837. The residents of this part of the street petitioned the Wide Streets Commission to have the name changed because of a bad reputation which made it difficult to find respectable tenants for the properties. CT McCready could find no explanation for the choice of Wicklow as the new name.

The jewellers Weir and Sons were established at Nos. 1-3 Wicklow Street in 1869 by Thomas Weir after leaving Wests in College Green. The drapers Brown Thomas moved from Grafton Street into a property on Nos. 38-45 Wicklow Street in 1838.

Since the 1980s, part of the street has been pedestrianised, and it is now one of Ireland's most expensive streets, along with Grafton Street. There are a number of shops, cafes and restaurants on the street.

== See also ==
- Grafton Street (Dublin)
