= St Andrew's Church, Dublin (Church of Ireland) =

Former church in Dublin, Ireland

Coordinates: 53°20′36.77″N 6°15′39.74″W

St. Andrew's Church
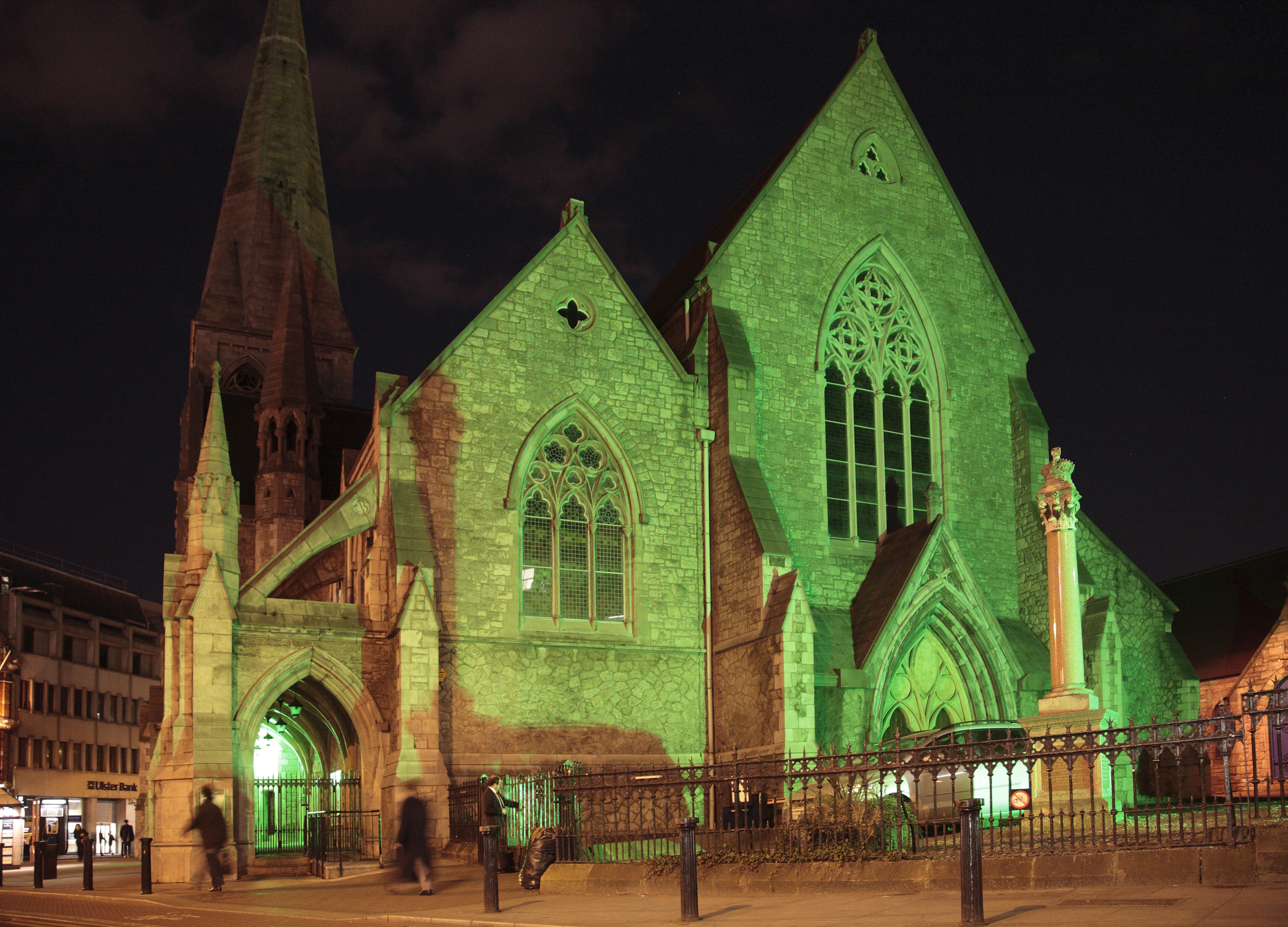
- St Andrew's Church, from St Andrew's Street, in Dublin
- St. Andrew's Church
- Location: Dublin
- Country: Ireland
- Denomination: Church of Ireland

History
- Founded: 16th century
- Dedication: St. Andrew

Administration
- Parish: St. Andrew

St Andrew's Church is a former parish church of the Church of Ireland that is located in St Andrew's Street, Dublin, Ireland. After ceasing to be a church, it housed the main Dublin tourist office of Fáilte Ireland until 2014, and later underwent redevelopment with a view to reopening as a food hall.

Vanessa (Esther Vanhomrigh), former pupil of Dean Swift, is buried at this church.

Close to the St Andrew's Church, in Suffolk Street, there is the statue of Molly Malone; Molly Malone was a semi historical, semi-legendary figure who was commemorated in the same name song ('Cockles and Mussels'), a Dublin anthem.

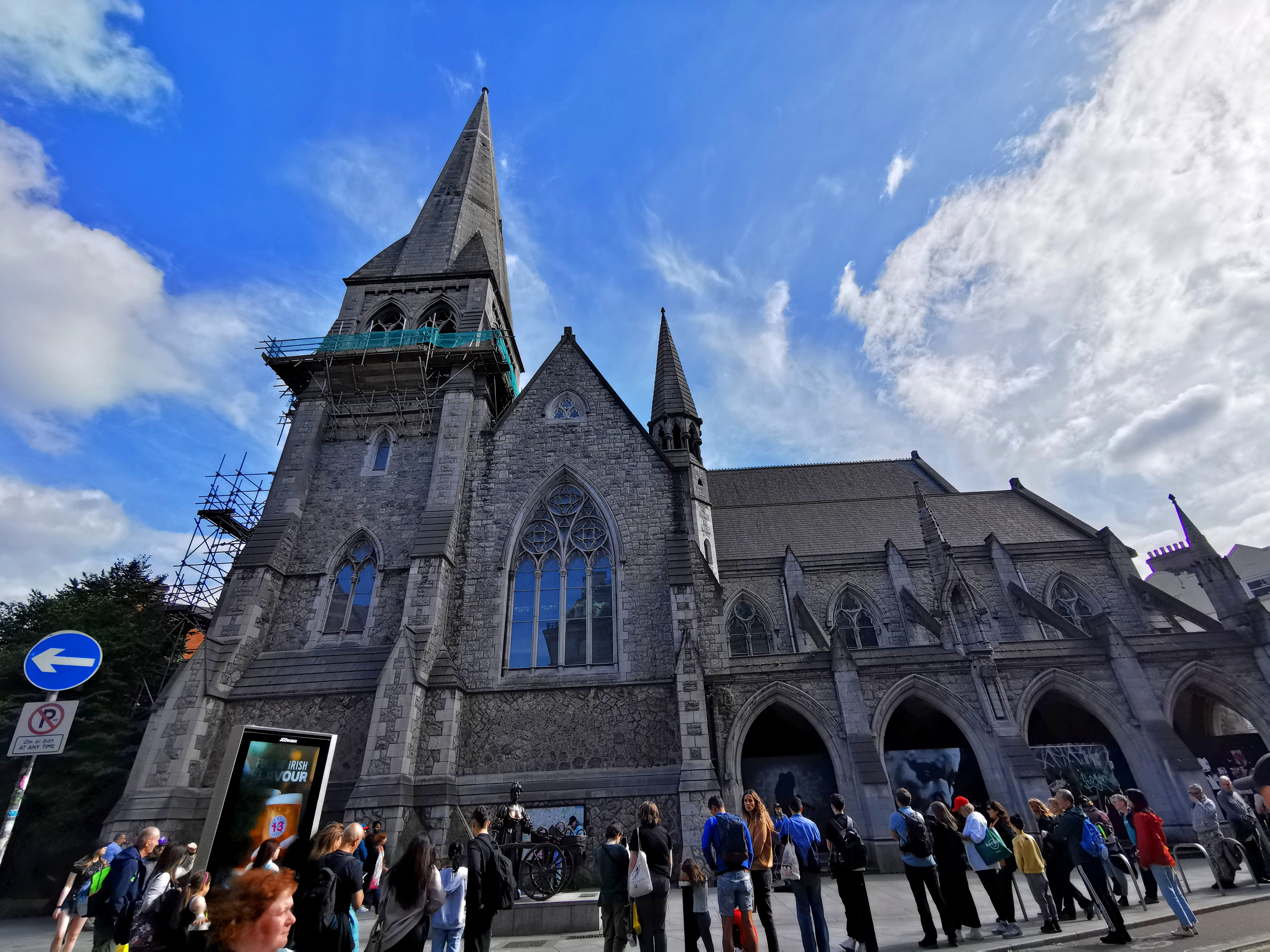
St Andrew's Church, with the statue of Molly Malone

== History ==
The original St Andrew's Church was located on present-day Dame Street, but disappeared during Oliver Cromwell's reign in the mid-17th century.

=== 1670 church ===
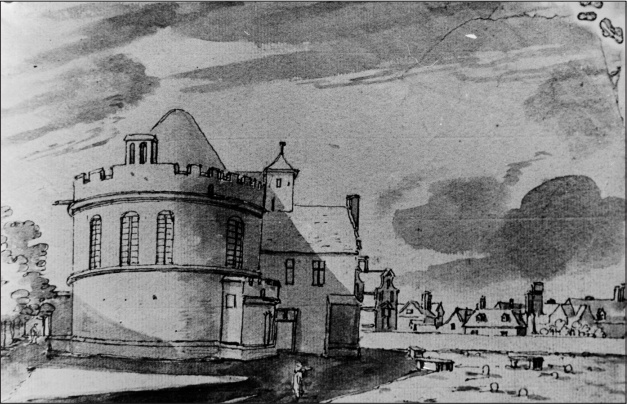
St Andrews Church as it appeared in a painting by Francis Place (1698)

A new church was built around 1670–1674 a little further away from the city walls, on an old bowling-green close to the Thingmote, the old assembly-place of the Norse rulers of the city.

The architect was William Dodson and it was said to have been constructed in an unusual eliptical (round) style and appears in a 1698 illustration by Francis Place.

Local landlords of the time, Lord Anglesey and John Temple were churchwardens.

The neighbouring houses were located in that part of the Dublin Corporation estate known as "the Whole Land of Tib and Tom".

=== Round church ===
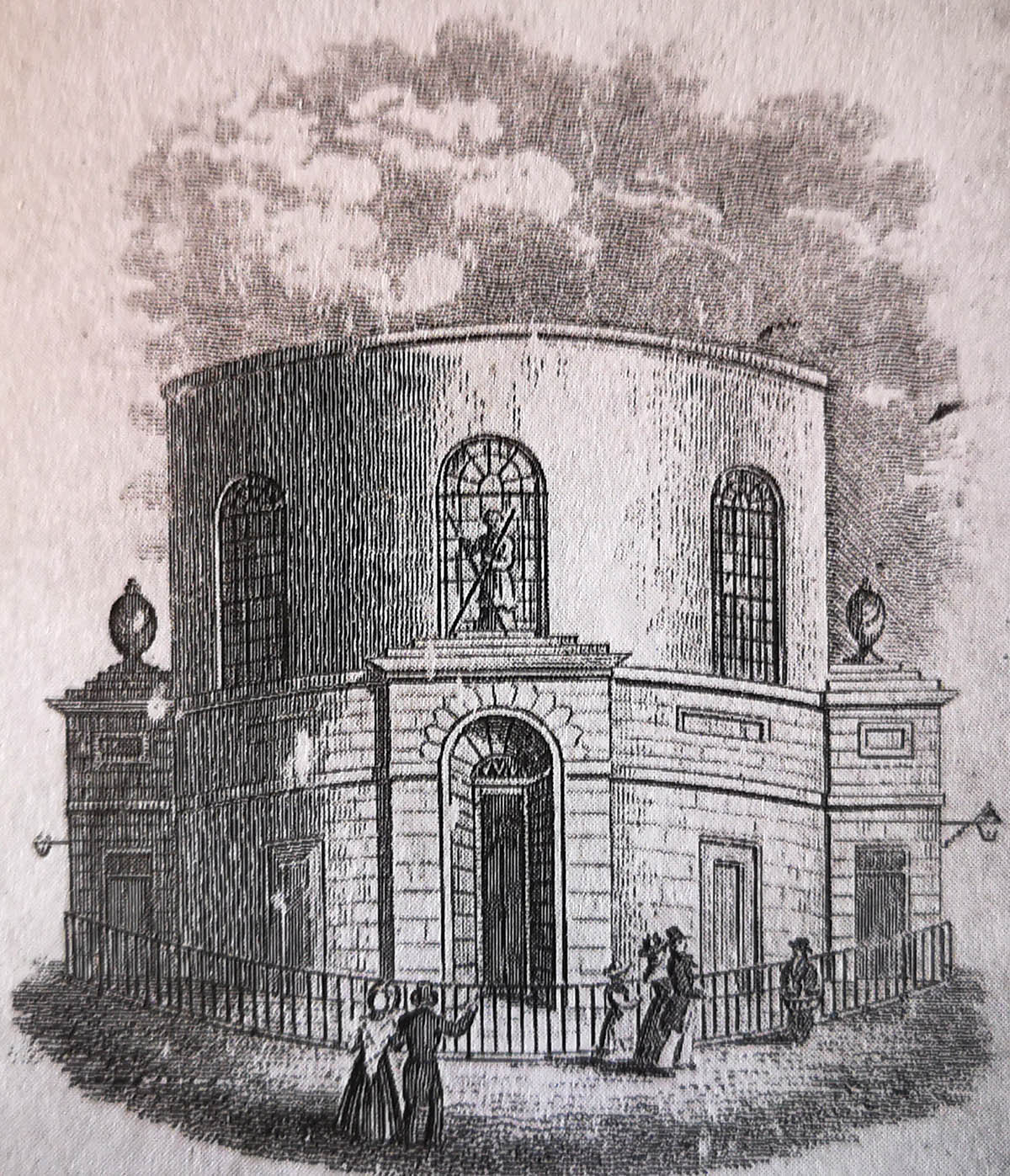
St Andrew's Round Church circa 1810

The church was again largely rebuilt from 1793 to 1807 in the Georgian style to a design laterly by Francis Johnston after the resignation of the initial architect John Hartwell in 1800. The church reopened in March 1807.

It was commonly referred to as the "round church" owing to its shape.

It was said to be in imitation of the Santa Maria della Rotonda in Rome.

=== Modern Gothic church ===
The church burnt down in 1860 and the present gothic structure was constructed in its place around 1862.

== Memorials ==
=== Church and vaults ===
Memorials within the church include:

- Vanessa, former pupil of Jonathan Swift, was buried in St. Andrew's Church in June 1723.
- Thomas Dalton, Lord Chancellor of Ireland, was buried here in 1730
- Marmaduke Coghill, member of Parliament for Dublin University, judge of the Prerogative Court and Chancellor of the Exchequer was buried in the family vault in this church in 1738.

=== Cemetery ===
Burials in the churchyard include:

- Alderman Thomas Pleasants, father of Thomas Pleasants the developer and philanthropist, was buried in St Andrew's churchyard in 1729.
- The surgeon Philip Woodroffe is also buried in the churchyard.

== Parish ==
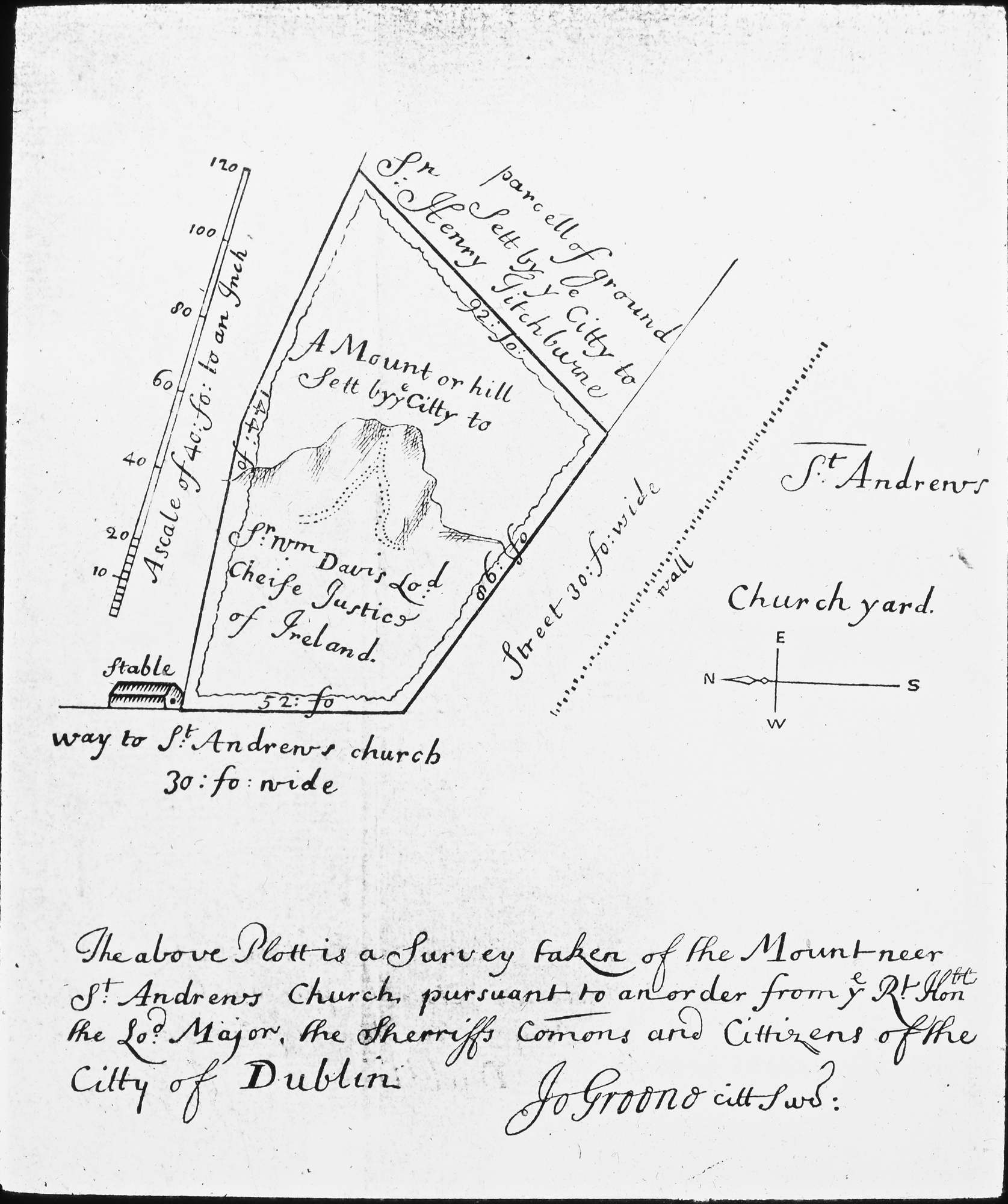
Dublin hand drawn survey from 1682 indicating the site of the churchyard.

The boundaries of the ecclesiastical parish were coextensive to those of the civil parish of St Andrew. The population of this parish in 1901 was 3,058, in 1971 it was 300.
