= South William Street, Dublin =

Street in Dublin, Ireland

William Street South (South William Street)
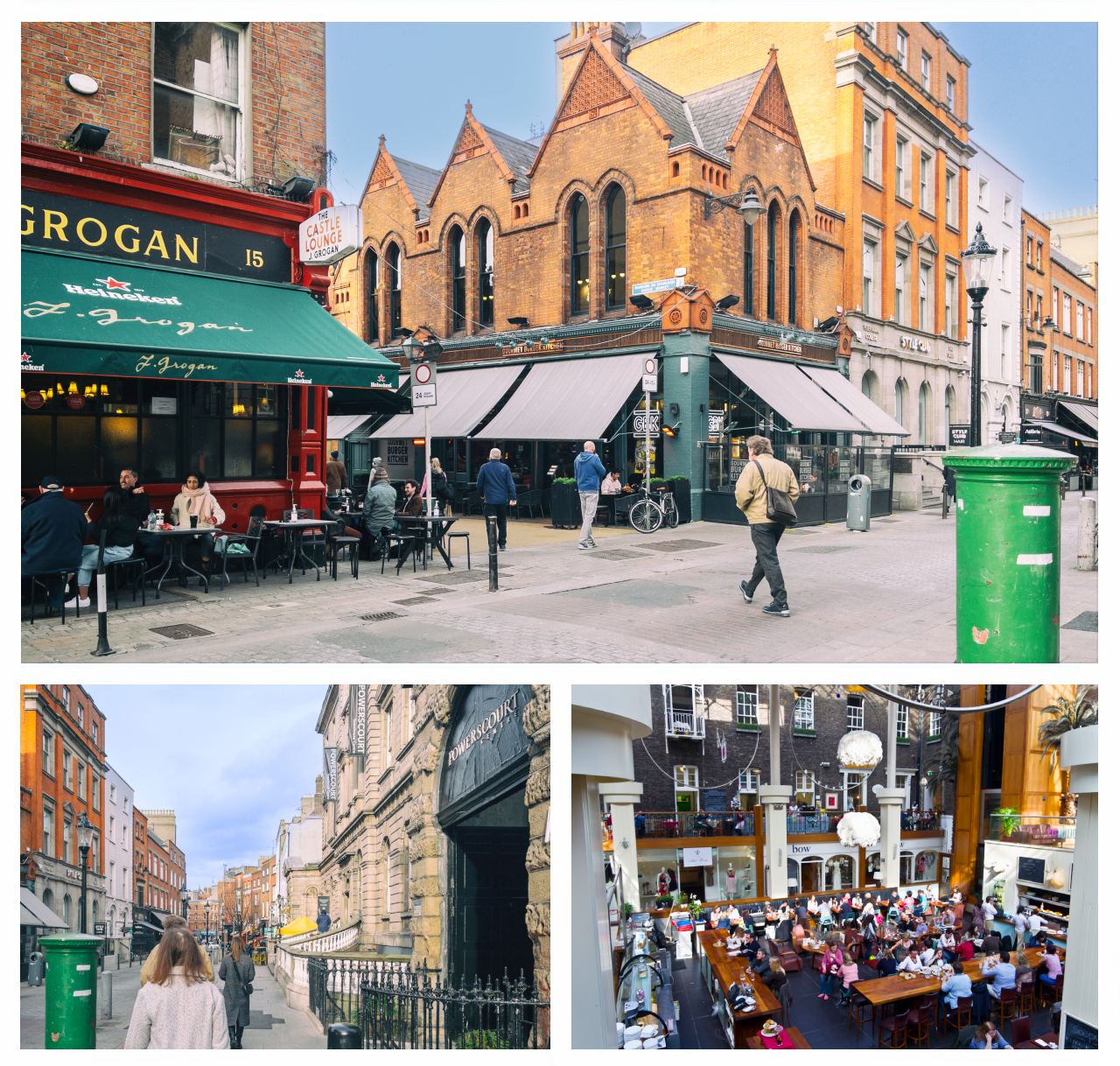
- Clockwise from top: South William Street at its junction with Castle Market; interior of Powerscourt House; South William Street looking northeast

- Location within Central Dublin
- Native name: Plás Mhic Liam Theas (Irish)
- Postal code: D02
- Coordinates: 53.341697°N 6.262876°W

Other
- Known for: Powerscourt House; City Assembly House; Rag trade

South William Street, (Irish: Plás Mhic Liam Theas) is a street located on Dublin's Southside.

== Location ==
It runs from the junction with Exchequer Street, Wicklow Street, and St. Andrew's Street on its northeastern end to the junction of Johnson Place and Stephen Street on its southwestern end.

== History ==
The street was laid out in 1676 by the brewer, William Williams and was part of Dublin's 17th-century expansion beyond its medieval walls. The street has one of the largest and most complete groups of 18th-century merchants' houses in the city. However, M'Cready claims the street is named after King William III.

Number 12-13 on the street was built as the headquarters to the Dublin Artisans' Dwellings Company.

=== 21st century ===
In 2012, the street was rebranded as being the centre of Dublin's "Creative Quarter", an area noted for its "independent design stores, fashion outlets and cafes". The UK's Academy of Urbanism has noted that the street has transformed "from the bustling heart of the rag trade to a well-known spot for retail entrepreneurs, start-ups and those in search of a good night out".

=== Powerscourt House ===
The street is dominated by Powerscourt House, the former Dublin townhouse of Viscount Powerscourt. It was constructed in the 18th century for Richard Wingfield, 3rd Viscount Powerscourt, a member of the Irish House of Lords. The townhouse was the Wingfield family's urban residence when they were visiting from the Powerscourt Estate in Enniskerry, County Wicklow.

Designed by Robert Mack, it dates from between 1771 and 1774. The court at the rear of the building was created with the addition of three brown-brick office buildings from 1809 to 1811. The townhouse was purchased and redeveloped as a shopping centre between 1978 and 1981 and is now known as the Powerscourt Townhouse Centre.

=== Gallery ===
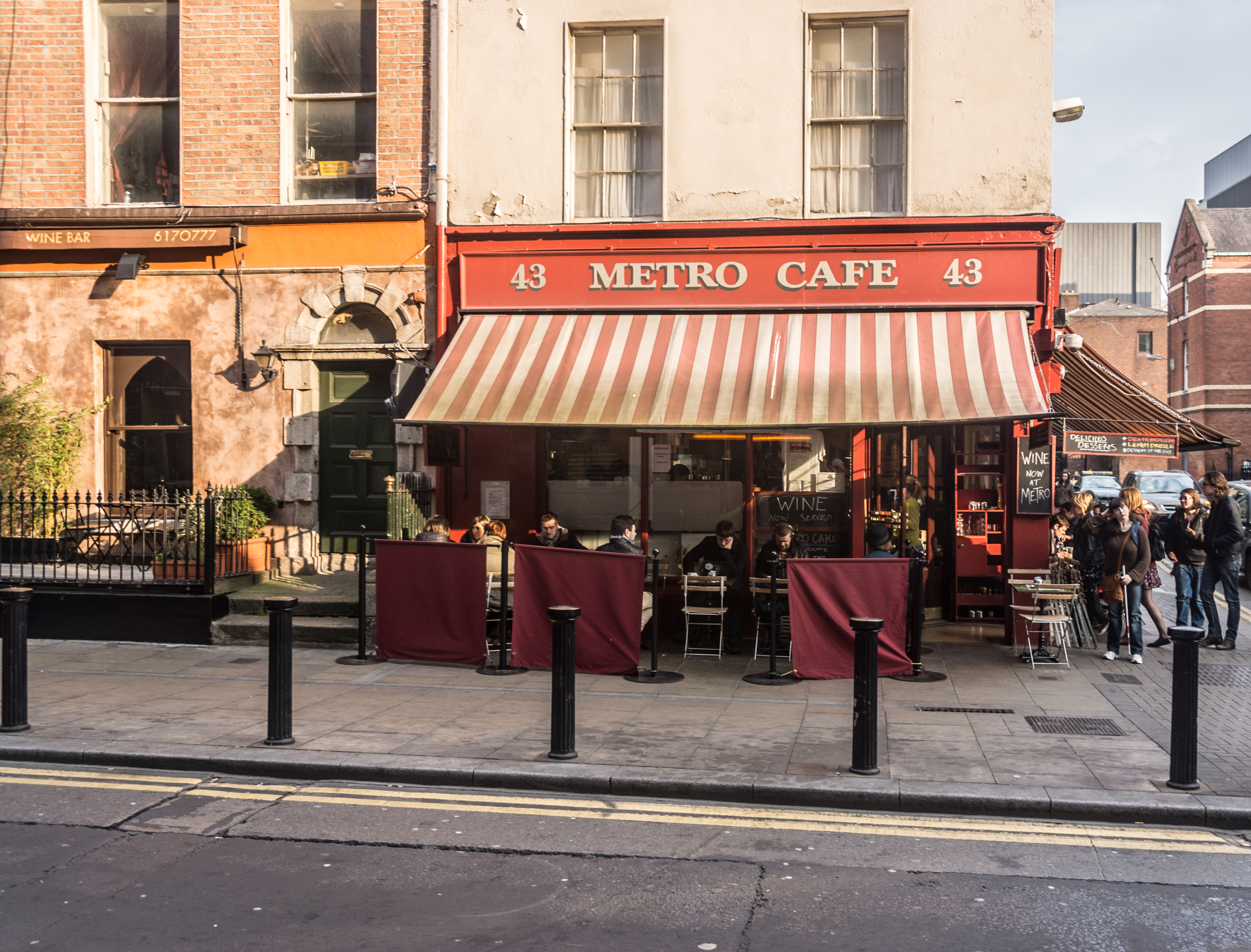
Metro Cafe, South William Street

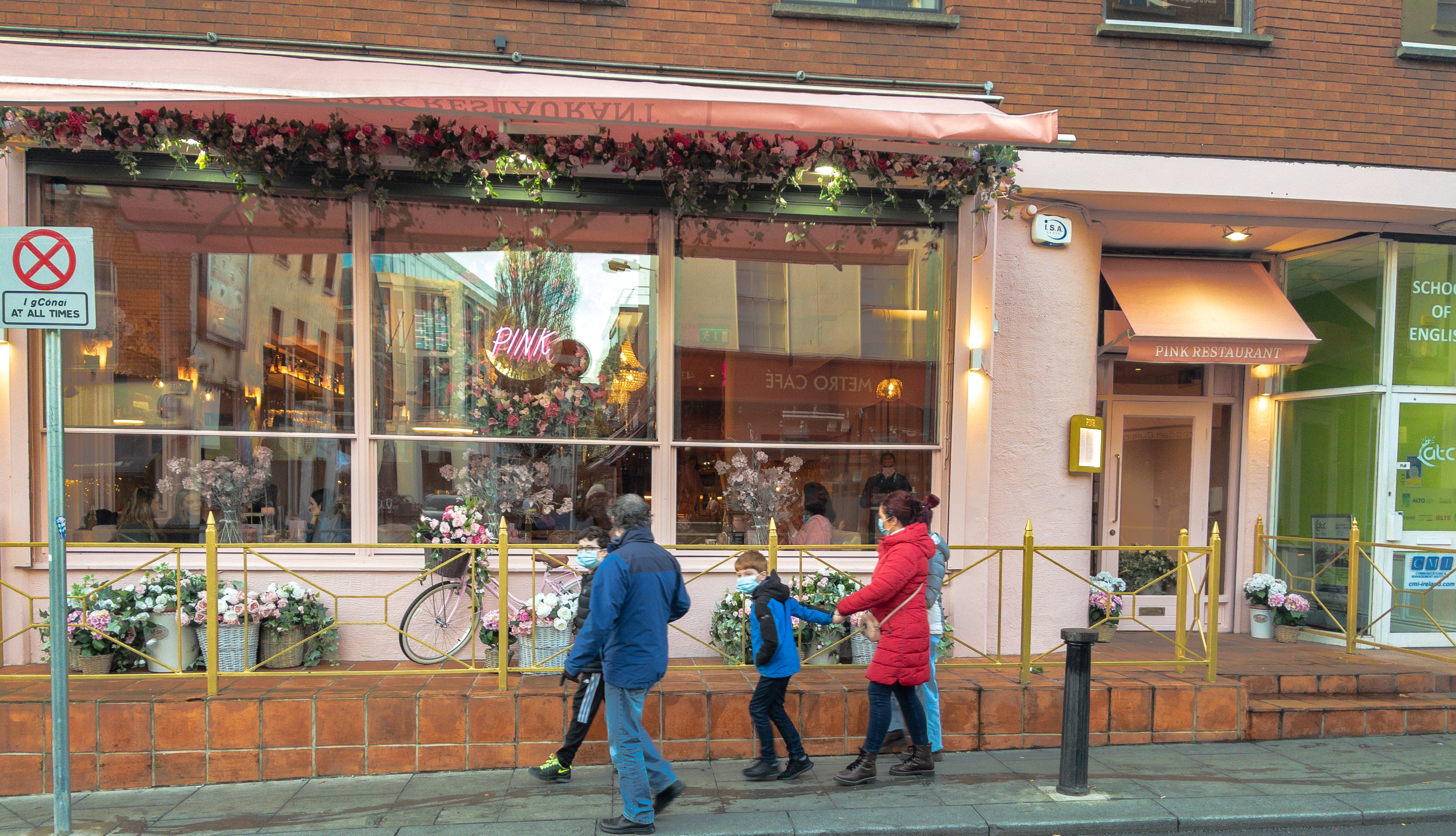
Pink restaurant, South William Street

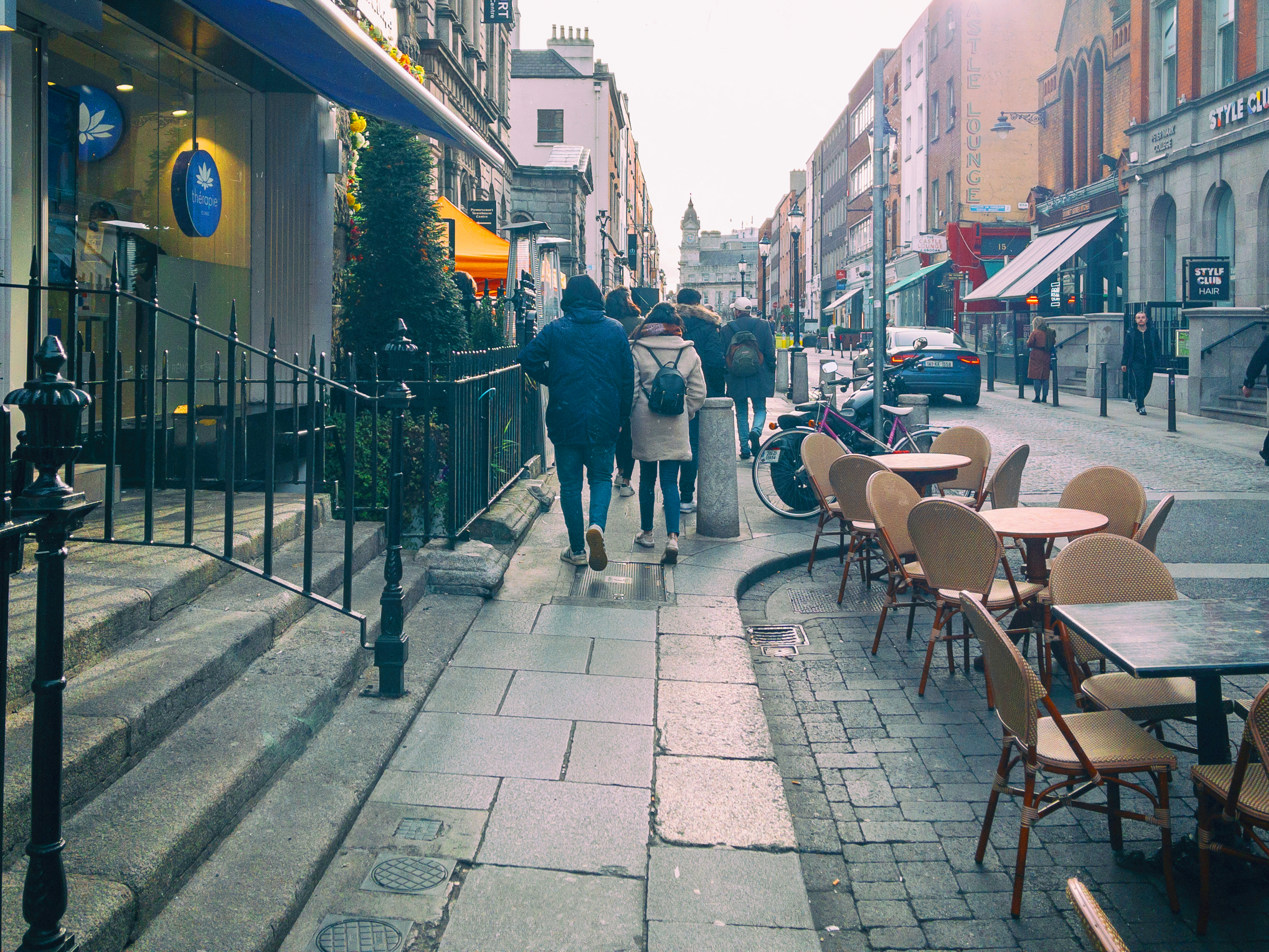
South William Street, looking southwest

== See also ==
- List of streets and squares in Dublin
