= List of pubs in Dublin (city) =

This is a list of pubs in the city of Dublin, Ireland. Pubs on this list are under the jurisdiction of Dublin City Council.

== List of pubs ==
Name	Image	Location	Status	Owner	Notes
The Auld Triangle		Dorset Street	Open		
The Bleeding Horse		Camden Street	Open		
The Bailey		Duke Street	Open	Michael Holland	
The Berkeley		Berkeley Street	Open		
The Bernard Shaw		Richmond Street	Closed		Moved to Phibsborough
The Brazen Head		Merchant's Quay	Open		
Bruxelles		South Anne Street	Open	Louis Fitzgerald	
Davy Byrne's		Duke Street	Open	William Dempsey	
Dawson Lounge		Dawson Street	Open	The Linnane family	
Doheny & Nesbitt		Baggot Street	Open	Tom and Paul Mangan	
The Church		Mary Street, Dublin	Open		
The Cobblestone		Smithfield, Dublin	Open		
Eamonn Doran's		Crown Alley	Closed		
Fagan's		Drumcondra Road Lower	Open		
Foley's		Merrion Row	Open		
Gleesons		Booterstown Ave.	Open	Gleeson Family	Frequented by Eamon De Valera
The George		South Great George's Street	Open	Mercantile Group	
Hynes		Gloucester Place Lower and Railway Street corner	Closed	Michael Hynes	
Leonard's Corner		Clanbrassil Street	Open		
Lincoln's Inn		19 Lincoln Place	Open		
McDaids		Harry Street	Open		
McGeough's Pub (The Bohemian Bar)		Phibsborough Road	Open		
Merchants' Arch		Wellington Quay	Open	Tom Doone	
M.J.O'Neill's		Suffolk Street	Open		
Mulligan's		8 Poolbeg Street, Dublin 2, DO2 TK71	Open	Gary Cusack	
Ned Scanlons		Townsend Street	Closed in 2017		
O'Brien's		Sussex Terrace	Open		
O'Donoghue's Pub		Baggot Street	Open	The Barden Family	
O'Donoghue's Pub		Suffolk Street	Open	Des Markey	
O'Neill's Pub		Pearse Street	Open		
Oliver St John Gogarty		Temple Bar	Open	Martin Keane	
The Oval		Abbey Street	Open		
The Palace Bar		Fleet Street	Open		
Pantibar		Capel Street, Dublin 1	Open		
Patrick Conway's		Parnell Square	Closed		
Peter's Pub		Johnson Place, Dublin 2	Open		
Slattery's		Capel Street	Open		
Slattery's		Beggars' Bush	Open		
The Duke		Duke Street	Open		
The Ferryman		Sir John Rogerson's Quay	Open		
The Foggy Dew		Fownes Street	Open		Named after Foggy Dew (Irish ballad)
The Harbourmaster		International Financial Services Centre	Open		
The Lord Edward		Christchurch Place	Open		
The Porterhouse		Parliament Street	Open		
The Hill		Mountpleasant, Ranelagh	Open		
The International Bar		Wicklow Street	Open	John and James Donohue	
The Irish House		Wood Quay	Closed in 1968		
The Long Hall		Aungier Street	Open		
The Old Harbour		Echlin Street	Open		
The Shakespeare		Parnell Street	Open		
The Stag's Head		Dame Lane	Open	Louis Fitzgerald	
The Swan		Aungier Street	Open	Seán and Rónan Lynch	
The Temple Bar		Temple Bar, Dublin	Open	Tom and Jackie Cleary	
The Widow Scallans		Pearse Street	Closed		Closed soon after the murder of Martin Doherty at the pub in 1994.
Tommy O'Gara's		Manor Street	Open		
Toner's Pub		Baggot Street	Open	The Quinn family	
Whelan's		Camden Street	Open	Mercantile Group	
Belvedere Bar		The Belvedere Hotel, Denmark Street Great, Rotunda			
The Sackville		16 Sackville Place, North City, Dublin, D01 V0C7			For a time called Biddy Mulligans in 2024-25
Bleeker Street Bar		68 Dorset Street Upper, Rotunda, Dublin 1, D01 KT22			
Brannigan's		9 Cathedral Street, North City, Dublin, D01 FH29			
Bridge Tavern		6 Summerhill Parade, Dublin, D01 YY62			
Briody's		97 Marlborough St, North City, Dublin 1, D01 PP92			
Cassidy's Hotel		O'Connell Street Upper, Rotunda, Dublin 1, D01 V3P6			
Cleary's Pub		36 Amiens Street, Mountjoy, Dublin, D01 H6Y6			
Delahunty's		99 Dorset Street Upper, Phibsborough, Dublin, D01 F5Y8			
Electric Circus		81-82 Talbot Street, North City, Dublin 1, D01 DK12			
Fibber Magee's		80-81 Parnell Street, Rotunda, Dublin 1, D01 CK74			
Flanagan's Bar & Restaurant		61 O'Connell Street Upper, North City, Dublin 1, D01 Y274			
Gin Palace Dublin		42 Middle Abbey Street, North City, Dublin, D01 R260			
Glynn's Wellington House		100 Dorset Street Upper, Phibsborough, Dublin 1, D01 V6X5			
Grainger's Café Bar 5		1 Talbot Street, Mountjoy, Dublin, D01 P6K1			
Grand Central		10-11 O'Connell Street Upper, North City, Dublin, D01 XY61			
Hemi Bar		The Gibson Hotel, Point Square, North Wall, Dublin, D01 X2P2			
Hill 16 Pub		30 Gardiner Street Middle, Mountjoy, Dublin, D01 PK61			
Hotel St. George by Nina		7 Parnell Square East, Rotunda, Dublin, D01 E176			
Jack Nealons		165-166 Capel Street, North City, Dublin, D01 XD72			
Jacobs Inn Bar		Jacob's Inn, 21-28 Talbot Place, Mountjoy, Dublin, D01 W5P8			
Joxer Daley's		103 Dorset Street Upper, Phibsborough, Dublin 1, D01 YY48			
Juno		58 Dorset Street Lower, Dublin 1, D01 EP86			
Kavanagh's The Temple		71 Dorset Street Upper, Rotunda, Dublin 1, D01 KR29			
Knightsbridge Bar & Bistro		Arlington Hotel, 23-25 Bachelors Walk, O'Connell Bridge, North City, Dublin 1			
Krewe North		51-52 Capel Street, North City, Dublin 1, D01 DA58			
Lloyd's Bar & Lounge		46 Amiens Street, Mountjoy, Dublin, D01 PV40			
Madigan's Earl Street		25 N Earl Street, North City, Dublin 1, D01 KX67			
Madigan's O'Connell Street		19 O'Connell Street Upper, North City, Dublin 1, D01 E796			
Madigan's Pub Connolly Station		Connolly Station, Amiens Street, North Wall, Dublin			
McGettigan's Cookhouse		The Address Hotel Connolly, Amiens Street, Mountjoy, Dublin 1, D01 X6P6			
McNeill's Pub		140 Capel Street, North City, Dublin, D01 F9R2			
Meaher's O'Connell Bridge		3 Eden Quay, North City, Dublin, D01 W896			
Mema's		155 R803, Rotunda, Dublin			
Molloy's Pub		59 Talbot Street, Mountjoy, Dublin, D01 K298			
Mooney's Bar & Restaurant		4 Abbey Street Lower, North City, Dublin, D01 V0Y3			
Mullet's Bar		45 Amiens Street, Mountjoy, Dublin 1, D01 WV02			
Murray's Bar		33-34 O'Connell Street Upper, Rotunda, Dublin 1, D01 E0W2			
MV Cill Airne		Quay 16 North Wall Quay, North Wall, Dublin 1			
Noctor's		34 Sheriff Street Lower, North Wall, Dublin, D01 TK38			
O'Connell's		30 Bachelors Walk, North City, Dublin 1, D01 YP70			
Oly's Bar and Restaurant		Hilton, Custom House Quay, North Wall, Dublin, D01 V9X5			
O'Reilly's Bar & Lounge		151 Parnell Street, Rotunda, Dublin, D01 XW93			
Parnell Heritage Pub		72-74 Parnell Street, North City, Dublin 1,			
Pennylane		Regent House, 2 Strand Street Great, North City, Dublin, D01 P9K1			
Phil Ryan's		The Hogan Stand 512-514 North Circular Road, Mountjoy, Dublin 1, D01 CF57			
Piper's Corner		105-106 Marlborough Street, North City, Dublin, D01 FD28			
Ryan's Bar		19 Store Street, Mountjoy, Dublin 1, D01 NY02			
The Academy		57 Middle Abbey Street, North City, Dublin 1, D01 W573			
The Big Romance		98 Parnell Street, Rotunda, Dublin, D01 T2T3			
The Big Tree Pub		Dorset Street Lower, Dublin, DO1A2Y5			
The Black Sheep Galway Bay Brewery,		61 Capel Street, Rotunda, Dublin			
The Boar's Head		149 Capel Street, North City, Dublin, D01 T927			
The Bottle Boy		The Mayson Hotel, 82 North Wall Quay, North Wall, Dublin 1, D01 XR83			
The Brew Dock		1 Amiens Street, Mountjoy, Dublin 1			
The Castle Vaults		Castle Hotel, 1-4 Gardiner Row, Rotunda, Dublin, D01 R640			
The Celt		81 Talbot St, North City, Dublin, D01 YK51			
The Confession Box		88 Marlborough St, North City, Dublin 1, D01 X267			
The Flowing Tide		9 Abbey Street Lower, North City, Dublin, D01 H6P1			
The Glasshouse Dublin		The Glasshouse Dublin, Point Square Village, North Wall, Dublin 1			
The Grand Social		35 Liffey St. Lower, North City, Dublin 1, D01 C3N0			
The Green Room Bar		N Wall Ave, North Wall, Dublin			
The Hideout House		1-2 Campbells Row, Dublin 1, D01 VP03			
The James Connelly		11 Eden Quay, North City, Dublin			
The King's Inn		42 Bolton St, Dublin, D01 EH56			
The Living Room		Cathal Brugha St, Rotunda, Dublin 1			
The Lotts Café Bar		9 Liffey St. Lower, North City, Dublin, D01 E3F9			
The Morris Bar & Grill		15 Talbot St, North City, Dublin, D01 V9P2			
The Silver Penny (JD Wetherspoon)		JD Wetherspoons, 12A Abbey Street Lower, North City, Dublin 1, D01 AY67			
The Spencer Cocktail Bar		The Spencer Hotel, Excise Walk, International Financial Services Centre, Dublin 1, D01 X4C9			
The Station Bar		21 Store St, North Wall, Dublin, D01 T9R2			
The Wiley Fox		28 Eden Quay, North City, Dublin 1, D01 DE44			
The Wool Shed		198-200, Parnell Street, Centre, Dublin, D01 K5N8			
Thomas Clarke's		35 O'Connell Street Upper, Rotunda, Dublin, D01 K2X5			
Toddy's Bar		23 O'Connell Street Upper, North City, Dublin, D01 C3W7			
TP Smith's Bar and Restaurant		9-10, Jervis Street, North City, Dublin 1, D01 XV66			
Underdog		199 King Street North, Rotunda, Dublin 1, D07 PR5X			
Urban Brewing		CHQ Building, Custom House Quay, IFSC, Dublin, D01 Y6P5			
W. Plunket Pub & Restaurant		52 Middle Abbey St, North City, Dublin, D01 W9H6			
Wigwam		54 Middle Abbey St, North City, Dublin, D01 E2X4			
10 Fleet Street Restaurant & Bar		9 Fleet St, Temple Bar, Dublin, D02 AT86			
37 Dawson Street Bar		37 Dawson St, Dublin 2, D02 W220			
3Olympia Theatre		3Olympia Theatre, 72 Dame St, Temple Bar, Dublin 2, D02 K135			
4 Dame Lane		4 Dame Ln, Dublin 2, D02 YD79			
9 Below		9 St Stephen's Green, Dublin, D02 C891			
Against The Grain		Galway Brewery, 11 Wexford St, Dublin, D02 HY84			
Anne's Bar & Hardware		10 Essex St E, Temple Bar, Dublin, D02 TF24			
Anseo		18 Camden Street Lower, Saint Kevin's, Dublin 2, D02 WK72			
Bad Ass Café		9-11 Crown Alley, Temple Bar, Dublin			
Bad Bobs		35-37 Essex St E, Temple Bar, Dublin 2, D02 Y891			
Balfes		2 Balfe St, Dublin 2			
Bar Rua		Galway Bay Brewery, 32 Clarendon St, Dublin 2, D02 HX66			
Bartley's Bar and Restaurant		31/32 Stephen Street Lower, Dublin 2, D02 WV05			
Bewley's Grafton Street		78-79, Grafton Street, Dublin, D02 K033			
Bison Bar & BBQ		11 Wellington Quay, Temple Bar, Dublin Southside, Co. Dublin, D02 XY28			
Bonsai Bar		17 South Great George's Street, Dublin 2, D02 HD76			
Bootleg		Drury Court, 58 Drury St, Dublin 2, D02 HT29			
Bow Lane Social Club		17 Aungier St, Dublin 2, D02 XF38			
Bowe's Lounge Bar		31 Fleet St, Dublin 2, D02 DF77			
BrewDog		Three Locks Square, 4, Grand Canal Dock, Dublin 2, D02 E5R7			
Brogans		75 Dame Street, 75 Dame St, Temple Bar, Dublin 2			
Buskers on the Ball		13 - 17 Fleet St, Temple Bar, Dublin, D02 WD51			
C Central Bar & Bistro		34 Camden Street Upper, Saint Kevin's, Dublin, D02 TX06			
Café 1920		10 Westmoreland St, Temple Bar, Dublin, D02 CD45			
Café en Seine		40 Dawson St, Dublin			
Camden Bites and Brews		9 Camden Street Lower, Saint Kevin's, Dublin, D02 FX67			
Camden Recording Studios		67 Pleasants Pl, Saint Kevin's, Dublin 8, D08 XD21			
Captain America's		44 Grafton Street, Dublin, D02 CA21			
Caribou		30 Stephen Street Lower, Dublin 2, D02 XY61			
Cassidy’s Of Camden Street		42 Camden Street Lower, Saint Kevin's, Dublin 2, D02 YP57			
Cassidy's		27 Westmoreland St, Dublin, D02 PX77			
Celler 22		22 St Stephen's Green, Dublin 2, D02 HW54			
Chaplin's		1-2 Hawkins St, Dublin 2, D02 K590			
Charlemont Bar & Bistro		Hilton Hotel, Charlemont Pl, Saint Kevin's, Dublin, D02 A893			
Chequer Lane by Jamie Oliver		27 Exchequer St, Dublin, D02 A527, Ireland			
Ciss Maddens		46 Drury St, Dublin, D02 E128			
Club Chonradh na Gaeilge		6 Harcourt St, Dublin 2, D02 VH98			
Copper Face Jacks		29-30, Harcourt St, Saint Kevin's, Dublin 2, D02 XV58			
Crowbar		2 Temple Ln S, Temple Bar, Dublin, D02 KW24			
D Two Bar		The Harcourt Hotel, 60 Harcourt St, Saint Kevin's, Dublin 2, D02 P902			
Dakota		8/9 William St S, Dublin 2, D02 ND76			
Darkey Kelly's		19 Fishamble St, Christchurch Pl, Temple Bar, Dublin 8, D08 PD8W			
Devitt's		78 Camden Street Lower, Saint Kevin's, Dublin 2, D02 C642			
Dicey's Garden		21-25 Harcourt St, Saint Kevin's, Dublin 2, D02 YF24			
Disndat		3 Dame Ct, Dublin 2, D02 TW84			
Dockers		5 Sir John Rogerson's Quay, Dublin 2, D02 P3C6			
Doyle's		9 College St, Dublin 2, D02 WN62			
Drury Buildings		52-55 Drury St, Dublin 2			
El Silencio		4 Clarendon Market, Dublin 2, D02 AV84			
Fade Street Social Restaurant & Cocktail Bar		6 Fade St, Dublin 2, D02 NF77			
Farrier & Draper		Unit 1, 24, 24a, Powerscourt Townhouse Centre, 59 William St S, Dublin			
Fitzgerald's Bar		22 Aston Quay, Temple Bar, Dublin 2, D02 FH28			
Fitzsimon's Temple Bar		21/22, Wellington Quay, Temple Bar, Dublin			
Flannery's Bar		6 Camden Street Lower, Saint Kevin's, Dublin 2, D02 TP83			
Foggy Dew		1 Fownes St Upper, Temple Bar, Dublin 2, D02 WP21			
Grogan's		15 William St S, Dublin 2, D02 H336			
Hang Dai Chinese		20 Camden Street Lower, Saint Kevin's, Dublin, D02 T275			
Happy's Bar & Street Food		Unit 3, 14-18 Aston Quay, Temple Bar, Dublin 2, D02 FV38			
Harcourt Bar & Garden Lounge		60 Harcourt St, Saint Kevin's, Dublin 2, D02 P902			
Hard Rock Café		12 Fleet St, Temple Bar, Dublin, D02 NW56			
Harry's on the Green		2 King St S, Dublin, D02 FW59			
Hartigan's		100 Leeson Street Lower, Dublin 2, D02 W023			
Harty's Pub		44 Nassau St, Dublin, D02 YY44			
Hawksmoor Dublin		34 College Green, Dublin 2, D02 C850			
Hogans		36 South Great George's Street, Dublin 2, D02 T328			
House Dublin		27 Leeson Street Lower, Saint Kevin's, Dublin 2			
Huck's		8a Camden Pl, Saint Kevin's, Dublin, D02 NW60			
Hyde Dublin		9 Lemon St, Dublin 2			
Idlewild Bar		14 Fade St, Dublin 2, D02 HH33			
Irish Whiskey Museum		119 Grafton Street, Dublin, D02 E620			
Izakaya Bar		13 South Great George's Street, Dublin 2, D02 RD36			
J. O'Connell		29 Richmond St S, Saint Kevin's, Dublin 2, D02 WV30			
J.T. Pim's		4 South Great George's Street, Dublin 2, D02 NR59			
Jimmy Rabbitte's		84-87 Camden Street Lower, d2, Dublin, D02 DH36			
John O’Dwyer’s The Lucky Duck		43 Aungier St, Dublin 2, D02 KP08			
Johnny Rush's		65 William St S, Dublin 2, D02 TH24			
JR Mahon's		1-2, Burgh Quay, Dublin 2, D02 F243			
Keavan's Port - JD Wetherspoon		1, 5 Camden Street Upper, Saint Kevin's, Dublin, D02			
Kehoe's		9 Anne St S, Dublin, D02 NY88			
Kennedy's Pub & Restaurant		30-32 Westland Row, Dublin 2, D02 DP70			
Lemon & Duke		Royal Hibernian Way, 1 Duke Ln, Upper, Dublin, D02 YK71			
Lemuel's		The Conrad, Top Floor, Earlsfort Terrace, Saint Kevin's, Dublin			
Lennan's Yard - Pub, Bar & Restaurant		21a Dawson St, Dublin			
Lord Mayor's Bar		Lord Mansion House, Dawson St, Dublin 2			
Lundy's Foot		Lundy Foot's Bar and Restaurant, Essex Gate, D2, Dublin			Formerly The Czech Inn, and Isolde's Tower.
Madigan's Pub		104-105 Leeson Street Lower, Dublin 2, D02 K710			
Maher's Pub		43 Baggot Street Lower, Dublin 2, D02 YC83			
Marlin Hotel Bar		11 Bow Ln E, St Stephen's Green, Dublin, D02 AY81			
Mary's Bar & Hardware		8 Wicklow St, Dublin 2, D02 AX90			
Matt The Thresher		31-32 Pembroke Street Lower, Dublin 2, D02 Y523			
McCaffertys at the Barge		42 Charlemont St, Ranelagh, Dublin 2, D02 R593			
McGrattan's Pub		76 Fitzwilliam Ln, Dublin 2			
Moss Lane		37B Pearse St, Dublin 2, D02 N966			
Mulligan and Haines		32 Dame St, Dublin 2, D02 EA24			
Neary's Bar		1 Chatham St, Dublin, D02 EW93			
No. 27 Bar & Lounge		27 St Stephen's Green, Dublin 2			
Nolita		64 South Great George's Street, Dublin			
O'Connor's of Mount Street		32 Mount Street Lower, Dublin 2			
Ohana		17 Harcourt St, Saint Kevin's, Dublin, D02 W963			
O'Regan's		26-27 South Great George's Street, Dublin 2, D02 A395			
O'Reilly's Bar		Tara Street Station, Poolbeg St, Dublin 2			
Padraig Pearse		130 Pearse Street Dublin 2, Erne Street Lower, Dublin Southside, Dublin			
Peadar Kearney'		64 Dame St, Temple Bar, Dublin, D02 RT72			
Peruke & Periwig		31 Dawson St, Dublin 2, D02 DR58			
Pillar Bar		25 Westmoreland St, Dublin, D02 XP95			
Portobello Bar		The Portobello Hotel, 33 Richmond St S, Saint Kevin's, Dublin 2, D02 CF40			
Pygmalion Public House & Café		59 William St S, Dublin			
R.I.O.T. Bar		4 Aston Quay, Temple Bar, Dublin, D02 VP93			
Reilly's		17 Merrion St Upper, Dublin, D02 WV59			
River Bar		1 Burgh Quay, Dublin 2, D02 F243			
Rooftop Bar and Terrace		Markar Hotel, Grand Canal Quay, Docklands, Dublin, D02 CK38			
Ryan's		Camden Street Lower, Saint Kevin's, Dublin 2, D02 KT51			
Shanahan's on the Green		119 St Stephen's Green, Dublin, D02 E894			
Sheehan's Pub		17 Chatham St, Dublin 2, D02 X923			
Sinnott's		King St S, Dublin			
Sitting Room at Delahunt		39 Camden Street Lower, Saint Kevin's, Dublin, D02 K277			
Sophie's Rooftop		The Dean Hotel, 33 Harcourt St, Saint Kevin's, Dublin			
Street 66		33-34 Parliament St, Temple Bar, Dublin 2			
Swan Bar		58 York St, Dublin, D02 RW67			
Tapped Late Bar		47 Nassau St, Dublin, D02 RP20			
Teach na Céibhe		10-12 Temple Bar, Dublin 2, D02 EW63			
Temple Bar Inn		40-47 Fleet St, Temple Bar, Dublin 2, D02 NX25			
TGI Friday's Fleet Street		11-12 Westmoreland St, Temple Bar, Dublin, D02 XE29			
The Auld Dubliner		24 - 25 Temple Bar, Dublin			
The Bank on College Green		20-22 College Green, Dublin 2, D02 C868			
The Bankers Bar		Ard Finnan House, Trinity St, Dublin 2, D02 A440			
The Bar		Shopping Centre, Unit B1B, St Stephen's Green, Dublin, D02 PC04			
The Bar With No Name		Fadebrook House, 3 Fade St, Dublin 2, D02 NF77			
The Beer Temple		Galway Bay Brewery, 1 Parliament St, Temple Bar, Dublin, D02 AN28			
The Black Door		58 Harcourt St, Saint Kevin's, Dublin, D02 KA99			
The Blind Pig Speakeasy		18 Suffolk St, Dublin 2, D02 NP97			
The Botanical Garden Bar		13-14, Liberty Ln, Portobello, Dublin 8, D08 NF86			
The Bull and Castle		FX Buckley Steak House, 5-7 Lord Edward St, Dublin 2, D02 P634			
The Button Factory		Curved St, Temple Bar, Dublin			
The Camden		84, Camden Street Lower, Saint Kevin's, Dublin 2, D02 DH36			
The Capitol Lounge		1 Aungier St, Dublin 2, D02 HF72			
The Cellar Bar		The Merrion Hotel, 21 Merrion St Upper, Dublin 2, D02 KF79			
The Chelsea Drugstore		25 South Great George's Street, Dublin 2, D02 XY71			
The Crafty Fox		37-38 Camden Row, Portobello, Dublin 8, D08 T6N3			
The Dame Tavern		18 Dame Ct, Dublin 2, D02 W683			
The Dean Bar		The Dean Hotel, 33 Harcourt St, Saint Kevin's, Dublin			
The DL Bar and Restaurant		6 Crow St, Temple Bar, Dublin, D02 XV00			
The Giddy Dolphin Pub		2-5 Wellington Quay, Temple Bar, Dublin 2, D02 PK72			
The Ginger Man		39-40 Fenian St, Dublin 2, D02 KD51			
The Green Hen		33 Exchequer St, Dublin 2, D02 A620			
The Hairy Lemon		Stephen Street Lower, Dublin 2			
The Ha'penny Bridge Inn		42 Wellington Quay, Temple Bar, Dublin 2, D02 Y103			
The Horseshoe Bar		27 St Stephen's Green, Dublin 2			
The Jar		31 Wexford St, Portobello, Dublin 2, D02 K232			
The Landmark		1 Kevin Street Lower, Portobello, Dublin, D08 DX2A			
The Leinster Hotel Bar		7 Mount Street Lower, Dublin 2, D02 WK33			
The Lincoln's Inn		19 Lincoln Pl, Dublin			
The Little Pig Speakeasy, Dublin		Glendenning Lane, Wicklow St, 6, Dublin, D02 NP97			
The Lombard		44 Pearse St, Dublin, D02 PX31			
The Lord Mayor's Lounge		27 St Stephen's Green, Dublin 2, D02 K224			
The Marker Hotel (Roof Bar)		Grand Canal Square, Docklands, Dublin			
The Market Bar		14a Fade St, Dublin 2, D02 A368			
The Merrion Hotel Bar		Merrion St Upper, Dublin 2			
The Mint Bar					
The Norsemen		28E, Essex St E, Temple Bar, Dublin 2			
The Oak		1-3 Parliament St, Temple Bar, Dublin 2, D02 AN28			
The Odeon Bar and Grill		57 Harcourt St, Saint Kevin's, Dublin 2, D02 VE22			
The Old Stand		37 Exchequer St, Dublin 2, D02 F251			
The Old Storehouse Bar & Restaurant		3 Crown Alley, Temple Bar, Dublin, D02 CX67			
The Pavilion		Trinity College - Green, South-East Inner City, Dublin			
The Pawn Shop Bar		15 Dame St, Dublin 2, D02 KD74			
The Quays		10-12 Temple Bar, Dublin 2, D02 EW63			
The Rag Trader		39 Drury St, Dublin			
The Roof Garden Temple Bar		Fitzsimons Temple Bar, 16 to 18, Essex St E, Dublin 2			
The Sidecar		The Westbury, Balfe St, Dublin			
The Sin Bin		1-4 Merrion Street Lower, Dublin, D02 H525			
The Snug		15 Stephen Street Upper, Dublin 8, D08 ADW4			
The South Strand - JD Wetherspoon		1 Hanover Quay, Grand Canal Dock, Dublin			
The Square Ball		45 Hogan Pl, Dublin, D02 RF34			
The Storyteller		9 Grand Canal Street Lower, Dublin 2, D02 XD98			
The Sugar Club		8 Leeson Street Lower, Saint Kevin's, Dublin, D02 ET97			
The Well		133 St Stephen's Green, Dublin 2, D02 K597			
The Whiskey Reserve - Whiskey Tasting Dublin		17/18 Temple Ln S, Temple Bar, Dublin,			
The Wild Duck Dublin		17/20 Sycamore St, Temple Bar, Dublin			
The Windjammer		111 Townsend St, Dublin 2, D02 TX96			
The Workman's Club		10 Wellington Quay, Temple Bar, Dublin, D02 VX36			
The Workshop Pub		George's Quay, Dublin			
Thomas Moore Inn		12 Aungier St, Dublin 2, D02 CR90			
Thunder Road Café		52-57, Fleet St, Temple Bar, Dublin 2, D02 A375			
Trinity Bar and Venue		46-49 Dame St, Dublin Southside, Dublin, D02 X466			
Trinity Capital Hotel Bar		Trinity Capital Hotel, Pearse St, Dublin 2, D02 FW96			
Tucker Reillys		72-73 Camden Street Lower, Saint Kevin's, Dublin 2, D02 E092			
Turk's Head		6-8 Turk's Head Yard, Leeds LS1 6HB, United Kingdom			
Twenty Two Night Club		22 Anne St S, Dublin, D02 CH94			
Ukiyo Bar		7-9 Exchequer St, Dublin 2, D02 P998			
Vat House Bar		2 Anglesea St, Temple Bar, Dublin 2			
Vertigo Bar		Clayton Hotel Cardiff Lane, Sir John Rogerson's Quay, Dublin Docklands, Dublin			
Vintage Cocktail Club		15 Crown Alley, Temple Bar, Dublin 2, D02 E229			
Zozimus		Centenary House, Anne's Ln, Anne St S, Dublin, D02 AK30			
Annesley House		70 N Strand Rd, North Strand, Dublin, D03 K8P4			
Clonliffe House		43 Ballybough Rd, Dublin 3, D03 VE24			
Clontarf Castle Hotel		Castle Ave, Clontarf East, Dublin 3, D03 W5NO			
Connolly's The Sheds		198 Clontarf Rd, Clontarf, Dublin 3, D03 Y974			
Croke Park		Jones' Rd, Drumcondra, Dublin 3			
Cusack's Pub		145 N Strand Rd, North Strand, Dublin 3, D03 P043			
Gaffney's Pub		5 Fairview Strand, Clontarf West, Dublin, D03 W5H0			
Grainger's Pebble Beach		18 Conquer Hill Rd, Clontarf East, Dublin, D03 DC97			
Harry Byrnes Pub		107 Howth Rd, Clontarf West, Dublin 3, D03 KN97			
Kavanaghs Marino House		16 Malahide Rd, Clontarf West, Dublin 3, D03 V066			
Knights Bar		Clontarf Castle, Castle Ave, Clontarf East, Dublin 3, D03 W5N0			
Meaghers Pub		277 Richmond Rd, Drumcondra, Dublin, D03 EE95			
The 1884		74 Malahide Rd, Marino, Dublin 3, D03 XW54			
The Beachcomber		179 Howth Rd, Clontarf East, Killester, Co. Dublin, D03 R892			
The Ref Pub		70 Ballybough Rd (& Kings Ave), Dublin			
The Seabank House		123 E Wall Rd, East Wall, Dublin 3, D03 K6X5			
The Strand House		12 Fairview, Dublin 3, D03 C998			
The Yacht Bar and Restaurant		73 Clontarf Rd, Clontarf East, Dublin 3, D03 EP93			
Al Boshetto		2 Merrion Rd, Ballsbridge, Dublin 4, D04 F2R2			
Arthur Mayne's Donnybrook		48 Donnybrook Rd, Dublin 4, D04 TR26			
Aviva Stadium		Lansdowne Rd, Dublin 4			
B Bar		Clayton Hotel, Leeson Street Upper, Dublin, D04 A318			
Bar Eile		1 Baggot Street Upper, Ballsbridge, Dublin 4, D04 WN52			
Bloom Brasserie		11 Baggot Street Upper, Dublin, D04 HN92			
Charlotte Quay		Dublin 4			
Crowes Pub		10 Merrion Rd, Ballsbridge, Dublin 4			
Grandstand Bar		Clayton Hotel, 4 Merrion Rd, Ballsbridge, Dublin, D04 R7X2			
Hampton hotel bar & bistro		19 Morehampton Rd, Ranelagh, Dublin 4, D04 Y6K4			
Herbert Park Hotel Bar and Terrace lounge		Ballsbridge Terrace, Ballsbridge, Dublin 4, D04 R2T2			
Horse Show House		34-36 Merrion Rd, Ballsbridge, Dublin 4, D04 C535			
Intercontinental Whiskey Bar		Simmonscourt Rd, Dublin, D04 A9K8			
Irishtown Housse		60 A Irishtown Rd, Dublin 4, D04 Y9P3			
John Clarke & Sons South Dock		14 R802, 12 Bridge St, Dublin Southside, Co. Dublin, D04 EH30			
M. O'Briens		8-9, Sussex Terrace, Dublin 4, D04 KN82			
Mary Mac's		12 Merrion Rd, Dublin 4			
McCloskey's		83 Morehampton Rd, Dublin 4			
Mulligan's of Sandymount		86 Sandymount Rd, Dublin, D04 H3A4			
One Ballsbridge Bar and Restaurant		New Pembroke Street North, Dublin 4			
O'Reilly's of Sandymount		5 Seafort Ave, Dublin 4, D04 N840			
Paddy Cullens		14 Merrion Rd, Ballsbridge, Dublin 4, D04 T3Y7			
Roly's Bistro , Cocktail & Wine Bar		7 Ballsbridge Terrace, Dublin, D04 DT78			
Ryan's Beggars Bush		115 Haddington Rd, Dublin, D04 H328			
Sandymount House		1 Sandymount Green, Dublin 4, D04 PD83			
Searsons		42-44 Baggot Street Upper, Dublin 4, D04 V210			
Smyth's of Haddington Road		10 Haddington Rd, Dublin, D04 FC63			
The 51 Bar		51 Haddington Rd, Dublin 4, D04 FD83			
The Bath Pub		26 Bath Ave, Dublin 4, D04 X7P8			
The Bridge 1859		13 Ballsbridge Terrace, Dublin 4, D04 C7K6			
The Cow -Pub & Kitchen		2 Shelbourne Rd, Dublin 4, D04 V4K0			
The Den Bar		Lansdowne Hotel, 33 Pembroke Rd, Ballsbridge, Dublin, D04 A9K0			
The Line Out Bar		Sandymount Hotel,Herbert Road, Dublin, D04 VN88			
The Merrion Inn		188 Merrion Rd, Dublin 4, D04 Y512			
The Merry Cobbler		78-82, 78-82 Irishtown Rd, Dublin 4			
The Morehampton		135 Morehampton Rd, Donnybrook, Dublin, D04 HX46			
The Oarsman		8-10, Bridge St, Dublin 4, D04 N294			
The Old Spot		14 Bath Ave, Dublin 4, D04 Y726			
The Ruby Room		Dylan Hotel, Eastmoreland Pl, Dublin			
The Schoolhouse		2-8, Northumberland Rd, Ballsbridge, Dublin 4, D04 P5W8			
The Terrace Bar		The Mespil Hotel, 50-60 Mespil Rd, Dublin 4, D04 E7N2			
The Vintage Inn		74 Irishtown Rd, Dublin 4, D04 Y230			
The Waterbank Gastro Bar		Grand Canal Street Upper, Dublin 4, D04 X5X7			
The Waterloo Bar		36 Baggot Street Upper, Dublin 4, D04 R6Y6			
The Yacht		8 Thorncastle St, Dublin, D04 DR50			
Blackbanks Bar & Grill		5 Greendale Rd, Raheny - Foxfield, Dublin			
Cedar Lounge		76 St Assam's Park, Raheny - St. Assam, Dublin 5, D05 RX45			
Hope Beer & Brewery		Kilbarrack Road, Kilbarrack, Dublin, D05 H2K2			
Horse and Hound		Brookwood Rise, Harmonstown, Dublin 5, D05 H049			
Kyle's Pub		Eastland House, Malahide Road, Dublin			
Madigans		Swan's Nest Rd, Donaghmede, Dublin, D05 Y337			
The Ardlea Inn		Maryfield Ave (& Ardlea), Beaumont, Dublin			
The Cock & Bull		Main St, Coolock Village Cl, Kilmore, Dublin 5, D05 AE73			
The Concord (aka The Green Fields)		Edenmore Park, Edenmore, Dublin			
The Goblet		Malahide Rd, Beaumont, Artane, Dublin 5			
The Manhattan Beer & Food		3-5, Station Rd, Raheny - St. Assam, Dublin 5, D05 T9K8			
The Raheny Inn		7A Main St, Raheny - St. Assam, Raheny, Co. Dublin, D05 PH27			
The Ramble Inn		145 Killester Ave, Clontarf West, Dublin, D05 W827			
The Roundabout		2 Ardcollum Ave, Beaumont, Dublin 5, D05 XW88			
The Watermill		411 Howth Rd, Clontarf East, Dublin 5, D05 Y1E5			
Americana Cocktail Bar		117-119 Ranelagh, Dublin 6, D06 WY50			
Ashton's Gastro Pub		11 Vergemount, Bóthar Chluain Sceach, Rathmines, Dublin, D06 X271			
Birchalls of Ranelagh		Ranelagh Rd, Ranelagh, Dublin			
Blackbird					
Bottlers Bank		6 Terenure Rd E, Terenure, Dublin 6, D06 W3K0			
Corrigans		27 Mountpleasant Ave Lower, Rathmines, Dublin			
Barmer Frowns Clonskeagh		68 Clonskeagh Rd, Rathmines, Dublin, D06 EH93			
Firebyrd		51 Ranelagh, Dublin 6, D06 K7W3			
Graces		2 Rathgar Rd, Rathmines, Dublin 6, D06 E021			
Kodiak, Rathmines		304 Rathmines Rd Lower, Rathmines, Dublin, D06 W3Y1			
Layla's Rooftop		The Devlin, 117 Ranelagh, Dublin, D06 R3N0			
Martin B. Slattery		217 Rathmines Rd Lower, Rathmines, Dublin 6, D06 XE36			
Mother Reilly's Bar & Restaurant		32 Rathmines Rd Upper, Rathmines, Dublin 6, D06 H5Y4			
Murphy's Gastro Pub Restaurant of Rathmines		93-95 Rathmines Rd Upper, Rathmines, Dublin, D06 H3E9			
R. McSorley's		5 Sandford Rd, Ranelagh, Dublin 6, D06 A2P4			
Rody Boland's		12-14 Rathmines Rd Upper, Rathmines, Dublin, D06 E1E8			
Smyth's Pub		6 R117, Ranelagh, Dublin			
Stella's Cocktail Club		207 Rathmines Rd Lower, Rathmines, Dublin 6, D06 W403			
TapHouse Bar & Kitchen		60 Ranelagh, Dublin 6, D06 C9C6			
The Dropping Well		Classon’s Bridge, Rathmines, Milltown, Co. Dublin, D06 YK38			
The Rathgar 108		108 Rathgar Rd, Dublin 6, D06 F6H9			
Bradys Pub - Apetito Tapas & Wine Restaurant		5-9 Terenure Pl, Terenure, Dublin 6W, Co. Dublin, D6W TX40			
KCR House Pub		326 Kimmage Rd Lower, Kimmage, Terenure, Dublin 6W, Co. Dublin, D6W CF38			
Lyster's Bar		236, 238 Harold's Cross Rd, Harold's Cross, Terenure, Dublin 6W, Co. Dublin, D6W RF44			
McGowan's of Harolds Cross		174 Harold's Cross Rd, Harold's Cross, Terenure, Dublin, D6W XY61			
Peggy Kelly's		161 Harold's Cross Rd, Harold's Cross, Dublin			
The Morgue		Templeogue Rd, Terenure, Dublin 6w, Co. Dublin, D6W HH79			
The Terenure Inn		94 - 96 Terenure Rd N, Terenure, Dublin 6			
The Two Sisters		Terenure, Dublin 6W, Co. Dublin			
Vaughan's Eagle House, Terenure		105, 107 Terenure Rd N, Dublin, D6W XN76			
Bar 1661		1-5 Green St, Rotunda, Dublin, D07 YT6H			
Bonobo, Smithfield		119 Church Street Upper, Inns Quay, Dublin 7, D07 E128			
Breffni Inn		27 Ashtown Grove, Ashtown, Dublin, D07 C7KA			
Clarke' City Arms		55 Prussia St, Stoneybatter, Dublin, D07 PA66			
Clarkes		36 Phibsborough Rd, Phibsborough, Dublin 7, D07 VY01			
Cumiskeys		41 Dominick Street Upper, Phibsborough, Dublin 7, D07 X923			
Cumiskeys Bar and Restaurant		463 Blackhorse Ave, Ashtown, Dublin 7			
Delaney's Smithfield		83 King St N, Smithfield, Dublin 7, D07 PF51			
Downey's Bar		89 New, Cabra Rd, Dublin 7, D07 A025			
Doyle's Corner		160/161 Phibsborough Rd, Phibsborough, Dublin 7, D07 R26N			
E. McGrath’s Public House		30 Faussagh Ave, Cabra West, Dublin, 7			
Fidelity Bar		79 Queen St, Smithfield, Dublin 7, D07 DW3R			
Frank Ryan's		5 Queen St, Smithfield, Dublin 7, D07 T227			
Gen Bar / Shuffle Board Bar		Smithfield, Dublin, D07 F2VF			
Grainger's Hanlon Corner		189 N Circular Rd, Cabra East, Dublin, D07 KW3P			
Hacienda Market Bar		15 Mary Street Little, North City, Dublin 7, D07 AK73			
Hole in the Wall		lackhorse Ave, Phoenix Park, Castleknock (part of Phoenix Park), Dublin 7, D07 V663			
Hyne's Bar		Prussia St, Stoneybatter, Dublin, D07 E1RD			
Jameson Distillery Bar		Bow St, Smithfield, Dublin 7, D07 N9VH			
Kavanaghs Pub		1 Aughrim St, 7, Stoneybatter, Dublin, D07 V403			
L. Mulligan Grocer		18 Stoneybatter, Dublin 7, D07 KN77			
McGettigans Bar		78 Queen St, Arran Quay, Smithfield, Dublin 7, D07 PW67			
McGowans of Phibsboro		18 Phibsborough Rd, Phibsborough, Dublin 7, D07 A562			
Nanny O Shea's (aka The Berkeley)		Wellington St. Lower, Phibsborough, Dublin			
Phibsborough House		36 Phibsborough Rd, Phibsborough, Dublin 7, D07 VY01			
Sin é Dublin		15 Ormond Quay Upper, North City, Dublin, D07 YK6A			
The Back Page		199 Phibsborough Rd, Phibsborough, Dublin 7, D07 A0X2			
The Bald Eagle Beer & Food co.		114-115 Phibsborough Rd, Phibsborough, Dublin, D07 VX23			
The Barbers Bar		19 Lower Grangegorman Luas Stop, Stoneybatter, Dublin, D07 H583			
The Belfry Stoneybatter		37 Stoneybatter, Dublin, D07 X029			
The Bohemian Pub (McGeough's)		66 Phibsborough Rd, Phibsborough, Dublin 7, D07 P592			
The Glimmer Man		14 Stoneybatter, Dublin, D07 RK37			
The Halfway House		Navan Rd, Ashtown, Dublin			
The Homestead Bar / Fitzgerald’s		50 Quarry Rd, Cabra East, Dublin 7, D07 WD37			
The Hut		159 Phibsborough Rd, Phibsborough, Dublin, D07 HA21			
The Legal Eagle		1-2 Chancery Pl, Inns Quay, Dublin 1, D07 HP40			
Walsh's		6 Stoneybatter, Dublin 7, D07 A382			
57 The Headline		56-57 Clanbrassil Street Lower, Dublin 8, D08 HC79			
All My Friends		61-63 Meath St, The Liberties, Dublin 8, D08 P4V2			
Anti Social Bar Dublin		101 Francis St, The Liberties, Dublin, D08 FHP9			
Arthur's Pub		28 Thomas Street, The Liberties, Dublin, D08 VF83			
Bang Bang Bar		Teeling Whiskey Distillery, 13-17 Newmarket, The Liberties, Dublin 8, D08 KD91			
Black Lion Inn		207A Emmet Rd, Inchicore, Dublin, D08 PN20			
Board/MVP		29 Clanbrassil Street Upper, Harold's Cross, Dublin 8, D08 E1X9			
Broyage		Hilton, S Circular Rd, Kilmainham, Dublin, D08 XAK3			
Cooper's Corner		Bow Bridge, Saint James, Dublin, D08 RY68			
Dillons Bar Parkgate Street		Parkgate Street Post Office, 36 Parkgate St, Arran Quay, Dublin 8, 8			
Doll Society		101 Francis St, The Liberties, Dublin 8, D08 Y70F			
Dudley's		48 Thomas St, The Liberties, Dublin, D08 Y44A			
DV8 Bar & Venue		131 James St, Saint James, Dublin, D08 HH96			
Guinness Open Gate Brewery		53 James St, St. James's Gate, Dublin 8			
Guinness Storehouse - Gravity Bar		St. James's Gate, Dublin 8, D08 VF8H			
Harkins The Harbour Bar		The Old Harbour, 6 Echlin St, Ushers, Dublin 8, D08 HX3K			
Harold House		34-35 Clanbrassil Street Upper, Portobello, Dublin, D08 FY00			
Jackie's		40 Francis St, The Liberties, Dublin 8, D08 W208			
John Fallon's "The Capstan Bar"		129 The Coombe, The Liberties, Dublin 8, D08 NP52			
Kavanaghs Pub New Street		35 New St S, Portobello, Dublin 8, D08 V972			
Kenny's Bar		174 James St, Saint James, Dublin, D08 CY51			
Love Tempo		110 Thomas St, Usher's Quay, Dublin 8, D08 C2W7			
Lowes Pub		27 Dolphin's Barn St, Saint James, Dublin 8			
Lucky's		78 Meath St, The Liberties, Dublin 8, D08 A318			
McDowells Pub		139 Emmet Rd, Inchicore, Dublin, D08 V882			
Morrisseys Pub Dublin		80-81 Cork St, Co, Dublin 8, D08 E84W			
Nancy Hands		30-32 Parkgate St, Stoneybatter, Dublin 8, D08 W6X3			
Old Royal Oak		11 Kilmainham Ln, Saint James, Dublin			
O'Shea's Merchant		12a Lower Bridge St, The Liberties, Dublin, D08 Y271			
P. Duggan's		25 Parkgate St, Stoneybatter, Dublin 8, D08 XR94			
Peadar Browns		1A Clanbrassil Street Lower, Merchants Quay, Dublin, D08 YK26			
Pearse Lyons Whiskey Distillery		121-122, James St, The Liberties, Dublin, D08 ET27			
Pilsner Pub		41 Usher's Quay, Dublin, D08 K1E8			
Rascals Brewing Company		Goldenbridge Estate, Tyrconnell Rd, Inchicore, Dublin, D08 HF68			
Ryan's of Parkgate Street		28 Parkgate St, Stoneybatter, Dublin 8, D08 CH93			
Slatt's		126A Tyrconnell Park, Inchicore, Dublin 8, D08 E296			
Spitalfields		25 The Coombe, Merchants Quay, Dublin 8, D08 YV07			
Stillgarden Distillery		Goldenbridge Industrial Estate, Tyrconnell Rd, Inchicore, Dublin 8, D08 EWK2			
Swift		131 Thomas St, The Liberties, Dublin, D08 P8H3			
Tenters Gastro Pub		Mill St, Dublin			
The Barn House		Dolphin's Barn, Saint James, Dublin 8	Closed circa January 2025		
The Bird Flanagan		471 S Circular Rd, Rialto, Dublin 8			
The Christchurch Inn		13 High St, Merchants Quay, Dublin 8, D08 K092			
The Circular & The Other Hand		536-538 S Circular Rd, Rialto, Dublin 8, D08 CC02			
The Clock		110 Thomas St, Usher's Quay, Dublin 8, D08 C2W7			
The Devils Cut		118 Emmet Rd, Inchicore, Dublin, D08 E086			
The Fourth Corner		Patrick Street Patrick St, Dublin 8, D08 AR29			
The Galway Hooker Bar		Heuston Station, St John's Rd W, Saint James, Dublin 8			
The Glen of Aherlow		29 Emmet Rd, Inchicore, Dublin 8, D08 CK70			
The Grattan		8 Grattan Cres, Inchicore, Dublin, D08 V670			
The Iveagh Lounge		The Ashling Hotel, 10 - 13 Parkgate St, Stoneybatter, Dublin 8, D08 P38N			
The Lark Inn		80-81 Meath St, Merchants Quay, Dublin, D08 A2C7			
The Liberty Belle		33 Francis St, The Liberties, Dublin 8, D08 A9T3			
The Lower Deck		3 Portobello Harbour, Portobello, Dublin			
The Malt House		27 James's Street, The Liberties, Dublin, D08 EP89			
The National Stadium		145 S Circular Rd, Dublin, D08 HY40			
The Patriot's Inn		760 S Circular Rd, Kilmainham, Dublin, D08 HV0A			
The Powerhouse Bar		Roe & Co Distillery, 92 James St, The Liberties, Dublin 8, D08 YYW9			
The Saint Public House		Inchicore Dublin 1 St Vincent St W, Inchicore, Dublin 8, D08 WT0A			
Thomas House		86 Thomas St, The Liberties, Dublin			
Tom Kennedy's Lounge		65 Thomas St, The Liberties, Dublin, D08 VOR1			
Urban8		740 S Circular Rd, Kilmainham, Dublin, D08 W257			
Vicar Street		58-59, Thomas St, The Liberties, Dublin 8			
Beaumont House		1 Shantalla Rd, Beaumont, Dublin, D09 F6N1			
Botanic House Restaurant		26 Botanic Rd, Glasnevin , Co. Dublin, D09 AK26			
Cat and Cage		74 Drumcondra Rd Upper, Drumcondra, Dublin, D09 X620			
Hedigan's The Brian Boru		5 Prospect Rd, Glasnevin, Dublin, D09 PP93			
John Kavanagh The Gravediggers		1 Prospect Square, Glasnevin, Dublin, D09 CF72			
Kennedy's Pub		132-134 Drumcondra Rd Lower, Drumcondra, Dublin 9, D09 A4P8			
Kilmardinny Inn		Lorcan Ave, Whitehall, Dublin, D09 P623			
Kitty Kiernan's		61-63 Collins Ave, Grace Park, Dublin, D09 T8F8			
Mc Graths Pub		Drumcondra Rd Lower, Drumcondra, Dublin, D09 X5P6			
Millmount House		11 Drumcondra Rd Upper, Drumcondra, Dublin 9, D09 E9R3			
The Bernard Shaw		Cross Guns Bridge, Drumcondra, Dublin 9, D09 XW44			
The Comet Woodstone Pizza		243 Swords Rd, Whitehall, Dublin 9, D09 YW35			
The Goose Tavern		22 Sion Hill Rd, Grace Park, Dublin, 9			
The Ivy House Bar & Restaurant		114 Drumcondra Rd Upper, Drumcondra, Dublin, D09 CX74			
The Metzo Lounge		Shangan Rd, Dublin 9			
The Slipper		125 Ballymun Rd, Glasnevin, Dublin 9, D09 V275			
The Tolka House		9a Glasnevin Hill, Glasnevin, Dublin 9, D09 VH02			
The Viscount		89 Swords Rd, Whitehall, Dublin, D09 E1T1			
Chasers		308 Ballyfermot Rd, Drumfinn, Dublin, D10 E985			
Cleary's Inchicore		53 Sarsfield Rd, Kilmainham, Dublin 10, D10 VH57			
County Bar and Lounge		51 Decies Rd, Kilmainham, Dublin 10, D10 KW32			
Downey's		343 Ballyfermot Rd, Ballyfermot Upper, Dublin 10, D10 W932			
O'Shea's		79 Ballyfermot Rd, Cherry Orchard, Dublin			
Ruby Finnegans		1A First Ave, Kilmainham, Dublin 10, D10 H761			
The Manhattan		92 Le Fanu Rd, Drumfinn, Dublin, 10			
Tim Younges		Cherry Orchard, Dublin 10, D10 AX59			
Autobahn Roadhouse		73 Glasnevin Ave, Ballygall, Dublin 11			
Bottom of the Hill (Gleeson's)		112 Finglas Rd, Finglas East, Dublin, D11 F2P6			
Martins Bar		122 Ballygall Rd W, Finglas East, Dublin, D11 TPN7			
O'Riordan's		66 Main St, Finglas East, Dublin, D11 P7FR			
Quarry House		68 Ballygall Rd E, Ballygall, Dublin 11, D11 TY32			
The Abbey Tavern		39 Barry Rd, Finglas North, Dublin			
The Deputy Mayor		St Margaret's Rd, Meakstown, Dublin 11, D11 YY11			
The Full Shilling		66 Main St, Finglas East, Dublin 11, D11 P7FR			
The Shamrock		Lodge Seamus Ennis Road, Finglas, Dublin			
The Village Inn		33 Church St, Finglas South, Dublin, D11 E129			
The Willows		74 Willow Park Cres, Finglas East, Dublin, D11 TP64			
Birchall's Bar & Lounge		1 Bangor Dr, Crumlin, Dublin, D12 Y820			
Eleanora's Bar & Lounge		147 Drimnagh Rd, Walkinstown, Dublin, D12 F6NY			
Floods Lounge		140 Sundrive Rd, Kimmage, Dublin, D12 HE65			
Rory O'Connor's Bar		Ashleaf Shopping Centre, Cromwellsfort Rd, Commons, Dublin 12, D12 R8XD			
The Black Forge Inn		163 Drimnagh Rd, Walkinstown, Dublin, D12 PH32			
The Castle Inn / BarnWell Bar		2 Long Mile Rd, Walkinstown, Dublin 12, D12 PK8H			
The Cherry Tree		Walkinstown Cross, Walkinstown, Dublin 12, D12 EY19			
The Four Provinces Brewery		25 Ravensdale Park, Kimmage, Co. Dublin, D12 X965			
The Gate Bar		155 Crumlin Rd, Drimnagh, Dublin 12, D12 HA27			
The Halfway House		Walkinstown Rd, Walkinstown, Dublin			
The Laurels Perrystown		186 Whitehall Rd W, Perrystown, Dublin 12, D12 V2VY			
The Pines		Whitehall Rd, Perrystown, Dublin			
The Stone Boat		35-37 Sundrive Rd, Kimmage, Harold's Cross, Dublin, D12 PE83			
The Traders Bar & Lounge		Unit 7, Greenhills Shopping Centre, St James's Rd, Limekilnfarm, Dublin, D12 DKN8			
Aqua Restraurant		1 W Pier, Howth, Dublin 13			
Bayside Inn		Bayside Blvd N, Kilbarrack Lower, Dublin			
McNeills of Howth (The Tophouse)		19 Main St, Howth, Dublin			
O'Connells Pub & Restaurant		E Pier, Howth, Dublin			
The Abbey Tavern		28 Abbey St, Howth, Dublin, D13 E9V4			
The Bloody Stream		Howth Railway Station, Howth, Dublin			
The Elphin		36 Baldoyle Rd, Burrow, Dublin, D13 KR26			
The Harbour Bar Howth		18 Church St, Howth, Dublin, D13 V048			
The Jameson Portmarnock		Strand Rd, Portmarnock, Dublin, D13 V2X7			
The Racecourse Inn		Racecourse Shopping Centre, Grange Rd, Baldoyle, Co. Dublin			
The Summit Inn		13 Thormanby Rd, Howth, Dublin 13, D13 XK50			
The White House		12 - 13 Main St, Baldoyle, Dublin 13			
Wright's Findlater Howth		Harbour Rd, Howth, Dublin			
Churchtown Stores		5 Braemor Rd, Newtown Little, Dublin 14, D14 Y0C0			
Dundrum House		57 Main St, Dundrum, Dublin 14			
PYE		Main St, Dundrum, Dublin, D14 V9R3			
The Bottle Tower Beer & Food		1 Beaumont Ave, Churchtown Upper, Dublin 14, D14 E427			
The Glenside		20 Landscape Rd, Rathfarnham, Dublin 14			
The Goat Bar & Grill		14 Lower Kilmacud Rd, Drummartin, Dublin, D14 PY56			
The Old Orchard Inn		74 Butterfield Ave, Rathfarnham, Dublin 14, D14 RF96			
The Revels		37 Main St, Rathfarnham, Dublin 14, D14 Y5N7			
The Yellow House		1 Willbrook Rd, Rathfarnham, Dublin 14, D14 Y892			
Uncle Tom's Cabin		Dundrum Rd, Dundrum, Dublin 14, D14 W895			
Myos		Castleknock Rd, Castleknock, Dublin 15			
TGI Friday's		15 The Mall, Blanchardstown, Dublin 15, D15 E0V1			
Ballinteer House		SuperValu Shopping Centre, Ballinteer Ave, Ballinteer, Dublin			
Brickyard Gastropub		Ground Floor, North Block, Rockfield Central, Dundrum, Dublin 16			
Bugler's Ballyboden House		Ballyboden Rd, Rathfarnham, Dublin			
Delany's Public House / The Knocklyon Inn		Knocklyon Rd, Knocklyon, Dublin			
Eden House Gastro Bar		16 Grange Rd, Haroldsgrange, Dublin, D16 WP70			
Ollie's Bar Sandyford		Unit 1, Balally Shopping Centre, Blackthorn Dr, Sandyford, Dublin, D16 H363			
Taylor's Three Rock		Grange Rd, Rathfarnham, Dublin 16			
The Blue Haven		1 Ballyroan Rd, Rathfarnham, Dublin, D16 N803			
The Coach House		16 Ballinteer Ave, Ballinteer, Dublin			
The Furry Bog		Whitechurch Shopping Centre, Whitechurch Green, Edmondstown, Dublin 16			
The Merry Ploughboy Gastro Pub		Edmondstown Rd, Rathfarnham, Dublin 16, D16 HK02			
The Willows		26 Willow Rd, Dundrum, Dublin, D16 X379			
Newtown House		Malahide Road Industrial Park, Dublin			
The Balgriffin Inn		Malahide Rd, Belcamp, DUBLIN 17, D17 V128			
The Priorswood Inn		Proirswood Shopping Centre, Clonshaugh Ave, Priorswood, Dublin, D17 XV48			
Sandyford House		Sandyford Village, Woodside, Dublin			
The Blue Light		Barnacullia, Sandyford, Dublin 18, D18 PF72			
The Gallops		Ballyogan Rd, Carmanhall And Leopardstown, Dublin			
The Golden Ball Kilternan		Enniskerry Rd, Kiltiernan Domain, Kilternan, Co. Dublin, D18 TP30			
The Horse and the Hound		Bray Rd, Kilbogget, Dublin			
The Step Inn		Enniskerry Rd, Stepaside Village, Dublin 18			
Palmerstown House Pub		Old Lucan Road Palmerstown, Dublin 20			
The Deadman's Inn		Lucan Rd Old, Curtis Stream, Palmerstown, Co. Dublin			
The Mullingar House		Chapelizod, Dublin			
The Silver Granite		Kennelsfort Rd Upper, Redcowfarm, Dublin 20, D20 R276			
The Villager		31 Main Street Chapelizod Dublin Dublin 20 Dublin City, Co. Dublin, D20 EP29			
Wrights Anglers Restaurant		20 Knockmaroon Hill, Castleknock, Dublin, D20 AH96			
Metzo		Neilstown Rd, Clondalkin, Dublin			
Red Cow Inn		The Red Cow Complex, Naas Rd, Redcow, Dublin 22, D22 R5P3			
5 Rock		20 Harbour Rd, Townparks, Skerries, Co. Dublin, K34 HX36			
Blue Bar		25 Harbour Rd, Townparks, Skerries, Co. Dublin, K34 EW60			
Duffy's Bar and Lounge		Main St, Malahide, Co. Dublin			
Forty Four Main Street		17 Holywell Manor, Feltrim Hall, Swords, Co. Dublin			
Fowler's Malahide		12 New St, Malahide, Co. Dublin			
Gibney's Of Malahide		6 New St, Malahide, Co. Dublin, K36 HW67			
Grainger's The Manor Inn		Manor Mall Shopping Centre, Brackenstown Rd, Mooretown, Swords, Co. Dublin, K67 N4X9			
Hogs & Heifers Swords		Airside Retail Park, Swords, Co. Dublin			
Joe May's		Harbour Rd, Townparks, Skerries, Co. Dublin			
K Sixty Seven Swords		North street swords Swords co, Dublin, K67 W4A9			
McGoverns Restaurant		The Diamond, Main Street, Malahide, Dublin			
Nealon's Bar		12 Church St, Townparks, Skerries, Co. Dublin, K34 XY22			
O'Dwyer's Bar & Grill		Strand Rd, Burrow, Portmarnock, Co. Dublin			
Peacocks Bar & Lounge		Rivervalley Shopping Centre, River Valley Rd, Hilltown, Swords, Co. Dublin, K67 C9Y1			
Stoop Your Head		19 Harbour Rd, Townparks, Skerries, Co. Dublin, K34 T221			
The Arch Bar		8 Main St, Townparks, Swords, Co. Dublin			
The Betsy Swords		16 Main St, Swords Glebe, Swords, Co. Dublin			
The Brick House		24 Harbour Rd, Townparks, Skerries, Co. Dublin, K34 RW82			
The Coachman's Inn		Cloughran, Airport Road, Dublin			
The Coast Skerries Inn		66 Church St, Townparks, Skerries, Co. Dublin			
The Cock Tavern		31 Main St, Townparks, Swords, Co. Dublin, K67 X923			
The Gladstone Inn		16 The Cross, Townparks, Skerries, Co. Dublin, K34 V593			
The Old Borough - JD Wetherspoon		72 Main St, Townparks, Swords, Co. Dublin			
The Old Schoolhouse		Church Rd, Townparks, Swords, Co. Dublin, K67 Y935			
The Pound & The Attic		Bridge St, Townparks, Swords, Co. Dublin			
The Snug Skerries		17 New St, Townparks, Skerries, Co. Dublin, K34 CK27			
Wrights Cafe Bar		The Plaza, Malahide Rd, Townparks, Swords, Co. Dublin			
Baker's Corner		Rochestown Ave, Woodpark, Dún Laoghaire, Co. Dublin			
Big Mike's		Rock Hill, Blackrock, Dublin, A94 C2N7			
Boland's		1 The Hill, Stillorgan, Dublin			
Brady's of Shankill		Dublin Road R119, Shankill, Dublin			
Brass Bar & Grill		Talbot Hotel, Stillorgan Rd, Stillorgan, Dublin, A94 V6K5			
Buck Mulligan's		128 George's Street Lower, Dún Laoghaire, Dublin, A96 YV10			
Byrnes of Galloping Green		Stillorgan Rd, Stillorgan, Dublin			
Conways		3 Main St, Newtown Blackrock, Blackrock, Co. Dublin, A94 NA06			
Dunphys		41 George's Street Lower, Dún Laoghaire, Co. Dublin, A96 YR23			
Finnegan's of Dalkey		1 Sorrento Rd, Dalkey Commons, Dalkey, Co. Dublin, A96 CX47			
Fitzgeralds of Sandycove		11 Sandycove Road, Sandycove, Dublin, A96 WE09			
Hartley's		1 Harbour Road, Dún Laoghaire, Dublin			
Igo Inn		Military Rd, Ballybrack, Co. Dublin			
Jack O'Rourke's		15 Main St, Blackrock, Dublin, A94 HN66			
Johnnie Fox's Pub		Glencullen, Co. Dublin			
Kelly & Coopers		39 Main St, Newtown Blackrock, Blackrock, Co. Dublin, A94 C7W0			
McKenna’s Pub		8 Wellington St, Dún Laoghaire, Dublin, A96 P298			
McLoughlin's Bar		73 George's Street Upper, Dún Laoghaire, Dublin, A96 X8N8			
O'Dwyers of Kilmacud		1st floor, Ground Floor and Garden Terrace, 118 Lower Kilmacud Rd, Stillorgan, Dublin, A94 TN99			
O'Loughlin's		26 George's Street Lower, Dún Laoghaire, Dublin, A96 KP62			
P. McCormack & Sons		67 Mounttown Rd Lower, Dún Laoghaire, Dublin, A96 E4Y6			
Stillorgan Orchard		1 The Hill, Stillorgan, Dublin, A94 VY94			
The Blackrock		1-5 Temple Rd, Carysfort Ave, Newtown Blackrock, Blackrock, Co. Dublin, A94 Y5F1			
The Club Bar and Restaurant		107 Coliemore Rd, Dalkey Commons, Dalkey, Co. Dublin, A96 HX75			
The Coliemore		115/116 Coliemore Rd, Dalkey Commons, Dublin, A96 HE22			
The Dalkey Duck		Castle Street Castle St, Dalkey, Dublin, A96 RY62			
The Druid's Chair		Killiney Hill Rd, Rocheshill, Killiney, Co. Dublin			
The Eagle		18-19 Glasthule Rd, Dún Laoghaire, Glasthule, Co. Dublin, A96 H2N1			
The Forty Foot - JD Wetherspoon		The Pavilion Centre, Marine Rd, Dún Laoghaire, Dublin, A96 TRX4			
The Graduate		Killiney Shopping Centre, Rochestown Ave, Rochestown Domain, Dún Laoghaire, Co. Dublin, A96 KA09			
The Grange Pub		Deansgrange Rd, Deansgrange, Blackrock, Co. Dublin, A94 AW64			
The King's Inn		Castle St, Dalkey, Dublin, A96 VK71			
The Leopardstown Inn		Brewery Rd, Stillorgan, Dublin, A94 F6Y0			
The Lighthouse		88 George's Street Lower, Dún Laoghaire, Dublin, A96 YA39			
The Lough Inn		Unit 1, Loughlinstown Shopping Centre, Loughlinstown Dr, Glenageary, Dublin, A96 A5Y3			
The Millhouse		The Millhouse, Kilmacud, Co. Dublin			
The Old Punch Bowl		116 Rock Rd, Booterstown, Blackrock, Co. Dublin, A94 X2C6			
The Purty Kitchen		3-5, 3-5 Old Dunleary Rd, Dún Laoghaire, Dublin, A96 X7W1			
The Queen's Bar		12 Castle St, Dalkey, Co. Dublin, A96 YY50			
The Sallynoggin Inn		Woodpark, Dublin			
The Two Foxes Pub		17 George's Street Upper, Dún Laoghaire, Dublin, A96 HP60			
The Wicked Wolf		Main Street, Blackrock, Dublin			
The Wishing Well		20 Newtown Park, Stillorgan Park, Blackrock, Co. Dublin, A94 A6Y6			
Walters		68 George's Street Upper, Dún Laoghaire, Dublin, A96 Y981			
Carrolls Gastro Pub		1 Lower Main St, Lucan And Pettycanon, Lucan, Co. Dublin, K78 K0H6			
Courtney's of Lucan		Leixlip Rd, Lucan And Pettycanon, Lucan, Co. Dublin, K78 HF83			
Kennys of Lucan		7 Main St, Lucan Demesne, Dublin			
Pennyhill Pub		Ballyowen Castle Shopping Centre, Ballyowen, Lucan, Co. Dublin			
The Ball Alley House		Leixlip Rd, Lucan And Pettycanon, Lucan, Co. Dublin, K78 X5AO			
The Ballyneety Bar		Lucan Hotel, Junction 4A N4 Westbound, Cooldrinagh, Lucan, Co. Dublin, K78 X3H3			
The Foxhunter		Ballydowd, Lucan, Co. Dublin			
The Lord Lucan		Finnstown Shopping Centre, 5 Newcastle Rd, Finnstown, Lucan, Co. Dublin			

== See also ==
- List of bars
- List of pubs in the United Kingdom
- List of public house topics
