= Mulligan's =

Pub in Dublin

Coordinates: 53.34687°N 6.25558°W

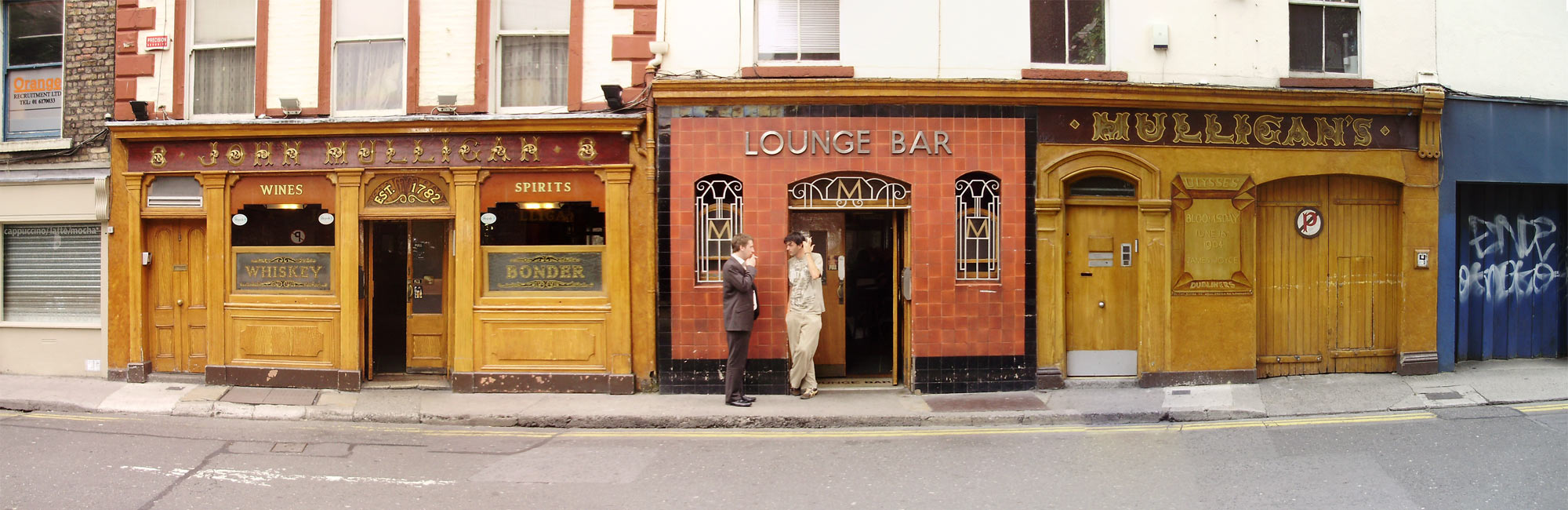
Mulligan's pub on Poolbeg Street, Dublin

Mulligan's is a pub in Dublin, Ireland, which opened on Poolbeg Street in 1854.

== History ==
The first Mulligan's was established on Thomas Street, Dublin in 1782. The Mulligan family moved their business to several different premises, before leasing the present building in 1854 at 8/9 Poolbeg Street, Dublin 2. Ownership later passed to Con and Tommy Cusack, before passing to Tommy Cusack's sons.

The former Theatre Royal in Hawkins Street was near Mulligan's, and the pub walls are decorated with associated posters, photographs, and showbills dating back to the early nineteenth century, as well as an autographed photograph of Judy Garland, who performed in the theatre and drank at the pub.

The pub is mentioned briefly in James Joyce's short story, "Counterparts", and was used as a filming location on a number of occasions. Journalists and writers drank at Mulligan's during the twentieth century, including staff from The Irish Times and from the former Irish Press newspaper—which operated next door until the collapse of the paper in 1995. A number of Dublin musicians also drank there, as several music industry management offices were in the nearby Corn Exchange Building.

In his 1969 book Irish Pubs of Character, Roy Bulson describes the establishment thus: "The licence is one of the oldest in Dublin, dating from 1782. The late President of the U.S., John F. Kennedy, called in for a drink and since then many other famous people have enjoyed a pint which is one of the best in Dublin. There are three bars, all with a genuine old-time atmosphere. As Mulligan's was across from the stage door of the old Theatre Royal, various theatre posters of this period can be seen. The hosts are very friendly and you will be sure of a warm welcome. Television is available."

An American tourist named Billy Brooks Carr, for whom Mulligan's was one of his "favourite places to visit in Ireland", reputedly requested that his ashes be kept in the pub's grandfather clock.

== See also ==
- List of pubs in Dublin

== Sources ==
- Bulson, Roy (1969). Irish Pubs of Character. Dublin: Bruce Spicer Ltd.
