= The Bleeding Horse =

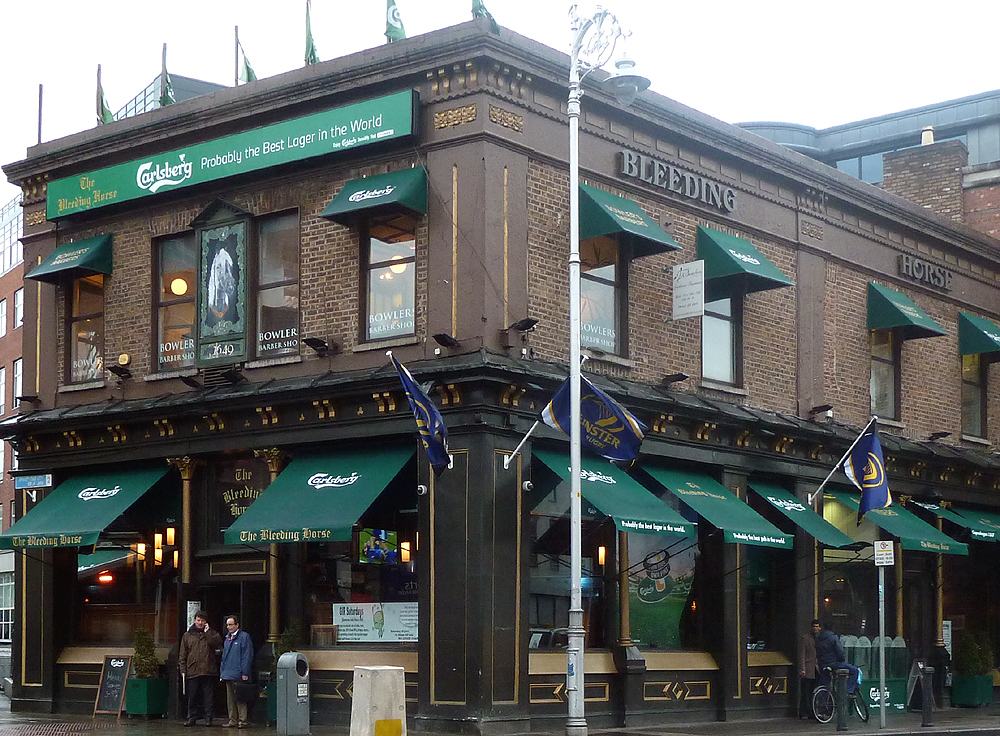
- Interactive map of the The Bleeding Horse area
- Former names: The Falcon

General information
- Type: Pub
- Location: 24 Camden Street Upper, Dublin, Ireland
- Coordinates: 53.333543°N 6.264907°W
- Completed: 1871

The Bleeding Horse is a pub on Upper Camden Street, Dublin, Ireland. It dates at least back to the 17th century, and was located on St. Kevin's Port (now Camden Street) at the junction of two important highways leading out of the city. On one side was Charlotte Street, leading to Ranelagh and Donnybrook; on the other side was Old Camden Street, which joined Richmond Street, and led to Rathmines and Cullenswood. Both of these old streets disappeared during the renovations in the 1990s. The present building dates from 1871; the interior was renovated in 1992.

There are (at least) two explanations for the name. One is that when a horse got the "staggers" it was bled by a farrier at the inn. Another is that the name of the pub comes from an incident during the Battle of Rathmines in 1649, when a wounded horse fled from the battle.

The Bleeding Horse has been mentioned in several novels, including the Cock and Anchor (1845) by Sheridan Le Fanu and Ulysses by James Joyce. Literary patrons included James Clarence Mangan and Oliver St. John Gogarty.

For several years during the 1960s the name of the pub was changed to "The Falcon", but the original name was replaced in the 1970s.

== Description from the Cock and Anchor ==
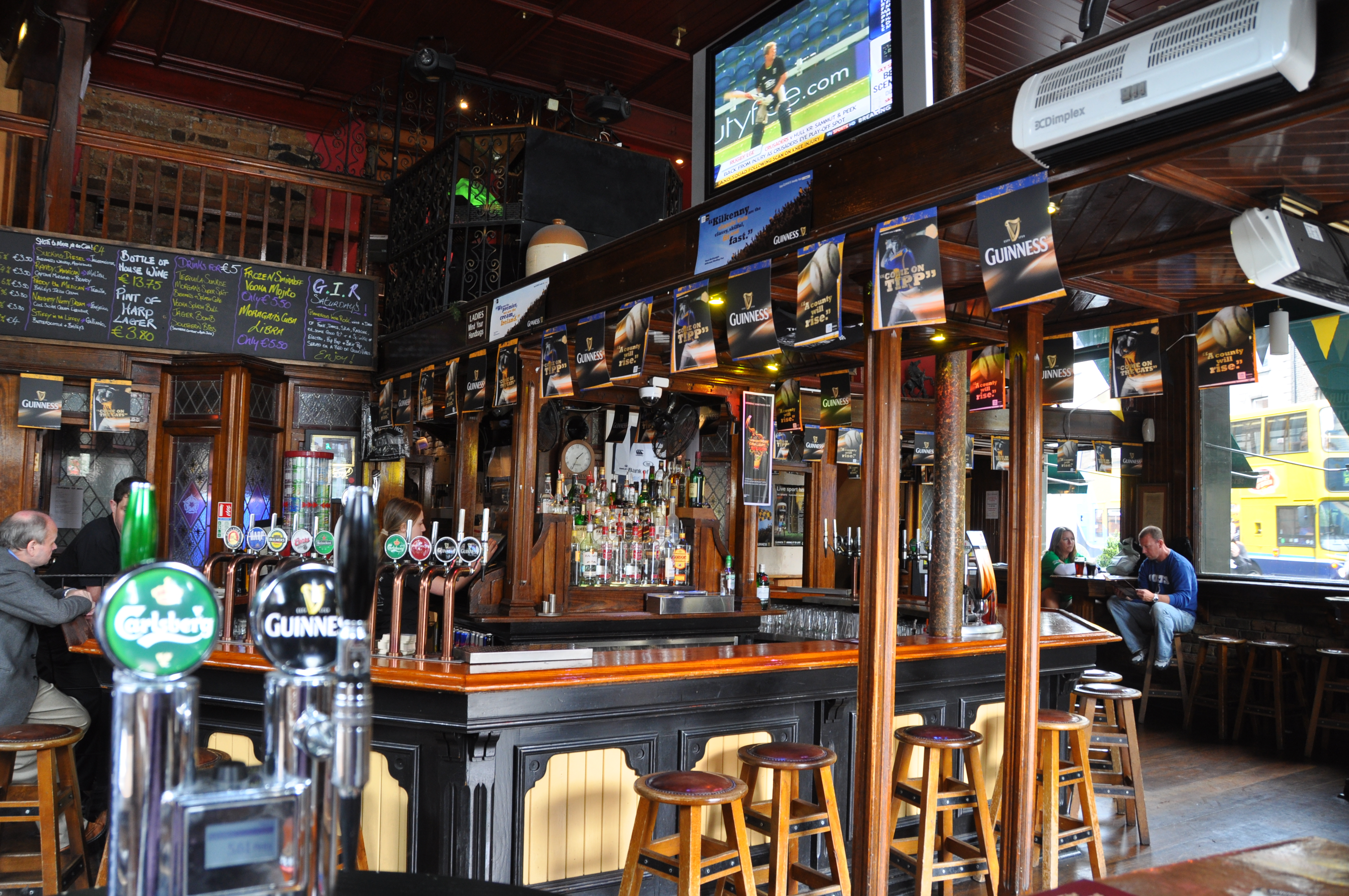
Interior

At the time in which the events that we have undertaken to record took place, there stood at the southern extremity of the city, near the point at which Camden Street now terminates, a small, old-fashioned building, something between an ale-house and an inn. It occupied the roadside by no means unpicturesquely; one gable jutted into the road, with a projecting window, which stood out from the building like a glass box held together by a massive frame of wood; and commanded by this projecting gable, and a few yards in retreat, but facing the road, was the inn door, over which hung a painted panel, representing a white horse, out of whose neck there spouted a crimson cascade, and underneath, in large letters, the traveller was informed that this was the genuine old "Bleeding Horse."

== See also ==
- List of pubs in Dublin
