= Marie Conmee =

Irish actor and gay activist (1933–1994)

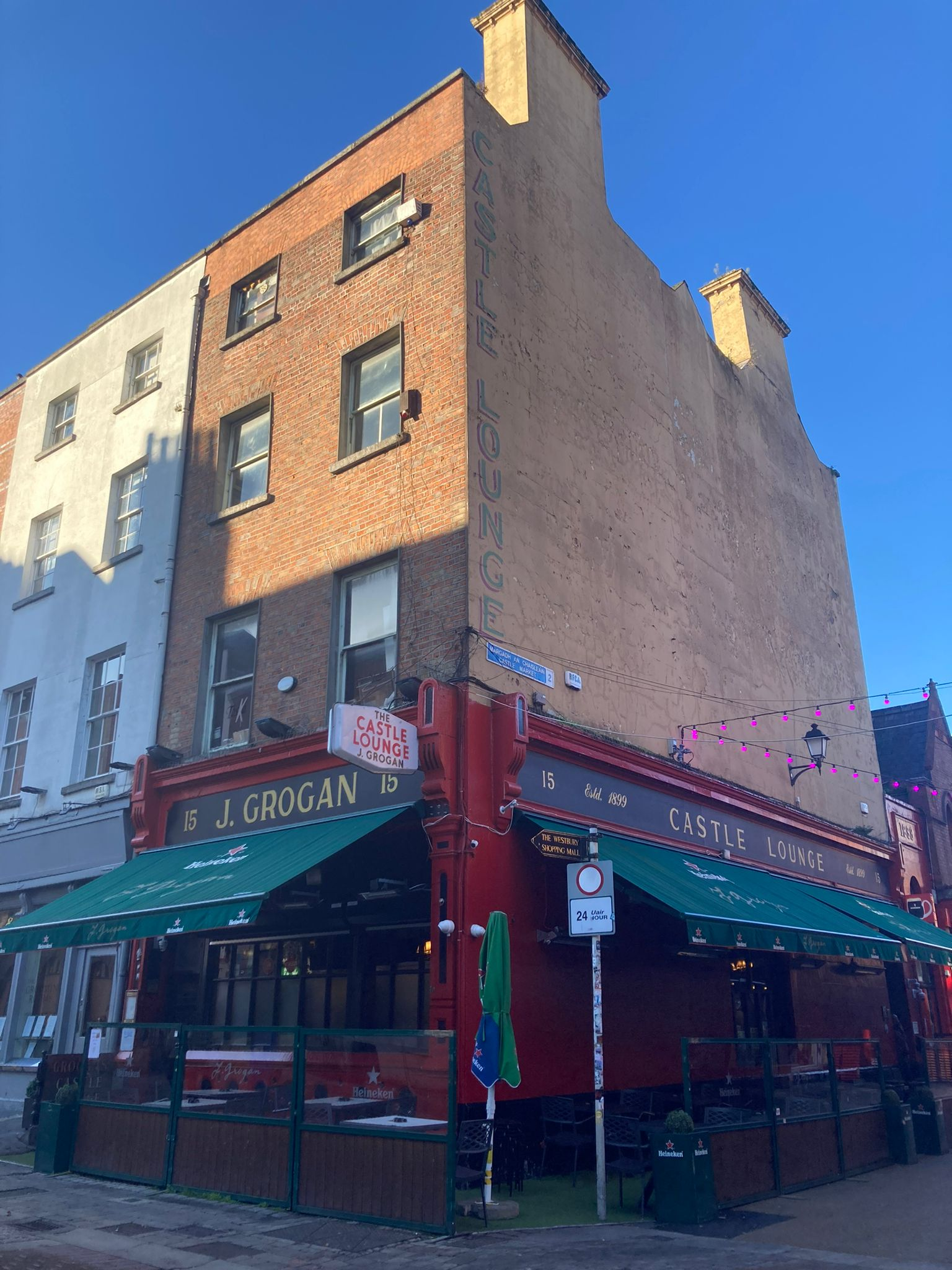
Grogan's pub on South William Street in Dublin where Marie Conmee and her partner Mary Brady were said to have hosted their secret LGBTQ+ meetups

Marie Conmee (1933–1994) was an Irish film and stage actor and gay activist.

With her partner Mary Brady, she facilitated a monthly group for lesbians to meet in a pub in Dublin in the 1980s, at a time when such opportunities were scarce.

Her acting career spanned almost 40 years, and she appeared in films, including This Other Eden (1959), Educating Rita (1983), and My Left Foot (1989) and Circle of Friends (1995). She appeared in plays including the first productions of Hugh Leonard's Madigan's Lock (1958), Adrian Vale and Chloe Gibson's Inquiry at Lisieux (1963) and Peter Sheridan's Down all the Days (1982).

She was born in Sligo and died in Dublin. A writer in the Irish Independent in 2004 described her as having been "massively built".
