= Educating Rita (film) =

1983 British film by Lewis Gilbert

- Theatrical release poster
- Directed by: Lewis Gilbert
- Screenplay by: Willy Russell
- Based on: Educating Rita by Willy Russell
- Produced by: Lewis Gilbert
- Starring: Michael Caine; Julie Walters
- Cinematography: Frank Watts
- Edited by: Garth Craven
- Music by: David Hentschel
- Production company: Acorn Pictures
- Distributed by: Rank Film Distributors (United Kingdom); Columbia Pictures (International)
- Release dates: 3 May 1983 (London); 28 October 1983 (United States)
- Running time: 110 minutes
- Country: United Kingdom
- Language: English
- Budget: £4 million
- Box office: $14.6 million (US)

Educating Rita is a 1983 British comedy-drama film directed by Lewis Gilbert with a screenplay by Willy Russell based on his 1980 stage play. The film stars Michael Caine, Julie Walters, Michael Williams and Maureen Lipman. It won multiple major awards for best actor and best actress and was nominated for three Academy Awards. Caine and Walters both won BAFTA and Golden Globe awards for best actor and actress. The British Film Institute ranked Educating Rita the 84th greatest British film of the 20th century.

== Plot ==
Susan (who initially calls herself Rita), a 26-year-old working-class hairdresser, is dissatisfied with the routine of her work and social life; she is reluctant to have a child, fearing it will tie her to the same monotonous routine for life, and she yearns to escape to something more profound, without exactly knowing what that is. She seeks to better herself by signing up for and attending an Open University course in Literature.

Susan's assigned Open University tutor, Frank Bryant, is jaded and has long ago openly taken to the bottle, describing himself as "an appalling teacher". Bryant's passion for literature is rekindled by Rita, whose technical ability for the subject is limited by her lack of education but whose enthusiasm Frank finds refreshing. Frank initially has misgivings about Rita's ability to adapt to student culture, but is impressed by her verve and earnestness and is forced to re-examine his attitudes and position in life; Susan finds Frank's tutelage opens doors to a bohemian lifestyle and a new self-confidence.

Frank's bitterness and cynicism return as he notices Susan beginning to adopt the pretensions of the university culture he despises. Susan becomes disillusioned by a friend's attempted suicide and realises that her new social niche is rife with the same dishonesty and superficiality she had previously sought to escape. The film ends as Frank, sent to Australia on a sabbatical, welcomes the possibilities of the change.

== Cast ==
- Michael Caine as Dr Frank Bryant
- Julie Walters as Susan "Rita" White
- Michael Williams as Brian
- Dearbhla Molloy as Elaine
- Jeananne Crowley as Julia, Frank's girlfriend
- Malcolm Douglas as Denny White, Rita's husband
- Godfrey Quigley as Rita's father
- Patricia Jeffares as Rita's mother
- Maeve Germaine as Sandra, Rita's sister
- Maureen Lipman as Trish, Rita's roommate
- Gerry Sullivan as Security Officer
- Pat Daly as Bursar
- Kim Fortune as Collins
- Philip Hurdwood as Tiger
- Hilary Reynolds as Lesley
- Jack Walsh as Price
- Christopher Casson as Professor
- Gabrielle Reidy as Barbara
- Des Nealon as Invigilator
- Marie Conmee as Customer in Hairdressers
- Oliver Maguire as Tutor
- Derry Power as Photographer
- Alan Stanford as Bistro Manager

== Production ==
Lewis Gilbert says it was difficult to raise finance for the film. "Columbia wanted me to cast Dolly Parton as Rita". Julie Walters, in her feature film debut, reprised her role from the stage production.

Finance was raised through a new company, Acorn Productions, formed by Lewis Gilbert and his partner Herbert Oates. It attracted investors in the wake of the success of Gandhi including the Pru and Coal Board pension funds.

The film is set in an unnamed English university and port city: most of the working-class characters have Scouse accents. However, it was shot entirely in and around Dublin, where minor adjustments were made to suggest the city is in the UK: in several street scenes, for example, British red telephone boxes appear. Trinity College Dublin, is used as the setting for the university, and University College Dublin, in Belfield, is used for Rita's summer school. The rooms used by Bryant as his office and tutorial room were those of the College Historical Society and the University Philosophical Society, respectively; and while the building was considerably refurnished, the production chose to leave portraits of Douglas Hyde and Isaac Butt and committee photographs in the former, and a bust of John Pentland Mahaffy in the latter. No. 8 Hogan Avenue in Dublin 2, near Grand Canal Dock, was used for Rita's house in the film, and one in Burlington Road, Ballsbridge, for Bryant's. The scene where Rita runs into her ex Denny and his new wife was filmed in the South Lotts area of Ringsend. The scene in France was filmed in Maynooth, County Kildare, and Pearse Station and Dublin Airport were used. The pub scene was shot in The Stag's Head on Dame Court in Dublin. However, the pub which Rita enters is the Dame Tavern which is opposite The Stag's Head. Filming also took place in Stoneybatter, with Aughrim Street Church being used for the wedding scene. Stanhope Street School was used as a production base.

== Release ==
The film had its premiere at the Leicester Square Theatre in London on 3 May 1983, attended by Prince Philip, Duke of Edinburgh, who attended as president of the National Playing Fields Association. The film opened to the public the following day at Warner West End and at the Classic cinema on Haymarket, London. It opened in third place at the London box office behind Tootsie and Sophie's Choice. It was the Rank Organisation's most successful film of the 1980s.

== Reception ==
=== Critical response ===
Variety magazine in December 1982 lauded Walters' interpretation of Rita as "[w]itty, down-to-earth, kind and loaded with common sense". "Rita", the review continues, "is the antithesis of the humorless, stuffy and stagnated academic world she so longs to infiltrate. Julie Walters injects her with just the right mix of comedy and pathos."

Ian Nathan reviewing the film for Britain's Empire magazine calls the film a "gem", and gives it four out of five stars. He describes Walters's "splendidly rich interpretation" of Rita and characterises her "reactions to the traditions of English lit[erature] [as] carry[ing] the caustic brilliance of true intelligence, a shattering of blithe pretension". Of Walters and Caine, Nathan opines, "they make a beautifully odd couple, in a love story at one remove". This reviewer depicts the director's effort as "effective, and finally optimistic," and observes about the film that the playwright's "angry message that people are trapped by their environment not their abilities, is salved by the sweetness of [Frank's and Rita's] final parting." Nathan's "verdict" of the film is one of "[c]harming, glittering characterisations that, though they don't run deep, nevertheless refresh."

Janet Maslin of The New York Times called the film "an awkward blend of intellectual pretension and cute obvious humour" and "the perfect play about literature for anyone who wouldn't dream of actually reading books"; she wrote that "the essentially two-character play has been opened up to the point that it includes a variety of settings and subordinate figures, but it never approaches anything lifelike".

Film critic Roger Ebert of the Chicago Sun-Times gave the film two stars out of four, calling the film a "forced march through a formula relationship"; he said Russell's screen adaptation "added mistresses, colleagues, husbands, in-laws, students and a faculty committee, [that were] all unnecessary" and said the playwright/screenwriter "start[ed] with an idealistic, challenging idea, and then cynically tr[ied] to broaden its appeal".

Educating Rita holds an 82% rating on Rotten Tomatoes based on seventeen reviews. Metacritic, which uses a weighted average, assigned the film a score of 54 out of 100, based on 10 critics, indicating "mixed or average" reviews.

=== Accolades ===
Award	Category	Nominee(s)	Result
Academy Awards	Best Actor	Michael Caine	Nominated
Academy Awards	Best Actress	Julie Walters	Nominated
Academy Awards	Best Screenplay – Based on Material from Another Medium	Willy Russell	Nominated
British Academy Film Awards	Best Film	Lewis Gilbert	Won
British Academy Film Awards	Best Actor in a Leading Role	Michael Caine	Won
British Academy Film Awards	Best Actress in a Leading Role	Julie Walters	Won
British Academy Film Awards	Best Actress in a Supporting Role	Maureen Lipman	Nominated
British Academy Film Awards	Best Screenplay – Adapted	Willy Russell	Nominated
British Academy Film Awards	Most Promising Newcomer to Leading Film Roles	Julie Walters	Nominated
Golden Globe Awards	Best Foreign Film		Nominated
Golden Globe Awards	Best Actor in a Motion Picture – Musical or Comedy	Michael Caine	Won
Golden Globe Awards	Best Actress in a Motion Picture – Musical or Comedy	Julie Walters	Won
Golden Globe Awards	Best Screenplay – Motion Picture	Willy Russell	Nominated
National Board of Review Awards	Top Ten Films		2nd Place

=== Retrospective assessments ===
In 1999, the film was among the BFI Top 100 British films.

In 2007, while promoting the remake of Sleuth, Caine called Educating Rita "the last good picture [he] made before [he] mentally retired." In his 2010 autobiography, The Elephant to Hollywood, Caine stated: "Educating Rita is the most perfect performance I could give of a character who was as far away from me as you could possibly get and of all the films I have ever been in, I think it may be the one I am most proud of".

== Home media ==
The film was released on DVD in the UK and the US. ITV Studios released the film onto Blu-Ray in the UK (Region B) in 2008 as a 25th Anniversary edition, to mark twenty-five years since the film's release. This edition was discontinued, but in May 2018, ITV Studios released the film onto Blu-ray again.

== Proposed remake ==
In November 2002, the then-82-year-old director Lewis Gilbert went public with plans to remake his film "with a black cast that could include Halle Berry and Denzel Washington", with principal photography to commence in 2003. The project did not come to pass, and Gilbert's final film was Before You Go (2003).

== See also ==
- Rubyfruit Jungle, a novel by Rita Mae Brown, studied with great enthusiasm by Rita
- BFI Top 100 British films
