= The Brazen Head =

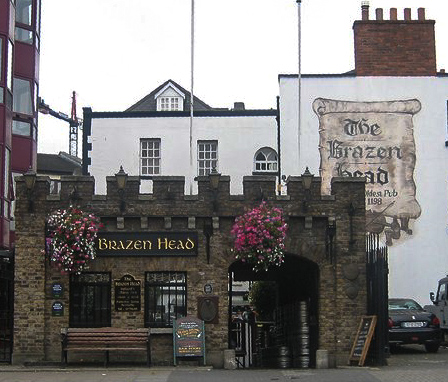
- Main façade—a modern addition—of the building in 2013.
- Interactive map of the The Brazen Head area

General information
- Type: 18th century coaching inn
- Architectural style: Georgian; Late-20th century extension
- Location: 20 Lower Bridge Street, Dublin, Ireland
- Coordinates: 53.34494°N 6.27631°W
- Completed: c.1754
- Owner: Stepmark Inns (2004—present)

Website
- www.brazenhead.com

The Brazen Head is a pub in Merchant's Quay, Dublin, built as a coaching inn in 1754, on the site of a merchant's dwelling dating back to at least 1613. lt received a licence to sell ale in 1661, and the first mention of it as an inn was in 1668. (Note: The first licensing law in Ireland—"An Act for keepers of Alehouses to be bound by Recognizance"—was passed in 1635.)

== History ==
=== Pre-17th century ===
Archaeological excavation, during September–November 1989, of the land immediately adjacent to The Brazen Head demonstrated evidence that the area had been in use as early as the 13th century, when activities to reclaim the riverside marshland began. Wicker mats—used to establish foundations on the silted floodplain—and a section of post-and-wattle wall dating from the 13th century were found, along with many medieval pot sherds and other artefacts. Although The Brazen Head does not appear on H.B. Clarke's map of medieval Dublin c.840 – c.1540, McMahon writes that there was another "substantial building" in the area, called "Carles Inn".

=== 17th century ===
Frank Hopkins, in his Rare Old Dublin: Heroes, Hawkers & Hoors (2002), writes that a "Brazen Head" on Bridge street is first recorded in 1613, described as a messuage—a plot of land for a house or a "residential building taken together with its outbuildings and assigned land"—owned by Richard and Elinor Fagan. However, this reference to a 1613 Brazen Head did not take place until 1700, where it appears in a writ issued against the estate by three merchants—John Withington, James King, and John Kennan—relating to an outstanding debt dating from 1613.

In the 17th century, Bridge Street was a "residential area for the nobility and wealthy merchants", and residents included Sir Winston Churchill and the Marquess of Antrim. Fagan was a merchant and landowner from a distinguished lineage—his grandfather, also named Richard, had been high sheriff of the county of Dublin in 1575 and lord mayor of the city in 1587. Fagan's wife Elinor was also his 2nd cousin, and her grandfather had been high sheriff in 1565, and lord mayor in 1573. Their grandfathers were brothers who owned land and property in Dublin, County Meath, County Sligo and Munster, and had also been Masters of Dublin's Merchants' Guild. As an only child, Elinor had inherited the entirety of her father's estate in 1599.

The property on Bridge Street eventually passed to Richard's grandson—also named Richard, and also married to an Elinor—but was confiscated in 1691 owing to the younger Richard having fought in the Jacobite Irish Army at the Siege of Derry, the Battle of Aughrim, and the Battle of the Boyne during the Williamite War in Ireland. (Note: The value of the confiscated estate—made up of 1,429 acres in Dublin, 919 acres in Meath and 2,507 acres in Sligo—was £100,000 in 1691, the equivalent of £12.3 million in 2017.) Following the Battle of the Boyne, William of Orange had offered a pardon to all Jacobite soldiers who laid down their arms. Fagan, then a captain in James's army, did so, and made for Connacht, but was intercepted by Jacobite rapparees and shot as a traitor. It was the activities of the rapparees that led to an order being issued for all officers who had laid down arms to report to the authorities on pain of being declared outlaw and having their lands and property confiscated. When the deceased Fagan failed to report, his estates were seized by the Crown.

=== 18th century ===
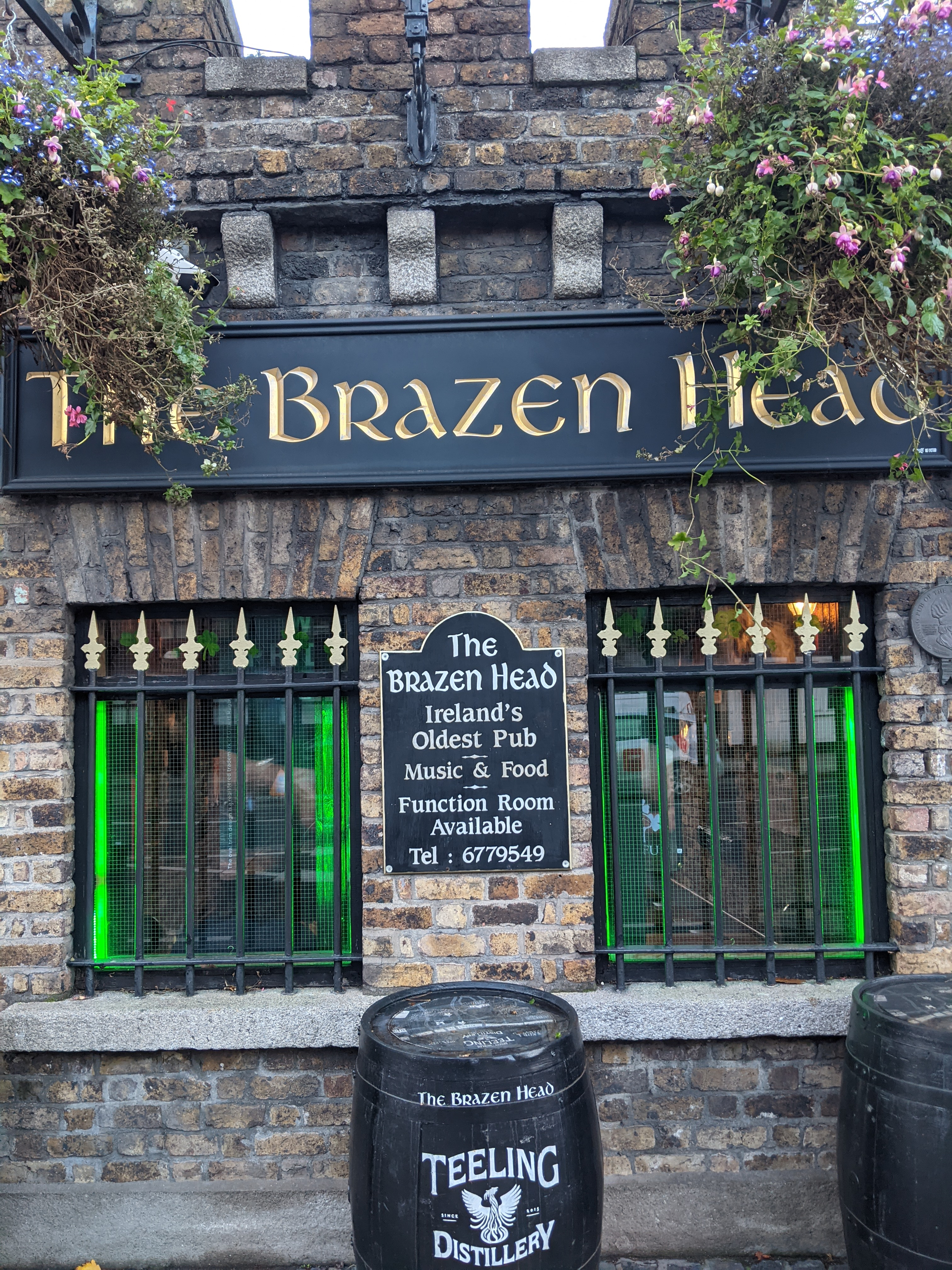
A close-up image of The Brazen Head's exterior, with signage

On 21 May 1703, the Brazen Head was granted to James King—one of the three merchants who had served a writ against the forfeited estate in 1700—and described as a "large timber house ... containing 35 feet 6 inches in front, 49 feet in rear and 168 feet in depth with all outhouses, stables, yards etc." Hopkins writes that the Brazen Head was extended in 1704 through the lease of adjacent property to the rear. At this time, Bridge Street was changing from a residential area to "a busy commercial centre" and the merchants began leasing the ground floor of their houses to shops and businesses, particularly those in the textile and hardware trades. At the Brazen Head, textile merchants John Lloyd and Stephen Sly sold various "Broadcloths, Druggets, Sarges, Damasks, Poplins, Shammy skins" and "woollen goods by wholesale or retaile."

The "large timber house" was replaced by the current buildings in 1754. (Note: The date for the rebuilding appears to be confirmed by a 1755 sale announcement by Benjamin Litton for "the interest of the lease for a large, convenient house in Bridge Street opposite the new Brazen Head Inn".) By April 1765, the inn contained "thirty rooms, kitchen, cellar, scullery and many other conveniences, with sufficient stabling."

Timothy Dawson's research, in 1969, of historical documents relating to the inn found that the tenancy was advertised in 1765 by Robert Autchinson. In 1770, the inn was kept by Jack Geoghegan, who also owned a farm nearby, enabling him to sell "hay, grass and corn on more moderate terms than any other Inn or Hotel in town." For several months in 1782–1783, the inn was kept by Michael Dignan, who appears to have been less than successful as an innkeeper: his replacement, Denis Mitchell, placed an advertisement for the inn promising "the most unremitting care and attention" to please "gentlemen and traders" in an attempt to "regain the character the house so justly lost." John Lonergan, a highwayman from Waterford, also left a message engraved on a pane of glass, half way up the staircase, to the effect that he halted there on 7 August 1786.

Until the late 1960s, a room existed in the pub named the Robert Emmet Room. The table used by Emmet (1778–1803) still stood in situ where the visitor could look out towards the entrance, as Emmet did, so as to give advance warning of approaching enemies.

=== 20th century ===
In his 1969 book Irish Pubs of Character, Roy Bulson describes the establishment thus: "The Brazen Head was formerly an old coaching inn, and the pub itself maintains its old world charm and has been frequented by many famous Irish patriots such as Robert Emmet, Edmund Burke, Daniel O'Connell, Henry Grattan and Wolfe Tone. [..] The bar has various antique pieces of interest. Although draught beer is unavailable, there is a good selection of bottled beers. Visiting ladies should be accompanied".

== See also ==
- List of pubs in Dublin
