= Royal Hibernian Hotel =

Former Hotel in Dublin Ireland

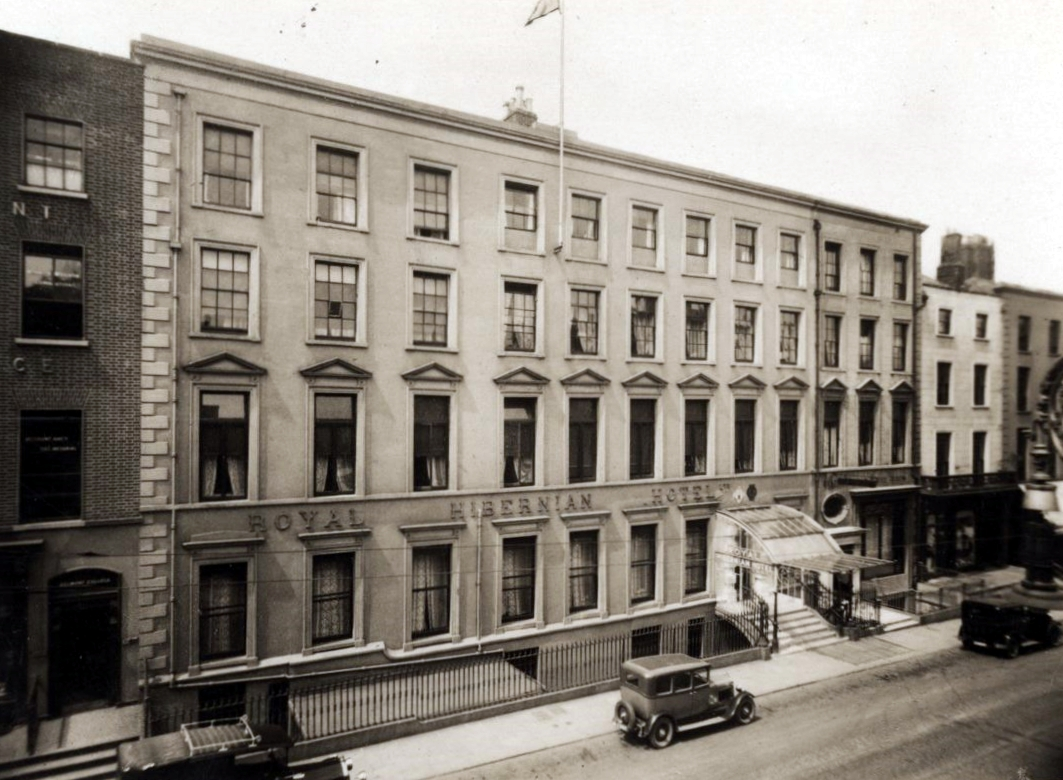
- Royal Hibernian Hotel circa 1930s

- Location within Central Dublin

General information
- Classification: 5 stars
- Location: Dawson Street; Dublin 2
- Coordinates: 53.3414°N 6.2585°W
- Opening: 1751
- Renovated: 1956 (additional mansard level added)
- Owner: Paul Besson (1939-1950); Kenneth Besson (1950-1975); Trust House Forte (1975-1982)

Height
- Height: 5 storey over basement

The Royal Hibernian Hotel was a hotel on Dawson Street, Dublin, Ireland. Its history dates back to 1751, making it one of the country's first hotels, and it was popular with the wealthy in the 19th century. Its restaurants specialised in haute cuisine, which gradually declined in popularity in the 20th century, leading to the hotel's closure in 1982 and subsequent demolition and replacement with the Royal Hibernian Way and the offices of Davy Stockbrokers.

== Early history ==
The hotel was founded in 1751 as a pair of buildings making up a coaching inn on Dawson Street. Following the Acts of Union 1800, the premises became popular with wealthy British and Irish countrymen visiting Dublin. In the early 19th century, the buildings were a coaching business run by Kenny Bourne and Mr Hartley. They were sold to Charles Bianconi in the 1840s, and the hotel became the terminus in Dublin for Bianconi's mail coaches.

== 20th century ==
Paul Besson took over management of the hotel in 1905. He converted the building, adding a Winter Garden and Ballroom, and overhauling the restaurant to provide an improved standard of food. During the early 20th century, the restaurant became known for its haute cuisine.

During the Easter Rising of 1916 and the annexation of the GPO on O'Connell Street, the hotel was used as a centre for the telephone service during that week.

By the 1970s, haute cuisine was falling out of fashion. Despite an extensive renovation in 1980, the fortunes of the hotel continued to decline. In 1982, the owners Trust House Forte decided to close the hotel and sell the land, with the last meal being served on 2 November. The property was demolished in 1984, and redeveloped as The Royal Hibernian Way, a multi-purpose office and shopping complex which fills in the street block from Dawson Street to Duke Lane. This created a pedestrian thoroughfare between Dawson Street and Grafton Street.

When it closed in 1982, the Royal Hibernian was said to be the oldest known hotel in Ireland. Ironically, the Celtic Tiger phenomenon in the 1990s brought the style of hotel like the Royal Hibernian back into fashion.
