= Dame Lane =

Road in Dublin, Ireland

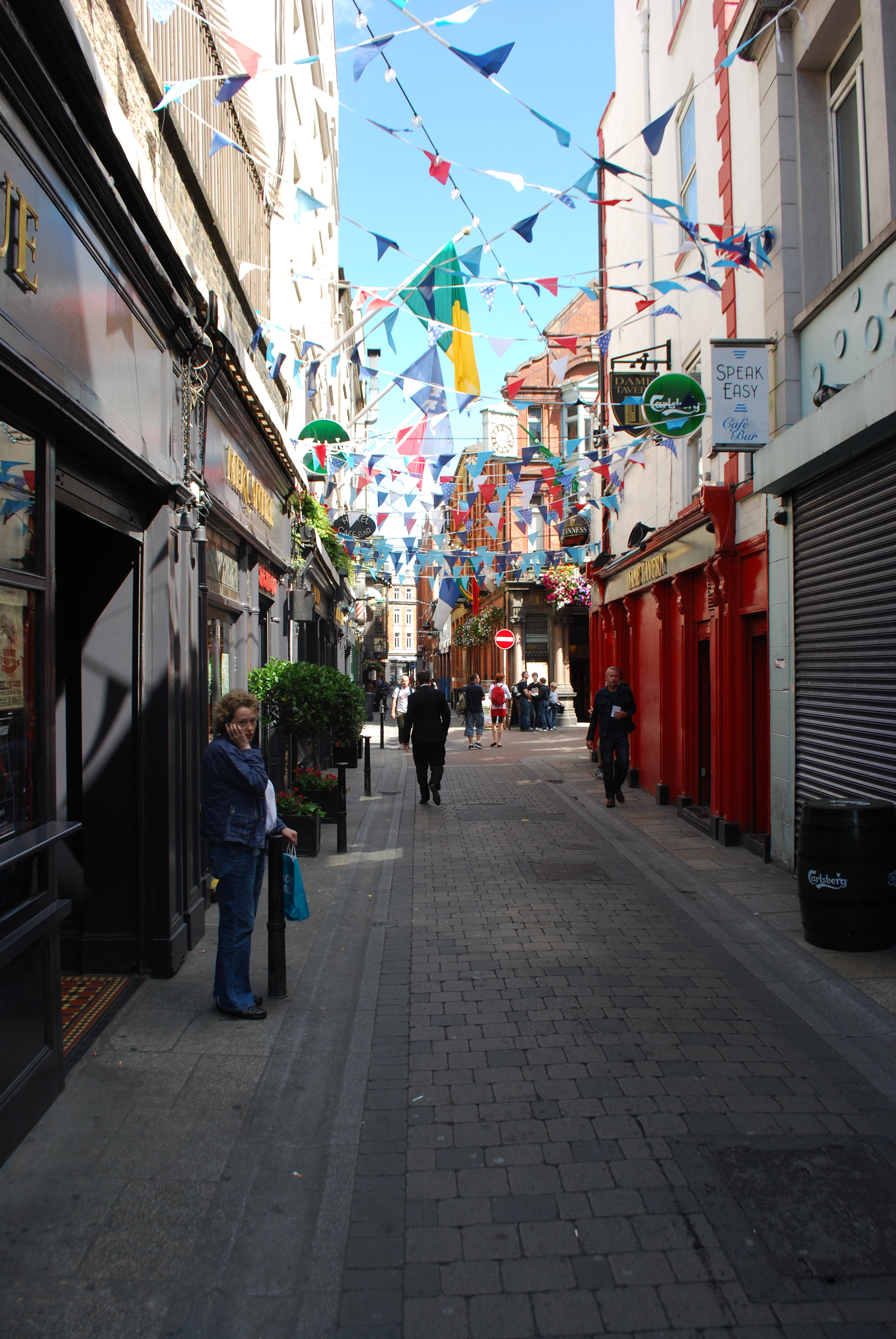

- Location within Central Dublin
- Native name: Lána an Dáma (Irish)
- Namesake: St. Mary del Dam
- Length: 260 m (850 ft)
- Width: 8 metres (26 ft)
- Location: Dublin, Ireland
- Postal code: D02
- Coordinates: 53.343847°N 6.263883°W
- west end: Palace Street
- east end: Trinity Street

Construction
- Inauguration: 1792

Other
- Known for: pubs

Dame Lane (Irish: Lána an Dáma) is a narrow thoroughfare in Dublin, Ireland, with a variety of historical and literary associations.

== Location ==
Dame Lane is located in the south of Dublin's historic city centre, parallel to Dame Street. Temple Bar and College Green are found just north of the street. Dame Lane is close to Dublin Castle, St Andrew's Church (now the Dublin Tourism Office) and Trinity College. The lane stretches from Trinity Street, to Palace Street, across South Great George's Street in an east–west direction. It also runs alongside and close to part of the "Dubline", an historic Dublin tourist walking trail that stretches from College Green to Kilmainham.

== History ==
Dame Lane derives its name from the medieval church of St. Mary del Dam, which was demolished in the 17th century. According to some sources, the name of the church comes from a Poddle dam that originally gave its name to Dam(e) Street and to the eastern gate of the city of Dublin. These are identified as Damas Street and Damas Gate on John Speed's map of 1610. Speed's map also shows a residential area stretching east from the walled city, the old 12th-century St Andrew's Church, and a semi-circular enclosed graveyard near Palace Street. Various spellings appear in different sources and on maps, including Damas, Dammas, Dames, and Dame's.

Dame Street, just to the north, "was the Royal Mile of 18th Century Dublin," linking the castle to the parliament building. Today, Dame Lane dates mainly from the late 18th century, when it was set out as a mews lane as part of the work of the Wide Streets Commission, between 1785 and 1790, in the second phase of its works "for making wide and convenient streets." The section of Dame Lane closest to Dublin Castle follows the line of an older route through the area where the old Castle Market stood, just off what is now South Great George's Street. The re-alignment of this, the oldest part of the existing lane, began in 1782 with the demolition of Castle Market. Dame Lane is shown but described as "unnamed" on Brooking's map of 1728, but is identified on Rocque's later map of 1756.

The old Castle Market, dating from around 1707, was developed by Alderman William Fownes and James Pooley, Esq. and built on the site of the churchyard of the old St Andrew's Church. Some time after 1682, the old St. Andrew's graveyard was obliterated with the construction of the market. This market is shown clearly on Rocque's 1756 map. It featured 34 stalls of butchers, cheesemakers and poulterers, and the map: "shows a marketplace connected to George's street by a narrow laneway. It could be entered from Palace St by another short alleyway known as Dame Lane".

From 1785 to 1790, the newer section of Dame Lane, east of George's Street, replaced an earlier medieval street pattern of "tangled plots and lanes between George's Lane and Trinity Street". Trinity Place, a mainly residential lane and square, existed along this lane for many years in the 19th century, but has long since gone. This was to the south of, and accessed directly from, Dame Lane. In 1818, Trinity Place had 172 residents, and later in Thom's Almanac of 1862 "Trinity-place off Dame-Lane" is listed as having 21 houses, many noted as being in tenements. Dame Lane also had some tenements in 1862, as well as a tavern, provision stores, and various other businesses. The spot where Trinity Place once stood, just off Dame Lane, has historic connections with the construction of a bridewell from 1603 (featured on Speed's map) and from 1616 with Trinity College. "In 1660, Trinity Hall (standing or the ground now occupied by Trinity-place), belonging to Trinity College, was set apart as a medical school".

== Dame Lane in fiction ==
Dame Lane is noted for a connection to Hely's Printing Works, once a significant business presence along Dame Court and Dame Lane. Hely's was a prominent and successful Dublin stationer at nearby 27-30 Dame Street, with an associated large printing works located behind their shop premises. The former printing works, called "Hely’s Acme Works," building by William Mansfield Mitchell dates from 1895 to 1896 and still stands. The Dame Court and Dame Lane buildings remain today and wrap around the Stag's Head pub. Most significantly, it was a former employer of Joyce's character Leopold Bloom in Ulysses. "He read the scarlet letters on their five tall white hats: H.E.L.Y.S." (U 8.125-6). In the novel, Hely's sandwichboard-men wander Dublin and appear in both "The Lestrygonians" and "Wandering Rocks", episodes 8 and 10. In February 2014 part of Dame Lane was transformed for a few days into Victorian London's Pulteney Lane for the gothic horror drama Penny Dreadful.

== Today ==
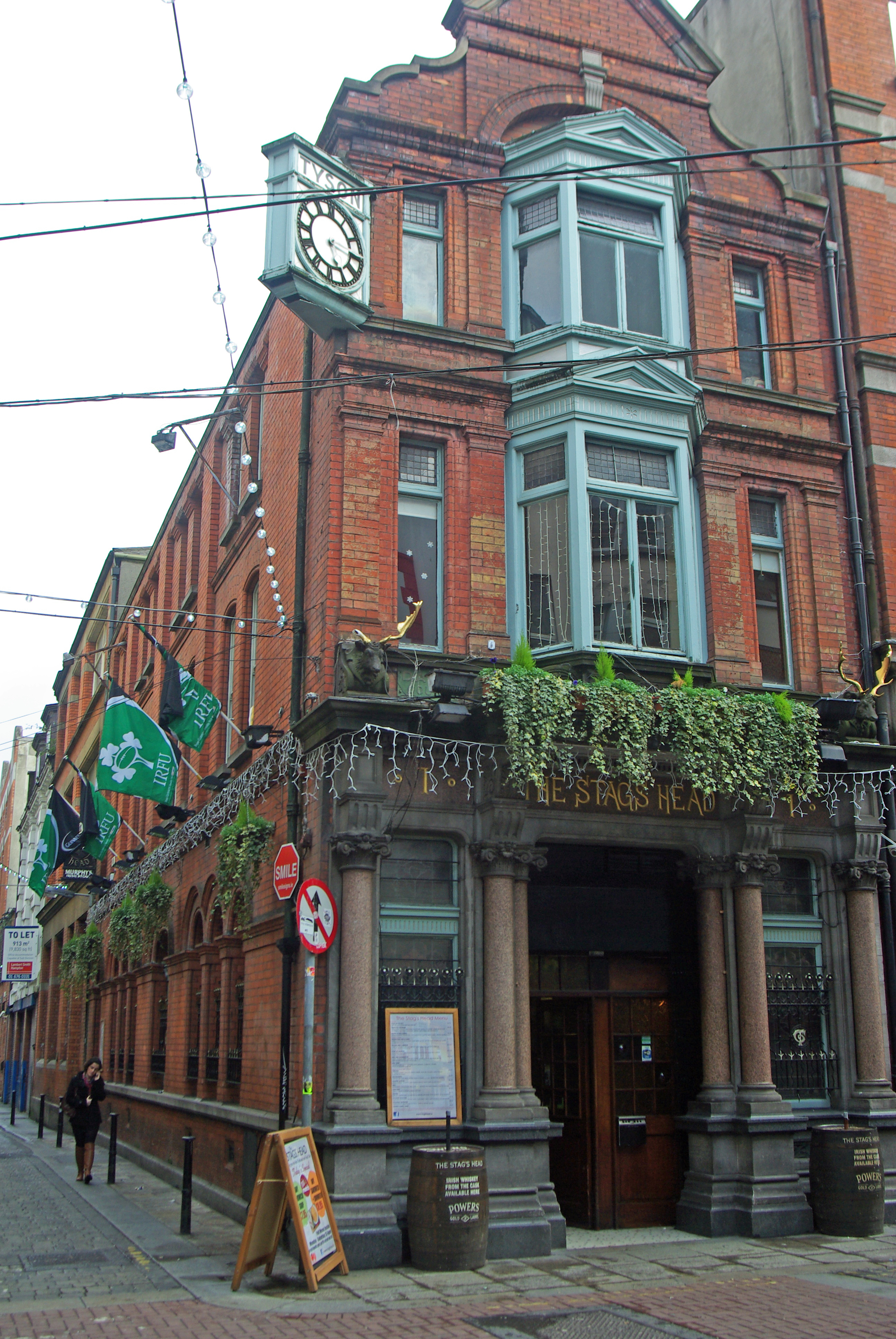
Stag's Head, Dublin 2

The lane is part of a small area bounded by South Great George's Street and Dame Street. It is branded "Dame District." This is promoted by a group of local businesses in both Dame Court and Dame Lane "as an area for socializing and entertainment." The most significant landmark today on Dame Lane is The Stag's Head, a mostly intact public bar built on the site of older taverns dating from the 1780s. The Stag's Head was re-built in 1895 in "redbrick with Italianate detail" by businessman George Tyson and architect Alfred McGloughlin in high Victorian style with mahogany, stained glass and mirrors. It is "elaborately decorated inside and out." This building sits on the corner of Dame Court and Dame Lane. This replaced an older bar from the 1830s known as John Bull's Albion Hotel and Tavern.

The lane is also notable for the Universal Hair Clinic's "Why Go Bald?" sign on the corner of South Great George's Street, reputedly a favourite Dublin landmark of Bono. The sign dates from 1961 and was refurbished by Taylor Signs in 1999, following representations from the Twentieth Century Trust. From 2013 to 2018, 5 Dame Lane was the location of Fumbally Exchange, a not-for-profit community of design professionals. The building at No. 5 Dame Lane dates from 1906 and was built as part of an extension to the Hely's Acme Printing Works. Architectural historian Christine Casey refers to the date of 1906 when Batchelor & Hicks used the Hennebique "system of re-inforced concrete framing reputedly employed here for the first time in Dublin". (p. 415) The building was added to the Dublin City Council Record of Protected Structures in 2017.

== Sources ==
- Pearson, Peter (2000). The Heart of Dublin: Resurgence of an Historic City. Dublin: O'Brien Press.
