= The Stag's Head =

Pub in Dublin, Ireland

Coordinates: 53.34378°N 6.26366°W

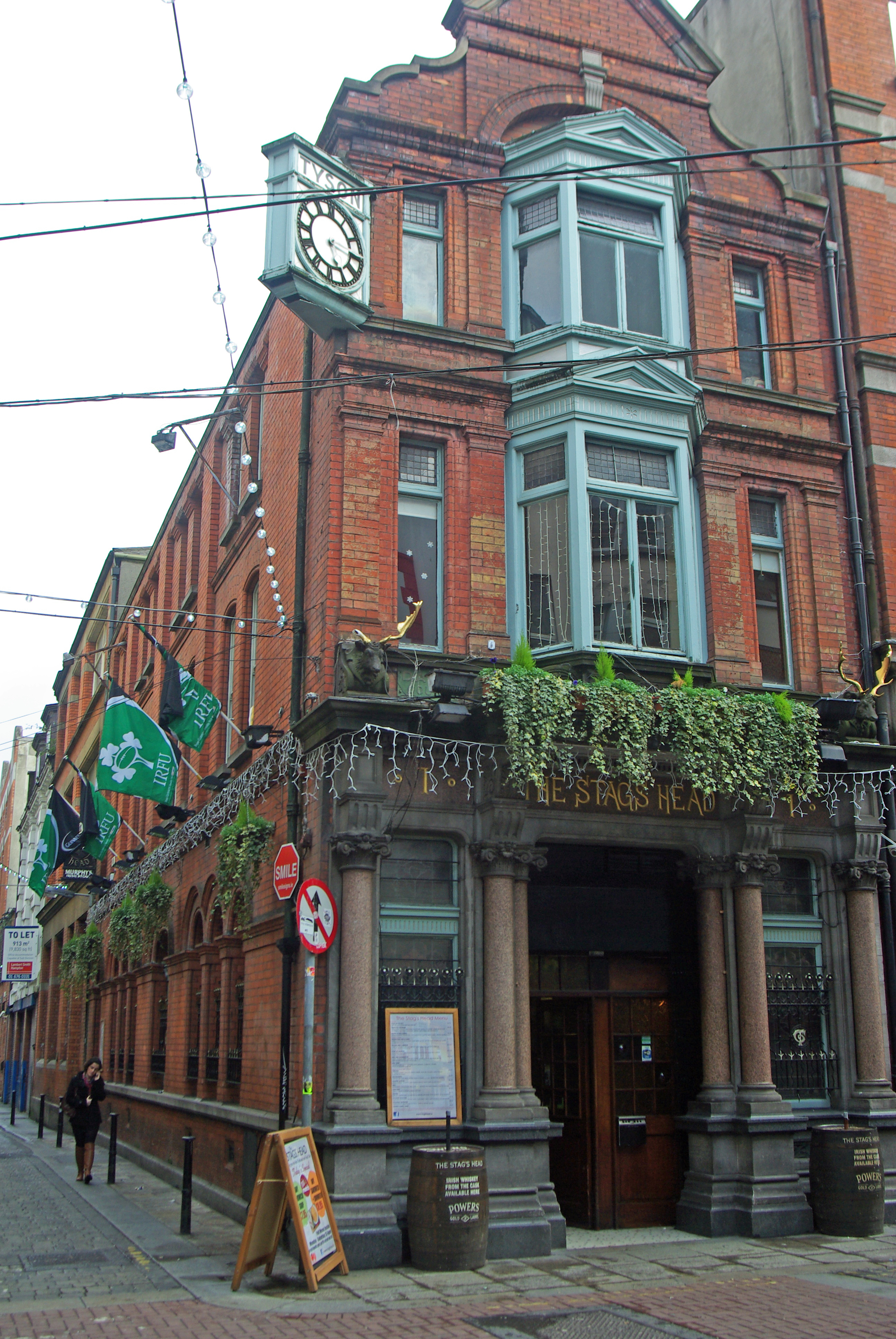
The Stag's Head on Dame Court

The Stag's Head is a pub on the corner of Dame Court and Dame Lane in Dublin, Ireland.

Records of a pub on the site of the Stag's Head date to 1770 (original construction by a Mr. Tyson) and 1895 (extensive rebuilding). The pub is known for the preservation of its Victorian interior and the restored advertising mosaic on the footpath on Dame Street, some distance from the pub's doors.

The name "Tyson", and Mr. Tyson's initials, decorate the old clock and the wrought iron of the exterior. Mr. Tyson is also believed to have contributed to the construction of a permanent pavement over Dame Lane.

There is a stuffed fox on the ground floor snug of the pub, while a large stag's head decorates the main bar.

The pub has appeared in many films, notably A Man of No Importance, starring Albert Finney and Educating Rita starring Michael Caine and Julie Walters. Filming for Penny Dreadful also took place both inside and outside the pub in February 2014.

The establishment was sold in 2005 for €5.8M and bought by the Louis Fitzgerald Group. A number of changes have made to the pub since the sale, most notably the introduction of a television set to the bar area.
