= Dawson Street =

Street in central Dublin

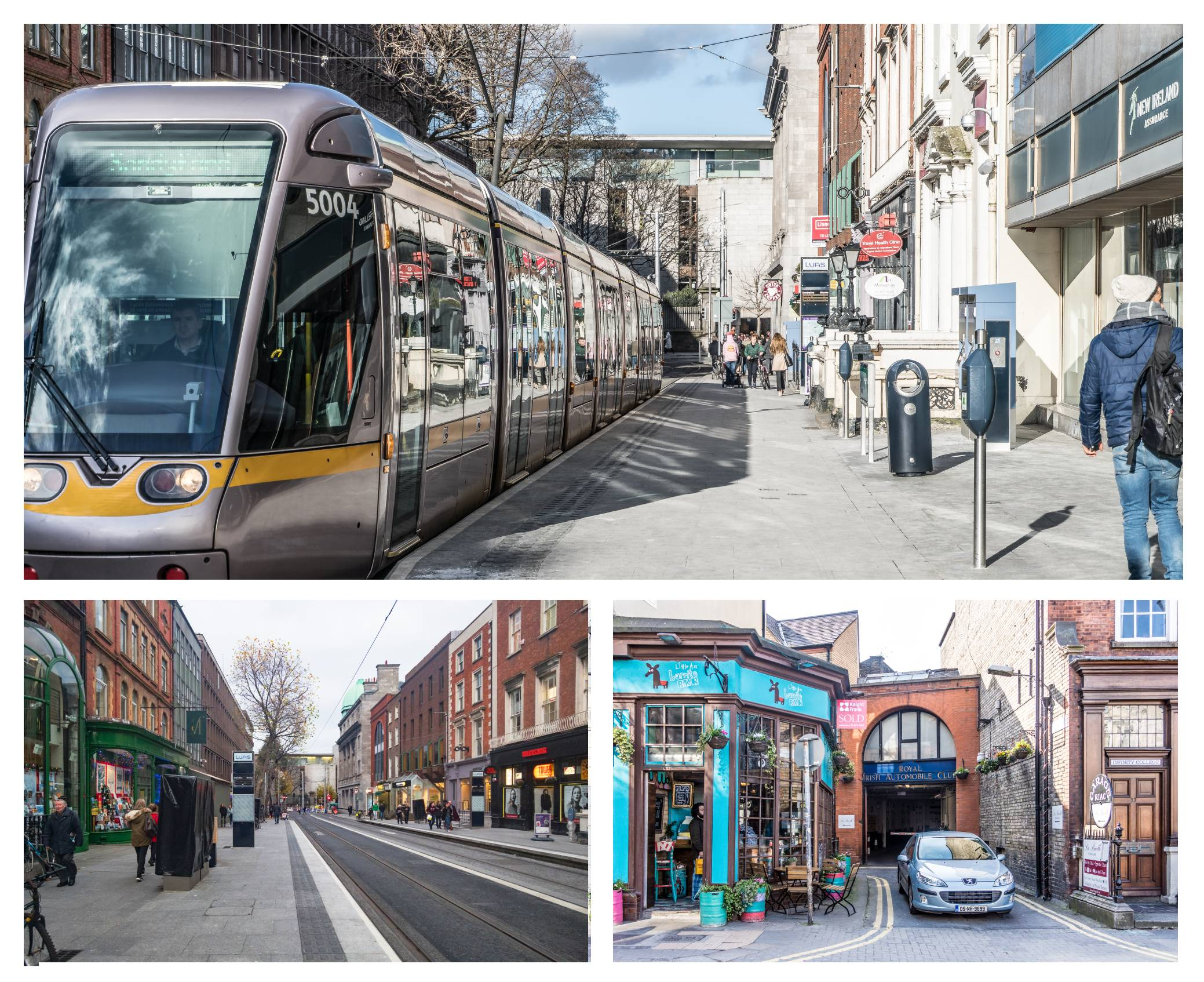
- Dawson Street

- Location within Central Dublin
- Native name: Sráid Dásain (Irish)
- Namesake: Joshua Dawson
- Length: 400 m (1,300 ft)
- Width: 14 metres (46 ft)
- Location: Dublin, Ireland
- Postal code: D02
- Coordinates: 53°20′28″N 6°15′30″W
- north end: Nassau Street
- south end: St Stephen's Green North

Other
- Known for: Mansion House, cafés, nightclubs, St. Ann's Church

Dawson Street (/ˈdɔːsən/; Irish: Sráid Dásain) is a street on the southern side of central Dublin, running from St Stephen's Green to the walls of Trinity College Dublin. It is the site of the residence of the Lord Mayor of Dublin, the Mansion House.

== Location ==
Dawson Street runs parallel to Grafton Street from St Stephen's Green to Nassau Street. It is connected to Grafton Street by Duke Street and South Anne Street. Much of the street is a shopping thoroughfare. Molesworth Street links the street to Kildare Street. The street has a slight slope downwards from its Stephen's Green end to its Trinity end. Traffic flows one way, northwards.

== History ==
The street was named after Joshua Dawson, who in 1705 acquired land from Henry Temple and Hugh Price. He laid out the street in 1707 along the estate's east edge, as well as the nearby Grafton, Anne, and Harry Streets which were part of the estate. By 1728, the street was complete. At the point of construction, it was a wide roadway and considered one of the best in Dublin.

Dawson Street was originally residential. Some original properties were replaced with larger houses around 1760-1770. During the 19th century, commercial properties began to be developed on the street, and in the late 20th, these were converted or replaced with office blocks.

== Buildings and businesses ==
The Mansion House, the official residence of the Lord Mayor of Dublin, lies near the southern end of the street. It was constructed by Dawson in 1710, but sold to Dublin Corporation on 25 April 1715 for £3,500, as a residence for the Lord Mayor. A portico was added to the entrance in the 19th century. The round room alongside the Mansion House was constructed over six weeks in 1821 for George IV. The house has undergone several reconstructions, including external plastering of the original brick walls, and has been used for function rooms, and as a restaurant. A large office block was constructed to the right of Mansion House in 2002.

Saint Ann's Church is found on the eastern side, almost halfway along. Northland House was at No. 19 Dawson Street, and constructed in 1770 for the Knox family. It was bought by the Royal Irish Academy in 1851 and renamed Academy House. Near the northern end is the bookshop Hodges Figgis, founded in 1768.

The Dawson Lounge, Dublin's smallest pub, is located near the Stephen's Green end of the street.

== Famous inhabitants ==
The eminent architect, Jacob Owen, lived at 27 Dawson Street in the 1860s. Noted Irish ecclesiastical architect William Hague had his office at 50 Dawson Street, as did architect Thomas Francis McNamara (also at No. 50 and No. 5).

== Redevelopment ==
From the 1960s onwards many of the Georgian and Victorian buildings on the street were demolished in favour of modern retail and office units. One such development was on the corner of Dawson Street and Nassau Street by the Norwich Union Group. A collection of 15 Georgian and Victorian buildings were demolished, including the original Elverys Sports corner store and the 1870 McCurdy's Law Club. The new 5-storey t-shaped office block with street-level retail units was designed by Lardner and Partners. The new building, completed in 1967 was called Nassau House. Permission was granted to demolish this block in 2016, and the construction of a replacement mixed-use development is due for completion in 2022.

The Royal Hibernian Hotel was a prominent landmark on the street, and at one point was the oldest hotel in Ireland, opening in 1751. It was popular with wealthy country dwellers and frequented by British Army officers in the 19th century, but gradually declined at the start of the 20th. It was sold in 1982 by the owners, Trust House Forte and demolished two years later, only 4 years after an extensive renovation. The hotel was replaced with a large mixed-use development, the Royal Hibernian Way, completed in 1987.

== Transport ==
Dawson Luas stop is on the Luas Cross City extension. The line links the Red and Green lines going from Broombridge in North Dublin (interchange with Irish Rail station) and St. Stephen's Green Green Line stop. Construction started in June 2013 with services beginning on 9 December 2017.

== See also ==
- List of streets and squares in Dublin
