= Dawson Lounge =

Pub in Dublin, Ireland

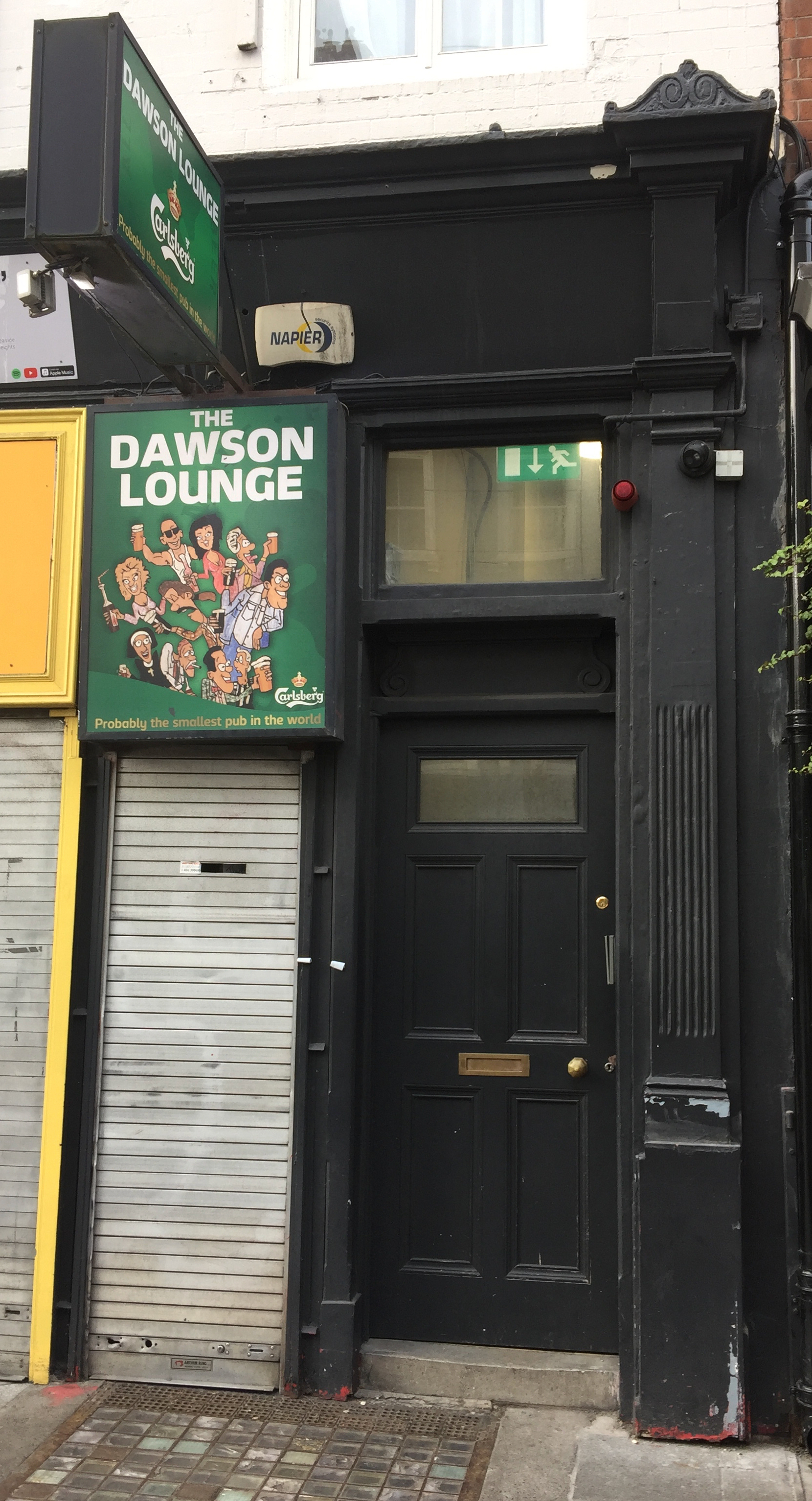
- Dawson Lounge entrance in December 2021
- Interactive map of the Dawson Lounge area

General information
- Location: 25 Dawson Street, Dublin 2, Dublin, Ireland
- Coordinates: 53.33976°N 6.25887°W

Design and construction
- Known for: Being the smallest pub in Dublin

The Dawson Lounge is the smallest pub in Dublin. Located in a basement near the St Stephen's Green end of Dawson Street, it has a capacity of 40 people.
