= Eamonn Doran's =

Former bar and music venue in Dublin

Coordinates: 53.34534°N 6.262693°W

- Dorans
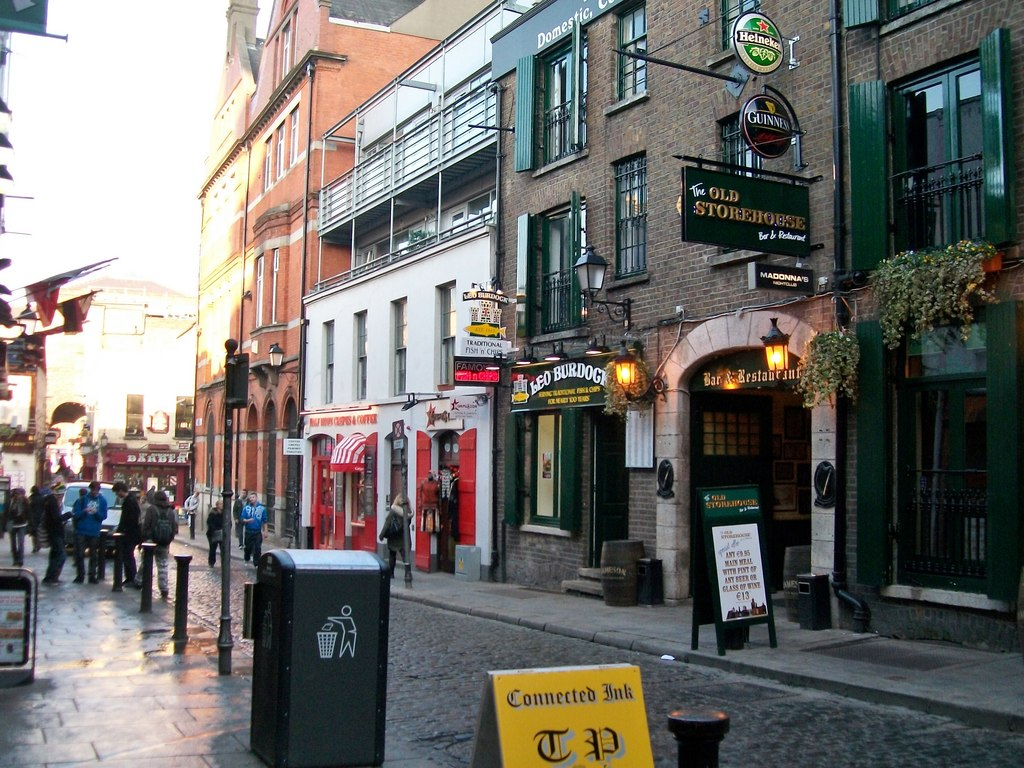
- The Old Storehouse Bar and Restaurant, formerly Eamonn Doran's
- Interactive map of Eamonn Doran's
- Former names: The Rock Garden
- Address: 3 Crown Alley, Temple Bar; Dublin; Ireland
- Type: bar and music venue

Construction
- Closed: December 2009

Eamonn Doran's (formerly known as The Rock Garden) was a bar and music venue located in Dublin's Temple Bar. The venue also had an adjacent pizza parlour, Di Fontaine's, which was part-owned by Huey Morgan of the Fun Lovin' Criminals.

== History ==
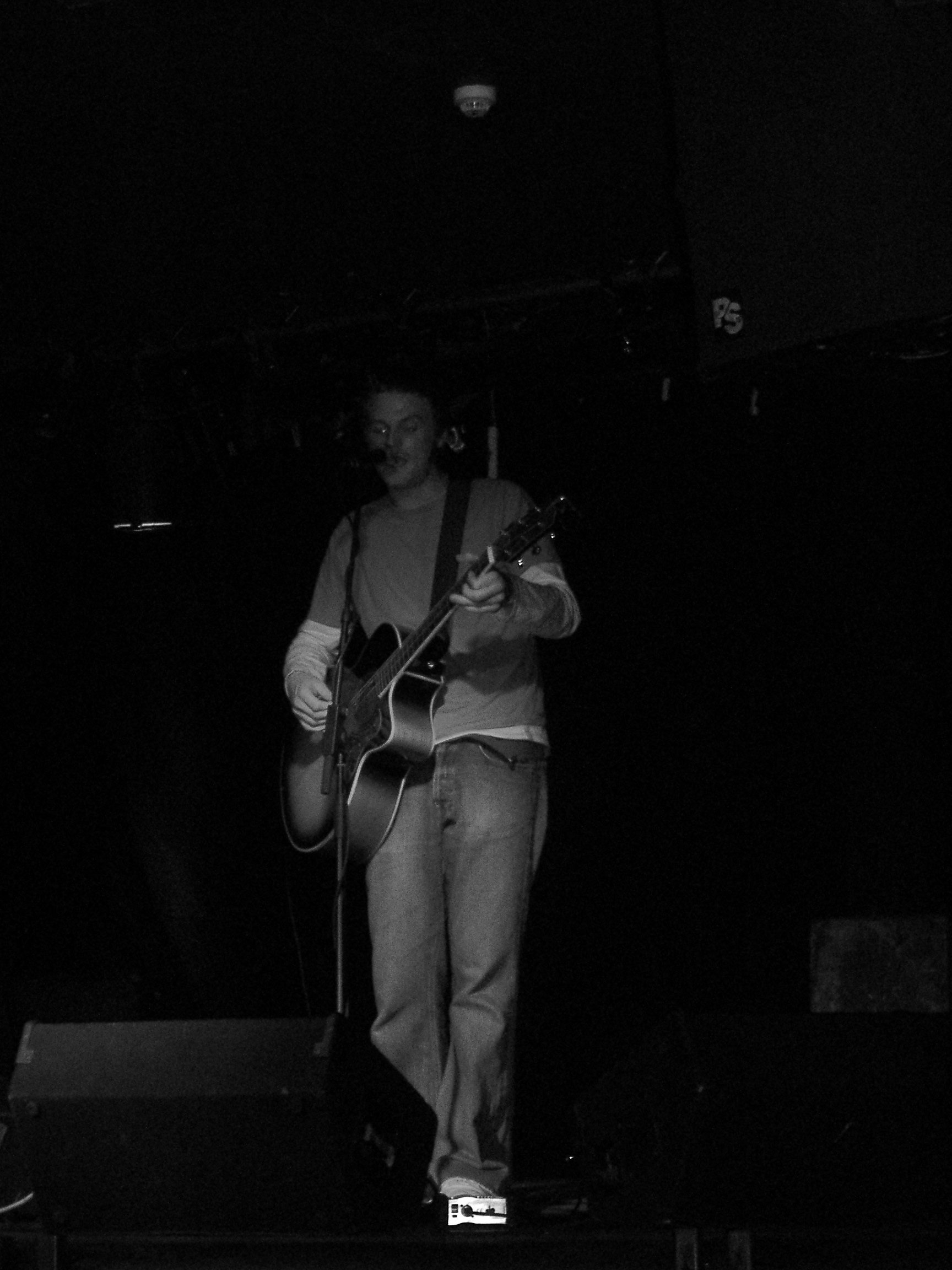
Rob Smith at Eamonn Doran's in 2005

As The Rock Garden, The Cranberries, Mundy, Paddy Casey, Damien Dempsey, Joy Zipper, Republic Of Loose started off playing there. In 1993, Radiohead played their first-ever Irish gig at the venue.

The venue was renamed Eamonn Doran's in the late 1990s. TFI Friday broadcast its 2000 St. Patrick's Day episode from the venue, where Chris Evans interviewed members of U2, The Corrs and actor James Nesbitt.

In 2009, the venue went into liquidation with debts of €917,000, including over €600,000 in unpaid taxes. Director Dermot Doran cited trading difficulties and a failed investment deal, after which the landlord reclaimed the premises and licence, forcing the business to cease trading. The venue left behind unpaid debts to creditors, including IMRO and former employees.
