= The Liberties, Dublin =

Historic area of central Dublin, Ireland

The Liberties Na Saoirsí (Irish)
- Neighbourhood
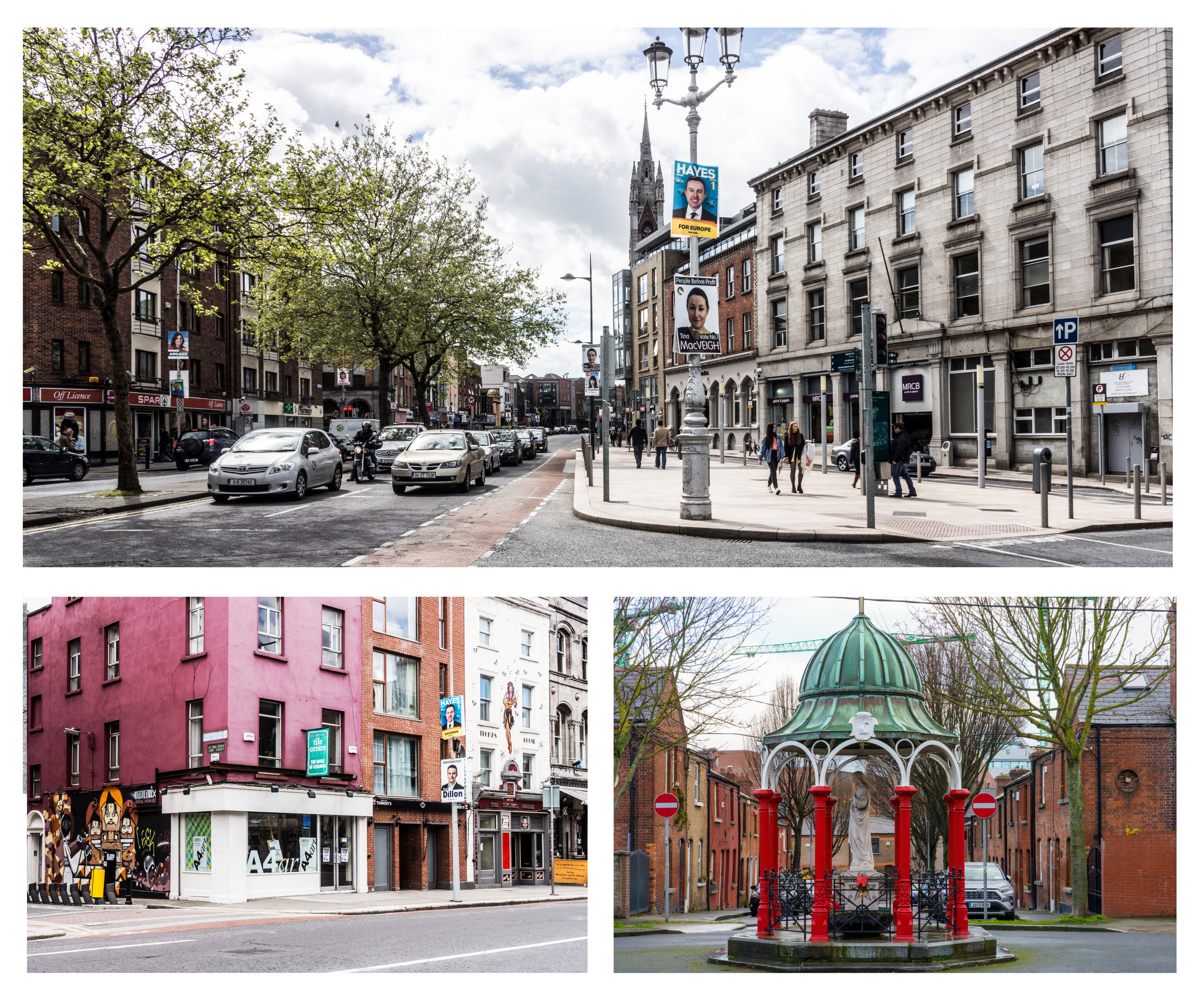
- Clockwise from top: The Cornmarket area near Thomas Street; a Reginald Street Catholic emancipation memorial that once housed a tribute to Queen Victoria; shops and bars on Thomas Street
- Interactive map of The Liberties
- Location in Dublin
- Coordinates: 53°20′36″N 6°16′53″W
- Country: Ireland
- Province: Leinster
- County: County Dublin
- Local authority: Dublin City Council
- LEA: South West Inner City
- Dáil Constituency: Dublin South-Central
- Time zone: UTC+0 (WET)
  - Summer (DST): UTC+1 (IST (WEST))
- Eircode routing key: D08
- Website: www.libertiesdublin.ie

The Liberties (Irish: Na Saoirsí or occasionally Na Libirtí) is an area in central Dublin, Ireland, located in the southwest of the inner city. Formed from various areas of special manorial jurisdiction, initially separate from the main city government, it is one of Dublin's most historic working class neighbourhoods. The area was traditionally associated with the River Poddle, market traders and local family-owned businesses, as well as the Guinness brewery, whiskey distilling, and, historically, the textiles industry and tenement housing.

== Etymology ==
The name derives from manorial jurisdictions dating from the arrival of the Anglo-Normans in the 12th century. They were lands united to the city, but still preserving their own jurisdiction (hence "liberties"). The most important of these liberties were the Liberty of St. Sepulchre, under the Archbishop of Dublin, and the Liberty of Thomas Court and Donore belonging to the Abbey of St. Thomas the Martyr (later called the Earl of Meath's Liberty). The modern Liberties area lies within the former boundaries of these two jurisdictions, between the river Liffey to the north, St. Patrick's Cathedral to the east, Warrenmount to the south and the St. James's Hospital campus to the west.

== History ==
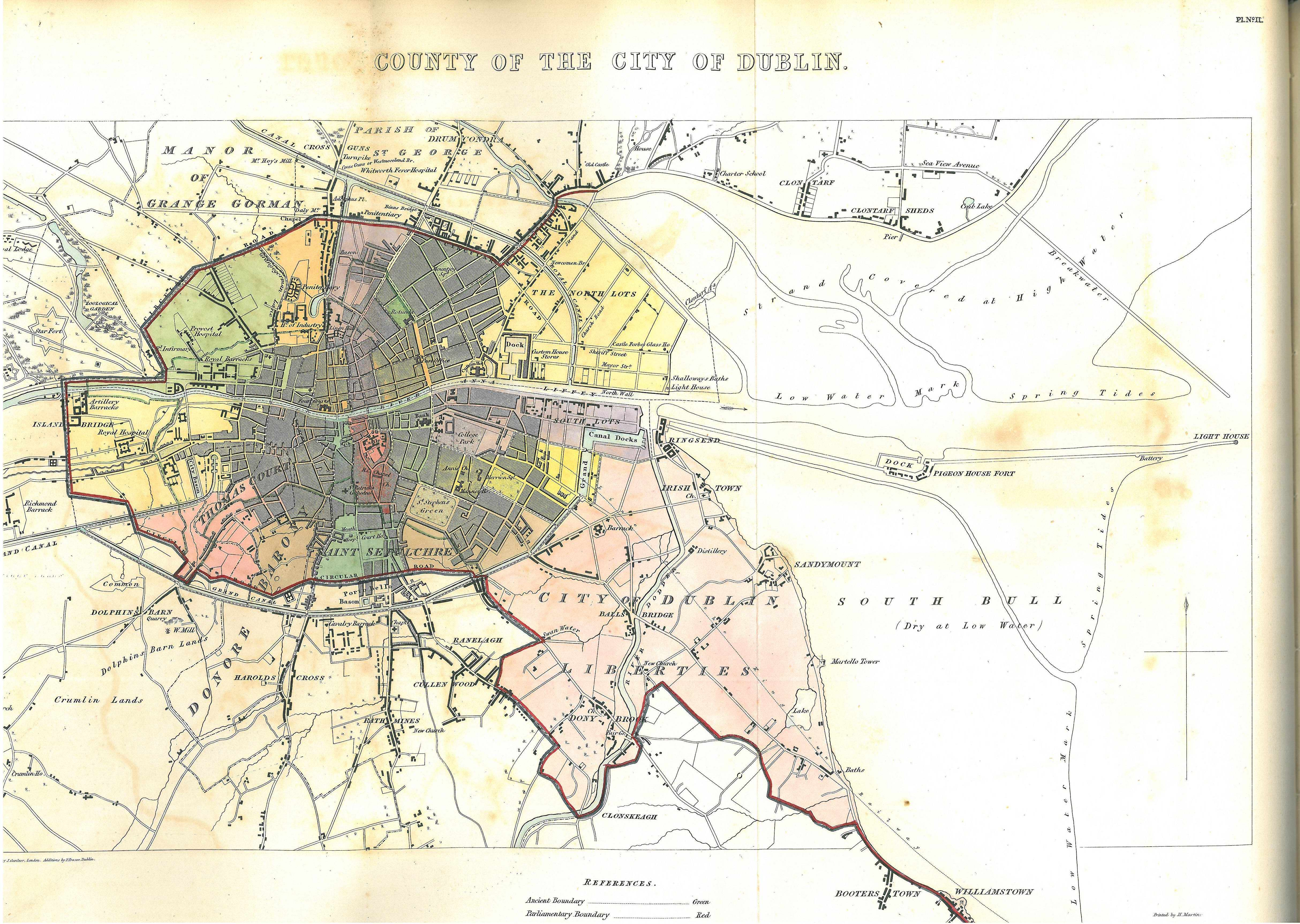
An 1837 map of Dublin and environs, showing:
- The manor of Grange Gorman (outside the municipal boundary to the north)
- The barony of Saint Sepulchre (Saint Patrick's liberty and that part of the manor of Saint Sepulchre outside the municipal boundary)
- The barony of Donore (outside the municipal boundary)
- The liberty of Thomas Court (inside the municipal boundary)
- The "city of Dublin liberties" — outside the municipal boundary but inside the county of the city. This area (from 1842 the barony of Dublin) is distinct from the "liberties adjoining Dublin", which were and are popularly called "the Liberties".

=== Historical location ===
These two liberties are mentioned in Allen's Register of 1529, but without describing their exact location. After the dissolution of the monasteries by Henry VIII, the liberties of Thomas Court and Donore were granted to William Brabazon, ancestor of the Earls of Meath. In 1579 the city of Dublin claimed the abbey to be within the jurisdiction and liberty of the city, but they lost their case. From then on the head of the liberty was the Earl of Meath. The family lent its name to places and streets in the district, e.g. the Meath Market, the Meath Hospital and Meath Street. They also named Brabazon Row, Brabazon Street and Ardee Street (they were Barons Ardee since 1616).

In 1728 Charles Brooking published a detailed map, the Map of the City and Suburbs of Dublin, which contained a description of the boundaries of the liberties. The Manor of St. Sepulchre boundaries stretched from Bishop St. to St. Stephen's Green, along Harcourt Street to Donnybrook, across Rathgar to Harold's Cross and back along Clanbrassil Street to Patrick Street. The Earl of Meath's liberty ran west along The Coombe to Ardee St., turning north towards Echlin St. then along James's Street to Meath Street, then through various smaller streets to Ash St. and back to the Coombe.

In 1837 the Ordnance Survey started developing its maps, and that of Dublin published in 1840 showed all the liberties, from the smallest (Christ Church Liberty, one acre and two roods) to the largest (the Earl of Meath's Liberty, 380 acres).

=== Privileges ===
In return for the support of the ruler of the liberty, or to alleviate certain hardships suffered by Englishmen or the church in Ireland, privileges were granted to the rulers of the liberties at various times and by various kings of England. For example, these allowed the liberty of St. Sepulchre to have its own courts of justice (Courts Leet, Courts Baron and a Court of Record, where it was allowed to try all crimes except "forestalling, rape, treasure-trove and arson"), free customs, freedom from certain taxes and services, impose their own fines, have their own coroners, rights of salvage, maintain their own fairs and markets, regulate weights and measures, etc. These rights and privileges ended in 1840.

=== Historical developments ===
Several places in The Liberties still have connections with a turbulent past in which political upheaval or dire poverty were the order of the day. In the 17th century, parts of the area became relatively wealthy when the weaving crafts of the immigrant Huguenots had a ready market around the present-day Meath Street Market, and a healthy export trade.

=== 17th and 18th centuries ===
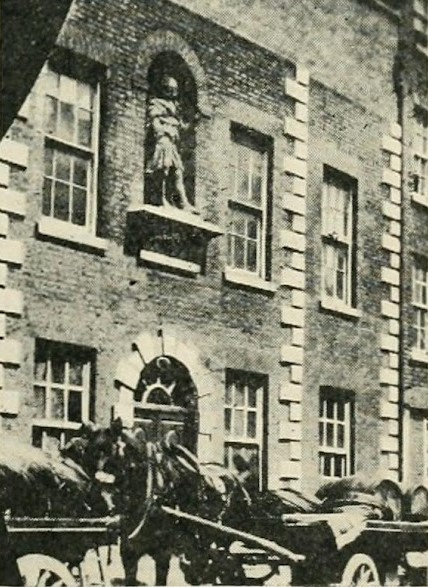
The Weaver's Hall, The Coombe, 1908

In the late 17th century, development started in order to house the weavers who were moving into the area. Woollen manufacture was set up by settlers from England, while many Huguenots took up silk weaving, using skills they had acquired in their home country, France. They constructed their own traditional style of house, Dutch Billies, with gables that faced the street. Thousands of weavers became employed in the Coombe, Pimlico, Spitalfields and Weavers' Square.

However, English woollen manufacturers felt threatened by the Irish industry, and heavy duties were imposed on Irish wool exports. The Navigation Act was passed to prevent the Irish from exporting to the whole colonial market, then in 1699 the English government passed the Wool Act, which prevented export to any country whatsoever, which effectively put an end to the industry in the Liberties.

A weavers' hall was built by the Weavers' Guild in the Lower Coombe in 1682. In 1745 a new hall was provided, financed by the Huguenot, David Digges La Touche. In 1750 the Guild erected a statue of George II on the front of their hall "as a mark of their sincere loyalty". The hall was demolished in 1965.

In the eighteenth century a revival took place, based on importation of Spanish wool, helped from 1775 by the Royal Dublin Society, but the events of 1798 and 1803, in which many weavers in the Liberties took part, and the economic decline that set in after the Act of Union, prevented any further growth in this industry in the Liberties.

Similarly, the successful growth of the silk and poplin industries, which was supported by the Royal Dublin Society in the second half of the 18th century, was hindered by an act passed by the Irish government in 1786, which prevented the society from supporting any house where Irish silk goods were sold. When war was declared against France under Napoleon, and raw materials were difficult to obtain, the silk weavers suffered greatly. The final blow came in the 1820s when the British government did away with the tariffs imposed upon imported silk products.

From this time on, many of the once-prosperous houses in the Liberties became poverty-stricken tenements housing the unemployed and destitute.

=== 19th century ===
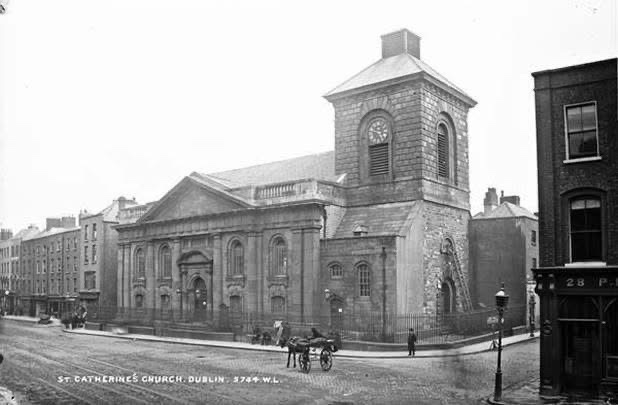
St Catherine's Church, Thomas Street

The Tenter House was erected in 1815 in Cork Street, financed by Thomas Pleasants. Before this, the poor weavers of the Liberties had either to suspend work in rainy weather or use the alehouse fire and thus were (as George Newenham Wright expresses it) "exposed to great distress, and not unfrequently reduced either to the hospital or the gaol". The Tenter House was a brick building 275 feet (84 m) long, three storeys high, and with a central cupola. It had a form of central heating powered by four furnaces, and provided a place for weavers to stretch their material in bad weather.

Part of the area was redeveloped into affordable housing and parkland by the Iveagh Trust, the Dublin Artisans Dwellings Company and Dublin City Council in the early to mid-twentieth century.

The Ordnance Survey recorded the following areas within the county of the city of Dublin in the 1830s:

Area of Dublin liberties in 1837–43
Liberty	Civil parishes	Area
Donore	St Catherine's (part); St Luke's (part)	377.875 acres (152.921 ha)
Thomas Court	St Catherine's (part)	92.625 acres (37.484 ha)
St Sepulchre's	St Nicholas Without (part); St Peter's (part)	9.025 acres (3.652 ha)
St Patrick's	Liberty of St Patrick's	183.14375 acres (74.11565 ha)
Christchurch	Liberty of Christchurch	1.61875 acres (0.65508 ha)

In 1875, a fire broke out in a malt house and warehouse that caused 13 casualties entirely due to alcohol poisoning from the whiskey that flowed through the streets. The lack of significantly more casualties is attributed to the fact that one of the first buildings to be caught in the blaze was a pigsty that sent screaming livestock through the streets to warn residents.

=== 20th century to present day ===
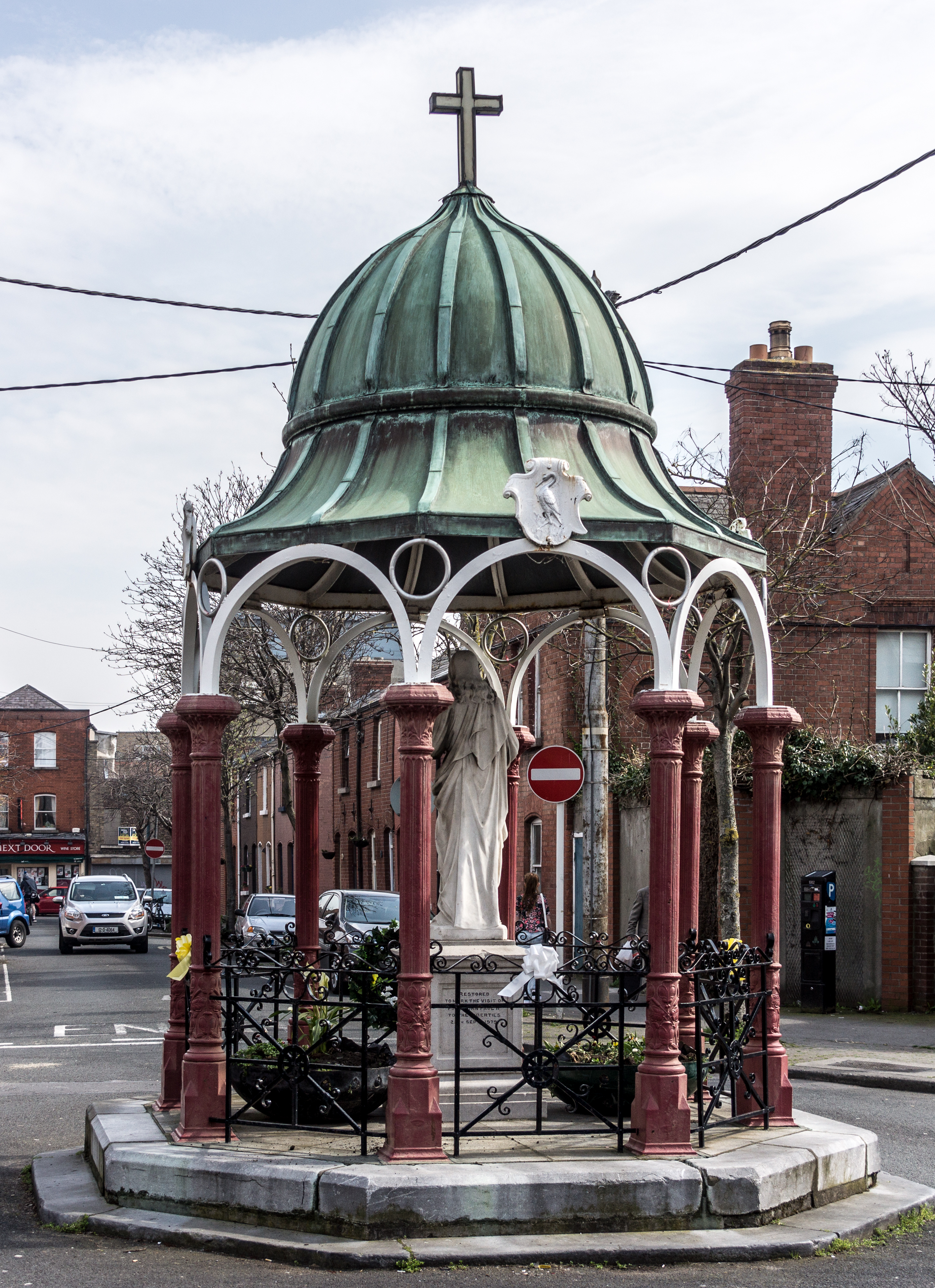
Catholic Emancipation memorial at the junction of Reginald Street and Gray Street (1929)

The urban fabric of the Liberties was significantly altered by the road widening schemes of the 20th century, which impacted on High Street, Bridgefoot Street, Bridge Street, Winetavern Street and Clanbrassil Street. As early as 1941 there were plans to widen Cork Street, leading to buildings being left to fall into decay while the threat of compulsory purchase orders seemed possible.

The road widening was eventually completed in 2003 and there followed an extensive reconstruction of the street including landmark residential buildings by O'Donnell & Tuomey Architects and FKL Architects and the development of a new park, Weaver Park, by Áit Urbanism + Landscape.

== Culture ==
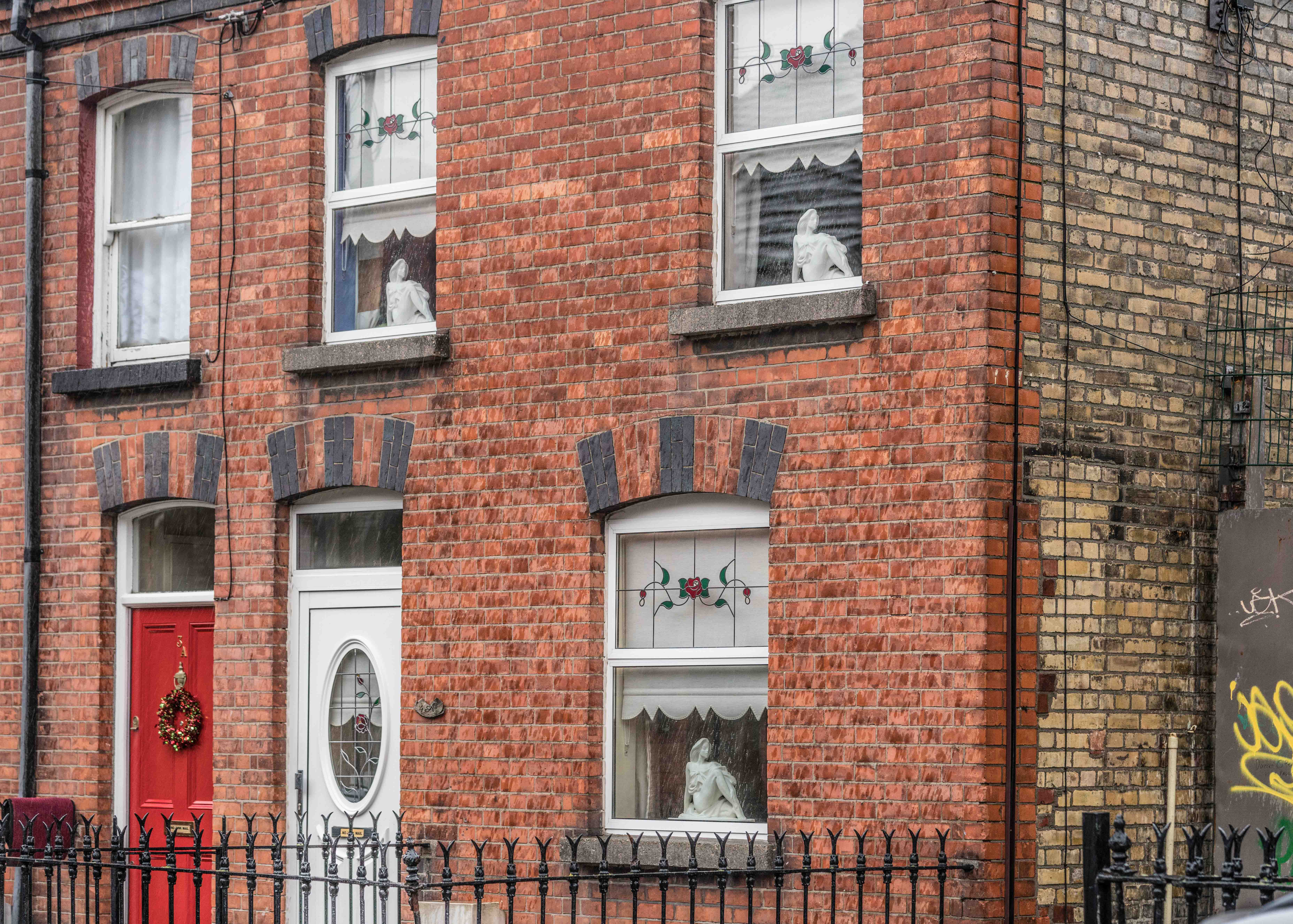
Typical brick housing, displaying Lady on the Rock figurines

The Liberties holds a range of cultural centres, and forms part of the wider Dublin 8 area, home to five of Ireland's top visitor attractions, with the Guinness Storehouse alone accounting for 1.2 million annual visits.

Thomas Street is home to the country's largest art college, the National College of Art and Design (NCAD). The college, which was founded in 1746 as a private drawing school, is now a constituent college of University College Dublin, and NCAD degrees and awards are validated by UCD.

The Liberties is home to several art galleries, including that at NCAD, along with private sector projects such as Basic Space, Pallas Projects, Cross Gallery, and the Jam Art Factory. Nearby is the Irish Museum of Modern Art in the Royal Hospital Kilmainham.

The Irish language youth radio station, Raidió Rí-Rá, broadcasts from a studio at Fumbally Exchange, in the Liberties and the visual arts organisation, MART, has studios on Malpas Street.

== Entertainment ==
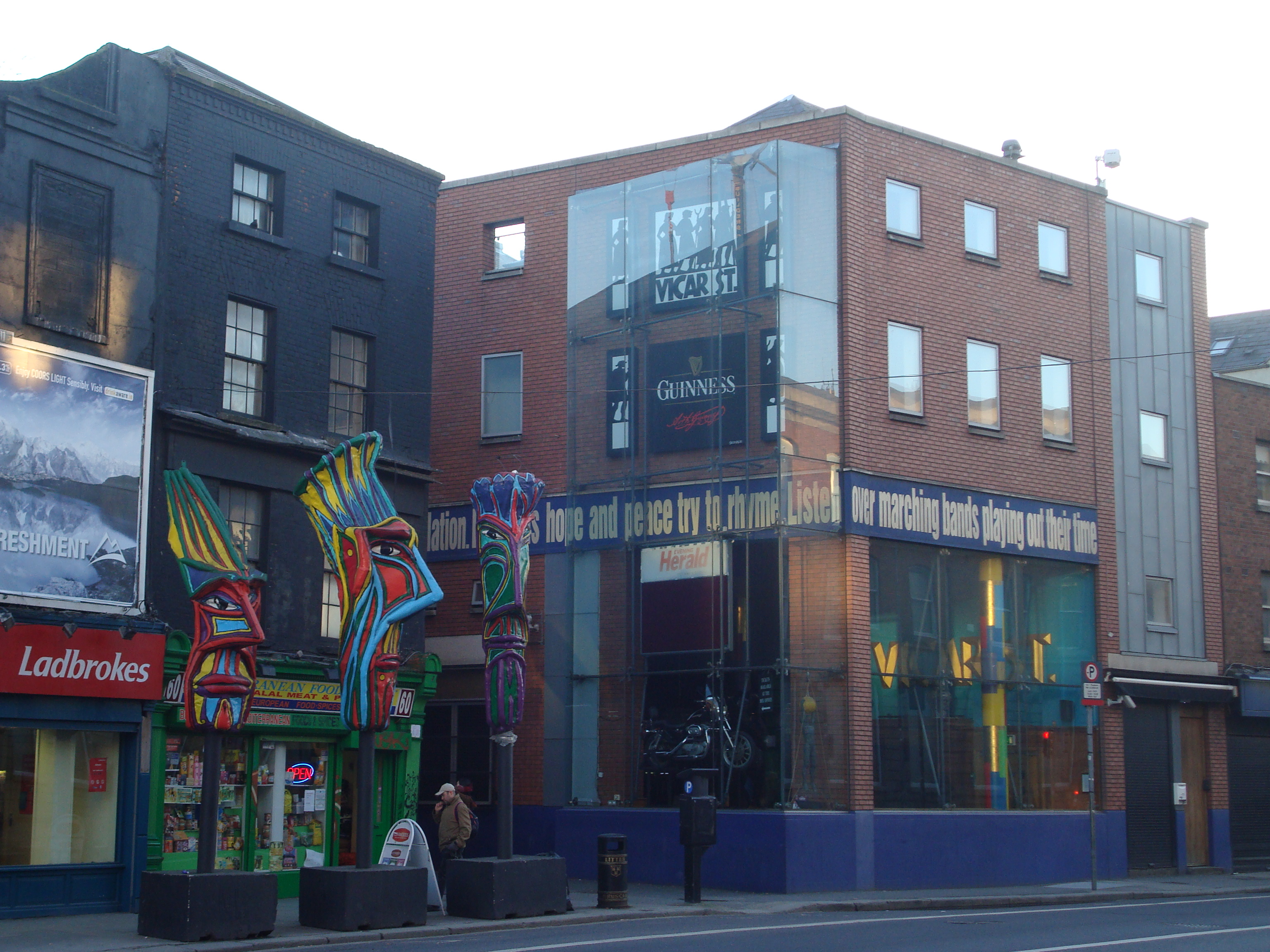
The Vicar Street venue on Thomas Street

The Liberties is home to several theatres, bars, music venues, nightclubs and entertainment venues. Music venues include Vicar Street, on Thomas Street, hosting comedy, drama and concerts, with capacity for 1,500, and The Thomas House, specialised in punk, rock and reggae music.

The Liberties Festival, first run in the early 1970s, includes sporting and community events as well as a multi-cultural and arts programme encompassing visual art, film, dance, comedy, literature and music. Many of the events held during the festival are free. The festival is a South Inner City Community Development Association (SICCDA) project and is supported by Dublin City Council, the local community, and several private sponsors, including Diageo.

== Economy ==
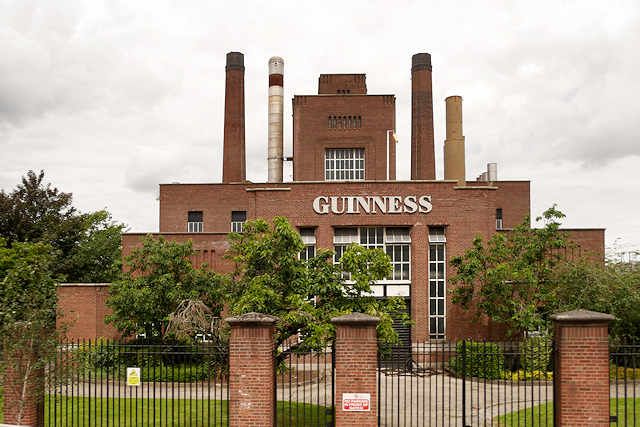
Guinness St James's Gate Brewery

=== Brewing and distilling ===
The Liberties is the home of the Guinness Brewery, which is owned by parent company Diageo. The Guinness Storehouse, part of the Guinness (St. James's Gate) Brewery site, is Ireland's most-visited paid visitor attraction.

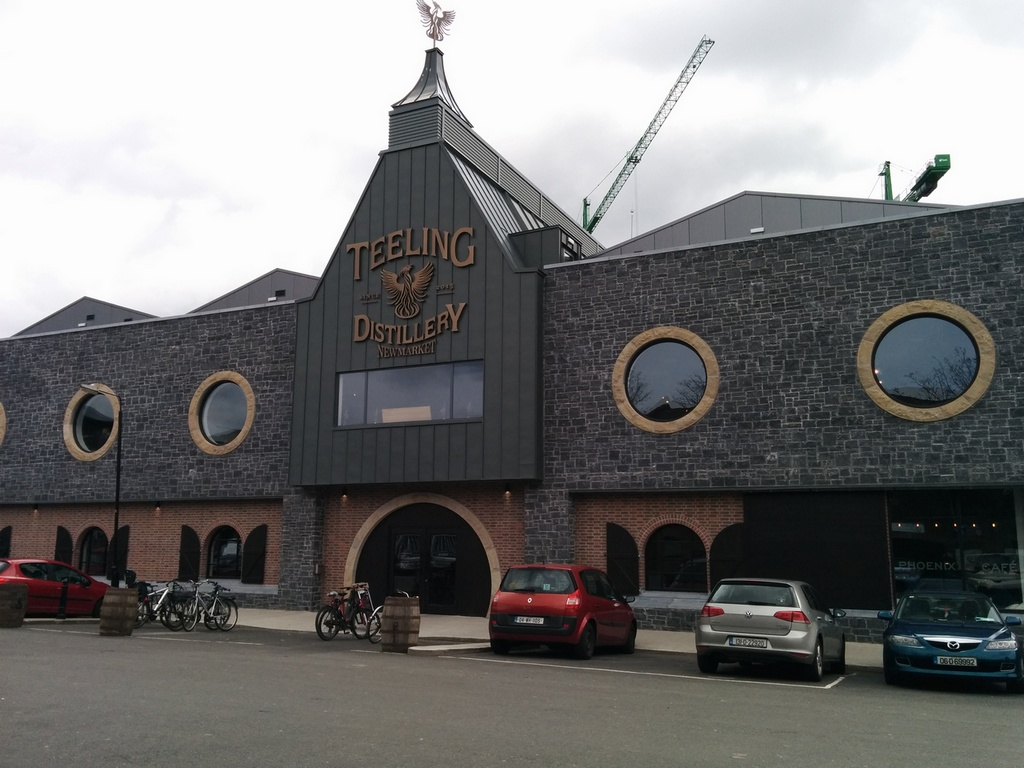
Teeling distillery, Newmarket

While many local breweries and distilleries closed after the late 19th century, as of the early 21st century the area has seen some renewal as a centre for craft distilling and brewing in Dublin. Teelings Whiskey opened a new distillery and visitor centre in Newmarket, the first new Irish whiskey distillery to develop in Dublin since the 19th century, while investment has also been made in The Liberties by the Dublin Whiskey Company, Alltech, Galway Bay Brewery, and 5 Lamps Brewery.

The Pearse Lyons distillery opened on St James's Street in September 2017. The Liberties is also home to the Dublin Liberties Distillery, a craft Irish whiskey distillery and visitor centre.

=== Retail ===
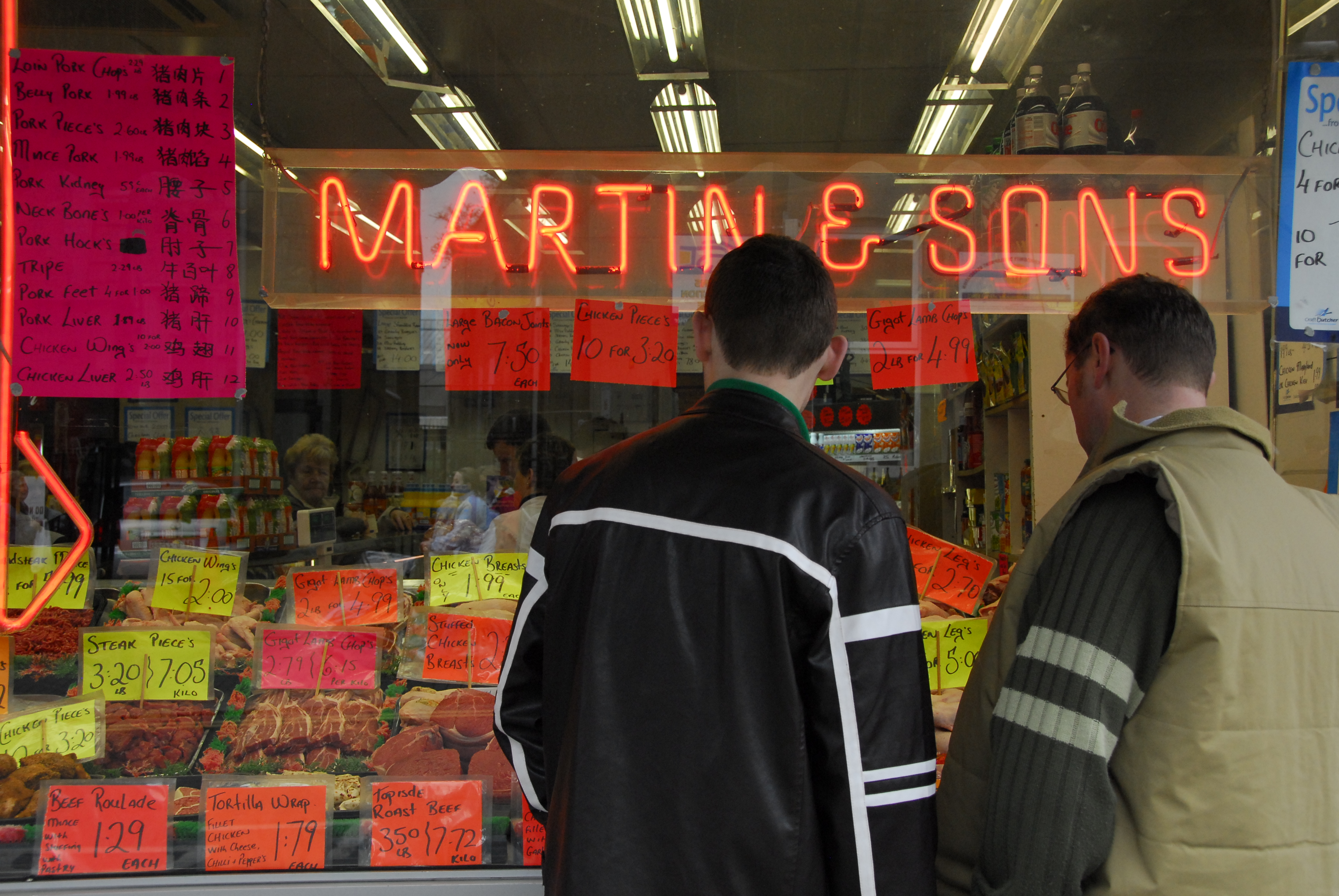
Butchers in The Liberties

Historically, The Liberties was home to some market areas. Today there are the Liberty Market on Meath Street, the fruit and vegetable markets during weekends on Thomas Street and Meath Street, and street vendors located throughout the area. There are future plans for further market areas, such as the redevelopment of the Iveagh Markets on Francis Street.

The Dublin Flea Market ran in Newmarket from 2008 with up to 80 stalls, but closed down in 2018 due to redevelopment of the area. It moved to a temporary home in Thomas Street before reestablishing in Newmarket in 2025, rebranded as Newmarket Flea.

=== The Digital Hub ===
The Digital Hub, a campus of digital content and technology enterprises, is located in the centre of The Liberties. Set up by the Government of Ireland in 2003, The Digital Hub was for a time Ireland's largest cluster of technology, internet and digital media companies. By 2021, it was home to approximately 30 companies employing 270 people.

=== Liberties Business Area Improvement Initiative ===
The Liberties Business Area Improvement Initiative is a scheme by Dublin City Council to upgrade the commercial areas of Dublin 8 through public and private sector investment, to create a more attractive neighbourhood.

=== Fumbally Exchange ===
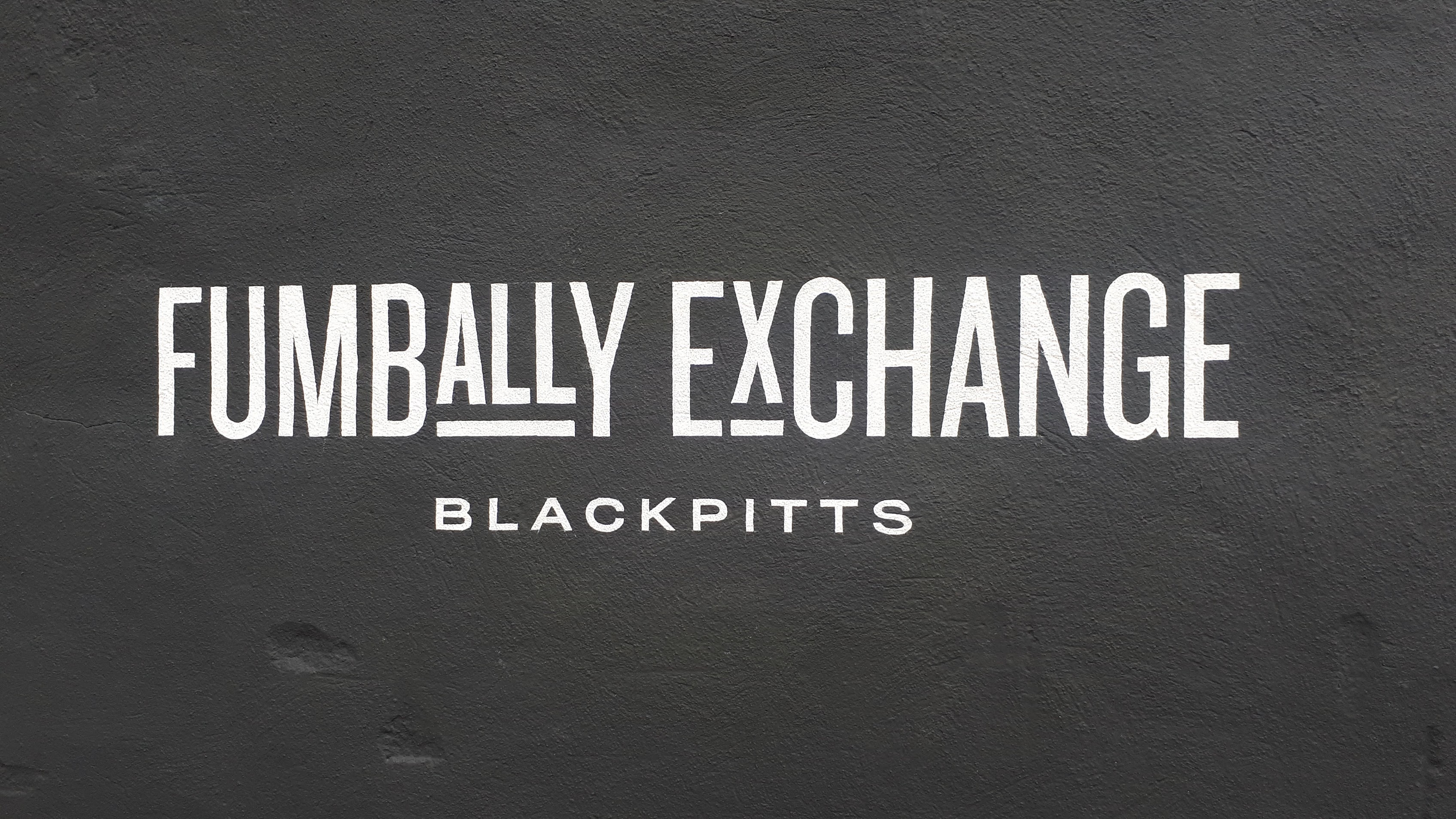
Painted sign for Fumbally Exchange, Blackpitts

Fumbally Exchange is a "community of artists, designers and business people" operating from shared office space on Blackpitts. It was established in 2010, on Fumbally Lane, as a response to the recession which impacted Ireland's architecture and design industry, including the closure of Murray Ó Laoire Architects in March 2010. Following a period operating from Dame Lane, the non-profit organisation moved to Blackpitts in 2018.

== Places of interest ==
The Liberties contains a number of landmarks and monuments, some dating to medieval times. One of the most notable of these is Christ Church Cathedral, the elder of the capital's two medieval cathedrals, the other being St Patrick's Cathedral.

=== Christ Church Cathedral ===
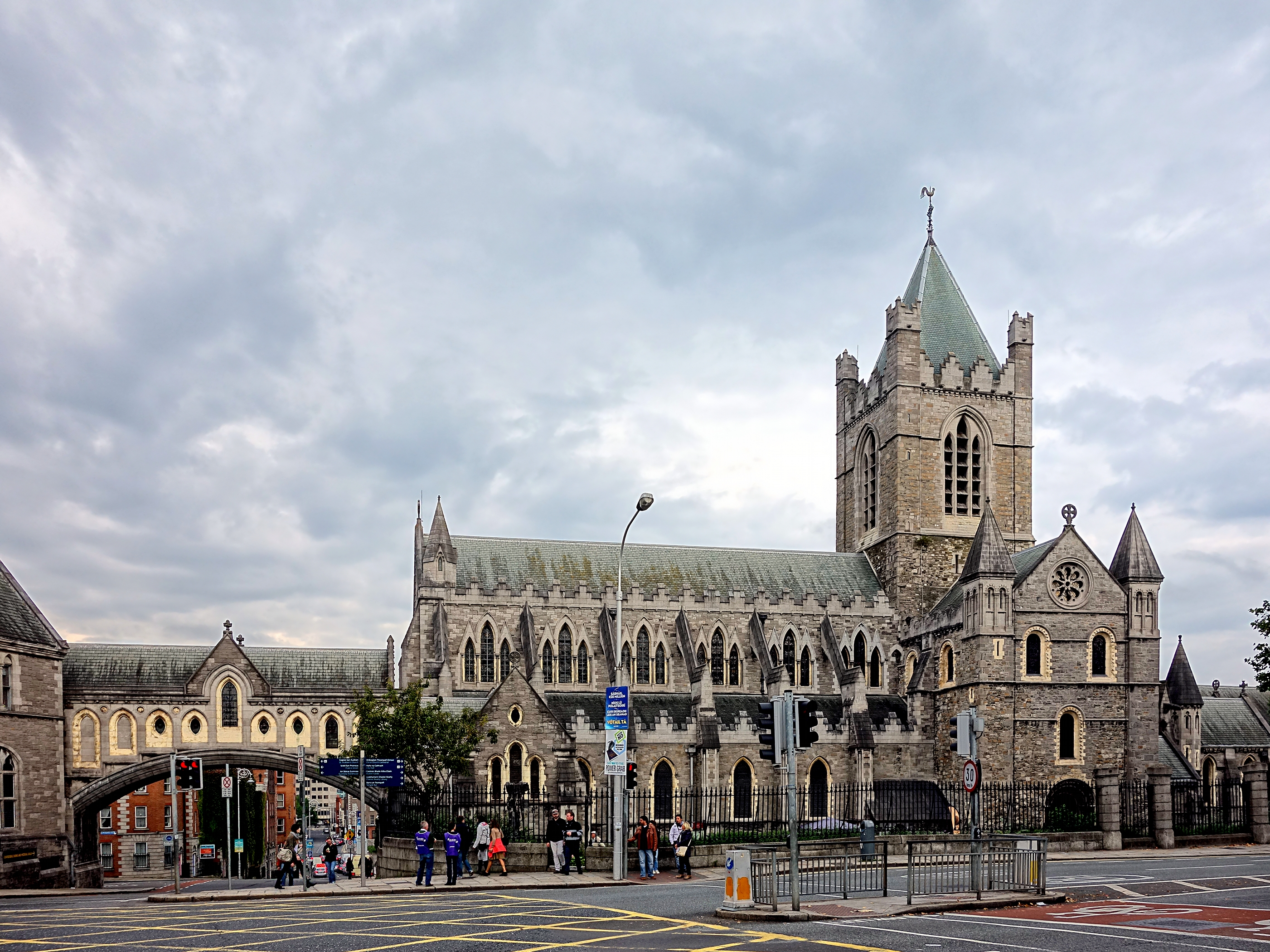
Christ Church Cathedral, Dublin

Christ Church is the seat (cathedral) of the Archbishop of Dublin in the Church of Ireland. Although it is also claimed by the Roman Catholic archbishops of Dublin, in practise it has been the cathedral of only the Church of Ireland's Archbishop of Dublin since the English Reformation. The cathedral was founded in c. 1030 before the Normans rebuilt it in stone after they arrived in Ireland in 1169.

=== Saint Patrick's Cathedral ===
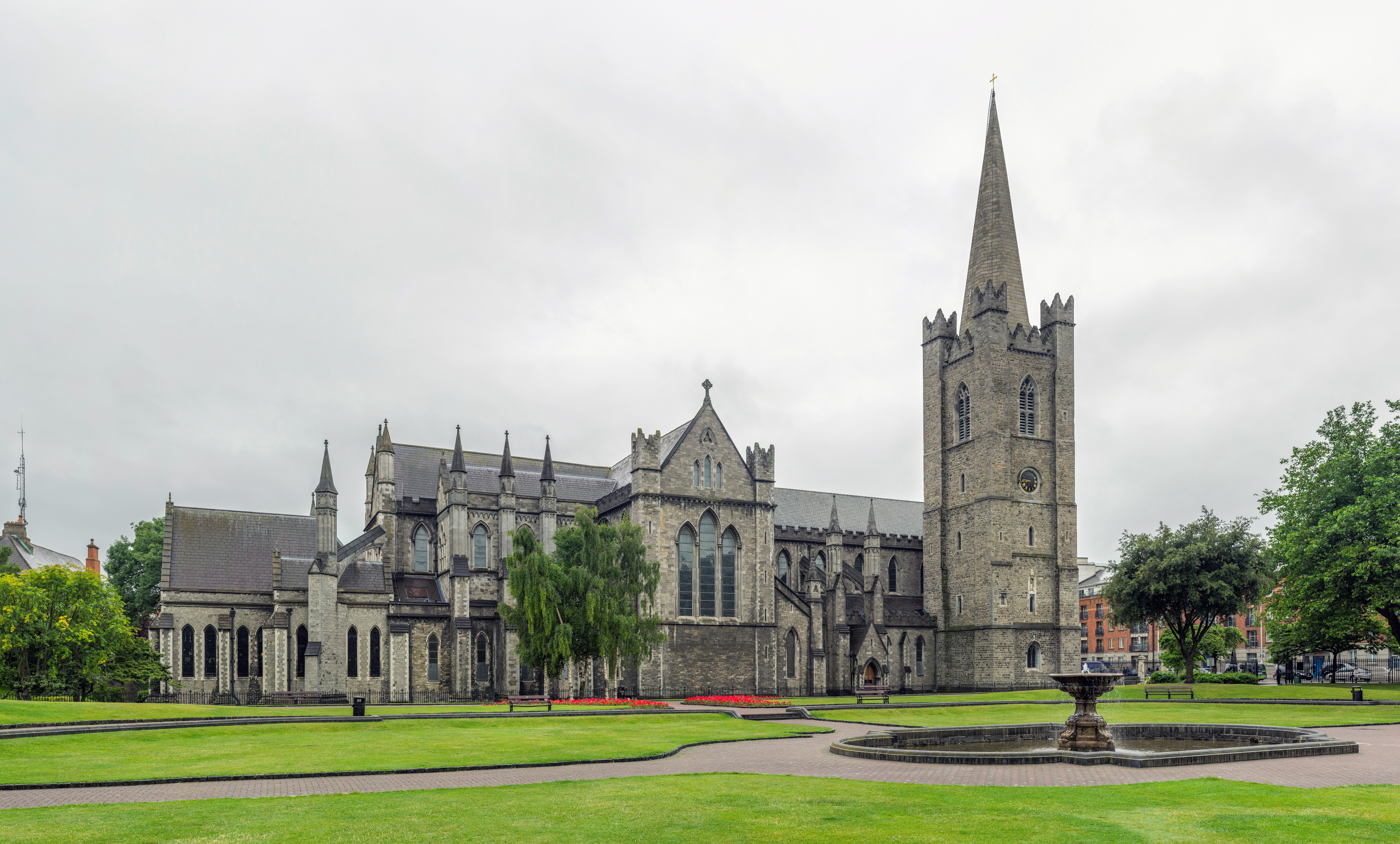
St Patrick's Cathedral, Dublin

Saint Patrick's Cathedral, founded in 1191, is the largest church in Ireland and Dublin's second Church of Ireland cathedral. Today Saint Patrick's is the location for a number of public national ceremonies, including Ireland's Remembrance Day, and graduation ceremonies for students of Dublin Institute of Technology, and is also a popular visitor attraction. Next to the cathedral is an urban park, St Patrick's Park, and nearby is the Cabbage Garden, a former cemetery linked to the cathedral, now also a public park.

=== Guinness Storehouse ===
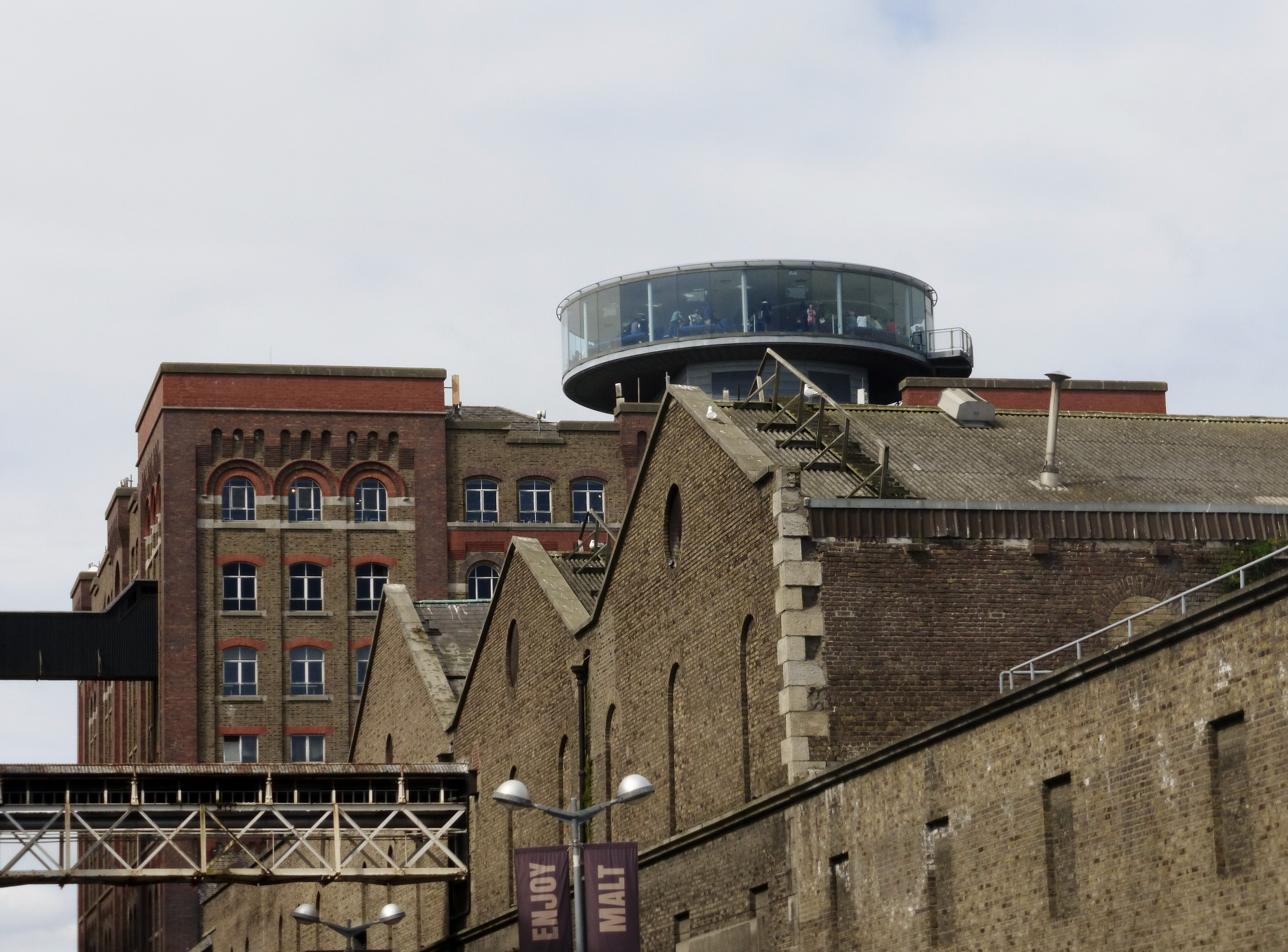
Guinness Storehouse

The Guinness Storehouse is Ireland's most-visited paid tourist destination, with 1.7 million annual visitors in 2018, and is located within the St. James's Gate Brewery site. It covers seven floors surrounding a glass atrium, shaped in the form of a pint of Guinness. The top floor houses the Gravity Bar, where visitors can view the Liberties and Dublin city.

=== John's Lane Church ===
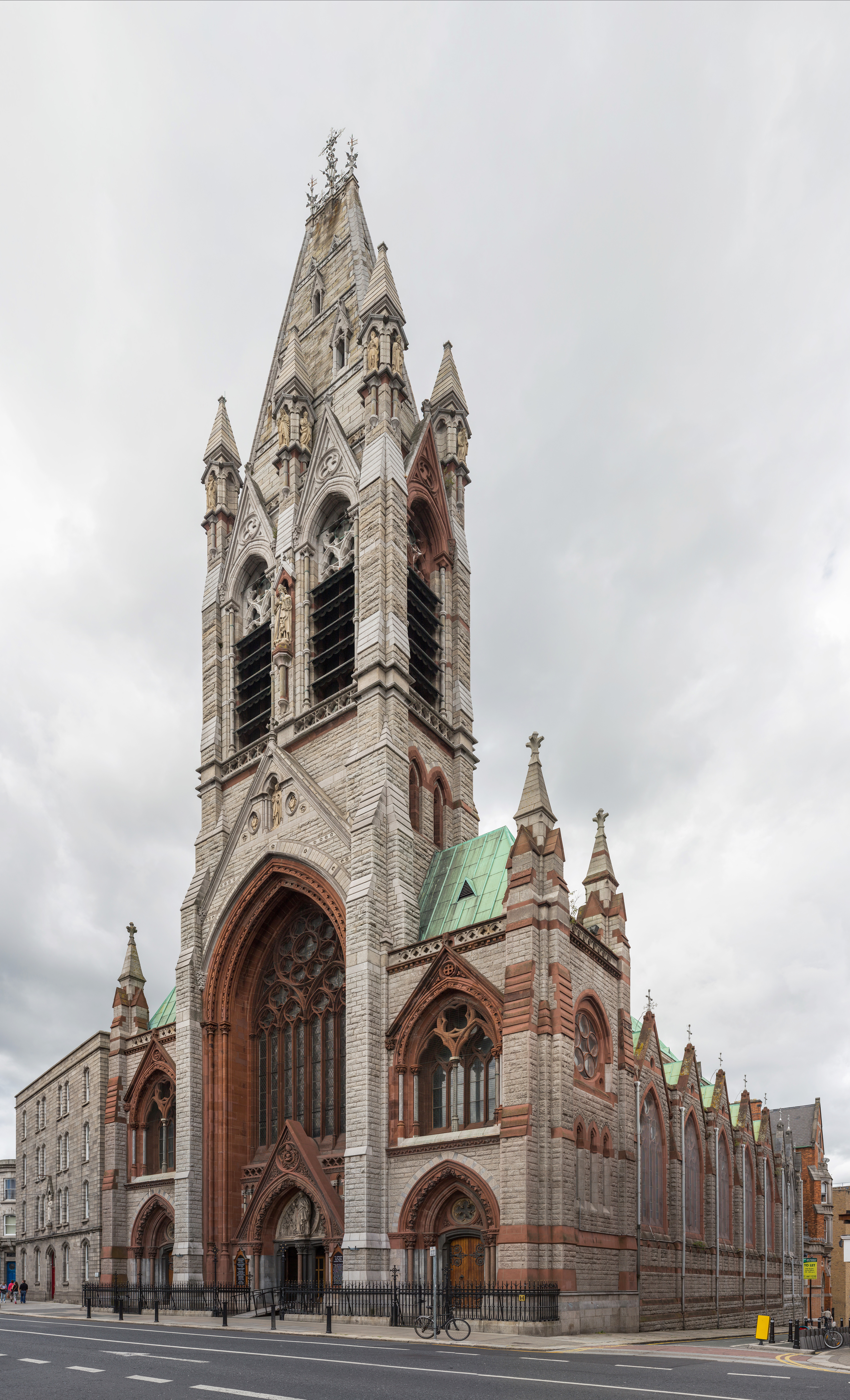
John's Lane Augustinian Church

John's Lane Augustinian Church, located on Thomas Street, was designed by Edward Welby Pugin and opened in 1874. The 12 statues in the tower niches are the work of sculptor James Pearse, the father of Patrick and William Pearse. The church steeple is the highest in the city, standing at over 200 feet (61.0 m).

=== Iveagh Markets ===
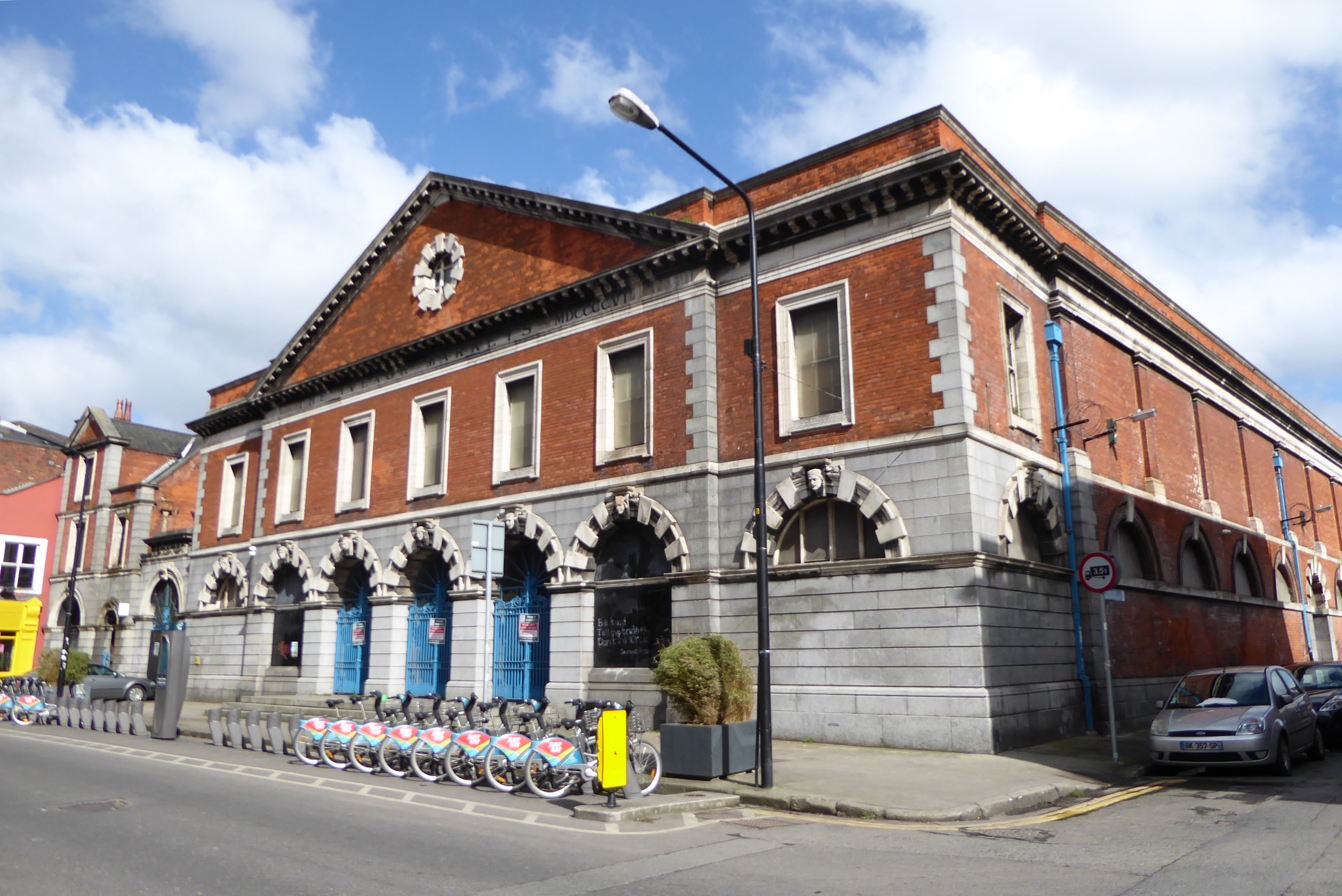
Iveagh Markets

Iveagh Markets is a Victorian-style market building on Francis Street. It has been part of a protracted ownership battle between Dublin City Council, hotelier Martin Keane, and the Guinness family, which has seen it lie vacant for over thirty years during which time it has fallen into a state of disrepair. In December 2025, it was reported that Dublin City Council had commenced essential repair works to the building.

=== Dubline ===
The Liberties is part of 'The Dubline Trail', a Fáilte Ireland tourist trail which runs from the top of O'Connell Street, south to College Green and then westwards through Dublin's city centre via the Liberties to Kilmainham.

== Transport ==
=== Road ===
There are a number of primary routes in The Liberties area. The Liffey's quays border The Liberties to the north, while Patrick Street provides the eastern boundary. Cork Street runs through the south of the area, while Thomas Street forms the main thoroughfare through the Liberties. Dublin Bus runs several services throughout the Liberties area.

=== Rail and tram ===
Heuston Station, one of Ireland's primary transport hubs, is located just to the north of the area. Lines serving Heuston are mainly regional routes. There are Luas, Dublin Bus, and DublinBikes services at the station.

A line on Dublin's Luas tram system, the Luas Red Line runs from Tallaght to The Point and from Saggart to Connolly. Stops on this line within the Liberties include Rialto, Fatima and James's.

=== Cycling ===
There are Dublinbikes terminals on High Street, Francis Street, John Street West, Oliver Bond Street, James Street, Market Street South and at St. James's Hospital. Several bicycle lanes are present and planned throughout the Liberties.

== Education ==
The National College of Art and Design (NCAD) is based on Thomas Street. In 2006, a suggestion that it be moved to UCD provoked controversy with locals and students and was rejected via a resolution. In September 2008, after a number of years of restorative work, the old Thomas Street Fire Station adjacent to the college was unveiled as a new wing of the existing campus.

Other institutions in the area include the British and Irish Modern Music Institute (Francis Street) and Liberties College.

Among its primary (national) schools are: St. Audoens National School, Canal Way Educate Together National School, Dublin Waldorf School, St. Brigid's Catholic Primary School, Francis Street School, St. Catherine's National School, and St. James's Primary School. Secondary schools in the area include CBS James Street and Presentation Secondary School Warrenmount.

== Notable residents ==
- The first Baron Ardee, Sir Edward was a Privy Councillor to Queen Elizabeth I and lived in Dublin, probably in Cork St.
- W. T. Cosgrave, first president of the Executive Council of the Irish Free State, was born on James's Street.
- Academy Award winner Brenda Fricker resided in Pimlico.
- Comedian Brendan Grace was born in The Liberties
- Actor Jeremy Irons and his wife Sinéad Cusack own a home on John Dillon Street near the Iveagh Market.
- Revolutionary and trade union activist Lily Kempson. She was the last survivor of the Easter Rising
- Cabaret Singer Sonny Knowles was born in The Liberties
- Michael Mallin, executed for his part in the Easter Rising
- Singer Imelda May is from the Liberties area.
- P. J. McCall author of lyrics for "Follow me up to Carlow", "The Boys of Wexford", "Boolavogue and "Kelly the Boy from Killanne" was born and lived all his life in 25 Patrick St. (which was a public house).
- Mark Sheehan of The Script was originally from the James's Street area.
- Irish rock band Fontaines D.C. were formed at BIMM Dublin, a university in the area.
