= Lady of the Rock =

Religious community in the Mojave, California, United States

Lady of the Rock (also known as: Our Lady of the Rock, Virgin of the Rock, or Virgin Mary of the Rock) is a religious community that gathers on the 13th of every month in the high desert of Mojave, California, United States.

== History ==
In 1989, a Catholic woman Maria Paula Acuna went to a Los Angeles canyon to pray for the health of one of her children. She claimed that she was interrupted by a light that appeared to be the Virgin Mary (also known as Our Lady of Guadalupe). The apparition then gave Maria Paula instructions to lead her people to a location where the Virgin Mary would make herself known to the audience. Since that day the Virgin Mary has been said to deliver various messages to Maria Paula and her audience.

== Ceremony ==
At each gathering various masses and pilgrimages occur during the day. Typically, ceremonies run from 10:00am-5:00pm (PST).

== Location ==
The site is 120 miles from Los Angeles and 230 miles from Las Vegas. Many tourists have trouble finding it as the route does not have many signs, landmarks or obvious signs of activities aside from the presence of campers.

The site is surrounded by a fence. Facilities include a hut, bathrooms and a water fountain. Vehicles are parked in the desert nearby. Vendors operate just outside the venue.

== Popularity ==
The gatherings attract thousands of visitors. Received messages are translated into Spanish for the audience. Many travel from Mexico to witness the event.

== Miracles ==
Many tourists report unexplained experiences, such as the smell of roses in their vehicles, rapid weather changes around the area, medical cures and peaceful vibes.

The most common experience reported is a unique glare of the sun. Frequently, visitors take videos and pictures of the sky and many have supposedly captured a glare in the form of a cross, a rainbow around the sun, clouds surrounding the sun, or separated light next to the sun.

Another reported occurrence is that many visitors who attempt to take a photo of the statue of the Virgin Mary outside of the hut find that their image is obscured with a white light covering the statue.

== See also ==
- Lady on the Rock, a popular plaster statue that is visible in the windows of many residential homes in Dublin, Ireland.
