= St. Luke's Church, Dublin =

Former protestant church in Dublin, Ireland

Coordinates: 53°20′18.75″N 6°16′31.88″W

St. Luke's Church
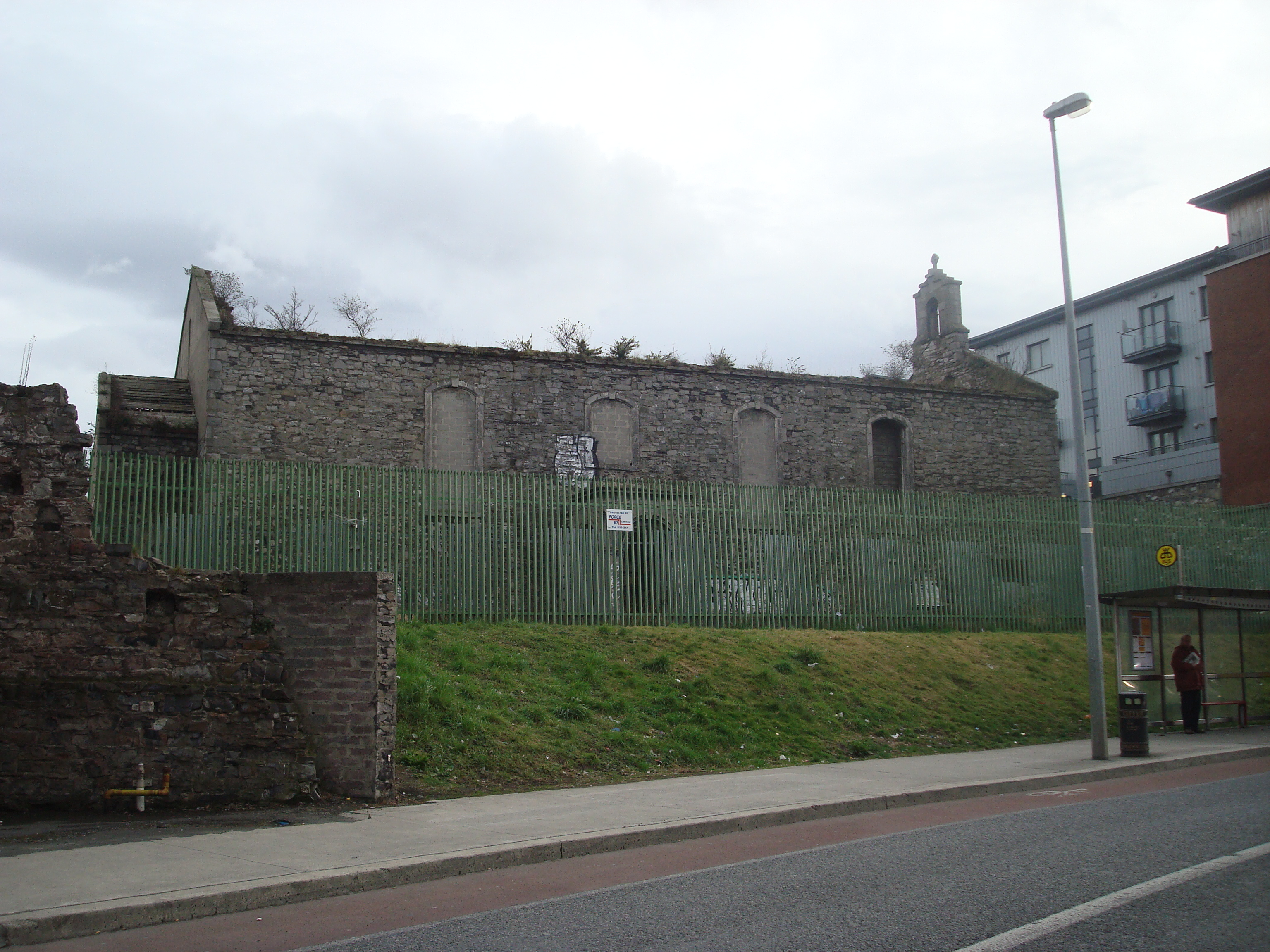
- St. Luke's Church
- Location: The Coombe, Dublin
- Country: Ireland
- Denomination: Church of Ireland

History
- Dedication: St. Luke
- Consecrated: 8 October 1716

Architecture
- Heritage designation: Protected Structure
- Architect: Thomas Burgh
- Completed: 1709
- Closed: 1975

Specifications
- Materials: Calp Limestone

Administration
- Parish: Parish of St. Luke

St. Luke's Church is a former Church of Ireland parish church in Dublin, Ireland. It is located on The Coombe, not far from St. Patrick's Cathedral.

== The building ==
=== History as a church ===
In 1708, an act of parliament was passed, dividing the parish of St. Nicholas Without and giving part of it the denomination of St. Luke's. A glebe house was erected on The Coombe for the vicar, who was nominated by the Chapter of St. Patrick's Cathedral, and the church of St. Luke erected not far from the Glebe, by Thomas Burgh, Surveyor General.

The church was consecrated on 7 October 1716. Other craftsmen recorded as working on the building include Francis Quin as bricklayer, William Caldbeck and John Whinnery as stonemasons and Isaac Wills as a carpenter.

Much of the interior survived until its destruction in 1986 including the original barley twist banisters which are typical of the period and survive in nearby buildings of the same period.

It has been said that the church was built mainly for the benefit of the conformist French Huguenot weavers who lived in the neighbourhood. However, very few, if any, French names appeared in the parish registers from this time - the Huguenots had their own place of worship in a chapel in nearby St. Patrick's Cathedral. However, there was a huge influx of weavers and others associated with the silk and poplin industries and cotton and wool manufacture.

Early maps show the church was accessed by a tree lined avenue from the Coombe.

=== Later history ===
The church was closed in 1975. It was burned by an arsonist in 1986. It is in the ownership of Dublin City Council and is a protected structure.

The church was reopened in 2017 after a complete restoration, in which a new two floor office facility was installed within the church walls.

The grounds were converted into public space, and the graves were moved by Dublin City Council.

== The cemetery ==
Behind the church was a small cemetery. Among those interred there was Mr. Justice Hellen, second Judge of the Court of Common Pleas in Ireland, who died in 1793. Also buried here were the family of famous publisher Alexander Thom. The relief road leading to Cork St., built 1980-2000, cut through the old cemetery.

== The parish ==
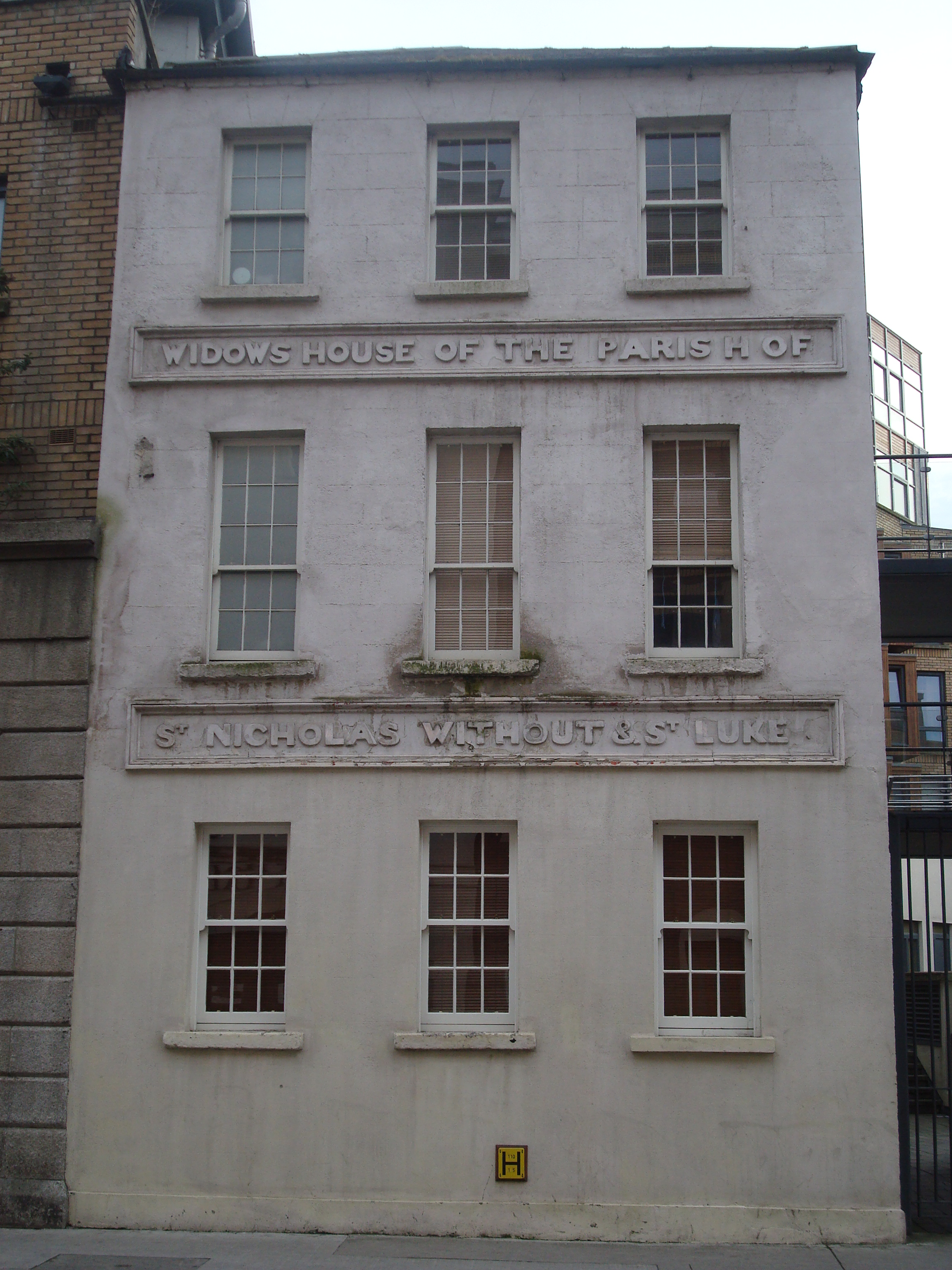
Widows House of the parish of St. Nicholas Without and St. Luke

The parish lay at the southern end of the Liberty of Thomas Court and Donore, which in turn was located to the west of the medieval city of Dublin. The northern boundary was the Coombe.

Most of the parish population in the late 17th and 18th centuries were weavers in the Dublin Liberties. Wool manufacturing more or less died out after the Wool Act 1699, which prevented the export of Irish wool, but silk, cotton and poplin industries continued to employ large numbers and generate wealth until the end of the 18th century.

In 1766, in order to check the growth of Catholics, the British government ordered a religious census to be carried out by the Protestant clergy, which showed the parish had 4,953 Catholics and 2,908 Protestants. The Catholics did not have a parish church of their own in this parish, but belonged to the Catholic St. Nicholas parish, but they did, from 1729, have six schools here, all run by women.

After the collapse of the weaving trade and the economic slump after the Act of Union, most of the parishioners were left destitute. So proverbial was this parish for its poverty, that in the 19th century the advertisement of the annual charity sermon for St. Luke's was headed by the words, "The Poorest Parish in Dublin." Among the more notable philanthropic donations was from Thomas Pleasants who built the Stove Tenter House on nearby Cork Street from 1814-1815 so that weavers could dry their cloth in inclement weather.

A school was established for poor boys of the parish in 1810. When the school was moved to New Street in 1862, the building was converted to form the Widows Alms House, which is still standing.

== See also ==
- Weavers' Hall, Dublin

== References and sources ==
Notes

Sources

- Gilbert, John (1854). A History of the City of Dublin. Oxford: Oxford University.
- George Newenham Wright An Historical Guide to the City of Dublin
- Craig, Maurice (1969). Dublin: 1660-1860. Dublin: Allen Figgis.
