= Abbey of St Thomas the Martyr =

Ruined Augustinian monastery in Dublin, Ireland

- Mainistir Thomáis Mairtíreach
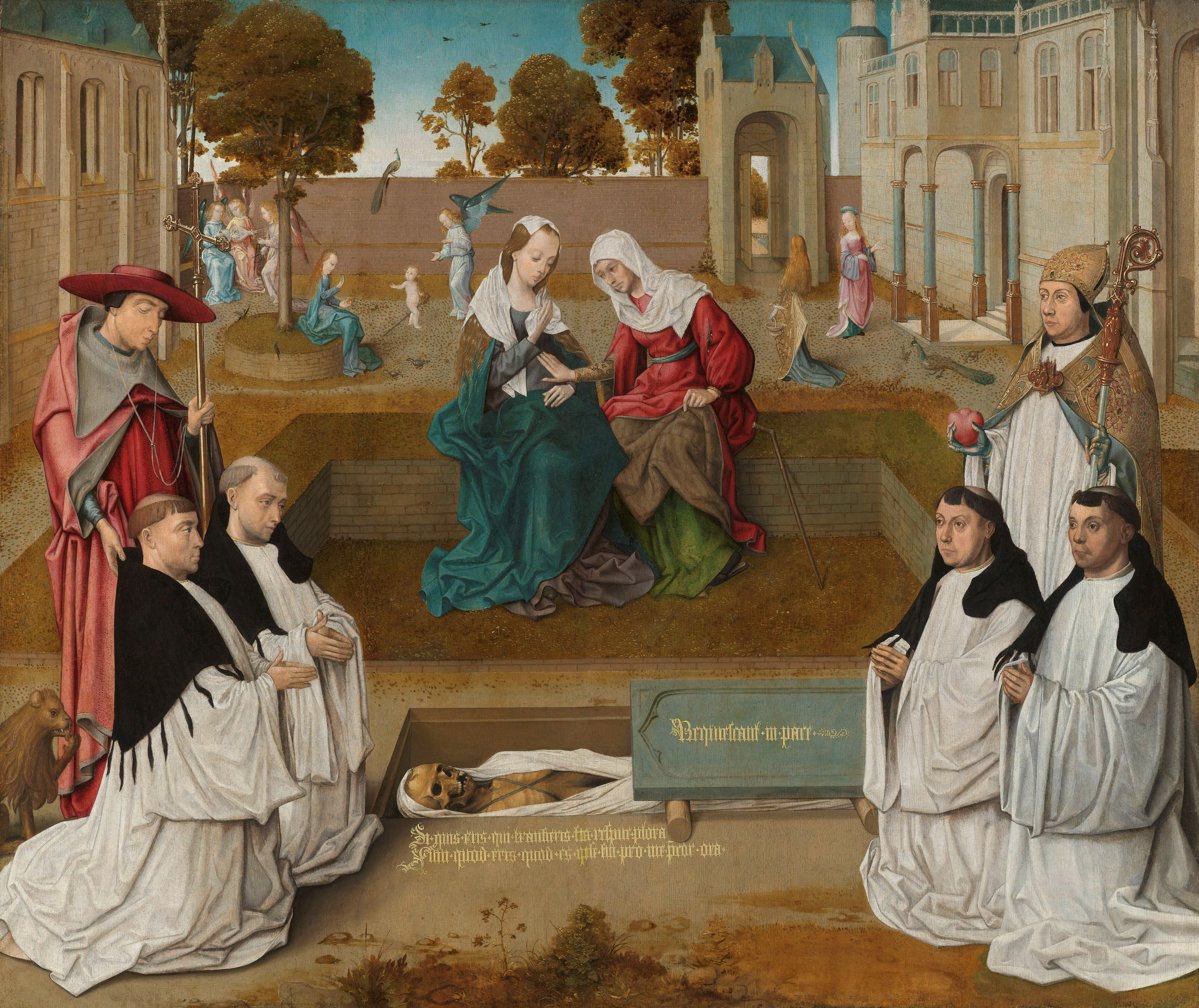
- Four canons with Sts. Augustine and Jerome about an open grave with the Visitation of Mary in the rear by the Master of the Spes (fl. 1490-1520, Spanish Netherlands)

- Location within Central Dublin Location within Dublin

Monastery information
- Full name: Abbey of St Thomas the Martyr
- Other name: Thomas Court
- Order: Augustinian Canons Regular; Victorines
- Denomination: Pre-Reformation Catholic
- Established: 1177
- Disestablished: 1539
- Dedication: Thomas Becket
- Archdiocese: Dublin

People
- Founder: William FitzAldelm

Architecture
- Style: Norman

Site
- Location: South Earl Street, Dublin
- Country: Ireland
- Coordinates: 53°20′29″N 6°16′49″W
- Visible remains: Walls, some floor surfaces in stone and tile, fragments of window tracery

The Abbey of St Thomas the Martyr was a 12th-century Augustinian monastery located to the southwest of Dublin, Ireland, dedicated to Thomas Becket.

== Location ==
The abbey was to the southwest of Dublin, outside the city walls. The cloister was located where modern Pimlico is, while the church was near to South Earl Street.

== History ==
The priory was founded in 1177 by William FitzAldelm on orders of Henry II, King of England, and named in honour of Thomas Becket, assassinated by Henry's knights in 1170.

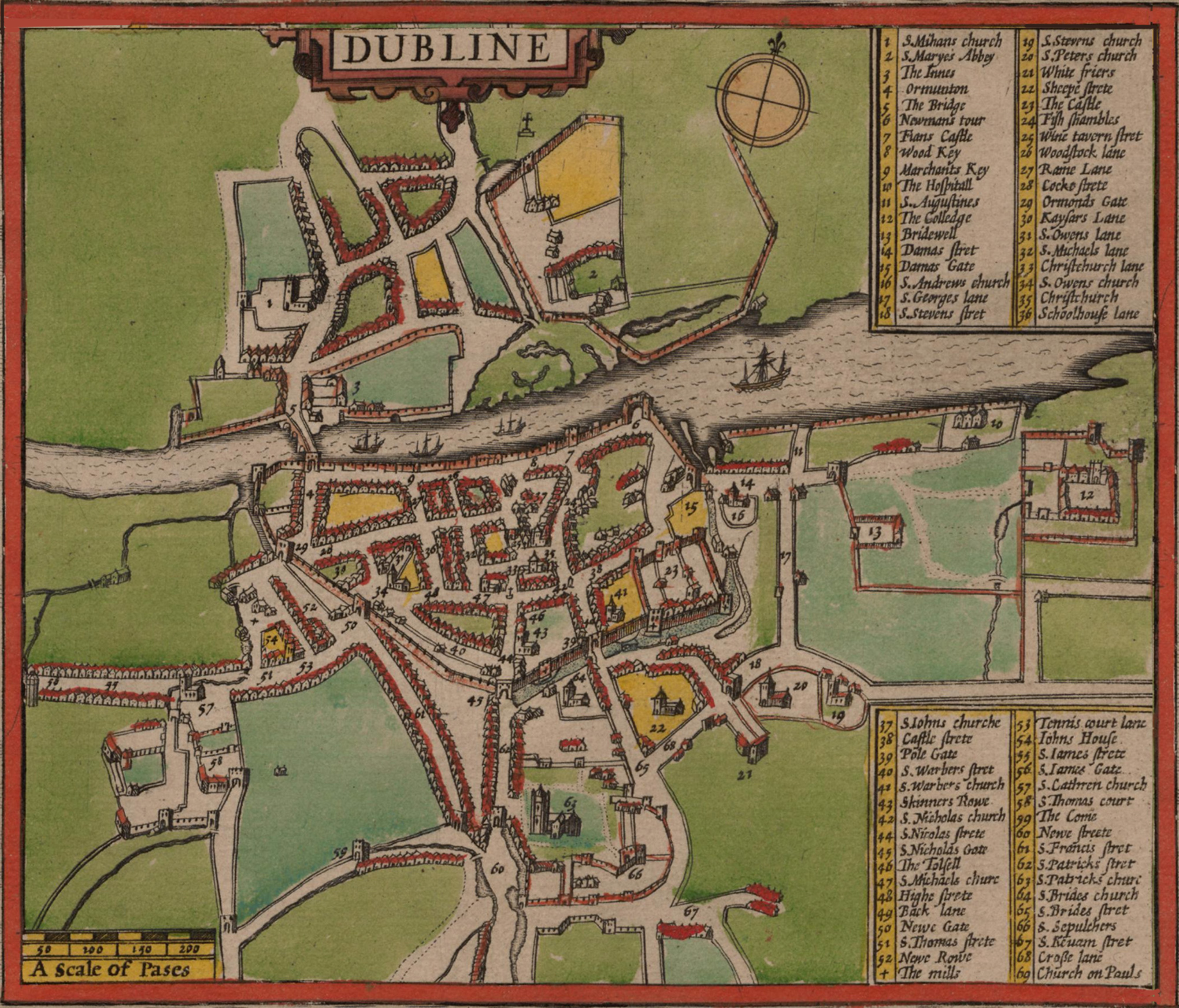
John Speed's Map of Dublin (1610); Thomas Court is at the bottom left, in the red circle.

The Abbey of St. Thomas the Martyr was inhabited by a community of Augustinian Canons Regular who followed the Rule of Life of the canons of the Abbey of St. Victor in Paris. The first canons may have come over from the Abbey of St. Augustine in Bristol. Some sources say it was initially belonged to the Knights of Saint Thomas before passing over to the Augustinian canons.

Henry's son John, Lord of Ireland and later King of England, was a benefactor of the abbey, granting it a tolboll (right to tax on all ale produced in Dublin).

The abbey became very wealthy, due to its extensive lands in Meath and Kildare and its control of the southwest roads into Dublin. It was responsible for maintaining the City Watercourse, a diversion of water from the River Dodder to the River Poddle. The Liberty of Thomas Court and Donore, one of the Liberties of Dublin, was founded in the late 12th century.

Notable events in its lifetime:

- 1195: The head of Hugh de Lacy, Lord of Meath, killed in 1187 by the O'Rourkes, is sent for burial at the Abbey of St. Thomas. His body was buried in Bective Abbey, County Meath. A long dispute was carried on between the two abbeys for his body, which was finally settled in favour of St. Thomas in 1205.
- 1201: Basilia de Clare (sister of Strongbow) is buried in St Thomas'
- c. 1244: Water is diverted from the River Dodder to power four mills.
- 1250: stone for the church of St Thomas' Abbey was seized by the mayor and bailiffs of Bristol to repair a castle, and is returned by order of the King
- 1289: several buildings destroyed by accidental fire
- 1306: Abbot Richard Sweteman is accused of assaulting John the Baker on the highway of Dublin.
- 1380: Gaelic Irish are forbidden to become becoming canons of the community.
- 1392: the Abbey is attacked by a mob, windows are broken along with fire damage and the dormitory is destroyed

In 1538 Henry VIII dissolved the monasteries of England, Wales and Ireland. At this time the Abbey of St. Thomas Court held 56 rectories, 2,197 acres (9 km^{2}) of land, 67 houses, 47 messuages and 19 gardens. Most of the land was in Counties Meath and Kildare. These possessions were distributed among several people, of which Sir William Brabazon (an ancestor of the Earls of Meath) and Richard St. Leger were the major beneficiaries. On 31 March 1545 Sir William Brabazon was granted the lands of the abbey, with all jurisdictions, liberties, privileges, and so on. This grant was confirmed in 1609 to Edward Brabazon, 1st Baron Ardee, his son.

== Today ==
The abbey's name was given to nearby Thomas Street. An excavation of 1996–1997 exposed the south wall of the church, which extends east-west across the entire length of the site. The wall is over 2.75 m (9 ft 0 in) wide. A north-south wall was judged to mark the nave and chancel of the abbey church. Cobbled floor and tiled pavements were also found, as well as fragments of Dundry stone from a window. The abbey's remains are preserved under local allotments. A 2017 excavation on Thomas Street found a limestone double column base from the Abbey, and also a chamfered hood moulding of Dundry stone believed to be from the Abbey.

== See also ==
- List of monastic houses in County Dublin
