= William FitzAldelm =

Anglo-Norman nobleman

William FitzAldelm, FitzAdelm, FitzAldhelm, or FitzAudelin was an Anglo-Norman nobleman from Suffolk or North Yorkshire. He was the son of Adelm de Burgate, and an important courtier who took part in the Anglo-Norman invasion of Ireland.

== Courtier ==
In 1165 William FitzAdeline's father Adelm d'Aldfied and his brother Ralph FitzAdeline gave lands at Fountains to the Abbey, which gift was confirmed by Roger de Mowbray. Ralph FitzAdeline held one fee in Yorkshire from Mowbray in 1165, and witnessed a charter by his brother to the Knights Hospitallers.

The manor of Ongar alias Little Ongar, later known as Ashhall alias Nash Hall was held as a marshalship. This marshalship consisted of looking after the prostitutes at the king's court, dismembering condemned malefactors, and measuring the king's 'gallons' and 'bushels'. In 1156 this strange office had been held by William Fitz Audelin, who had received it in marriage with Juliane Doisnel, daughter of Robert Doisnel. The manor of Sherfield Upon Loddon was held by the English Crown till the reign of Henry II, by whom it was granted, before 1167–8, to his marshal William Fitz Aldelin on his marriage with Juliane. William held the manor by the serjeanty of being the king's marshal. The manor of Compton was given by the King from his marriage to Juliane.

== Ireland ==
It is evident from the latter charter that he accompanied King Henry II in his expedition to Ireland in October 1171. He was sent with Hugh de Lacy to receive the allegiance of Rory, King of Connaught, and on the King's return to England in the next year the city of Wexford was committed to his charge, with two lieutenants under him. In 1173 Pope Adrian's bull granting the kingdom of Ireland to Henry, Laudabiliter, was entrusted to the prior of Wallingford and him to exhibit before the synod of bishops at Waterford. On the death of Strongbow, Lord of Leinster, in 1176, the king appointed him deputy over the whole of that kingdom and granted him the wardship of Isabel, the earl's daughter and heir.

His government, which is represented as having been weak and negligent, did not last above a year, Prince John receiving a grant of the Lordship of Ireland at the parliament held at Oxford in May 1177, Fitz-Aldelm himself being present there. The city of Wexford, however, was restored to his charge, together with the province of Leinster.

Once again in 1181 the government of Ireland was again entrusted to him. During his residence in Ireland, he founded the priory of Saint Thomas the Martyr at Dublin; and in Henry's charter of confirmation he is called the king's "dapifer" (steward). He was also Seneschal of Normandy, Ponthieu, and some other of the king's dominions in France. In 1185 the manor of Maplederwell was held by William Fitz Audelin as a gift from the King. After the Henry's death he held the office of sheriff of Cumberland, during the first nine years of Richard's reign, in the first year of which he was amerced in sum of 60L. (£60) for not coming into the Exchequer to account for twelve days after he was summonsed. In the same year he was one of the justices itinerant in that county and in Yorkshire; and in the former again in 1197 (8th year of Richard I). FitzAldelm died in 1205.

He is sometimes confused, genealogically, with William de Burgh, but this has long been known to be an error.
