= Deanery of St Patrick =

Former historical area of Dublin

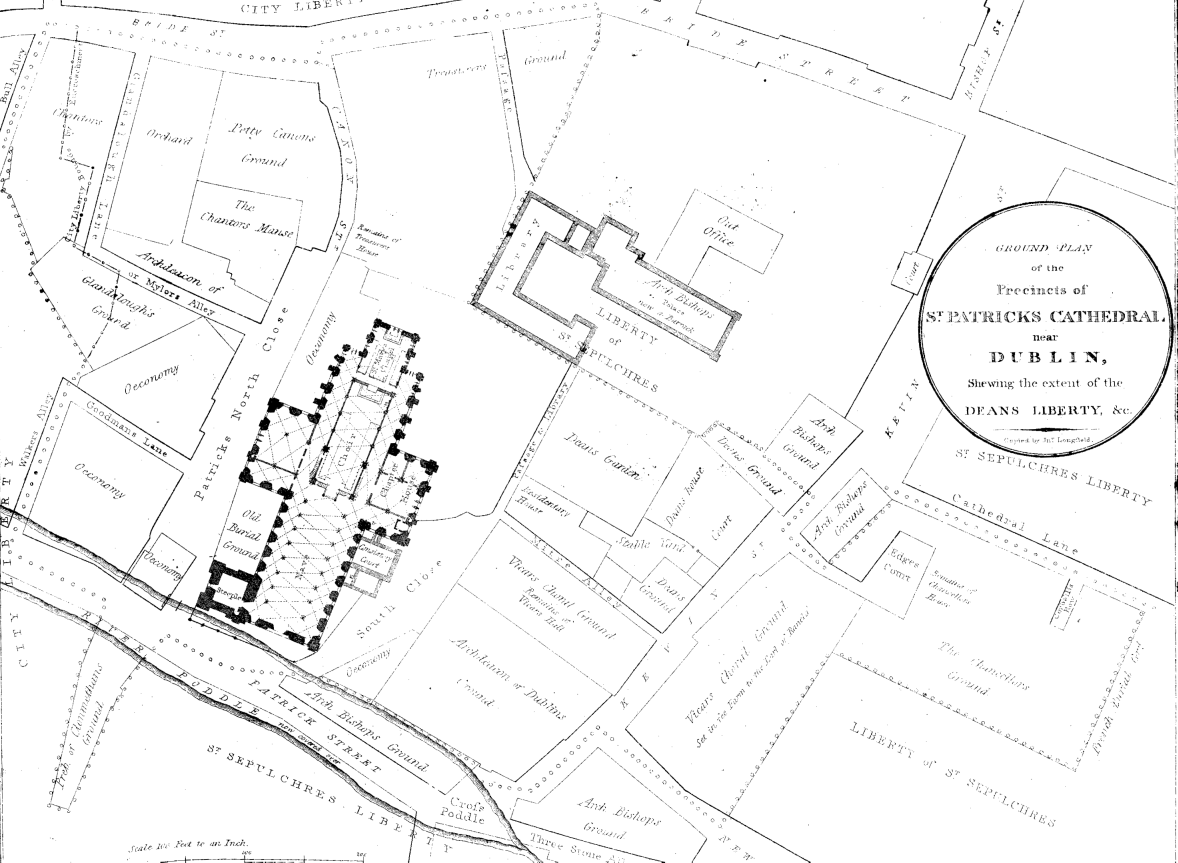
A 19th-century plan of the precincts of St. Patrick's Cathedral, showing the boundary of the dean's liberty. North is left.

The Deanery of St Patrick was one of several manors, or liberties, that existed in Dublin, Ireland from the time of the Anglo-Normans in the 12th century. They were lands united to the city, but still preserving their own jurisdiction. The Lord of the manor was the Dean of St Patrick's Cathedral, Dublin. In the 19th century it was the smallest of the liberties of Dublin.

== History ==
When the first Anglo-Norman archbishop of Dublin, John Comyn, established the church that became St. Patrick's Cathedral, he bestowed upon the church a plot of ground surrounding it to the extent of about five and a half acres, which formed the liberty of the Dean of St. Patrick's. His jurisdiction was recognized many times in Acts of Parliament and Letters Patent, and was considerable in its powers. Not only did the privilege of sanctuary prevail here, but the goods as well as the persons of law-breakers were secure within the Dean's Liberty, which was independent of the Archbishop as well as of the Sheriff of the county.

By 1800 the manor was inhabited by some of the poorest people in the city, and the court of the manor has been discontinued. The only advantage its poor inhabitants possessed was that they were exempt from the jurisdiction of other courts, so they could elude the clutches of the bailiff by flying for refuge to the confines of their own manor.

== Location ==
The manor consisted of only a few streets in the neighbourhood of St. Patrick's Cathedral. It was surrounded by the manors of St. Sepulchre and Thomas Court. The area covered today by St. Patrick's Park was part of the liberty, and in former times had been reserved for the use of various Cathedral officials. But from the beginning of the 19th century it was occupied by miserable tenement houses, and was reckoned one of the poorest districts in the city of Dublin.

== Privileges ==
In return for the support of the Lord of the manor, or to alleviate certain hardships suffered by Englishmen or the church in Ireland, privileges were granted to the manor. These allowed the manor to have its own courts of justice, where they were allowed to try a limited number of crimes, mainly dealing with bad debts.

These rights and privileges ended in 1840.

== Administration ==
The officers of the manor consisted of a seneschal, registrar and marshal, who were appointed by the Dean and Chapter of St. Patrick's.

In 1813 the population of this manor was 981 males and 1,265 females. It was 886 in 1901 and 42 in 1981.
