= Lady on the Rock (statue) =

Plaster statuette, popular in Dublin

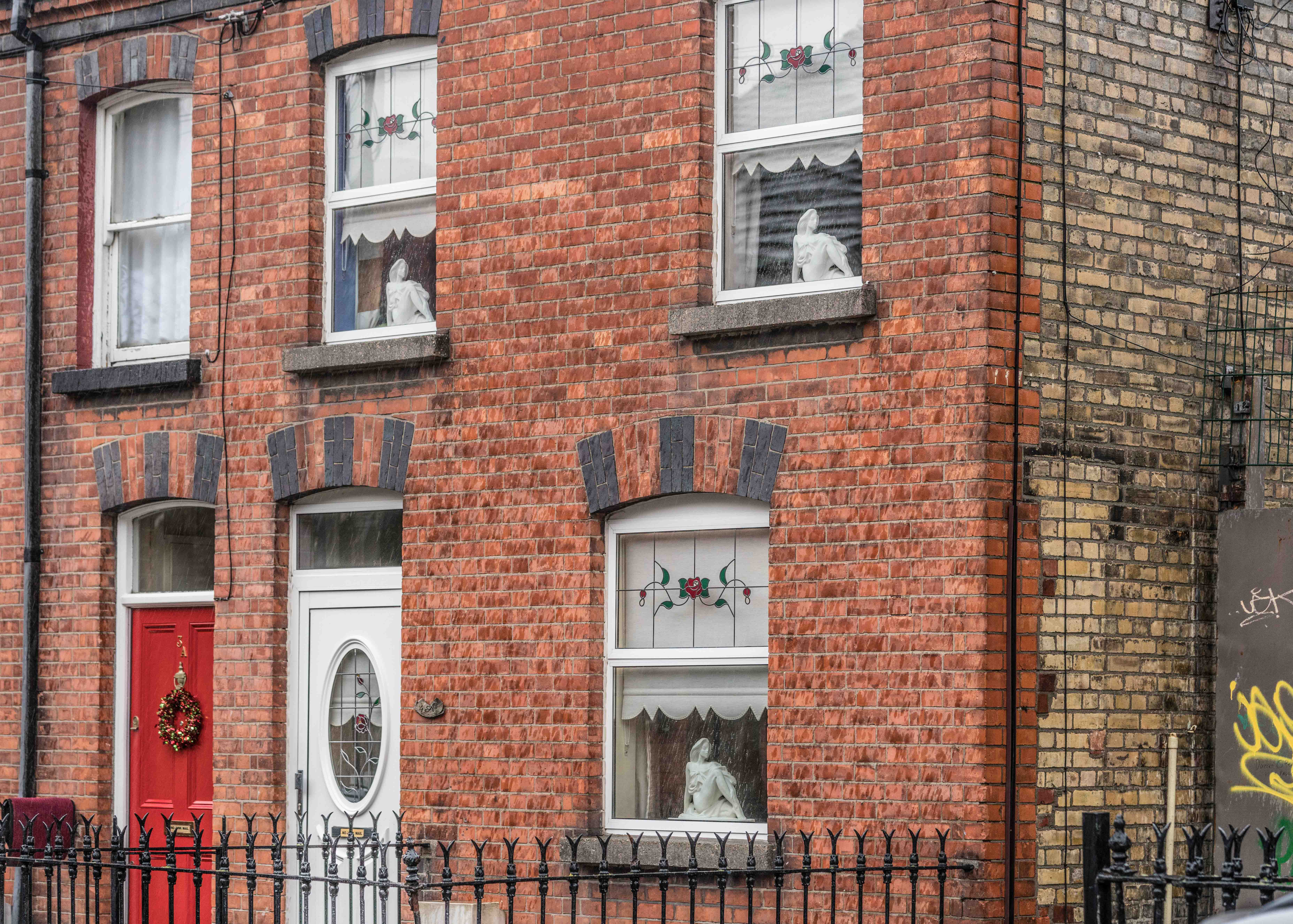
Lady on the Rock statues in Dublin (2015)

The Lady On The Rock, also known as the White Lady, is a popular plaster statue that is seen in the windows of many residential homes in Dublin city. Its popularity has led to many theories about the meaning and significance of the statue.

== Origin ==
The statue features a reclining woman draped in fabric. Originally made as a clay model by artist Harold Gardiner around 1993, it was then cast in fibreglass by Edward Loughman of RPM Supplies. Gardiner had the mould made so as to gift the statue to friends and family. When Gardiner died in 1995 Loughman cleared out Gardiner's workshop at his widow's request and took the cast of the Lady. Loughman subsequently sold the cast to Vincent Doran of Dublin Mouldings. Since then the statue has been produced and sold by Dublin Mouldings, a shop and workshop on Parnell Street.

== Theories of the meaning ==
The popularity of the statue has led to many theories emerging about the significance of the Lady. She is most prevalent on the north side of the city, and in areas such as the Liberties. A residence will often have numerous statues, one in each window. Some have suggested that the presence of the statue in a window marks a brothel, that drugs are available for sale, or that protection money has been paid by the resident. Others have suggested that she represents Molly Malone. There is also speculation that she could represent the Virgin Mary or Mary Magdalene.

== In popular culture ==
- Californian artist Jessie Ward O'Sullivan won the 2010 Darklight Festival's 'Free Your Film' contest for her short film about the lady, entitled Lady On The Rock.
- The White Lady art gallery is named after her, and sells versions of the lady painted in different ways.
- In 2015, a group of secondary school students investigated and created their own versions of the white lady, which were subsequently exhibited in the axis:Ballymun.
- The statue has also been made into a Christmas decoration, as well as an enamel pin.
