= Cork Street, Dublin =

Street in Dublin, Ireland

Cork Street
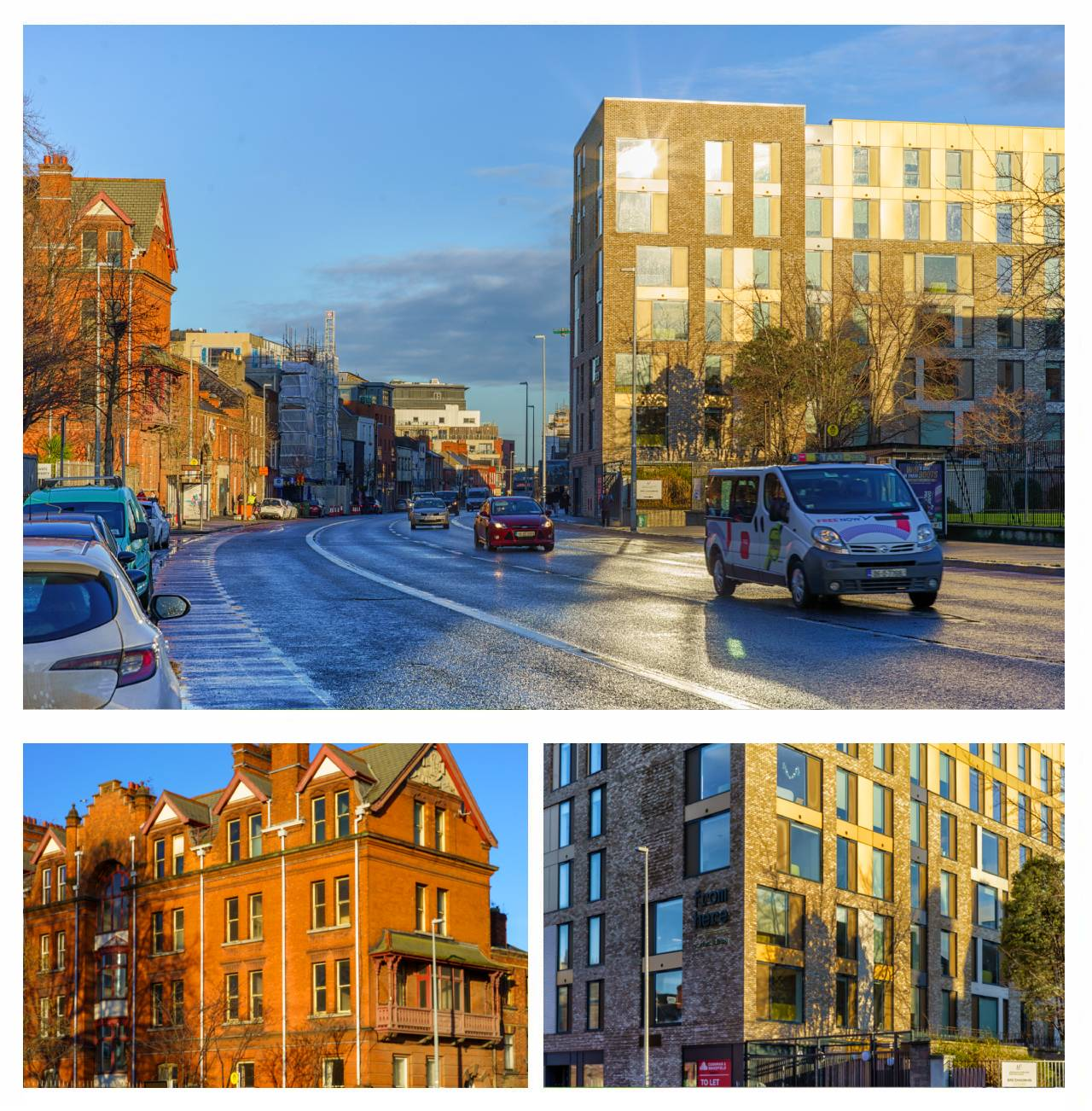
- Clockwise from top: Cork Street looking northeast; student accommodation on Cork Street; the James Weir Home for Nurses

- Location within Central Dublin
- Native name: Sráid Chorcaí (Irish)
- Namesake: Richard Boyle, 1st Earl of Cork
- Length: 800 m (2,600 ft)
- Width: 24 metres (79 ft)
- Location: Dublin, Ireland
- Postal code: D08
- Coordinates: 53°20′18.15″N 6°16′50.48″W
- west end: Dolphin's Barn Street, Emerald Square
- east end: St. Luke's Avenue, Ardee Street

Cork Street (Irish: Sráid Chorcaí) runs from the junction of The Coombe to Donore Avenue.

== History ==
It was named after the first Earl of Cork and once formed part of the ancient highway "An Slighe Dála" connecting Dublin with the west of Ireland. On old maps it was described as "The Highway to Dolfynesberne" (Dolphin's Barn).

The street was once a centre of fine wool and silk hand-loom weaving. The woollen industry was killed off around 1700 by the English government, who wanted to keep the wool monopoly in England, although a minor revival was started around 1775. Despite problems, silk spinning and the manufacture of poplin, supported by the Royal Dublin Society, continued into the 19th century.

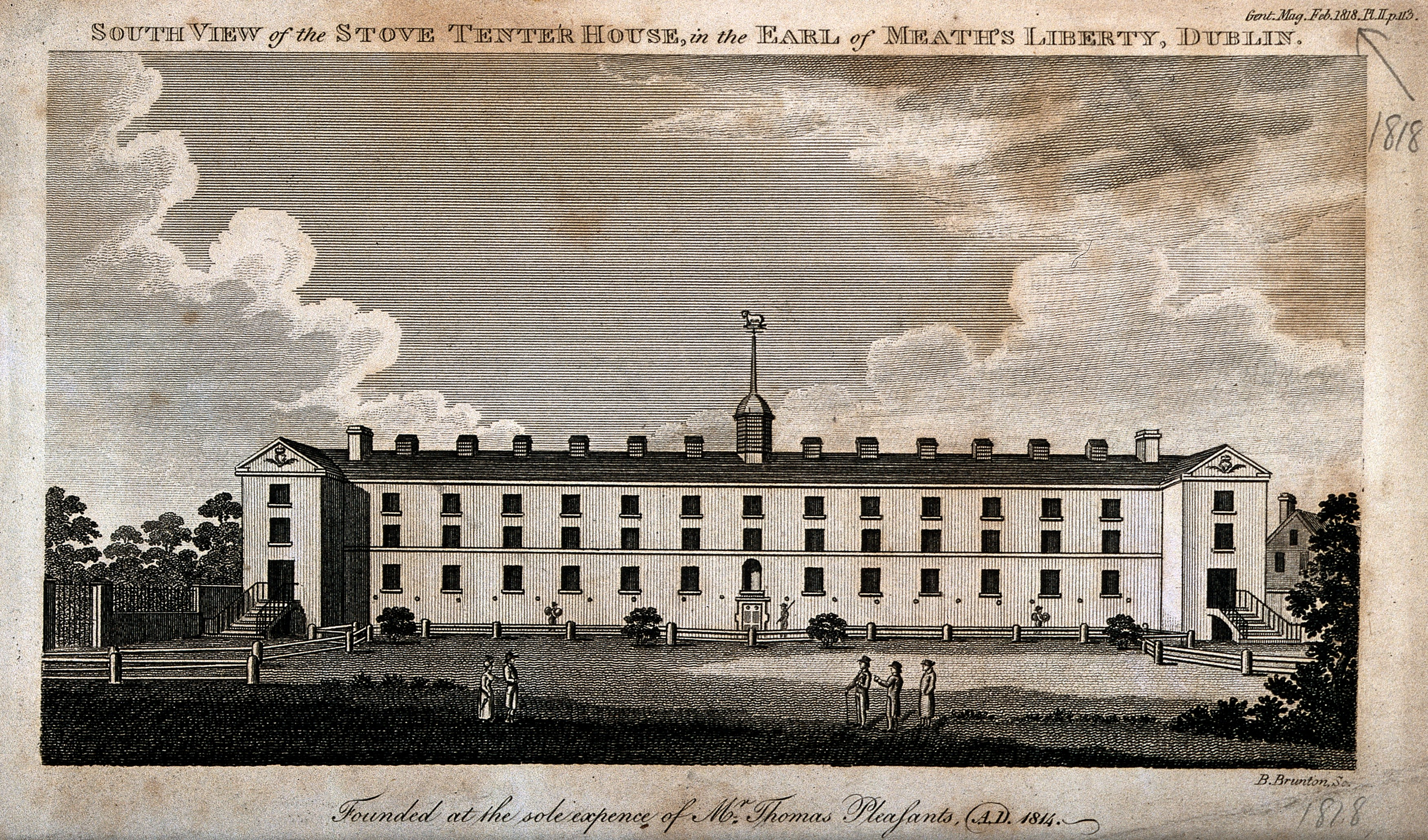
Stove Tenter House with grounds from an illustration of 1818.

The Tenter House was erected in 1815 on this street, financed by Thomas Pleasants. Before this, the poor weavers of the Liberties had either to suspend work in rainy weather or use the alehouse fire and thus were (as Wright expresses it) "exposed to great distress, and not infrequently reduced either to the hospital or the gaol." The Tenter House was a brick building 275 feet long, 3 stories high, and with a central cupola. It had a form of central heating powered by four furnaces, and provided a place for weavers to stretch their material in bad weather.

In 1861 a Carmelite priest bought the Tenter House and opened it as a refuge for the homeless. He ran the hostel for ten years until 1871 when the Sisters of Mercy came to Cork Street. In 1873 they built a convent and in 1874 a primary school, which closed down in 1989.

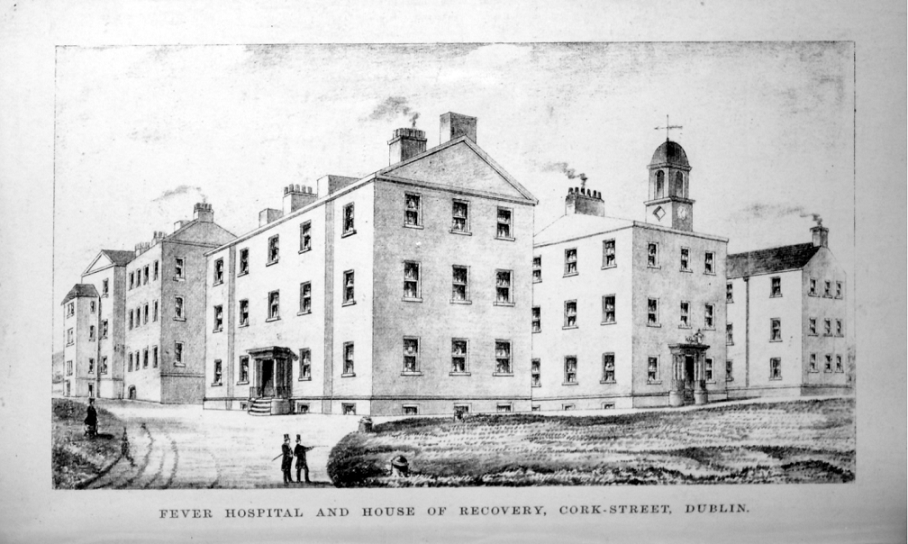
Cork Street Fever Hospital

The Cork Street Fever Hospital (also known as the House of Recovery) was a hospital that opened in Cork Street on 14 May 1804. The hospital was extended in 1817-1819 to help cope with a national typhus epidemic. In 1953 the Cherry Orchard Hospital in Ballyfermot replaced the old Cork Street hospital, which was renamed Brú Chaoimhín and became a nursing home.

Across the road from the hospital is the James Weir Home for Nurses, built in 1903. The site had once been a Quaker burial ground.

In 1932 the Maryland housing development off Cork Street was constructed by Dublin Corporation. 1932 was a Marian year, hence the name Maryland.

From as early as 1941 there were plans to widen the road, leading to buildings being left to fall into decay while the threat of compulsory purchase orders seemed possible. The road widening was eventually completed in 2003 and there followed an extensive reconstruction of the street including landmark residential buildings by O'Donnell & Tuomey Architects (the award-winning Timberyard social housing scheme, 2008) and FKL Architects and the development of a new park, Weaver Park, designed by Áit Urbanism + Landscape.
