= The Coombe, Dublin =

Street in Dublin, Ireland

Coordinates: 53.339°N 6.278°W

The Coombe
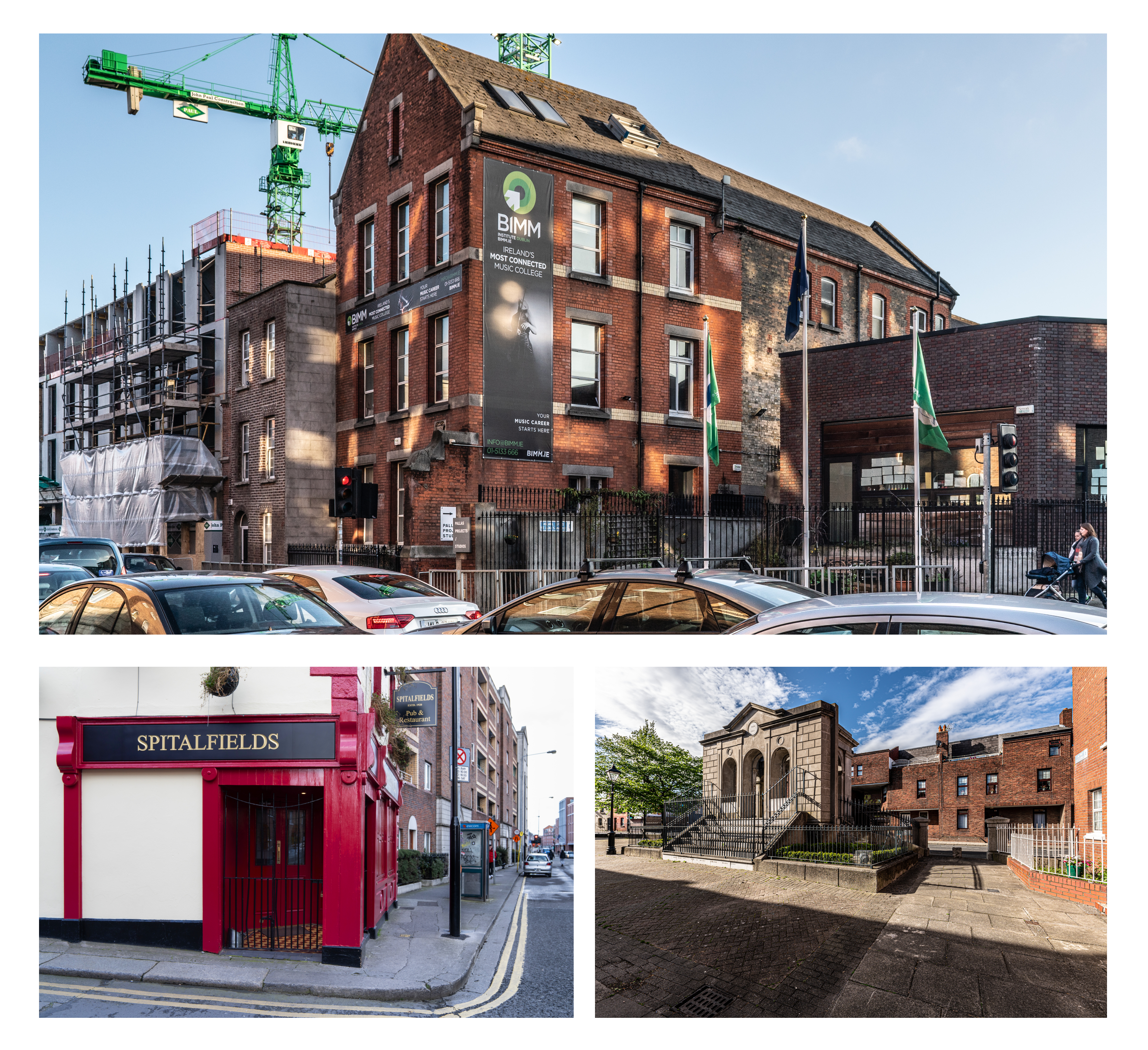
- Clockwise from top: Coombe campus of the British and Irish Modern Music Institute; the Coombe Hospital Memorial; Spitalfields pub

- Location within Central Dublin
- Native name: An Com (Irish)
- Namesake: Named after the Coombe Stream (from Irish com, "coom", valley)
- Length: 450 m (1,480 ft)
- Width: 15 metres (49 ft)
- Location: Dublin, Ireland
- Postal code: D08
- west end: Pimlico, Ardee Street
- east end: Francis Street, Dean Street

Other
- Known for: Coombe Women & Infants University Hospital

The Coombe (/ˈkuːm/; Irish: An Com) is a historic street in the south inner city of Dublin, Ireland. It was originally a hollow or valley where a tributary of the River Poddle, the Coombe Stream or Commons Water, ran. The name is sometimes used for the broader area around, in which the Poddle and its related watercourses featured strongly.

== History ==
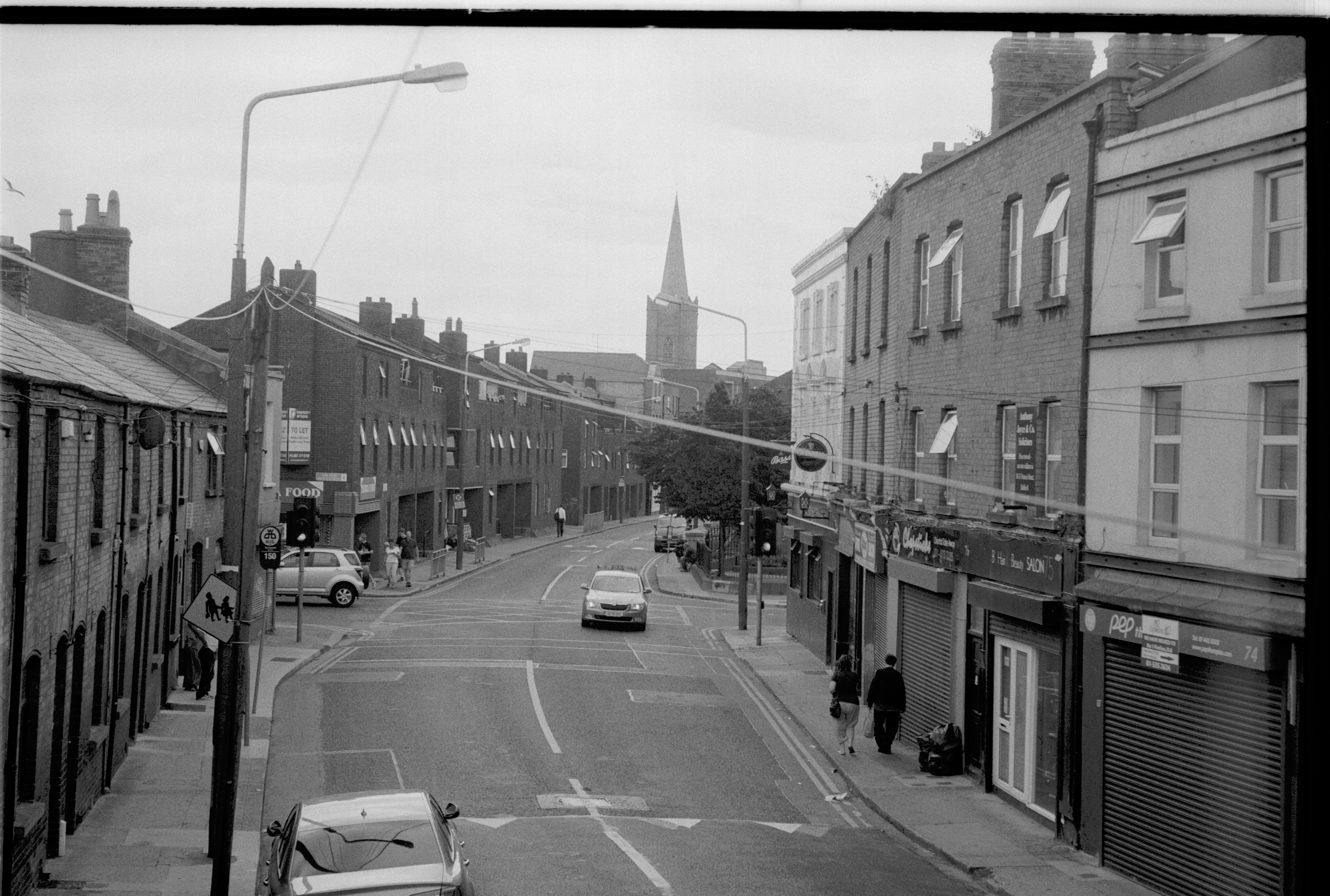
The Coombe, facing east

In the late 17th century economic development started to house the clothiers who were moving into this then suburban area. Woolen manufacture was set up by settlers from England, while many French settlers Huguenots took up silk weaving, using skills they had acquired in their home country. The Dutch constructed their own traditional style of house, known here as Dutch Billies, with gables that faced the street. Thousands of weavers became employed in the Coombe, Pimlico, Spitalfields and Weavers' Square.

This was in response to legislative changes and free trade policies from the newly independent Grattan's Parliament (1782). Prior to these changes, English woollen manufacturers felt threatened by the Irish industry and heavy duties were imposed on Irish wool exports. The Navigation Act was passed to prevent the Irish from exporting to the whole colonial market. In 1699 the English government passed the Wool Act which prevented export to any country whatsoever, which effectively put an end to the industry in the Liberties by the mid-eighteenth century. Later, under the repealed legislation, late in the following century, a revival took place by importing Spanish wool into Ireland. This was helped from 1775 by the Royal Dublin Society, but the events of 1798 and 1803, in which many weavers took part (and represented well in historical fiction The Silk Weaver by Gabrielle Warnock), and the economic decline that set in after the Napoleonic Wars and the Act of Union, prevented any further growth in this industry in the Liberties.

A Weavers' Hall was built by the Weavers' Guild in the Lower Coombe in 1682 and by 1745, when the building of a new hall was required, it was a Huguenot, David Digges La Touche, who advanced the £200 needed. The silk and poplin industries grew successfully in the first half of the 18th century. However, these industries, which were supported as mentioned by the Royal Dublin Society, were almost ruined by an act passed by the English government, which prevented the society from supporting any house where Irish silk goods were sold. When war was declared against France and raw materials were difficult to obtain, the silk weavers suffered greatly.

The Tenter House was erected just off the Coombe in 1815 in Cork Street, financed by Thomas Pleasants. Before this, the poor weavers of the Coombe had either to suspend work in rainy weather or use the alehouse fire and thus were (as Wright expresses it) "exposed to great distress, and not infrequently reduced either to the hospital or the gaol."

== Parishes ==
In the year 1708, an act of parliament was passed setting up a new Church of Ireland parish, St. Luke's, for the area. In conformity with the act, a Glebe House Was erected on the Coombe for the Vicar and the church of St. Luke was built just off the Coombe. Over the next few years new parish buildings including a school, an almshouse and a widows' house, were built along the Coombe to provide for the increasing population.

== Coombe Hospital ==
On 10 October 1770 Lord Brabazon laid the foundation stone of the new Meath Hospital in the Coombe. In 1774 it became the County Dublin Infirmary and in 1822 the patients were transferred to the new Meath Hospital at Long Lane. A few years later Mrs. Margaret Boyle founded the Coombe Lying-In Hospital in the vacated building. The Guinness family became benefactors and built a dispensary block. In 1967 the hospital was relocated to new premises in Cork Street. The old building was demolished to make way for a Dublin Corporation housing development, retaining the portico.

== The Aldermen of Skinners Alley ==
Off the Coombe once ran Skinners Alley, famous for its society of Aldermen. When King James II displaced the Protestant Corporation of Dublin to make room for Catholics, a few members of the original body sought refuge for themselves and the regalia of the city in this obscure nook. After the battle of the Boyne, they emerged from their concealment, presented themselves to King William and were by him accepted as the lawful representatives of Dublin. As the anniversary of their reinstatement came around, the corporators celebrated their deliverance with a banquet. In course of time, a convivial society was formed, calling themselves 'The Aldermen of Skinners Alley'.

Their song went as follows:

When tyranny's detested power
had leagued with superstition,
and bigot James, in evil hour
began his luckless mission,
still here survives the sacred flame,
here freedom's sons did rally
and consecrate to deathless fame
the Men of Skinners Alley.

== See also ==
- Biddy Mulligan the Pride of the Coombe

== References and sources ==
Notes

Sources

- Gilbert, John (1854). A History of the City of Dublin. Oxford: Oxford University.
- George Newenham Wright (2005). "An Historical Guide to the City of Dublin". Online book. Archived from the original on 31 October 2007.
- Craig, Maurice (1969). Dublin: 1660–1860. Dublin: Allen Figgis.
- Bennett, Douglas (1992). Encyclopedia of Dublin.
