= Pimlico, Dublin =

Area in Dublin city, Ireland

Coordinates: 53°20′28″N 6°16′54.4″W

Pimlico is an inner city area of Dublin, Ireland on the southside in Dublin 8. It lies between Thomas Court and Ardee Street. At the Thomas Court end of Pimlico is Pimlico Cottages. It is close to the St. James's Gate Guinness Brewery. Similar to other areas of Dublin's Liberties, such as The Coombe, Pimlico was historically home to families of weavers many of whom had emigrated from France via London.

The name Pimlico is likely one originally of American origin but borrowed laterly from Pimlico in London, England. Its first recorded usage in Dublin is from 1663 in state letters from the Earl of Orrery to the Duke of Ormonde.

The influx of French Huguenots and Jewish immigrants and commercial activity in the area is said to have given the area various unusual sounding names including streets such as Fumbally Lane and Tripoli.

== In music ==
The area is mentioned in The Banks of Pimlico, a 19th century music hall song.

Other songs associated with Pimlico include Pete St John's Dublin in the Rare Old Times. Recorded by artists including Dublin City Ramblers, The Dubliners, and Flogging Molly, the song is sung in the voice of one Sean Dempsey, "born hard and late in Pimlico, in a house that ceased to be".
