= Thomas Pleasants =

Irish merchant and philanthropist (1729–1818)

- Born: 1729
- Died: 1818 (aged 88–89)
- Occupations: Merchant; property developer
- Known for: Philanthropy

Thomas Pleasants (1729-1818) was a merchant, property developer and philanthropist in Dublin, Ireland, after whom Pleasants Street in Dublin 8 was named on its opening in 1821.

== Life ==
Pleasants was born in County Carlow in 1729, son of William Pleasants and his wife Grace Edwards. His grandfather was Thomas Pleasants, alderman of Dublin and Sheriff of Dublin City in 1702.

His grandfather had leased a large piece of land near Capel Street from Dublin Corporation, which Pleasants inherited some time after his grandfather's death in 1729. His initial income derived from this property, though he also had dealings with his cousins the Pasleys, who were wine merchants at 9 Abbey Street.

He married in 1787 Mildred Daunt, second daughter of George and Hannah Daunt, surgeon in Mercer's Hospital.

They lived at 23 South William Street, Dublin.

He and his wife (died 1814) were buried in the churchyard of St Bride's Church. On his wife's death he inherited a large fortune estimated to be around £90,000 resulting in a lawsuit between Pleasants and the Daunt family who wanted him to receive an annuity.

== Donations ==
In his final years and in his will Pleasants left many large sums to various charitable causes.

He donated £700 to the Royal Dublin Society in 1815 for building of a pair of porter's lodges in the Botanic gardens in Glasnevin upon which he became an honorary member. He also donated them his large library.

£8,000 was donated for the building of the Meath Hospital.

He also financed the reprinting of Reflections and resolutions proper for the gentlemen of Ireland by Samuel Madden.

=== Cork street fever hospital ===
He donated £5,000 in canal debentures for the benefit of the Cork Street Fever Hospital.

=== Stove tenter house ===
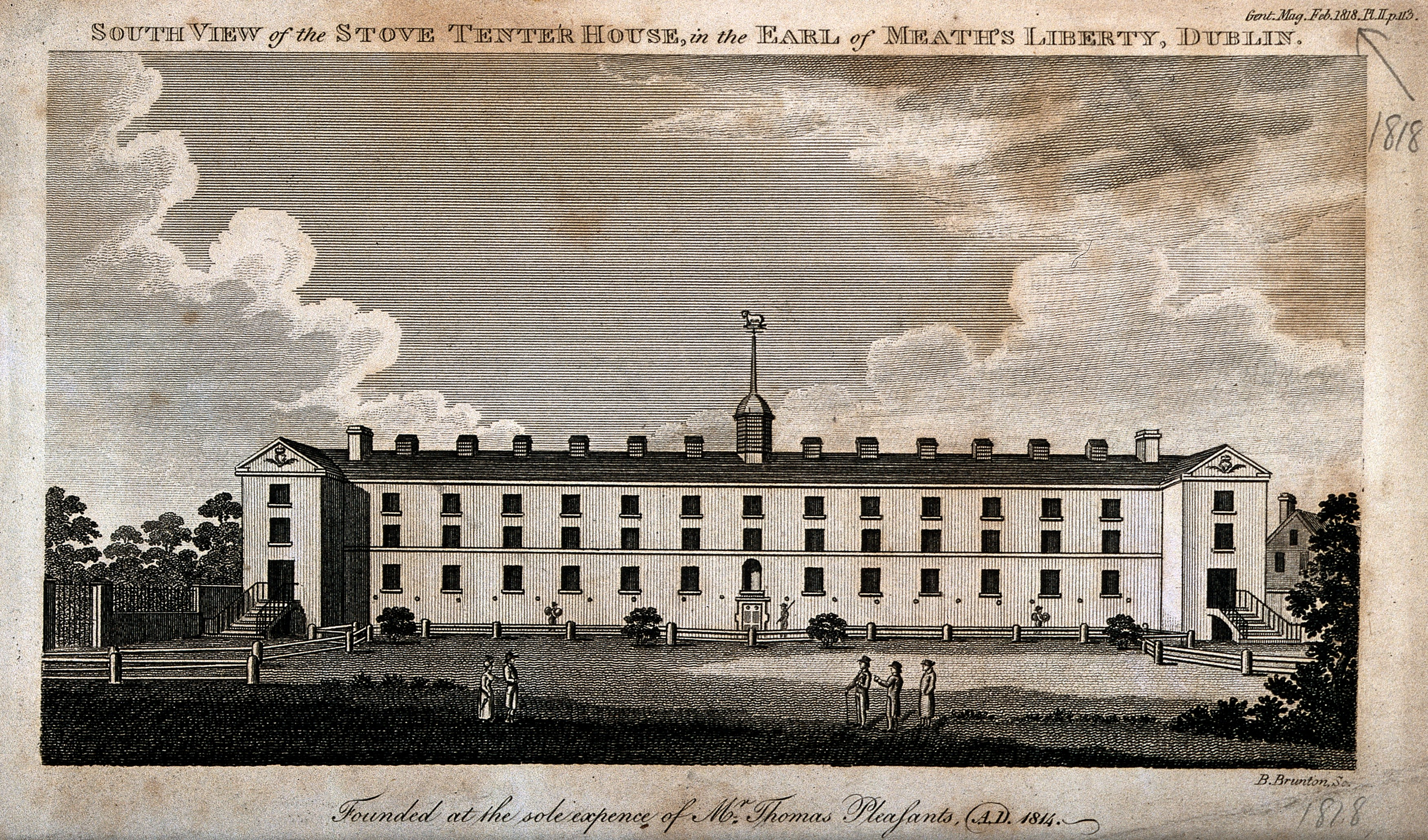
Stove Tenter House with grounds from an illustration of 1818 in the Gentleman's Magazine.

Among his donations were over £13,000 in 1814-15 for the erection of the Stove Tenter House off Cork Street for poor weavers in the Liberties who prior to this would have had to suspend work in rainy weather.

=== Pleasants asylum ===
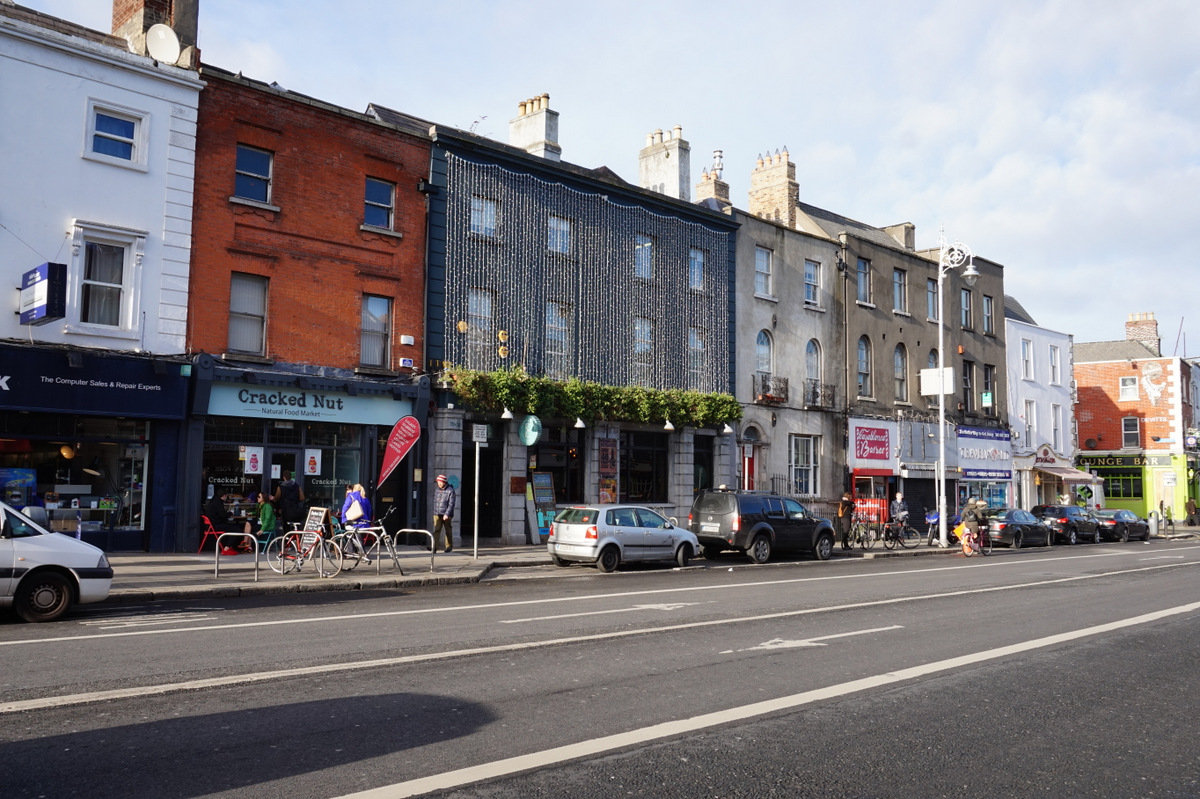
Thomas Pleasants former house and later asylum (third from right) at present day 75 Camden Street, Dublin.

On his death in 1818, Pleasants bequeathed his own house at 67 Camden Street (modern day number 75) for the provision of a protestant girls' school and orphanage along with his largest donation of £15,000 and £1,200 per annum to run it. Extra money was provided for dowries for the girls (only applied to Protestants) to marry. His friends and relations including Reverend Thomas Gamble, Joshua Pasley and Samuel Coates acted as the first three governors and their names were inscribed on a plaque on the front of the building.

The building had originally been acquired by Pleasants in 1814 after his move from South William Street and was likely built around 1790.

The orphanage was amalgamated with Kirwan House orphanage and the T.P. Dormer Trust in 1949.
