= Valerie Place =

Irish nurse and overseas aid worker

- Born: 24 March 1969; Walkinstown, Dublin, Ireland
- Died: 22 February 1993 (aged 23); Mogadishu, Somalia

Valerie Place (24 March 1969 - 22 February 1993) was an Irish nurse and overseas aid worker, who was the second western aid worker to be killed in Somalia during the conflict and famine in the early 1990s.

== Early life ==
Valerie Place was born at 20 St Brendan's Crescent, Walkinstown, Dublin on 24 March 1969. She was the third child of Patrick, coachbuilder, and Margaret Place (née Byrne). She had three brothers and two sisters. Place attended St Paul's secondary school, Greenhills, and was trained as a nurse at St. James's Hospital, Dublin from 1987 to 1990. She worked for a period with Caring and Sharing Association (CASA).

== Career ==
Place went to Somalia in September 1992 as a volunteer worker on a two-year contract with Concern, the Irish overseas aid agency. Concern had been part of the international emergency response in Somalia since May 1992. Place was one of 70 Irish aid workers based in 17 locations across Somalia. She was the supervisor of a feeding station for 2,500 children and an adjoining school in Mogadishu. The aid workers worked with local guards, and later the Unified Task Force of 30,000 troops to secure the areas for the distribution of humanitarian relief. The task force struggled to protect the aid convoys from attacks from armed groups.

== Death and legacy ==
Place was travelling in a party, which included Rev. Aengus Finucane, on 22 February 1993 to attend the opening of a school in Wanlewein for 1,200 when the party was ambushed. Place was fatally wounded when her car, the last in the convoy, was ambushed at Afgoi. She was airlifted to a military hospital in Mogadishu by a US Air Force helicopter, but died within minutes of her arrival there. Place's funeral at the Church of the Holy Spirit, Greenhills, Dublin was attended by 2,000 people, including Irish President Mary Robinson. Robinson had met Place during her visit to Somalia in October 1992.

At the time of her death, Place was the second western aid worker killed in Somalia, after the death of Sean Devereux in January 1993. Place's death caused demands that the task force do more to protect aid workers and to disarm the Somali factions, as well as prompting fresh criticism of the UN mandate in its failure to support military intervention with political initiatives. As the situation worsened, American troops withdrew in March 1994, and the UN disengaged in March 1995.

The Irish Department of Foreign Affairs founded the Valerie Place commemorative scholarship in March 1993, which brings Somali teachers and nurses to train in Ireland. In June 1997, St. James's Hospital school of nursing unveiled a portrait and a classroom dedicated to her memory. There is also a mural to Place in Mogadishu.
