= Perrystown =

Suburb of Dublin, Ireland

Perrystown Baile Pheire
- Suburb
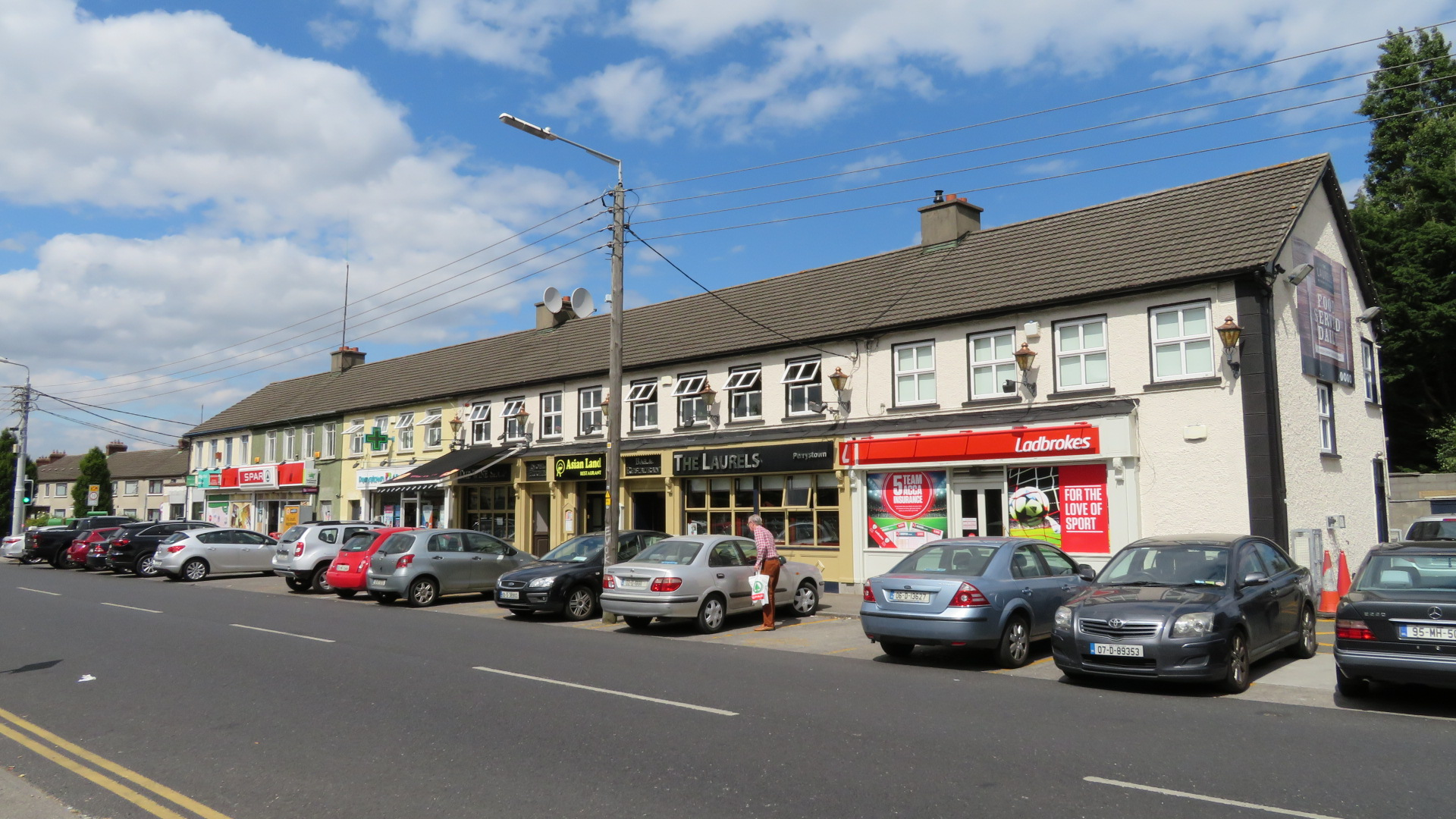
- Shopping centre in Perrystown

- Location in Ireland Perrystown (Dublin)
- Coordinates: 53.310°N 6.314°W
- Country: Ireland
- Province: Leinster
- County: County Dublin

Area
  - Total: 0.36 km^{2} (0.14 sq mi)
- Time zone: UTC+0 (WET)
  - Summer (DST): UTC-1 (IST (WEST))
- Eircode routing key: D12

Perrystown (Irish: Baile Pheire) is a suburb of Dublin, Ireland. It is adjacent to the areas of Crumlin, Greenhills, Kimmage, Templeogue, Terenure, and Walkinstown.

== Location and transport ==
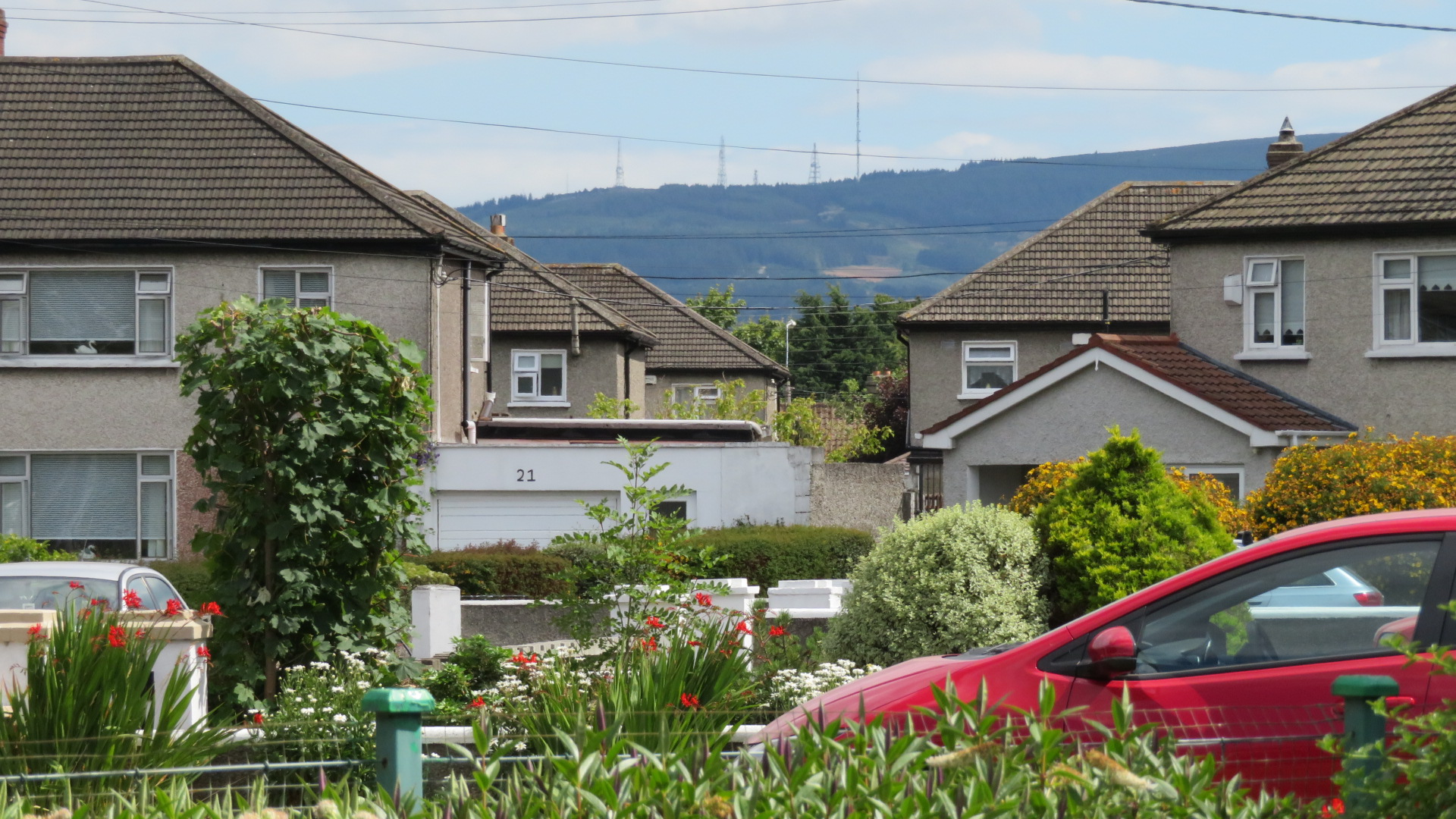
The Dublin Mountains are visible from Perrystown (Three Rock Mountain pictured).

Perrystown lies just north of the River Poddle, six kilometres east-northeast of the river's source. Old Ordnance Survey maps show the townland having an area of 89 acres, 3 roods, and 35 perches, which is equivalent to 36.41 hectares (0.36 square kilometres).

The district is directly serviced by the 15A and 150 bus routes. The 9, 17, 54A, and 83 bus routes all serve Perrystown's surrounding areas.

The closest light rail link is Kylemore Luas Stop on the Naas Road. There is no mainline train service.

== Services ==
The local primary school is St. Damian's, and the area's Roman Catholic parish church is the Church of the Holy Spirit, Kimmage Manor.

The Ashleaf Shopping Centre is to the north of Perrystown, containing a Dunnes Stores and several other small outlets. There is another shopping area, including the Perrystown Post Office, on Whitehall Road West.

There are two pubs in the area – The Laurels gastropub on Whitehall Road West and The Pines café bar and restaurant on Whitehall Road.

== Sport ==
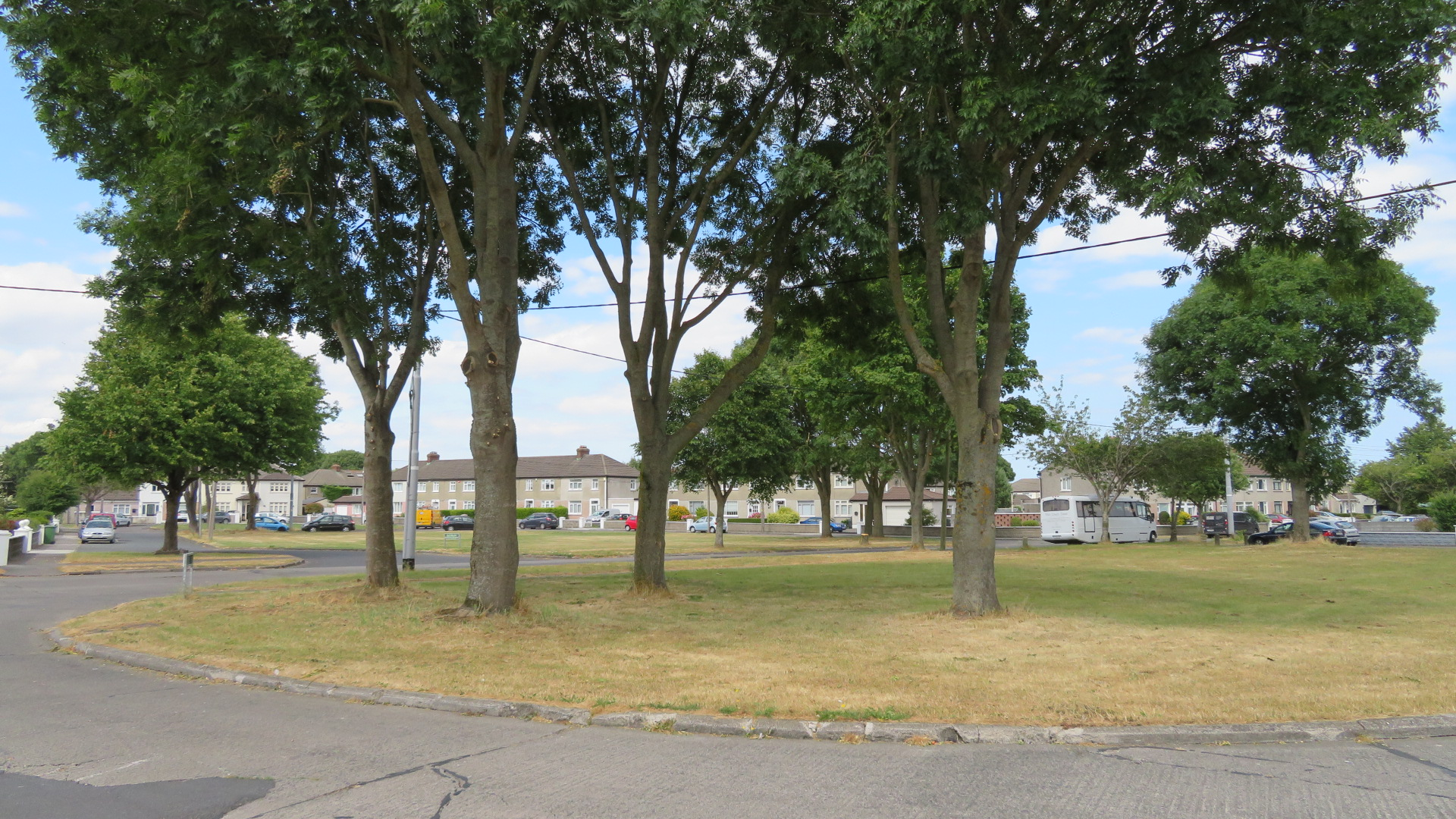
Open recreation area amid housing on Muckross Grove, Perrystown.

The local community centre hosts the PME Variety Group, Robert Emmet's GAA Club, and Manortown United Football Club.

There is a large badminton centre, the Terenure Badminton Centre, on Whitehall Road. In 2018 and 2019, the bar upstairs in this badminton centre served as the sole Irish venue for the World Quizzing Championship, an individual event that is held simultaneously in many countries around the world for one day each year, normally in June.

The cyclists competing in Stage 1 of the 1998 Tour de France (which started in Ireland that year) passed within 100 yards of the village of Perrystown during this stage (Greentrees Road - Willington Roundabout - Templeville Road) on the way to 1987 Tour de France winner Stephen Roche's hometown of Dundrum in Dublin, and finished back in Dublin City Centre via County Wicklow to complete the stage.

== Political geography ==
Perrystown is in the county of South Dublin and in the local electoral area of Rathfarnham–Templeogue for elections to South Dublin County Council. The north-eastern edge of the suburb forms part of the boundary with the Dublin City Council administrative area. Perrystown is also part of the Dublin 12 postal district.

Perrystown is in the Dáil constituency of Dublin South-Central.

== Notable people ==
- Sonny Knowles — showband singer
- Niall Quinn — former Ireland football international
- Anthony Stokes — Ireland football international

== See also ==
- List of towns and villages in Ireland
