= The City Basin, Dublin =

Former water reservoir in Dublin, Ireland

Coordinates: 53.3414°N 6.2912°W

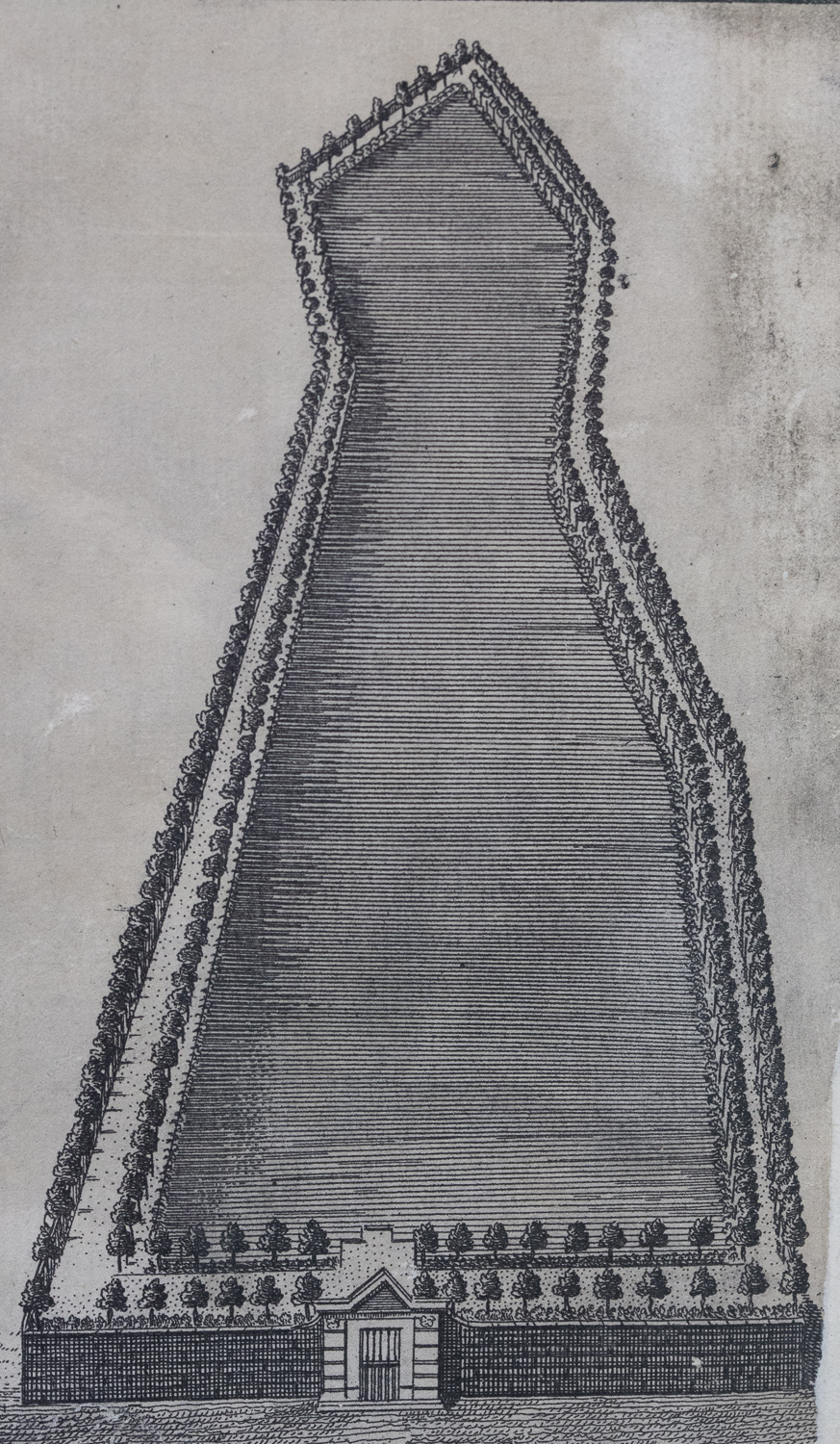
An illustration of the new city basin taken from Charles Brooking's map of Dublin (1728).

The City Basin was a public reservoir and cistern constructed near St James' Street, Dublin around 1721 to supply the City of Dublin with water. It was later expanded by connection to the adjacent and newly completed Grand Canal Harbour from 1785.

The basin had various iterations before being supplemented primarily by the Blessington Street Basin on the North side of the city around 1810 and finally being replaced by a modern water system from Vartry Reservoir around 1869.

The basin itself was later filled in and replaced by Basin Street Flats in the 1960s and Oisín Kelly park in the 1980s. The adjacent Grand Canal Harbour also fell out of use around 1960 and was filled in soon after to be finally replaced by apartments in 2023.

== History ==
=== Medieval period ===
In 1308, it was recorded that John Le Decer, mayor or provost of Dublin, installed two public pipes to supply the city with a freshwater source. These pipes were located at High Street and at Cornmarket and seem to have replaced an earlier water system which was already present. The source of the water was by way of a diversion of part of the Dodder at Balrothery weir near Firhouse in the southern hills of Dublin.

In historical accounts, this is often referred to as the city watercourse.

Around the year 1555, a tongue was created near Kimmage to divert two-thirds of the city watercourse into what was known as the Earl of Meath's watercourse combining with the River Poddle in the city proper to significantly boost the water supply. This water helped to drive early industrial development in the Liberties for breweries, tanneries and other emerging industries.

The other third of the water supply was diverted along the city watercourse proper and was carried westward at an elevated level to supply the higher parts of the city with water.

=== 1660 improvements ===
In 1660, the demand for water had exceeded the supply and alterations and improvements to the watercourse and a new basin were undertaken with a subterranean course under Thomas Street to a smaller underground cistern at New Row in the Liberties. From there a 6-inch pipe went over the old bridge to supply the North side of the city.

A few years after around 1671, pipes were laid by Dublin Corporation across much of the city to supply a water source directly to streets.

=== 1721 basin ===
In 1721, Dublin Corporation decided to build a more modern and extensive basin for the needs of the evolving Georgian city supplied by the River Dodder via the city watercourse as its sole original source. In order to maintain water pressure in the city and effectively distribute the water it was necessary to construct a raised course through masonry and embankments through Dolphin's Barn and Kilmainham to a basin adjacent to the newly constructed South Dublin Union and Foundling Hospital. This area is sometimes referred to as the Back of the Pipes as a result.

James Scanlan was employed as an engineer to carry out the works after an invitation which included submissions from Richard Castle and Gabriel Stokes.

Around 1735, the corporation also purchased mills and weirs at Islandbridge for £3,500 to further supplement the water supply and constructed a large mill and pump to further add to the water supply.

The area around the basin was also lined with lime and elm trees and an ornamental gate around this time and became a fashionable park for citizens of the city over the following decades.

=== 1775 improvements ===
City of Dublin (No. 2) Act 1775
- Act of Parliament
- Parliament of Ireland
- Long title: An Act for the better regulating the pipe water of the city of Dublin.
- Citation: 15 & 16 Geo. 3. c. 24 (I)

Dates
- Royal assent: 4 April 1776

By 1776 there were water shortages in the city. In the later 18th century, water was taken from the recently constructed Grand Canal and mixed with water from the Dodder. This was undertaken by virtue of passing an act of Parliament, the City of Dublin (No. 2) Act 1775 (15 & 16 Geo. 3. c. 24 (I)), and entering into a contract with the owners of the Grand Canal for an ample supply of water.

Later again in 1806, the corporation entered into 60-year agreements for a supply of water from both the Grand and Royal Canal on the opposite side of the city.

The supply of water from the Grand Canal was eventually deemed unsafe and was eventually ceased in 1869 with the resultant Vartry Reservoir developed around the same time.

== Grand Canal Harbour (1785) ==
A harbour was completed in 1785 by the Grand Canal Company adjacent to the basin as the terminus of the completed Grand Canal. It originally included two rectangular basins connected by a short canal but was later extended to include an extension with a semi-circular basin at its end.

The harbour was later supplemented with a circle line canal and the larger Grand Canal Dock constructed from around 1790-96 rather than an earlier proposal for a system of locks linking the Liffey directly from James Street.

=== Bond harbour (1786) ===
In 1786 a separate rectangular spur off the first basin was completed to a new square-shaped harbour by Sir James Bond, 1st Baronet on a speculative basis intending to create a separate market for produce imported from the midlands. This plan was later abandoned around 1817 and later the basin was partially filled-in around 1885-86 to construct a Guinness Malt House partially using the old harbour as its private wharf for loading materials. This harbour remained in use until 1959.

== Sources ==
- Simms, Dr. J. G. (1977-12-01). "Dublin in 1776". Dublin Historical Record. 31 (1). Dublin: Old Dublin Society: 2–13. JSTOR 30104025.
