= Jack Finucane =

Irish Catholic missionary and co-founder of Concern

- Born: Limerick, Ireland
- Died: Kimmage, Ireland
- Citizenship: Ireland
- Education: Holy Ghost College, Kimmage
- Known for: Supplying food to the population in Biafra
- Relatives: Aengus Finucane (brother)

Jack Finucane (1937 – 7 June 2017) was a Roman Catholic missionary of the Spiritan Fathers order, who with his brother Aengus Finucane, organized food shipments from Ireland to the Igbo people during the Nigerian Civil War. He was a co-founder and leader of Concern Worldwide, a global aid agency.

== Biography ==
=== Early life ===
Finucane was born in 1937, in the city of Limerick, Ireland, along with his twin brother. He was educated by the Congregation of Christian Brothers. He joined the Holy Ghost Fathers and was ordained in 1963. He taught for a time in Rockwell before going on missionary work to Africa. Following his work in Nigeria, he worked in the United States and studied in San Francisco for a Masters in Education.

=== Concern Worldwide ===
Jack was sent to Nigeria, and, along with his brother Aengus, he was involved in the provision of humanitarian aid during the Nigerian Civil War, and the founding and creation of Concern Worldwide. He was expelled from Nigeria along with the other Spiritans and returned to Ireland.

In 1973, he was posted to Bangladesh, during the war of independence with (West) Pakistan.

Jack worked with Concern in Ethiopia during the 1984 famine. He advised Bob Geldof and in 1985 showed Bono around on his first visit. Bono referred to Jack as the John Wayne of aid workers.

Returning to Dublin in 1991, he became a regional director for Concern Worldwide, until he officially retired in 2002. He went in 2004 to Sudan during the Darfur conflict. In 2005, he headed up Concern's relief efforts in Sri Lanka following the tsunami.

== Death ==
He died suddenly in Kimmage Manor, on Wednesday 7 June 2017, and is buried in the Spiritan plot in Dardistown Cemetery.
