= The Back of the Pipes, Dublin =

Former lane and locale in central Dublin, Ireland

The Back of the Pipes was the name of a lane and pipe route in Dublin 8, Ireland, located between Dolphin's Barn and James's Walk. The lane replaced a Grand Canal branch which ultimately fed the Dublin city basin (now replaced with Basin Lane / Basin Street) and the Grand Canal Harbour.

It ran along the remote end of the back gardens of the houses on Reuben Street from the Dolphin's Barn end across from the site of the now demolished Leinster Cinema at 37 Dolphin's Barn Street, down the back of Fatima Mansions, on past the back gardens of the houses between Mallin Ave and Lourdes Road, past the "stone sofa" and finally came out at James's Walk across from the old iron footbridge.

It took its name from an important part of the Dublin water supply originally erected in the years following 1245.

== City watercourse ==
The main water supply for the city of Dublin prior to the arrival of the Hiberno-Normans in the twelfth century was the river Poddle. The Liffey was tidal up to Islandbridge and thus undrinkable. Due to increased growth and development after their arrival it became imperative for the authorities to provide a greatly increased water supply. The monks of the Abbey of St. Thomas in 1242 diverted part of the River Dodder at Balrothery weir near Firhouse via a man-made channel to the River Poddle at Kimmage. This canal passed through Templeogue and joined the River Tymon, forming the Poddle. The flow was separated at Mount Argus, near Mount Jerome Cemetery, by a construction known as the Tongue, one third of the flow being allocated to the city basin or cistern. This part of the flow left the Poddle proper and proceeded to St. James Terrace in Dolphin's Barn. It advanced on to James's Walk on the summit of an elevated rampart of earth and stone which became known as the "Back of the Pipes" or the "Ridges", to a cistern near the present Waterworks Headquarters at Marrowbone Lane.

== History ==
This watercourse supplied the city for over five hundred years. It also supplied the mills of the Abbey of St. Thomas at Thomas Court, and was a source of bitter contention between the citizens and the Abbot; the latter eventually agreeing to pay "yerly out of ther myllis without any contradiction, unto the Keper of the watyr of the cittie for the tyme beyng eyght busselis of corn, that ys to say four peckes of whet and four peckes of malt," for the use of the said water-course. In 1555 the Mayor of Dublin was given authority to keep the whole course from the Dodder to Dolphin's Barn. However disputes arose between the city authorities and the Earl of Meath, who controlled the Liberty of St. Thomas, so that in the 18th century it was the joint property of the city and the Earls of Meath.

The ancient records of Dublin city have numerous references concerning the upkeep of these water works. One of the earliest is a request from King Henry III in 1245 for a water supply for the King's Hall. The lead pipe which carried this supply was uncovered in Castle Street, next to Dublin Castle, in 1787, with an inscription from the 13th century. The rebel followers of Silken Thomas in 1534, according to Hollinshed's Chronicles, "cut the pipes of the conduits whereby (the city) should be destitute of fresh water".

In 1721 the Corporation reconstructed and raised the level of the City Basin at St James Gate, in the final development of the Poddle supply.

The lane was taken into the surrounding properties but the rampart remains at the end of the gardens backing onto its former location.

== The locality ==
The locality contained the Old Leinster Cinema (later the Dublin Ice Rink, now modern apartments) near Reuben Street and Emerald Square. Fatima Mansions and Lourdes Road backed on to the "Pipes". This part of the Grand Canal has been filled in and the Luas now runs along it. The visitors' centre at Guinness's brewery is a few minutes walk away from the other end of the "Pipes".

The Back of the Pipes was a popular meeting place for courting couples in the 19th century and much later into the 20th century. A place nearby where they would stroll was called the "Stone Sofa", located at St. James Walk.

In Dublin slang "at the back of the pipes" became a response to an enquiry regarding the unknown whereabouts of an object or person.
