= Sonny Knowles =

Irish singer (1932–2018)

Sonny Knowles (Born Thomas Knowles 2 November 1932 – 15 November 2018) was an Irish singer who performed show band and BBC cabaret songs.

Knowles was born in Dublin to Tommy and Mary Knowles. He was brought up in The Liberties in Dublin and moved permanently to Muckross Park in Perrystown in south Dublin after his marriage. His early career began when he started playing the clarinet and saxophone at the Dublin Music School. As a young man he joined the Johnny Butler Band followed by Earl Gill's Band, the Pacific Showband and then Dermot O'Brien's showband. His decision to go solo at the peak of the cabaret era, opened up his career.

Knowles had two songs in the 1966 Irish National Song Contest scoring no points with both songs and finishing in equal 10th with himself. The two songs were "The Menace from Ennis" and an Irish Gaelic entry "Chuaigh mé suas don chluiche mór" (I Went Up for the Big Game). In the Irish final of 1971 he would again score no points with his song An fhaid a mhairim.

Knowles twice survived oesophageal cancer and after his most recent battle, curtailed his lifestyle somewhat but still performed.

Knowles died on 15 November 2018 at his home, aged 86.
