= Greenhills, Dublin =

Suburb of Dublin, Ireland

Greenhills Na Glaschnoic (Irish)
- Suburb
- Location in Dublin Location in Ireland
- Coordinates: 53°18′46″N 6°20′05″W
- Country: Ireland
- Province: Leinster
- County: County Dublin

Government
  - Dáil constituency: Dublin South-West
  - Local authority: South Dublin County Council
- Eircode routing key: D12

Greenhills (Irish: Na Glaschnoic) is a suburb of Dublin, Ireland. It is in County Dublin and lies between Kimmage, Tallaght, Ballymount, Templeogue, Terenure and Walkinstown, which the area of Greenhills was historically part of, and includes several residential developments. Greenhills is in the Dublin postal district of Dublin 12 and the local government area of South Dublin.

== Name and history ==
The area's name comes from the sand-based hills that made up a glacial esker which formed in the area at the end of the Ice Age.

Greenhills may have housed settlements since at least the Bronze Age, as an urn dating from that time was found in the area in the late 1890s. Discovered in a former quarry between the Greenhills Road and St. Columba's Road, this urn is now held by the National Museum of Ireland. However, the area was mostly farmland until expansion in the 1950s and 1960s, when new housing estates were built.

== Facilities ==
Tymon Park is partly situated in the old townland of Greenhills and is located to the south of the Limekiln estate. It is administered by South Dublin County Council. The River Poddle and connected artificial ponds are features within the park. The M50 motorway splits the Greenhills side of the park from Kilnamanagh and the Tymon North estate (both in Tallaght). A smaller park, Greenhills Park, is also administered by the South Dublin County Council and is used for soccer.

The Church of the Holy Spirit is the local Roman Catholic church. It has a verdigris copper roof. The church stands beside a community centre, which has function rooms, and advice, adult education and other services.

Local primary schools include Holy Spirit Junior and Senior Schools which were formed in September 2015 following the amalgamation of St. Paul's Junior and Senior Girl's National Schools, and St. Peter's Boy's National School. Riverview Educate Together National School opened on Limekiln Road in 2016. Secondary schools include St. Paul's Secondary (girls) and Greenhills College VEC (boys).

== Transport ==
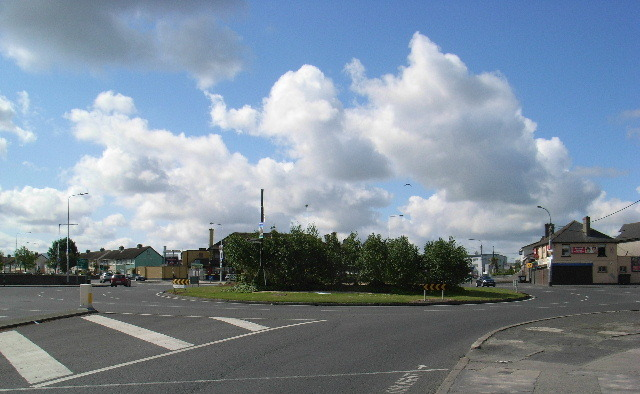
Walkinstown Roundabout

The Walkinstown Roundabout, or Walkinstown Cross, is a junction which serves six local roads: the Greenhills Road into Tallaght, Ballymount Road towards Ballymount and the M50, Walkinstown Avenue towards Ballyfermot, Walkinstown Road towards Drimnagh, Cromwellsfort Road towards Kimmage and Crumlin, and St. Peter's Road towards Greenhills and Templeogue.

The area is served by Dublin Bus routes F3, 15A, 27, 77A, 77X, Nitelink 77N and 150.

== Sport ==
The former Irish international football manager, Brian Kerr, lives in Greenhills, having been brought up in nearby Drimnagh. Michael Carruth, a gold-medal winner in the welterweight boxing division at the 1992 Summer Olympics, is from the area.

Soccer is one of the main sports in the area, through clubs such as Greenhills FC and Manortown United, while Gaelic football is also played, with clubs such as Crumlin GAA, Robert Emmets GAC, St Jude's GAA (Templeogue), Faughs (Templeogue) and St. James Gaels. Community Games athletics and rounders are also played - the latter represented by Limekiln Rounders Club which has won a number of national titles.

Olympian Gymnastics is based in Greenhills at a facility beside the NCT centre.

== Administration ==
Greenhills is in the northwest of South Dublin, and in elections to South Dublin County Council is part of the local electoral area of Templeogue–Terenure. Greenhills is part of the Dáil constituency of Dublin South-West.
