= Aengus Finucane =

Irish missionary

- Born: Corneilus Finucane; 26 April 1932; Limerick, Ireland
- Died: 6 October 2009 (aged 77); Kimmage, Ireland
- Citizenship: Ireland
- Education: Holy Ghost College Kimmage, University College Dublin, Swansea University
- Known for: Supplying food to the population in Biafra (leading to the creation of Concern)
- Relatives: Jack Finucane C.S.Sp. (brother)

Aengus Finucane (26 April 1932 – 6 October 2009) was a Roman Catholic missionary of the Spiritan Fathers order, who organized food shipments from Ireland to the Igbo people during the Nigerian Civil War. His younger brother Jack Finucane also became a Holy Ghost priest, and a sister of theirs became a nun.

== Biography ==
=== Early life ===
Finucane was born on 26 April 1932, in the city of Limerick, Ireland. He was educated by the Congregation of Christian Brothers until 1950. He joined the Holy Ghost Fathers in Kimmage Manor, and studied philosophy, Theology and Education in University College Dublin. He was ordained, in Clonliffe College, in 1958.

=== Career ===
Finucane contributed humanitarian aid during the Nigerian Civil War (also known as the "Nigerian-Biafran War"), from 1967 to 1970. The Nigerian government had blocked food supplies to the successionist state of Biafra causing starvation in the country. This was reported on international television stations and received worldwide condemnation.

In an effort to save the population from starvation, Finucane organized food to be sent through makeshift airstrips, including one at Uli, Bafaria, and cargo trips with other Dublin-based workers. This led to the formation of the organisation Concern Worldwide in 1968. Finucane worked with Concern for 41 years and viewed his mission as "love in action".

Finucane was banished from Nigeria in January 1970. Following this, he gained a diploma in development studies and a Masters of Arts degree in Third World poverty studies from the Swansea University. In 1971, he was again giving food supplies to the population during the operations which were ongoing in Bangladesh and flew often with Mother Teresa during the drop-offs.

The United Nations High Commissioner for Refugees (UNHCR) invited Finucane to lead a survey of people displaced in Southeast Asia. During the 1980s and 1990s Finucane led aid agency Concern Worldwide, becoming involved in the response to famine in Ethiopia, Sudan, Somalia and Rwanda. While in Somalia, he was in a convoy that was attacked which resulted in the death of nurse Valerie Place.

=== Published biography ===
Finucane's biography, Aengus Finucane: In the Heart of Concern, written by Deirdre Purcell was published by New Island Books in January 2015.

== Death ==
Finucane died of cancer on 6 October 2009 in a Dublin Spiritan Fathers' nursing home in Kimmage Manor at the age of 77. His funeral was held at the Church of the Holy Spirit, Kimmage and was attended by hundreds. The Minister for Foreign Affairs, Micheál Martin and Minister for Overseas Development, Peter Power dubbed him as a "tireless force for good across the globe for more than four decades". Finucane is buried at Dardistown Cemetery, in the Spiritan plot.
