= Ballymount =

Suburban locality, Dublin, Ireland

Ballymount Baile an Mhóta (Irish)
- Area
- Location in Dublin
- Coordinates: 53.31551°N 6.351603°W
- Country: Ireland
- Province: Leinster
- County: County Dublin
- Local authority: South Dublin County Council

Ballymount (Irish: Baile an Mhóta, meaning 'town of the moat'), is a locality on the southside of Dublin, near the mainly residential areas of Walkinstown to the east, Tallaght to the west and Greenhills to the south. Ballymount is accessed by a number of public bus routes from Dublin city centre, and via the Red Cow Stop on the Red Luas Line, and it houses one of the largest industrial zones in Ireland.

== Area ==
Ballymount is divided by the M50 motorway. On the west side of the divide is the more residential area of Kingswood, and most of the industrial land is on the east. Companies based in Ballymount include Smurfit Westrock, Virgin Media Television, Johnson Brothers (a division of the Primeline Group), and the bus depot of Go-Ahead Ireland.

== History ==
In Ballymount Park, on the western boundary of Ballymount, contains the ruins of Ballymount castle, also known as Kingswood Castle. The castle was built in 1622 by Sir William Parsons. The original name give to the area was Bellamount ("beautiful mount") in reference to the pre-existing mound (Bronze Age grave). In the early 18th century Ballymount Great was home to Mr John Butler, son of Sir Toby Butler, Solicitor General for Ireland to King James II. It is John Butler who is reputed to have built the folly (sham ruin) for his daughter's wedding day. It was never a fully built structure but as the name implies a fake ruin. The castle was the subject of a 1767 drawing by Gabriel Beranger.

At the end of the 18th century, the lands of Garranstown and Kingswood merged under the ownership of the Cullen family. The house retained the name Whitehall given to it by Mr Theo White. In William Duncan's maps of the County of Dublin, the area is shown bearing both names, a practice that is still carried on with maps to this day. In 1865 Andrew Cullen Tynan, father of the poet and writer Katharine Tynan, inherited the farm from an uncle.

== See also ==
- List of towns and villages in Ireland
- Earl of Bellomont
- Viscount Bellomont
