= River Poddle =

River in Dublin, Ireland

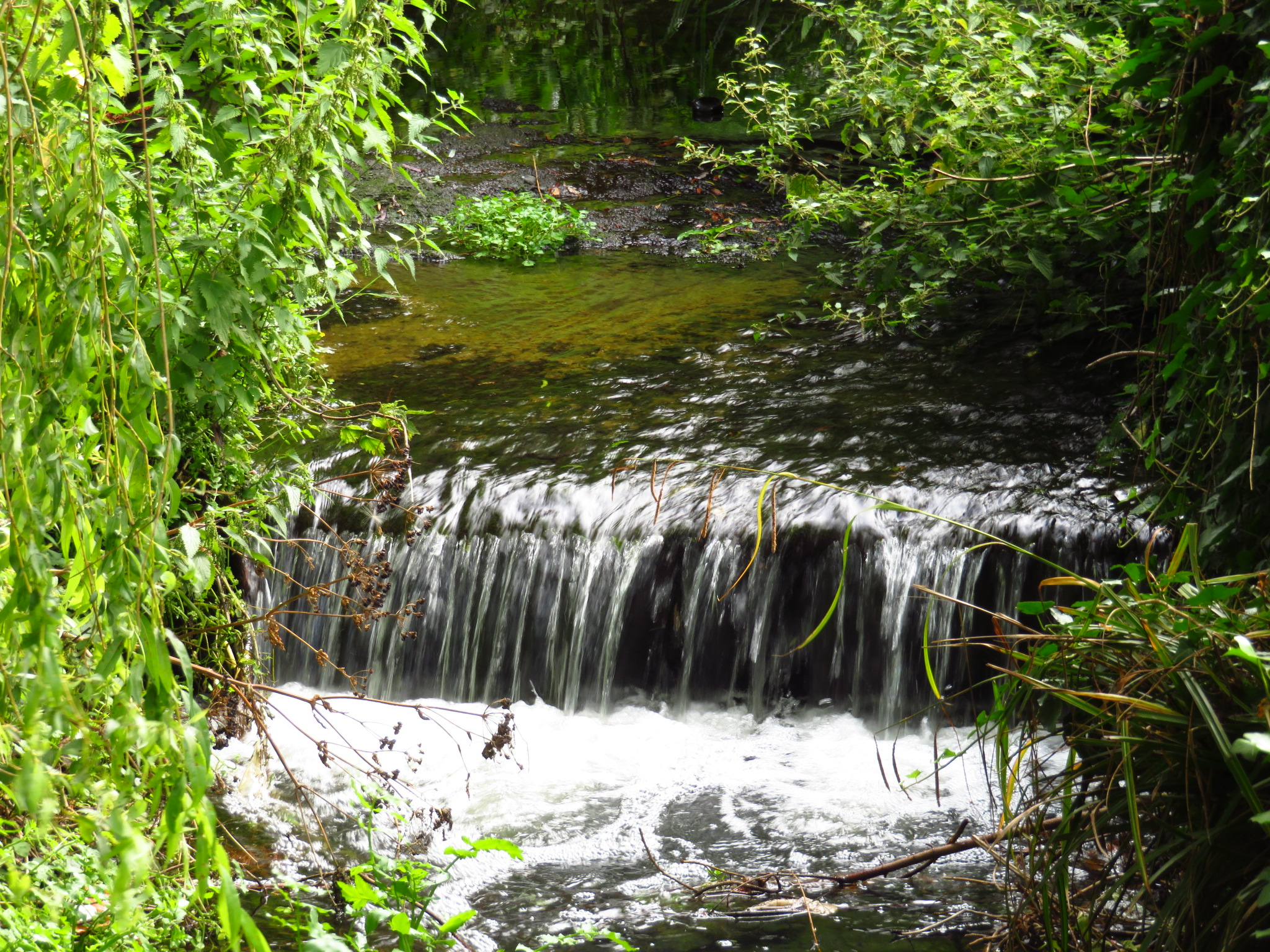
- River Poddle at Poddle Park in Kimmage

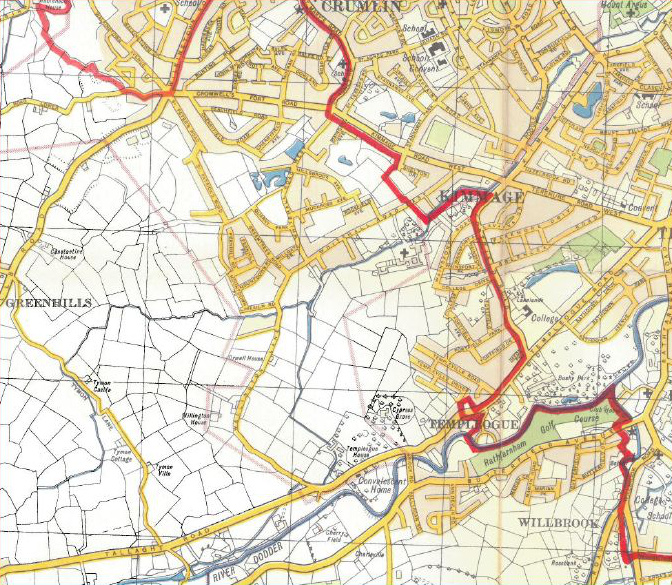
- Nickname: River Sáile
- Native name: An Poitéal (Irish)

Physical characteristics
- Source
  - location: Cookstown, near Tallaght, County Dublin
- Mouth
  - location: Discharges into River Liffey at Wellington Quay
  - coordinates: 53°20′44.5″N 06°15′56.3″W

Basin features
- River system: River Liffey
- Tributaries
  - left: Commons Water (Coombe Stream)

The River Poddle (Irish: An Poitéal) is a river in Dublin, Ireland, a pool of which (dubh linn, "black pool" or "dark pool" in Irish) gave the city its English language name. Boosted by a channel made by the Abbey of St. Thomas à Becket, taking water from the far larger River Dodder, the Poddle was the main source of drinking water for the city for more than 500 years, from the 1240s. The Poddle, which flows wholly within the traditional boundaries of County Dublin, is one of around a hundred members of the River Liffey system (excluding the Dodder tributaries), and one of over 135 watercourses in the county; it has just one significant natural tributary, the Commons Water from Crumlin.

The Poddle rises in southwest County Dublin, in the Cookstown area, northwest of Tallaght, in the administrative county of South Dublin, and flows into the River Liffey at Wellington Quay in central Dublin. Flowing in the open almost to the Grand Canal at Harold's Cross, its lower reaches, including multiple connected artificial channels, are almost entirely culverted. Aside from supplying potable water for the city from the 13th century to the 18th, to homes, and to businesses including breweries and distilleries, the river also provided wash water for skinners, tanners and dyers. Its volume was boosted by a drawing off from the much larger River Dodder, it powered multiple mills, including flour, paper and iron production facilities, from at least the 12th century until the 20th. It also provided water for the moat at Dublin Castle, through the grounds of which it still runs underground.

The Poddle has frequently caused flooding, notably around St. Patrick's Cathedral, and for some centuries, there was a commission of senior state and municipal officials to try to manage this, with the power to levy and collect a Poddle Tax. The flooding led both to the lack of a crypt at the cathedral and to the moving of the graves of satirist Dean Jonathan Swift, author of Gulliver's Travels, and his friend Stella. The river and its associated watercourses were famously polluted in certain periods, at one point allegedly sufficiently so as to kill animals drinking the water. The river is mentioned briefly in James Joyce's novel Ulysses, and multiple times in Finnegans Wake, which mentions its role in Dublin's growth.

== Names ==
=== Poddell and Salach ===
The name Poddle is first recorded in 1493, as Podell, in 1603 as Puddell. The modern spelling Poddle is first found in 1695. P.J. McCall in 1894 attempted to etymologise the name as from the term pottle, a measure of land. Carroll (1953) considers a possible derivation from the English puddle, most likely as a "translation" of the older Irish name.

An alternative Irish language name for the river, Abhainn Sáile or Salach (the "dirty river"), has also been anglicised colloquially as "the river Salach", Salagh, Glasholac, and similar. Salach (anglicised Sologh, Soulagh, Sallagh) would in this case be used in the sense of "muddy pool" – the Irish salach means "dirty, filthy" in general, but in toponyms refers to a puddle or mire.

=== Dubh Linn and Dublin ===
A large pool once existed at the confluence of the River Poddle with the Liffey, which was wider then. This water in the pool was dark, probably due to peat staining, and so it was named dubh linn in Irish, which means dark pool or black pool. This historic pool existed under the present site of the coach house and castle gardens of Dublin Castle. A settlement in the vicinity was known as Dyfflin by its Viking founders, derived from the Irish name.

=== Related names ===
The stretches of artificially made stream from Balrothery to Kimmage, and from Harold's Cross to the City Basin were both known as the City Watercourse. The offtake from the site of Donore Castle through Marrowbone Lane is known as the Tenter Water but was previously also called the Pimlico River.

== Course ==
=== Origins: Cookstown and Tallaght ===
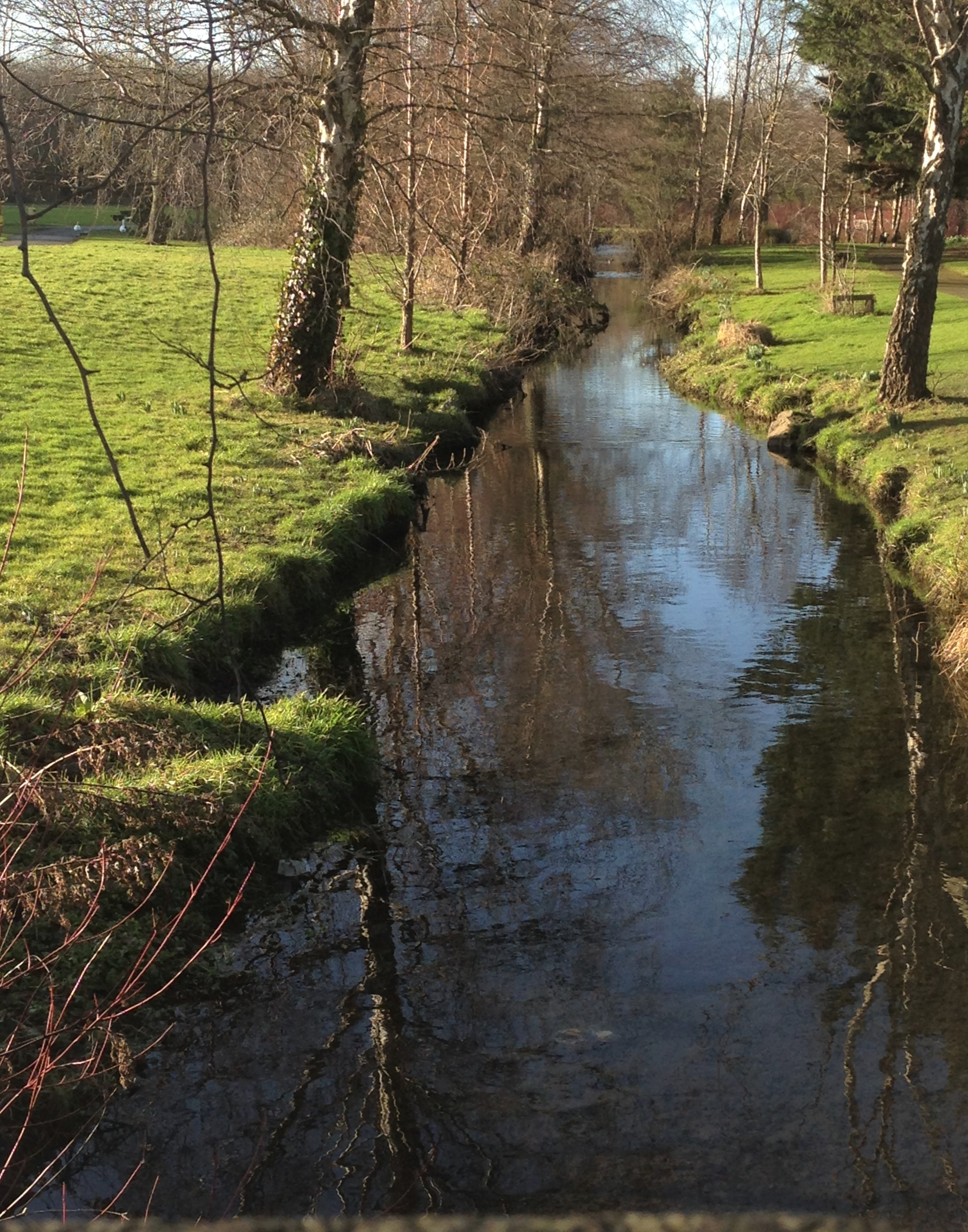
Early Poddle River (Tymon River in this part), in Tymon Park (western part)

The Poddle begins as the Tymon River in the Cookstown area of "Greater Tallaght", northwest of Tallaght village, between Tallaght Hospital and Cookstown Industrial Estate. After a largely culverted stretch, its early open course, near Old Belgard Road and the former Jacob's Biscuit factory, has been straightened where it flows in what is now an area of light industrial development. It runs to the north of the former Institute of Technology, Tallaght campus (now the Tallaght campus of the Technological University Dublin), and passes the Tallaght Athletics track before going through a small public park, Bancroft Park. It continues to the east, past where a tributary from the vicinity of Tallaght Priory used to flow in. The small river goes on through Tymon North, turning northeast and passing schools and St Aengus Church (centre of one of the four Tallaght Catholic parishes), then between a special school and Tallaght Community School, to come to Tymon Lane, formerly the only road for miles, linking Templeogue and then-remote Greenhills, when Tallaght was a small village.

=== Tymon Park and after ===
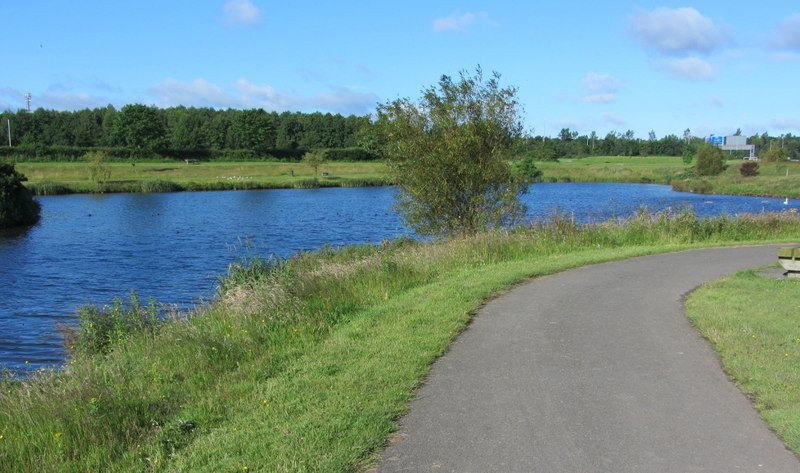
Tymon Lake on the Poddle in Tymon Park (eastern part)

The river flows north into the western division of Tymon Park, a large public park formed in the 1980s and 1990s, where it curves northwest and then east again. It runs below both the site of the ruined Tymon Castle and the site of the later house of the same name (now a County Council depot), through an area of three small ponds, and one main one, and then crosses under the M50 orbital motorway to the eastern division of the park. In this division, after passing Limekiln Rounders Club and Clondalkin Cricket Club, the Poddle runs east. Additional small ponds, and one larger one, sometimes Tymon Lake, were added to its course here. The river reaches in this eastern section are to be redesigned, and made the centrepiece of a flood capture area, during flood alleviation works, with an Integrated Constructed Wetland also to be added. It then parallels Limekiln Road before passing under Wellington Road, going east and turning northeast by Glendown Drive. In this area, it forms the northern border of Templeogue, towards Greenhills, and then the southern border of the small district of Perrystown.

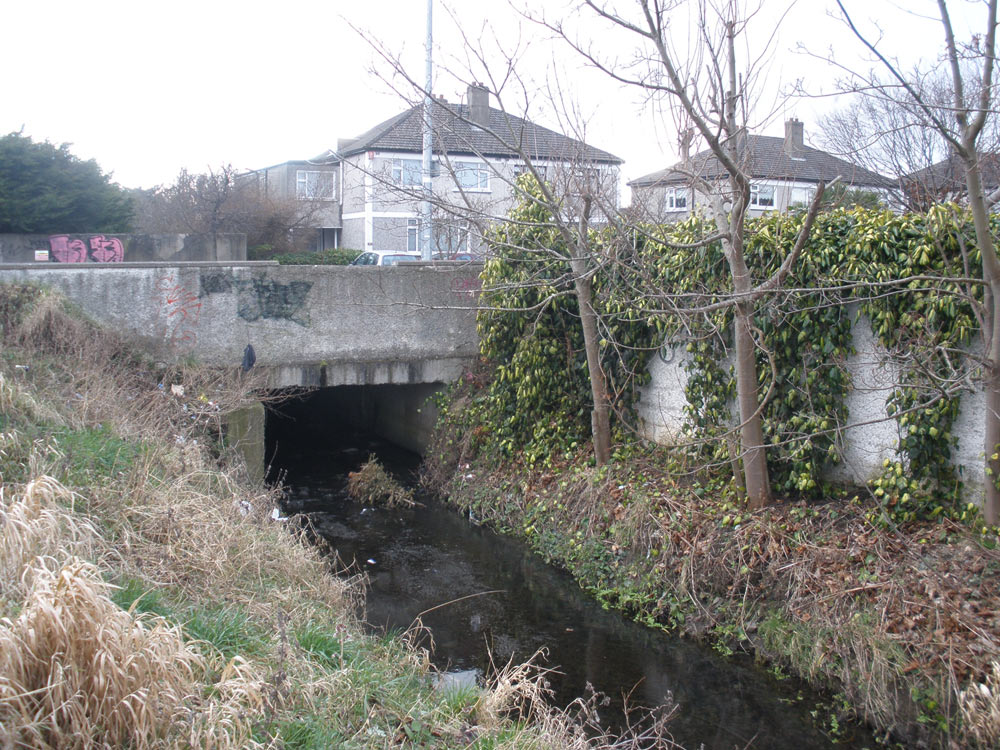
River Poddle with Templeogue to the left and Whitehall to the right

Near Templeville Road, the Poddle used to receive the artificial stream from the direction of Templeogue and Firhouse. This channel, the first stretch of City Watercourse, carried water from the River Dodder extracted at Balrothery Weir in Firhouse; as of 2020, it has been dry for at least two decades. It then passes into Kimmage via Wainsfort Manor, and by Wainsfort Manor Green there is a sluice gate to manage high flow. If the water backs up, some is diverted into what is today the Lakelands Overflow culvert. Historically a surface channel, this now runs underground to cross Wainsfort Road, runs along past the Terenure College buildings and comes out at the western end of the college's lake (the lake, in turn, has a tunnel connection to the River Dodder at Bushy Park, though the lakes in that park, formerly supplied with Poddle water, are now supplied solely from the Dodder itself).

=== The City Watercourse ===
The Poddle's modest volume was boosted for over 700 years by a significant addition of water diverted from the River Dodder at a large weir at Balrothery in Firhouse, and carried by the three-kilometre first section of the City Watercourse. The ancient artificial watercourse was made by monks not later than the 1240s, and its use later extended with the sanction of the Anglo-Norman administration in Ireland. The watercourse takes an interesting bend after it crosses under Wellington Lane, which looks like the reuse of an existing ditch around an earlier ecclesiastical site. Often roads follow the boundaries of such sites, and this would be a rare example of a watercourse doing so. Near the northern end of the artificial connection was a major milling complex, the Mount Down Mill.

=== Kimmage, Crumlin and The Tongue ===
The point in Kimmage where the City Watercourse joined the river is known exclusively as the Poddle. It continues on through the district, tending northeast, and passing through the Kimmage Manor complex, where it actually goes under one of the buildings. The river's main course through the manor complex is supplemented by a culverted channel along its edge; the flow goes through the surface channel only in normal conditions but when it rises in spate, it overflows into the culvert too. At the end of the grounds, the flows combine and exit in a culvert for some hundreds of metres.

The Poddle passes the K.C.R. (Kimmage Crossroads), and Poddle Park and Ravensdale Park, once the site of another mill complex and now a small public park. After a mix of culverted and open sections, it reaches Sundrive Road in Crumlin, where a shopping centre was built on the site of another former mill, the Larkfield complex.

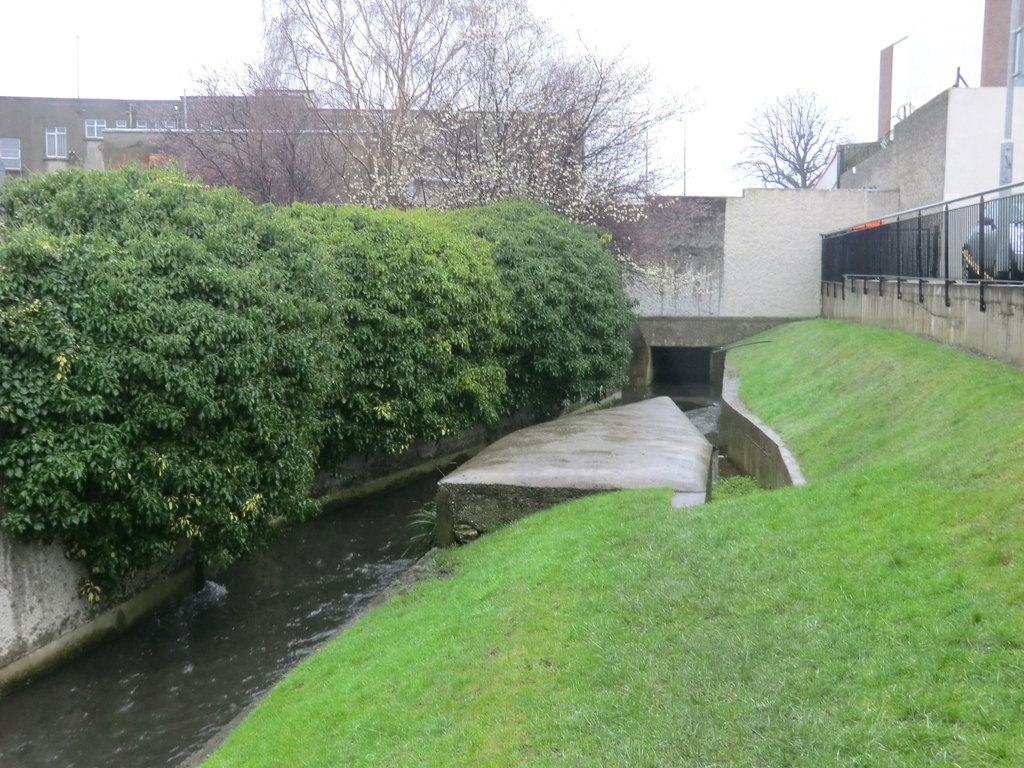
The Poddle course splits at the Stone Boat / The Tongue, since 1245

The river's line divided at the site of an ancient structure called "The Tongue", near what is now Mount Argus monastery in Harold's Cross. This is a wedge of stone, also known as the "Stone Boat", that divides the flow, in a 2:1 proportion when a certain depth of flow is reached. While the current "Stone Boat" is a modern replacement, it was formed based on the preceding structure (constructed in 1245), which lay in an open area called the Tongue-field; it is now on a suburban street. The restoration or rebuilding was done by the company, Tiernan Builders, who built the modern housing adjacent.

The lesser portion formed the second section of the man-made City Watercourse, heading north for Crumlin Road and Dolphin's Barn. Its line passes the Grand Canal east of Dolphin's Barn Bridge, where it is intercepted by the Grand Canal Tunnel Sewer, and on through the Back of the Pipes, to the "City Basin" reservoir (as established c. 1670 and rebuilt c. 1720) in Basin Street. The City Basin was said to be one of the first urban water reservoirs in modern Europe, and the City Watercourse and Basin allowed many distilleries and breweries to be set up on the western edge of the city in the 1700s, including the St James's Gate Brewery. Near the City Basin was the original starting point of the Grand Canal, and a supply of canal water eventually replaced Poddle water for some purposes, including the making of Guinness.

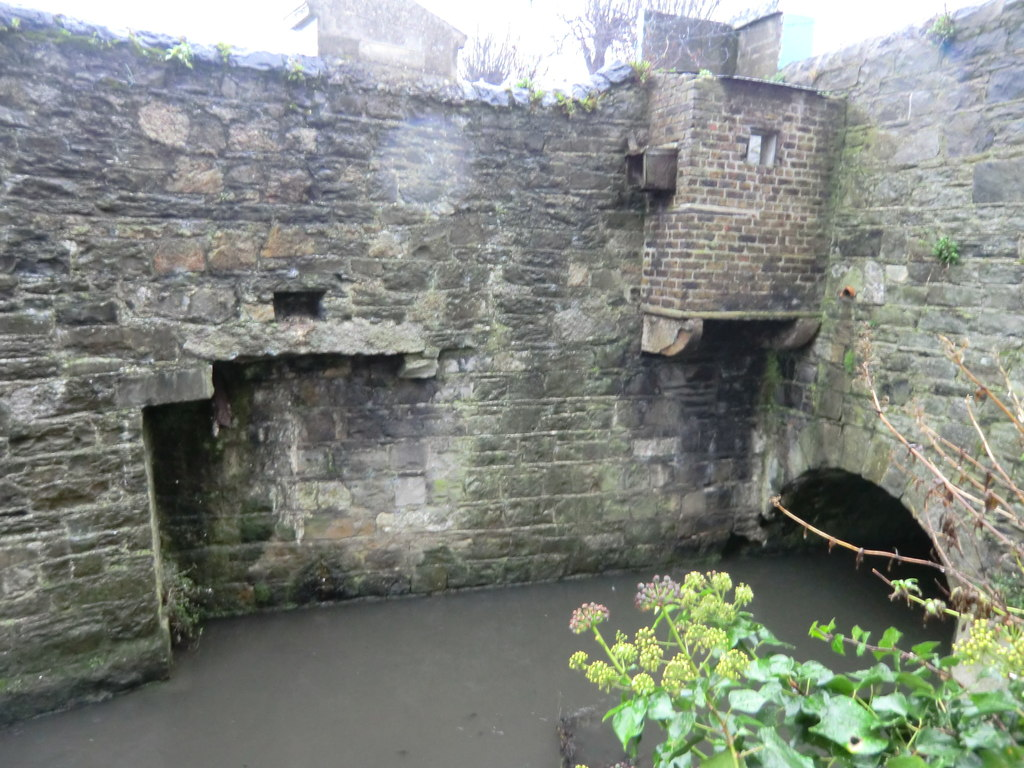
Poddle in Harold's Cross, between the Russian Orthodox complex and Mount Jerome Cemetery

The greater flow continues along a form of the original river bed. In the 1990s, changes were made in the Kimmage and Harold's Cross areas, including the formation of a decorative small pond as part of flood capture works, with a large fountain (also built by the company who made the modern Stone Boat, as of 2019 it was not in operation for some years) to the river. The main course of the Poddle passes the Russian Orthodox Church community complex and runs along the edge of Mount Jerome Cemetery (and between the main cemetery and the dedicated Muslim section). It then goes into a culvert to pass under the grounds of Harold's Cross Hospice, Greenmount Lane and Greenmount Business Park, where the river once supplied a pond and mills. It travels under the Grand Canal in a syphon, with an overflow to the Greater Dublin Drainage Scheme pipe, and enters the inner city. It was confirmed in 2020 that there is still a continuous flow through to the Liffey.

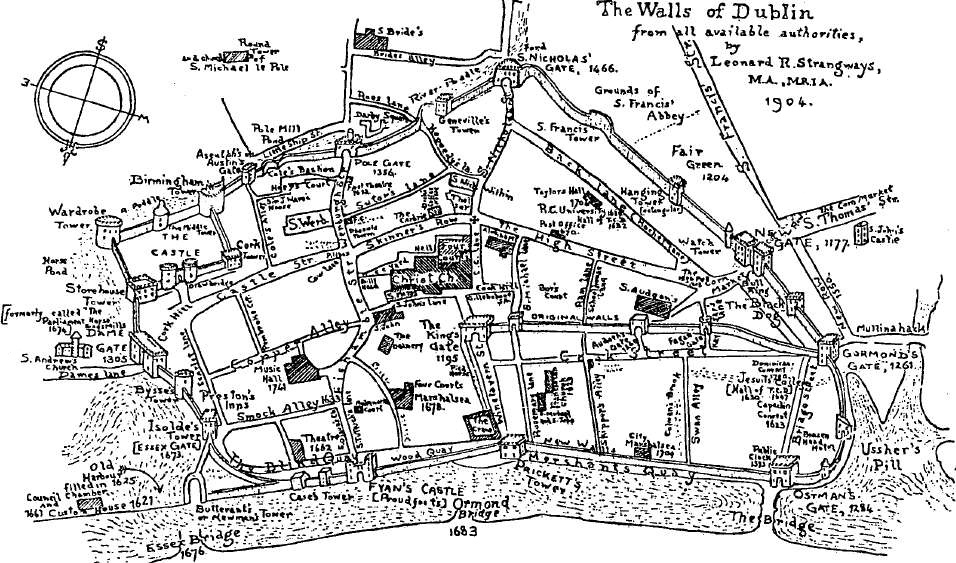
The Poddle among other details of historical central Dublin

=== Lower reaches ===
The river passes under much of the south city centre in culvert, with perhaps just one short open stretch remaining.

==== The Abbey (Mill) Stream ====
The "modern" lower main course is itself a 13th-century diversion, the Abbey Mill Stream, made for the Abbey of St Thomas a Beckett, usually known simply as St Thomas Abbey. It diverted the Poddle west, then northeast to the abbey then returned it downhill to the original course. It was later named the Earl of Meath's Watercourse as it ran through the Earl's Liberty, and was owned by him. The original Poddle course, which ran nearly directly north (west of the line of Clanbrassil Street and south to north through Blackpitts), was wholly lost. The Abbey Mill Stream line goes as far as New Row. The inner-city stages of the river's flow are complex, with related channels separating and joining.

==== The modern main course ====
Emerging from the syphon under the Grand Canal, the river continues to bend northwest, passing the grounds of the former barracks, now Griffith College and going by the National Stadium. It travels under the South Circular Road and a former large cigarette factory and comes to Donore Avenue (once called Love Lane). It then goes almost west to the Back of the Pipes area, where it passes over the Commons Water, and almost reached the City Watercourse when it was extant, before swinging east. Its course passes Cork Street and runs parallel to parts of Marrowbone Lane, where there is a major City Council depot, to the site of St Thomas Abbey, south of Thomas Street. After this it runs southeast, passing Pimlico, Ardee Street and the western end of the Coombe, again crossing the line of the Commons Water, and then turning almost 90 degrees at Warrenmount, a former convent, in the northern part of Blackpitts, where there was a large millpond and major mill, and a side millrace, and heading for its ancient course. At Fumbally Lane by Warrenmount a diversion from the City Watercourse, the Tenter Water, joined, with a small tributary. The Tenter Water is so-called after the Tenter Fields, an area between Greenville Avenue and the modern Oscar Square once used for stretching and drying fabrics, and later laid out for market gardens. There was a fall of about 8 metres in a short span within the Liberties, which allowed the Poddle to power multiple mills and factories. Previously there were two short open stretches between canal and Patrick Street, but as of 2018, only one remained.

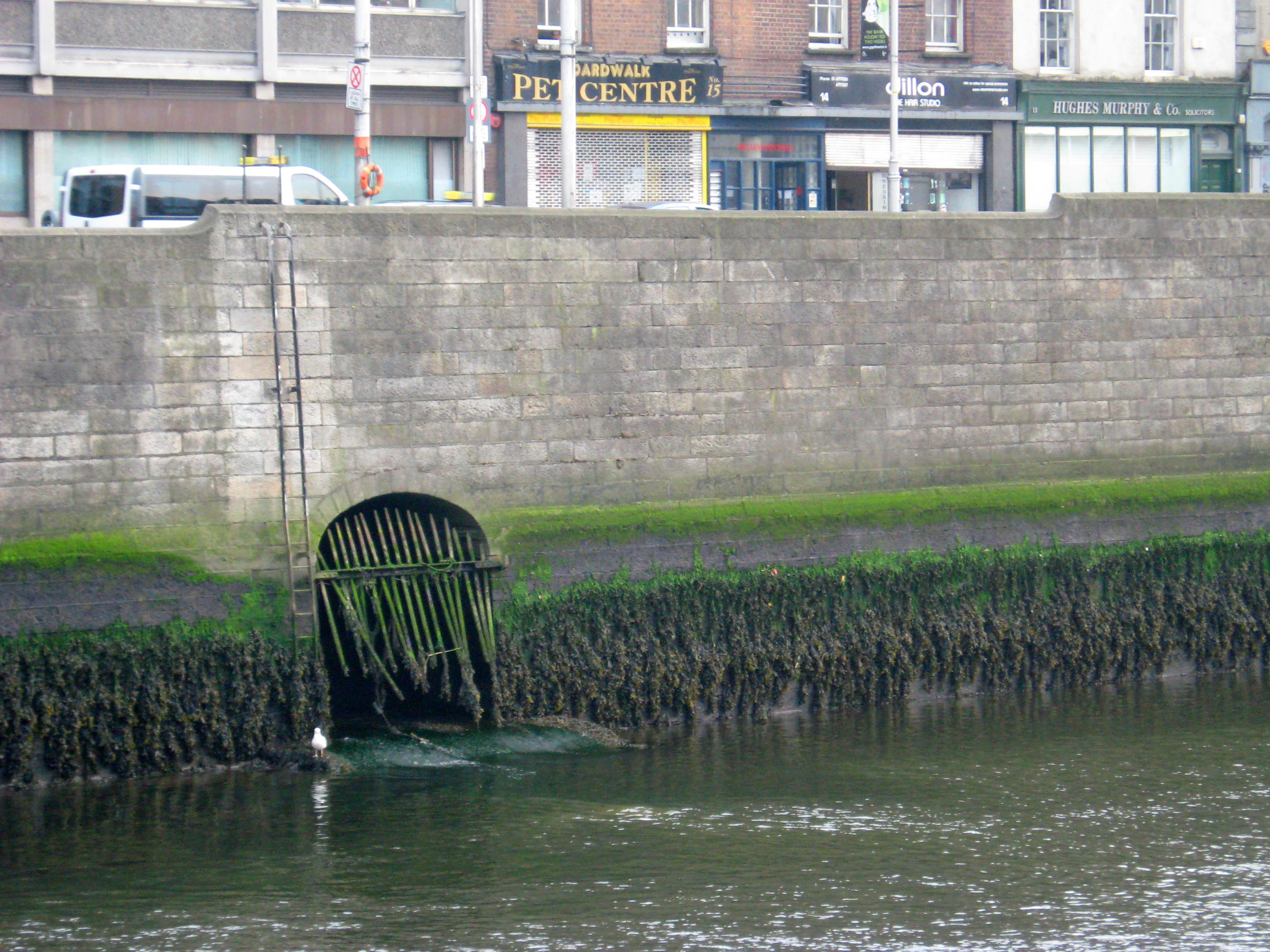
Confluence of the River Poddle and River Liffey, at Wellington Quay, at low tide

The Poddle is further joined at the intersection of the Coombe and Patrick Street by the Commons Water from along the Coombe street, and ultimately rising in Crumlin. A short street section, now Dean Street, was once named Cross-Poddle. From New Row, the river's ancient course more or less resumed, subject to some straightening. Nowadays, much of the lowest course of the Poddle is in a large brick tunnel under the city streets and Dublin Castle, and while access is restricted, it is of walkable scale and at least two writers on the river have been given tours of part of the route. This section is found from Patrick Street, where the river ran in two streams, overground for centuries, and then underground until the 1920s, when a single brick-lined culvert was constructed under the eastern side of the street.

Having passed through a chamber (7 metres by 3 metres), the Poddle enters Dublin Castle under the Ship Street Gate, runs to the Chapel Royal, and then is turned sharply towards the Liffey; it is in this area that the Black Pool once existed. The Poddle leaves the castle complex by the Palace Street Gate, with a bigger branch line splitting off towards City Hall (formerly the site of the Nunnery of St Mary Le Dam), turning to run parallel under Dame Street, and later angling east. The more direct line continues almost directly towards the Liffey, passing under the Olympia Theatre (formerly a music hall). Beyond the theatre, near the Project Arts Centre, the two branches re-combine and proceed almost directly north, under offices and the quay road. The river's tunnel passes multiple sewers in this area; none normally outfall into it but there are some storm overflows.

The confluence of the Poddle and the Liffey is visible at lower tides as a grated opening in the Liffey's stone walls at Wellington Quay.

== Roles in Dublin ==
=== 12th-13th century situation ===
The Poddle was used as the boundary between two major land grants by King John as Lord of Ireland, one to the first Anglo-Norman Bishop of Dublin, John Comyn, from east of its original course as far south as Harold's Cross, and the other to the Abbey of St Thomas à Becket, west from the Poddle and as far south as Kimmage. The abbey also held lands further south in the County of Dublin, including a weir on the River Dodder at Balrothery near Firhouse. The abbey is believed to have built the Abbey Mill Stream diversion in that period, changing the flow's direction at a location around the present-day gates of Mount Jerome Cemetery, so as to supply the monastery. However, the supply (especially the persistent dry weather flow) from the then 13 square kilometres flat catchment area was limited and had to supply tenants of both abbey and cathedral, so in the early thirteenth century, they developed a scheme to take water from the Dodder at their weir, by the 3 km Firhouse-Kimmage City Watercourse channel, boosting the Poddle's flow considerably (it constituted the majority of the flow for much of the year).

The river was described as flowing underneath St. Sepulchre's Palace where it was supplying water to a 12th-century well said to have a depth of more than 18 metres ("60 feet").

=== Municipal water supply ===
==== Development ====
The river provided an early source of clean and drinkable water for the city, as the Liffey was tidal within the city area, and undrinkable, and the other major south-side watercourse, the Camac, was too far from the main settlement (although there may have been a channel, sometimes called the Camac Millrace, diverting some flow from it), while the Steyne River was too small. By the 13th century, the water supply was inadequate and the residents of Dublin allocated a budget to secure more supply and applied to the royal officers. On 29 April 1244, the leading official in Ireland, the Justiciar, Maurice Fitzgerald, directed the Sheriff of Dublin to appoint a panel of municipal freemen to find a suitable source of water and a way to bring it to Dublin. This writ was backed by a threat of arrest for anyone obstructing the project. Following the civic inquisition, as it was called, a deal was made, in 1244–1245, with the Abbey of St Thomas, to use their Dodder-boosted Poddle supply for broader city purposes. Near the point where the abbey had diverted the Poddle, but a little further south, the flow was divided, and a new, city-owned channel, the City Watercourse, was formed, carrying the water towards the James' Street area, where a storage basin was built. Initially, the water was distributed by way of surface channels in Thomas Street and High Street, with a fountain added in Cornmarket in 1308; the supply to Dublin Castle may have been already then, and certainly was later, carried by lead piping. The basin was renewed around 1670, and pipes of lead, and later also timber, were laid into the city. A more modern and larger reservoir (9.5 million-gallon capacity, three months' supply at that time), also built at a higher elevation, increasing the pressure in the pipes, was built as the final form of the City Basin in 1721, as the population had risen from 60,000 in the 1680s to around 120,000. The resulting flow of water supplied what was called the Pipe Water Establishment, a special division of Dublin Corporation, for centuries.

==== Maintenance and problems ====
Different persons were over time entrusted with the task of overseeing the water flow towards Dublin, such as one John Pylle of Templeogue in 1456, and a Walsh in 1491. The Tongue or Stone Boat, dividing the flow 2:1, was agreed to be maintained, and the city was to pay for any related works required on the monastic weir on the Dodder. St Thomas's Abbey was to receive one mark for the agreement, and an annual rental of five marks, though records show that payments were delayed or not made on occasion. Further, the officials of the city were allowed to gather citizens, and tenants of the religious settlements, to repair the weir, channels and dividing structure, and it is recorded that the Tongue was rebuilt in 1555.

There were also deliberate acts of interference with the water supply. In 1534, rebels following Silken Thomas broke the supply lines in an attempt to help his cause, and in 1597 the Talbots of Templeogue blocked the flow in a dispute with mill-owners using its power, an act repeated by Royalist forces during the English Civil War to leave the Cromwellian forces occupying Dublin short of both water and milling capacity for food production. Reputedly a later landowner in Templeogue, Sir Compton Domville, threatened to do the same if a nephew convicted of murder was executed; the threat was not tested, as the aristocrat in question, Lord Henry Barry, had his sentence commuted to banishment. There were also issues with mill operators and landowners near the watercourses taking more water than they were entitled to, some even constructing impromptu sluices by cutting openings in the banks, temporarily closed with earth but easily opened for irrigation purposes.

Legislation to manage the Poddle supply included rules forbidding dumping into the watercourses, or washing clothes in them, and grazing of animals alongside, for the latter of which a fine per animal per day could be levied. Following the first known reports of what would nowadays be called industrial pollution, in 1718, an investigation traced the source to a paper mill and a tuck mill, and an initially successful legal defence by the millers led to the passage of An Act for cleaning and repairing the watercourse from the River Dodder to the City of Dublin, and to prevent the diverting and corrupting the Water therein, which gave Dublin Corporation much greater authority over the Poddle and City Watercourse, and banned tuck and woollen mills from the system.

==== Succession and replacement ====
The Abbey of St Thomas was suppressed in 1538, and its rights passed to the Brabazon family, later Earls of Meath. The Brabazons had their own reservoir, the Liberty Basin, built in 1820 at Pim Street; it was built over in Victorian times. The Meath rights over the "main Poddle" line, renamed from the Abbey Mill Stream to the Earl of Meath's Watercourse, and water supply in the Liberties of Dublin, were bought out by Dublin Corporation in 1864, for 6,400 pounds.

As the city grew, supplies were insufficient to allow constant flow to all properties, and it had to be rationed, with special city employees called turncocks engaged to open and close valves to different streets in turn, ringing handbells to advise residents when this was occurring. The city water started to be sourced in other ways from 1745, when an early Waterworks Engineer, James Scanlon, set up a water wheel to draw from the Liffey above the tidal reaches, at Islandbridge, to supply northern Dublin. In 1775, water was diverted from the Grand Canal to supply the city, and in 1790, the Royal Canal was drawn into municipal supply for northern Dublin, in place of the Islandbridge supply.

==== Pollution and the end of the Dodder link ====
Even when no potable water was required from the Poddle, the city authorities were obliged to maintain a certain flow in the river for the benefit of industrial users such as mills and breweries, and a last modernisation of the Balrothery weir and sluice arrangements was made in the early 19th century. With no need to worry about contamination of drinking water, pollution increased notably, and Whitelaw and Walsh commented that the Poddle "formed an immense sewer ... putrefying the streets under which it passes..." while William Handcock said that it was "so polluted by paper-making that it has become poisonous, and cattle and horses have died from drinking it." On at least one occasion the millers on the Liberties street known as Pimlico did seek permission to clean the river at their own expense.

The Dodder-Poddle connection was disturbed by housing developments from the 1970s, and was allowed to dry out in the late 20th century; only a tiny part still carries water, though ample evidence of the watercourse can be seen: the sluices and channel on the north side of the Great Weir still stand. There was discussion about a partial restoration for historical interest but this has not, as of 2020, progressed.

=== Industry ===
The river supplied water for multiple industries, including brewing and distilling, as well as skinners, tanners and dyers, and powered multiple mills. At least one mill seems may have pre-dated the Anglo-Norman invasion, as it is referenced in an early assignment of lands by King John. By around 1300, there already appear to already have been at least six mills: a pair of King's Mills and a pair named after a Doubleday, all between the castle and the Liffey, along with the Pool (later Pole) Mill by Dublin Castle, and the Schyeclappe Mill (for a long time the property of the Guild of Tailors) in what would become the Liberties. Later mills existed on all of the Dodder-Poddle City Watercourse, the Poddle proper, the inner City Watercourse, and possibly on other city-centre branch lines. On Mallet's list of mills, 12 are described as being within the Poddle system, while William Smith's list of 1879 has 40.

Mills and industrial facilities supported by the City Watercourses and Poddle included:

- (on the first run of City Watercourse) the Bella Vista mill (Delaford paper mills), for a time Ireland's largest paper mill by volume and a flour mill at Templeogue and Mount Down Mill, which was a tuck mill, woollen mill, flour mill and eventually sawmill and hydroelectric generation point,
- (on the Poddle proper as far as The Tongue) a cutler's mill (water also being abstracted for Terenure House and its estate), two flour mills in Kimmage, one with its own millpond, and another flour mill in Crumlin (where the Sundrive Road shopping centre now stands),
- (on the inner City Watercourse) two iron mills, one of which later milled flour,
- (on the Poddle proper in Harold's Cross) a paper and wire mill later converted for flour production, a flour mill opposite Mount Jerome cemetery, a large cotton mill complex at Greenmount (employing 600 at its closure), and a "skin mill" (possibly for cleaning rabbit skins),
- (within the canals) the Marrowbone Lane Distillery on the Tenter Water channel, an iron foundry, a calico print works, and, at the rejoining of the Tenter Water with the Poddle, Busby's Flour (and also Oat and Oil) Mill (at Warrenmount),
- (in and near the Liberties) at least six tanneries, a glue factory, a wood-turning factory, a Jameson distillery, Caffrey's Brewery and two others, a bacon factory and at least three malthouses.

=== Defence and escape ===
The Poddle, and initially Dubh Linn too, naturally provided a water defence for the south and east faces of Dublin Castle, though its flow was not substantial enough to create a significant barrier, and a dam was built near the river's exit from the castle (giving the name to Dame Street), to provide a greater depth of water. A ditch was dug along the northern and western faces of the castle, and took some water from the Poddle, though the overall moat was at one time described as "partly wet and partly dry". The old town walls met with those of the castle at the Poddle, and a double arch was found in the northern part of the castle in modern times (the part where the moat passed under the town wall appears to have been filled in c. 1400).

In 1592, Red Hugh O'Donnell and Art O'Neill escaped from Dublin Castle through a garderobe drain down into the Poddle, then proceeding out into the Liffey and on to the Dublin Mountains. This escape, O'Donnell's second, is commemorated by an annual trek from central Dublin into the mountains since five people began it in 1954; as of 2017, 200 hikers are chosen from 800 or more applicants each year.

== Flooding ==
=== St Patrick's Cathedral and the Liberties ===
The Poddle once flowed near what became St Patrick's Street in two streams, and the original St Patrick's Church was built between them and is recorded as Ecclesia S. Patricii in Insula (the Church of St Patrick on the Island). The church was elevated to collegiate status by John Comyn in 1191 and the early building of wood was remade in "hewn stone" and dedicated to "God, our Blessed Lady Mary and St Patrick" on 17 March of that year. The next prelate, Henri de Loundres, elevated it as St Patrick's Cathedral in 1213, which left Dublin as a rare city with two cathedrals. Historians have debated the choice of site, on marshy ground between two streams, and Bernard proposed that it could only be because of some holy association of the location, most probably with St Patrick. For centuries the Poddle, even as it was progressively culverted, caused regular flooding and dampness in the cathedral, as well as many other buildings in the Blackpitts and St Patrick's Street areas. On one occasion it is described as flooding the cathedral to a depth of 5 feet, and on another to overtopping the prayer desks. An enquiry into obstructions of the water near the cathedral was held in 1437, while in 1493 and 1664 Parliament directed that locals must keep the drains clear, but still in 1701 flooding was so severe that people could boat past the cathedral, and in 1744 services had to be moved to Christ Church Cathedral. Major flooding is also noted in 1778, 1791, 1795, and on through the 19th century. In the early 19th century two historians commented that even largely culverted the Poddle could still pose a hazard: "It occasionally, however, bursts from its caverns and inundates the vicinity ... particularly Patrick Street, Ship Street and the Castle Yard, and Dame Street, where it is sometimes necessary to use a boat." During the major reconstruction of the cathedral in the nineteenth century, the graves of Dean Jonathan Swift and Stella were moved to their present location, due to the problem of the Poddle. Even in the early 20th century, the Dean noted that the water level was only 7.5 feet below the floor. By this time the Poddle Water, as it was labelled, was fully underground in the area, coming from New Street via Freestone Alley, with one channel passing in culvert right outside the main door of the cathedral, the other under the front edge of the buildings across St Patrick's Street.

=== The Poddell (Poddle) Commission ===
A statutory body, the Poddell Commission, was formed by an Act in the times of Charles II to manage city centre flooding from the river, especially if it might affect St Patrick's Cathedral. It had a small staff, and the powers to take emergency action, and to assess and collect a special tax to support its work. As of 1835, the commission's membership included many of the most senior officials of both Dublin and Ireland, including both the Lord Mayor and the Recorder of Dublin, the Church of Ireland Archbishop of Dublin, the Deans of both St Patrick's and Christ Church Cathedrals, the Lord Chief Justice, the Chief Justice of Common Pleas, the Principal Secretary of State for Ireland, the Attorney and Solicitor-General, and the Earl of Meath, along with later-added diocesan officials, the Chancellor of St Patrick's Cathedral and the Lord of the Manors of St Thomas Court and Donore, while the Secretary of State was replaced by the Keeper of the Privy Seal.

The Poddell Tax could be collected from the officers of St Patrick's Cathedral and residents of the cathedral close (later stated as the Liberty of St Sepulchre) and St Patrick Street, but also from residents of two full liberties, and even more broadly, from all living within the danger of flooding, and initially, it was limited overall only to "such tax ... as should be sufficient" but to 5 pounds per person. The geographic reach of the tax was later extended to Dublin Castle and the residents or businesses on both sides of any street on or with a drain linked to the Poddle, and capped at 1s in the pound of rateable valuation of the property, and at 3 pounds per house.

The commission had as its chief employee an inspector at a salary of 10 pounds, who by 1836 also held the office of collector of taxes at a commission of 7.5%, and a non-statutory role of superintendent at a further salary of 25 pounds. The Registrar of the Diocese of Dublin acted as an unofficial secretary to the commission, for occasional substantial payments, while there was also a surveyor, and one of the commissioners acted as honorary treasurer.

By 1836 the commission, being composed mostly of senior officials with many responsibilities, rarely held a quorate meeting (none had been convened successfully since 1830, at least). The Poddell Tax was either 6 pence or 1 shilling in the pound on 2,632 buildings, with 20 pounds required from St Patrick's Cathedral and 280 from Dublin Castle. At the request of four of the Poddle Commissioners, the Lord Lieutenant asked Dublin's Commissioners of Paving to consider taking on the role and powers of the Poddle Commission, and they accepted this task, proposing to discontinue the special tax except with regard to cathedral and castle. The transfer of powers was done in 1840 and the powers were later in turn transferred to Dublin Corporation.

=== Suburban ===
There have been issues with suburban flooding in more recent times, with serious floods in Harold's Cross and Kimmage in 1987, 1990, 1993 and 2011. Following the 2011 flooding the local authorities asked the Office of Public Works to prioritise study of the Poddle, and a Catchment-Based Flood Risk Assessment and Management Study was carried out by 2013, with three flood management proposals prepared as a result.

=== Flood risk alleviation plans ===
Following public consultation in 2014, design work was due, as of 2016, on a plan focused on excess water storage options, primarily at Tymon Park, and the use of flood walls.

In 2020 there were public meetings about the resulting Flood Alleviation Scheme, a planning application was submitted to An Bord Pleanala by the two local authorities together, and a further submission prepared in response to a request for further information by An Bord. The final flood alleviation scheme has as main features: design to manage a 100-year flood, with 40–60% culvert obstruction, embanking in both divisions of Tymon Park, including a flood interception area in the eastern division, and a flow control device at the outlet from Tymon Lake, formation of an Integrated Constructed Wetland near Tymon Lake, flood wall construction in multiple locations, water capture engineering in one park in the Kimmage area near Crumlin, channel realignment in Whitehall Park, manhole upgrading and potentially sealing in multiple locations, including near South Circular Road and within Temple Bar.

== Nature ==
The river rises at an altitude of c. 92m, passes through Tymon Park at around 60m, and runs steadily downhill to sea level before the Grand Canal, after which it flows on to the Liffey at that level. Despite its historical importance, it is not one of the larger volume tributaries of the Liffey, which has over 100 watercourses in its system, excluding the tributaries of the Dodder, but it is one of the best-known of the more than 135 rivers and streams within the historic County Dublin.

The majority of the Poddle's flow comes from storm and surface water drainage. Historically, in addition to the partial capture of the Dodder flow, there was potential for snowmelt or storm "bursts" in the Dodder feed, but this possibility is now cut off. The river's catchment area is around 16.4 square kilometres, most of which is urbanised. The bedrock over most of the Poddle's catchment is a mix of limestone and shale, with some aquifer capacity, covered by limestone-derived till and gravel, and then by various gravels, alluvium and human-activity-derived soils.

The river, due to limited flow, long-term issues with pollution, and barriers at the Liffey end, and the syphon under the Grand Canal, has no significant persistent fish population, and also lacked sensitive invertebrate species. Specifically, there are no salmon-like species, and no other fish of fisheries interest and none are likely to gain access moving upstream from the Liffey. Limited inputs suggest that the water is often of poor quality, including suffering from some elevated nutrient levels.

The Poddle has been described as artificial since medieval times, though this is primarily related to the boosting of the supply with the feed from the Dodder. However, in modern terms the river is considered a "highly-modified urban watercourse", with at least the following features having been artificially made, in addition to the culverting in the uppermost parts of the course:

- the ponds in both divisions of Tymon Park, including Tymon Lake,
- the Lakelands weir, and Lakelands Overflow tunnel from Kimmage to Terenure College's lake,
- the culvert and former mill works between Wainsfort Manor and Fortfield Avenue,
- the "canalised" course of the river through Ravensdale Park – the course in this area was moved, and once included a mill and the culverted channel at the former Larkfield Mill,
- the Stone Boat, and all of the City Watercourse and related structures,
- and the whole course from around Mount Jerome Cemetery entrance to the Liffey, including linked channels,
- the late 20th-century syphon and overflow structure at the Grand Canal.

== Oversight ==
The Poddle flows within the jurisdictions of South Dublin County Council and Dublin City Council, and the Office of Public Works provides advice and support on flooding concerns. The river has no fixed flow or depth gauges, and has not been monitored since 2007, including for water quality, by the Environmental Protection Agency.

== Popular culture ==
A variation of one of the Poddle's names, "The River Saile", is used in the old children's song Weela Weela Walya, famously performed by The Dubliners.

The Poddle is also referenced briefly in James Joyce's Ulysses, and makes multiple appearances in his Finnegans Wake, which touches on its role in the city's water supply.

== See also ==
- Rivers of Ireland
- List of rivers of County Dublin

== Sources ==
- Doyle, Joseph W. (2012) [2008]. Ten Dozen Waters: The Rivers and Streams of County Dublin (5th ed.). Dublin, Ireland: Rath Eanna Research. pp. i–iv, 1–50 + photos and map. ISBN 978-0-9566363-4-8.
- Sweeney, Clair L. (1991). The Rivers of Dublin. Dublin, Ireland: Dublin Corporation. pp. 1–115, inc. many maps. ISBN 0-9505301-4-X.
