= Tymon Park =

Public park in suburban Dublin, Ireland

- Páirc Thigh Motháin
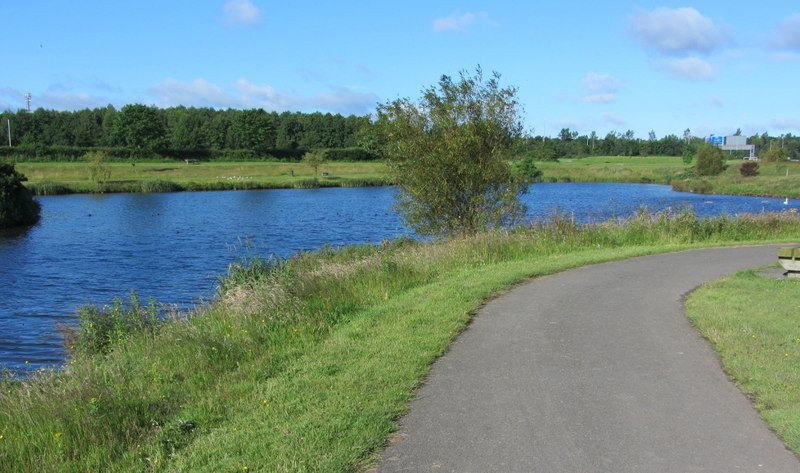
- Lake on the River Poddle, in Tymon Park

- Location within Dublin Location within Ireland
- Type: Suburban public park
- Location: South Dublin, Ireland
- Coordinates: 53°18′0″N 6°20′29″W
- Area: 130 hectares (320 acres)
- Operator: South Dublin County Council

Tymon Park (Irish: Páirc Thigh Motháin) is a large suburban public park in Dublin, Ireland. It has an area of over 300 acres (120 ha) and is divided in two by the M50 motorway, the two divisions being linked by a pair of pedestrian bridges. One of Dublin's historically important rivers, the River Poddle passes through it, providing water to a number of ponds.

== Location ==
The park is situated between Tallaght, Templeogue and Walkinstown. It straddles the M50 motorway which divides the park in two. A pedestrian footbridge links the eastern and western sides near Greenhills Road, with another further south near Templeogue Road. There are four main entrances which provide access to car parks at Tymon North Road, Greenhills Road, Limekiln Road and Willington Lane. In addition, pedestrians can gain access through a number of smaller gates.

== Amenities and activities ==
The River Poddle flows through the park, filling two bigger lakes and several interconnecting smaller ponds or water features. Four stands of mixed deciduous woodland have been established, the predominant tree species being beech, poplar, ash, horse chestnut, willow, maples, sycamore and birch, with alder, hazel, and hawthorn near the edges. The water bodies attract waterfowl, and other habitats include waterside, hedgerow, grassland and wasteland.

There is a children's adventure playground at the western end of the park, close to the Greenhills Road entrance. A new playground has been constructed close to the South Dublin County Council (SDCC) depot beside Castletymon Road. Other playgrounds are located beside the Willington Lane car park and at the Limekiln Road car park.

Tymon Park is commonly used for walking, jogging and field sports. The National Basketball Arena is located in the park, and there are 29 pitches for soccer, gaelic football, hurling, etc. There are also a number of waymarked woodland trails with interpretations of woodland features provided.

A 5 km Parkrun takes place in Tymon Park each Saturday morning. As of 29 March 2020, when the event was suspended due to the COVID-19 pandemic, there had been 298 runs with an average of 133.5 runners per week.
