= Barry Quinn =

Irish footballer (born 1979)

Personal information
- Full name: Barry Scott Quinn
- Date of birth: 9 May 1979 (age 47)
- Place of birth: Dublin, Ireland
- Position: Defender

Youth career
- Manortown United
- 1996–1998: Coventry City

Senior career*
Years	Team	Apps	(Gls)
1998–2004	Coventry City	83	(0)
2004	→ Rushden & Diamonds (loan)	4	(0)
2004	→ Oxford United (loan)	6	(0)
2004–2009	Oxford United	193	(6)
2009–2012	Brackley Town		

International career
- Republic of Ireland U18
2000	Republic of Ireland	4	(0)
- * Club domestic league appearances and goals

Barry Scott Quinn (born 9 May 1979) is an Irish retired footballer who played as a defender.

== Career ==
Quinn was signed by Coventry City in August 1996 as a trainee from Manortown United. He went on to appear seventy-four times for the club. In the 2004 January transfer window, he was loaned out to Rushden & Diamonds, who at the time were playing in League One. After appearing four times for Rushden, Quinn returned to Coventry, where he was released. He won four caps at international level for the Republic of Ireland.

He signed for Oxford United in May 2004 on a free transfer. In 2006–07 season he won the Player's Player of the Year award after a highly consistent year. Shortly after receiving the reward, manager Jim Smith informed Oxford United fans that Barry was to take the captain's armband for the following season. On 30 April 2009, after 199 appearances in his 2 spells at Oxford United, the club announced that Quinn had been released and would not be offered a new deal.

In July 2010 he moved to Brackley Town.

Quinn played for the Republic of Ireland national under-19 football team in the 1997 UEFA European Under-18 Football Championship finals in Iceland.
