= Manortown United F.C. =

Manortown United
- Full name: Manortown United Football Club
- Nicknames: Town, United
- Founded: 1969
- Ground: Greentrees Park, Perrystown, Dublin 12
- Chairman: Joey Palmer
- League: Leinster Senior League
- Website: manortownunitedfc.com
Home colours	Away colours

Manortown United F.C. is a football club based in Perrystown, Dublin, Ireland. The club has senior teams competing in the Leinster Senior League and Ireland's cup competitions including the FAI Cup and the FAI Junior Cup. The youth set-up has been very successful through the years and has provided international players at most levels, the most famous of these former players include Niall Quinn, who at the time of his retirement was the country's all-time scorer with 21 goals and Barry Quinn, who captained Ireland to victory in the U18 European Championship in 1998. The schoolboy section develops players from the age of 6 up to 18 years old, and enters several teams per age group in various football competitions such as the Dublin and District Schoolboys League (DDSL) and other relevant cups.

== History ==
The origins of Manortown United FC trace back to 1967 when a group of residents, including Arthur Worrell, Jim Smith, Jim Dunne and Paddy O'Sullivan, came together to organise a series of local league games. These matches were played on the greens of Mountdown Park and Hillsbrook Crescent in the summer of 1967. In 1969, a larger committee met with the intention of entering a team from Perrystown and Manor Estate into the schoolboy football leagues.

== Home ground ==
The club plays their home matches in Greentrees Park. The nickname for the ground is 'The 8 Acres' due to the size of the surrounding area. Another pitch is found on the '5 Acres' ground located across the road. The Club have recently received a government grant to extend the clubhouse to be shared with Robert Emmets GAC

== Club identity ==
Manortown's home shirt is yellow with royal blue trim, royal blue shorts and white socks adopted in 1969. Recently however blue and yellow socks have also been used. The current away kit is blue with a white trim, white shorts and yellow socks. The crest features a Church and a Tree representing Perrystown and Manor Estate, two areas which give their name to the club. It was designed by a former player as part of a club-wide competition.

== Rivalries ==
Manortown's traditional local rivals would be Greenhills, St.John Bosco, Templeogue United, Lourdes Celtic, Drimnagh Celtic and Crumlin United due to the close proximity of these clubs.

== Close season events ==
Manortown run each summer, one of the biggest children's mini-leagues in Dublin, with over 250 children from all areas and clubs taking part. The Manortown Mini-Leagues are strongly rooted in the community and surrounding areas and are recognised as being one of the best run and organised of such tournaments for the past 25 years.

The club also host a senior seven-a-side tournament. It regularly attracts crowds of up to 300 and features over thirty teams from all over Dublin.

== RTÉ 'Use It or Lose It' ==
The club was featured in the first episode of an RTÉ television program called Use It or Lose It. In the program former player Niall Quinn returned to Manortown United a team he last played for 25 years ago. He joined his former team-mates as they tried to regain their fitness for one last match.

== Honours ==
- (Northern Ireland) Dunluce Trophy
  - 1999
  - Maher Cup 2013
