= Kimmage =

Suburb of Dublin, Ireland

Kimmage Camaigh (Irish)
- Suburb
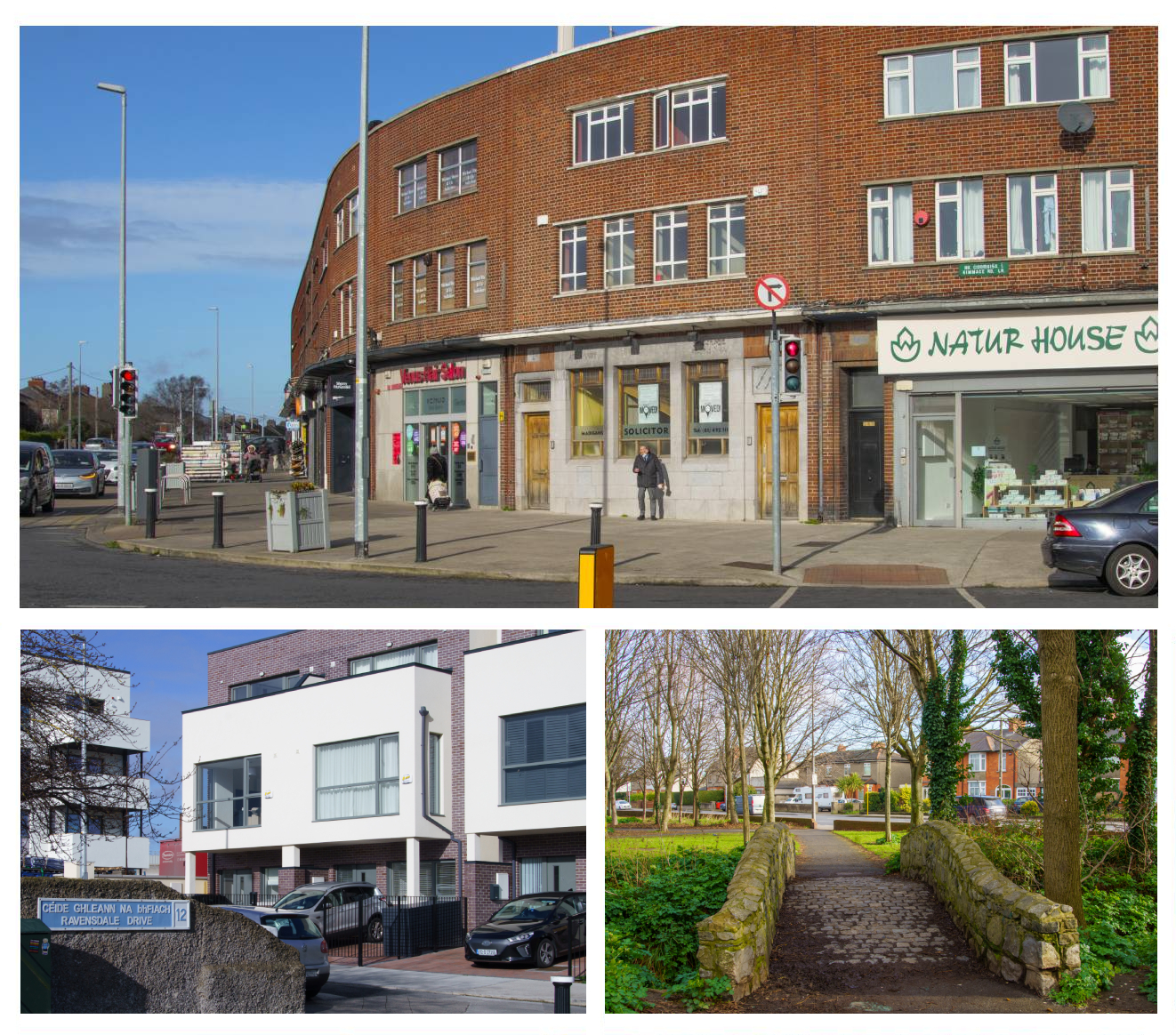
- Clockwise from top: businesses in Kimmage's D6W area; a bridge in Poddle Park; a Ravensdale Drive sign in Kimmage's D12 area

- Location in Dublin Kimmage (Dublin)
- Coordinates: 53°19′00″N 6°17′20″W
- Country: Ireland
- Province: Leinster
- City area: Dublin
- County: County Dublin
- Time zone: UTC+0 (WET)
  - Summer (DST): UTC-1 (IST (WEST))
- Eircode routing key: D6W, D12

Kimmage (Irish: Camaigh or Camaigh uisce, meaning "crooked water-meadow", possibly referring to the meandering course of the River Poddle), is a suburb of Dublin, Ireland.

== Location ==
Kimmage is to the south of Dublin city centre, outside the ring of canals, but before the M50 ring motorway or the Dublin mountains. Kimmage is primarily administered by Dublin City Council, with its southern fringes falling under the jurisdiction of South Dublin County Council. It is surrounded by Crumlin, Walkinstown, Greenhills, Harold's Cross, Rathfarnham, Templeogue, and Terenure. Kimmage is divided between postal districts Dublin 12 and Dublin 6W.

== History ==
The name Kimmage can be referenced back to at least the time of the patent rolls of 1415.

Larkfield, an old mill and farm in Kimmage owned by the family of Joseph Plunkett, was used as a clearing station for arms imported in the 1914 Howth gun-running for use in the 1916 Easter Rising. An Irish Volunteers secret camp, the Kimmage Garrison, was established by Plunkett and his brother George Oliver Plunkett. IRB members with engineering skills came from England and Scotland and lived rough for three months while they manufactured bombs, bayonets and pikes for the coming Easter Rising on the site that is now the SuperValu shopping centre.

On Easter Monday, 1916, Captain George Plunkett waved down a tram with his revolver at Harold's Cross, ordered on his volunteers armed with shotguns, pikes and homemade bombs, took out his wallet and said "Fifty-two tuppenny tickets to the city centre please". The group went to Liberty Hall before being organised into four companies, and with the other volunteers, marched to seize the General Post Office.

In the late 1940s and early 1950s, the park facing the end of Stannaway Road was known locally as the 'Tip'. The Tip had a water-filled quarry which froze over in the winter. In one tragic incident during the summer of 1941, an 11 year old boy drowned while traversing the water on a makeshift raft.

The Poddle fed the millrace at the end of the pond in the grounds of the nearby monastery of Mount Argus. In the 1950s and 1960s, this two-storey building housed St Gabriel's Boys Club, which was well supported by the local community when they staged Gilbert and Sullivan operettas.

The residential area between Ferns Road and Kildare Road was architecturally designed in the shape of a Celtic Cross, with a mirror image each side of Armagh Road. Locally this road was considered as dividing Crumlin and Kimmage. The majority of these roads were named after mediaeval monasteries such as Clonmacnoise, Clonard, Kells and Monasterboice. Stannaway Road originally ran from Sundrive Road, up to and just beyond Cashel Road, where the scheme ended with a wall across the roadway that was demolished in the 1940s/1950s when an extension to the original scheme commenced. Blarney Park also had a similar wall separating the Dublin Corporation houses from a private scheme. In the 1950s, residents in the Corporation houses objected to being cut off and broke a hole through. The hole was gradually made larger and the Corporation deemed the wall unsafe and eventually demolished it. Access through the private section then became the norm. The Corporation devised a privatisation policy in the 1970s and sold council homes to the existing tenants. Captain's Road (previously Captain's Lane) runs from the top of Windmill Road in Crumlin to Kimmage Road. There were only a few houses between the schools (St Columcille CBS and the girls' convent opposite) on Armagh Road and St Agnes Church.

== Features and facilities ==
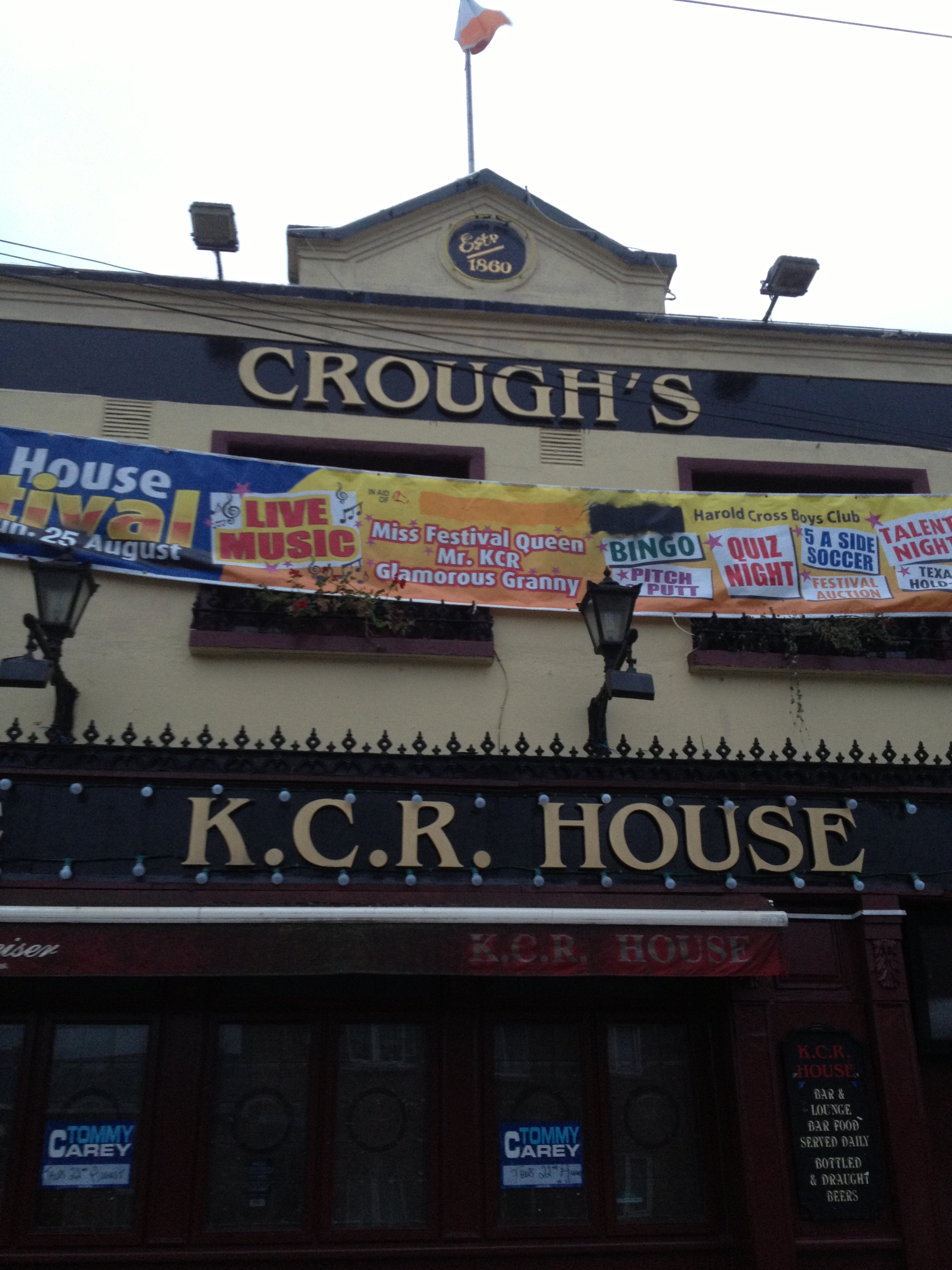
KCR House, a pub in Terenure

The KCR, or Kimmage Cross Roads, is a landmark in Kimmage. The crossroads are considered by locals in the area to denote the southern boundary with Terenure, intersecting Terenure Road West, Kimmage Road West, Fortfield Road, and the Lower Kimmage Road. The KCR is also the location of a petrol station, a pharmacy, and a convenience shop built in the 1930s.

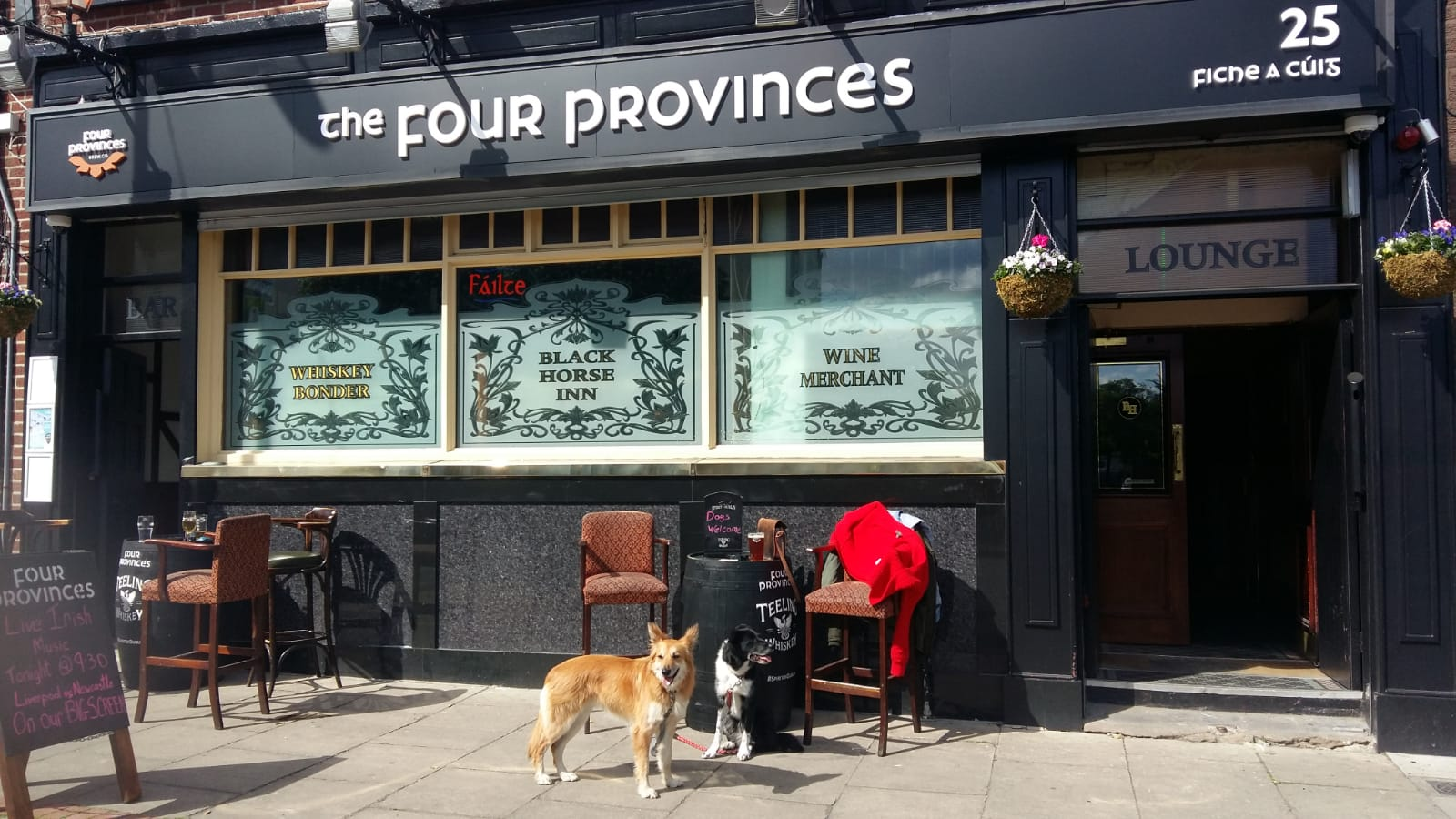
The Four Provinces pub

Crough's KCR House (formerly The Cumann Inn and The Argus Arms) is located close to the KCR. The Stone Boat, named for the feature which separated the Poddle from the City Watercourse, is also a local bar and lounge. The Four Provinces (formerly the Black Horse Inn) on Ravensdale Park was opened in 2019 by the local microbrewery Four Provinces Brew Company. The main shopping area is Kimmage village on the Lower Kimmage Road. The SuperValu shopping centre is located on Sundrive Road, it also houses a pharmacy and a small café.

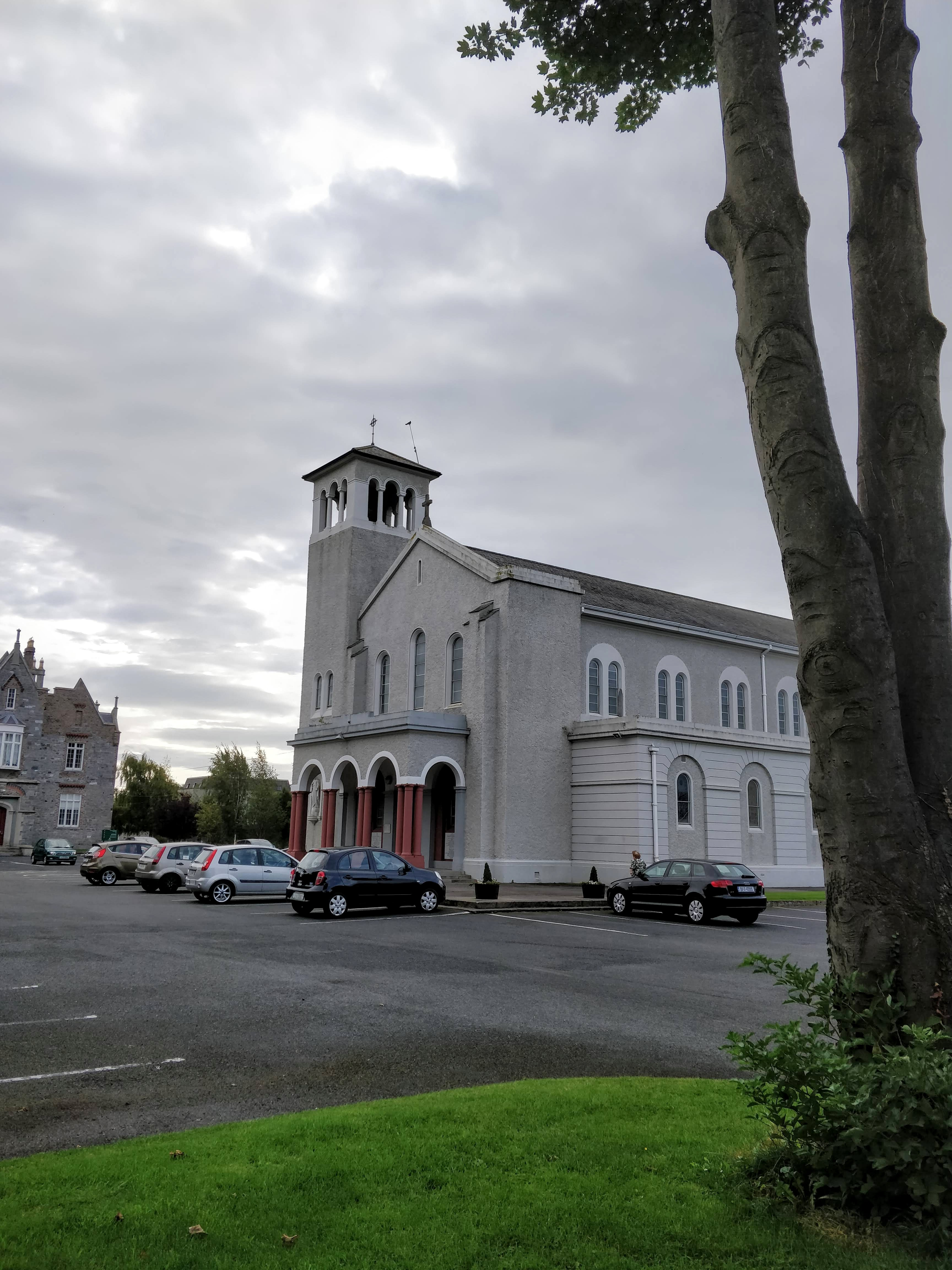
Kimmage Manor Church

At one side of the area is Kimmage Manor, the former location of The Holy Ghost Fathers College which prepared priests for the religious life, later hosting the Kimmage Mission Institute and the Kimmage Development Studies Centre. Kimmage Manor Church parish church is on its grounds, and the main building holds the provincial office of the Spiritan order.

== Sport ==
Larkview FC are a senior association football (soccer) team from the area who play in the Leinster Senior League. Former Republic of Ireland football manager Brian Kerr played at junior level for the club. Reds United were another soccer club for which many Kimmage residents played in the 1940s and 1950s.

Lorcan O'Toole Park is the main sports ground in the area located at Stannaway Road in nearby Crumlin. Old County Pitch & Putt Club (founded 1966) is based within Lorcan O'Toole Park with the championship course surrounding the GAA pitch.

== Popular culture ==
Kimmage was one of the two cheaper properties on the Irish version of Monopoly (along with Crumlin), but has now been removed in favour of Rathfarnham in the newer edition.

Three Lovely Lassies from Kimmage is a humorous Irish folk song by the Dubliners.

Whoredom in Kimmage is a non-fiction 1994 book by Rosemary Mahoney about women in the Ireland of the 1990s.

== Notable people ==
- Brendan Behan grew up in Kildare Road; his family were relocated from a city centre tenement to what was then countryside – as he later joked, "To Hell or to Kimmage" (Oliver Cromwell is said to have sent Irish aristocrats from their lush Munster, Leinster and Ulster land "To Hell or to Connacht", offering them the choice of death or exile)
- Christy Brown (1932-1981) Irish writer, painter, and poet was born on Stannaway Road, Crumlin.
- Denis Fahey (1883–1954) founder of the right-wing Catholic organisation Maria Duce, served as a Senior Scholasticate of the Irish Province of the Holy Ghost Fathers at Kimmage in 1912
- Aengus Finucane (1932–2009), missionary and a pioneer for Concern Worldwide
- John Charles McQuaid (1895–1973) studied as a novice at the headquarters of the Holy Ghost Fathers in Kimmage; he was later Archbishop of Dublin and Primate of Ireland
- Gay Mitchell, Fine Gael MEP and 2011 presidential candidate
- Joseph Plunkett (1887–1916); one of the seven leaders of the Easter Rising and signatories of the Proclamation of the Irish Republic, had a family property at Larkfield on Sundrive crossroad that was a training ground for the rebels before the Rising
- Frederick Shaw, Irish Conservative Baronet and large and hated landlord, lived in Kimmage Manor
- Albert Manifold, former CEO of CRH plc and chairman of BP

== See also ==
- List of towns and villages in Ireland
