= Walkinstown =

Suburb of Dublin, Ireland

Walkinstown Baile Bhailcín (Irish)
- Suburb
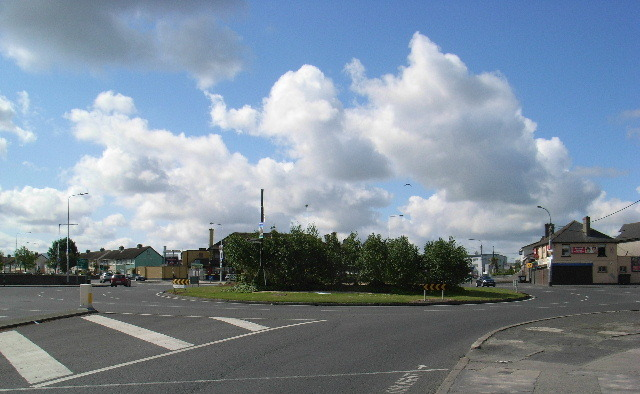
- Walkinstown roundabout

- Location in Ireland
- Coordinates: 53°19′17″N 6°20′02″W
- Country: Ireland
- Province: Leinster
- County: County Dublin
- Council: Dublin City Council
- Dáil Éireann: Dublin South-Central
- European Parliament: Dublin

Population (2022)
  - Electoral divisions: 7,442
- Time zone: UTC+0 (WET)
  - Summer (DST): UTC-1 (IST (WEST))
- Eircode routing key: D12

Walkinstown (Irish: Baile Bhailcín) is a suburb of Dublin, Ireland, approximately 6 km (4 mi) southwest of Dublin city centre. It is surrounded by Drimnagh to the north, Crumlin to the east, Greenhills to the south, and Ballymount, Bluebell, and Clondalkin to the west. It lies within the postal district of Dublin 12.

It consists mainly of privately owned housing, with some social housing remaining in the Dublin City Council area between the Walkinstown and Long Mile Roads and Ballymount Lower. It was built as an estate of starter homes after World War II.

Walkinstown has a library, community centre, sports grounds, schools, pubs and a Catholic church. The 2022 census recorded a population of 7,422 people for all electoral divisions labelled as Walkinstown.

== Name ==
The name of the area is a corruption of Wilkinstown – named after Wilkins, a tenant farmer who lived in the area in the 15th century. The Irish name for the area is Baile Bhailcín.

== History ==
Evidence of ancient settlement in the area includes a number of holy well and burial sites in the townlands of Wilkinstown and Greenhills. A Bronze Age Linkardstown-type burial, containing a cist burial covered by a mound and cairn, was excavated at Walkinstown Park in the 1930s.

Walkinstown, as a suburb, was a 20th-century creation. The area was a dairy farm until house building began in the 1930s and ended in the 1970s when most of the land was built on. Primary and secondary schools were built in the 1950s and 1960s. The local Catholic church, the Church of the Assumption of the Blessed Mary, was built in 1954.

One of several iconic moments from Ireland's unexpected success in the 1990 FIFA World Cup took place at Walkinstown roundabout on 25 June 1990. That afternoon, after Ireland beat Romania on penalties to reach the quarter finals of the competition, crowds emerged from several nearby pubs and "invaded" the roundabout to celebrate the win. Amateur footage of the joyous scenes at the junction became synonymous with the mood in the country at the time. In July 2020, ten days after former Irish football manager Jack Charlton died, fans gathered at the roundabout to recreate the moment and pay their respects.

== Location and extent ==
Walkinstown lies within the postal district of Dublin 12 and the Dáil constituency of Dublin South-Central. The electoral divisions of Walkinstown A, B and C have their northern boundaries along the Naas Road, western boundary at the Cammock River, eastern boundary at St. Agnes Road, and southern limits at the boundary between the Dublin City Council and South Dublin County Council local authority areas.

Neighbouring Greenhills, which was previously within the Catholic parish of Walkinstown, became a separate parish when a new church was built in Greenhills in 1971. Ballymount, which also borders Walkinstown, is considered by some to form part of Walkinstown. The Ballymount area is primarily given over to light industry with less residential housing than Walkinstown. The housing which does exist directly borders the Ballymount Road – which is sometimes listed as being in Walkinstown.

== Amenities ==
Walkinstown Library, a branch of the Dublin City Libraries service, is located on Percy French Road. Walkinstown's post office is in the supermarket on Walkinstown Road.

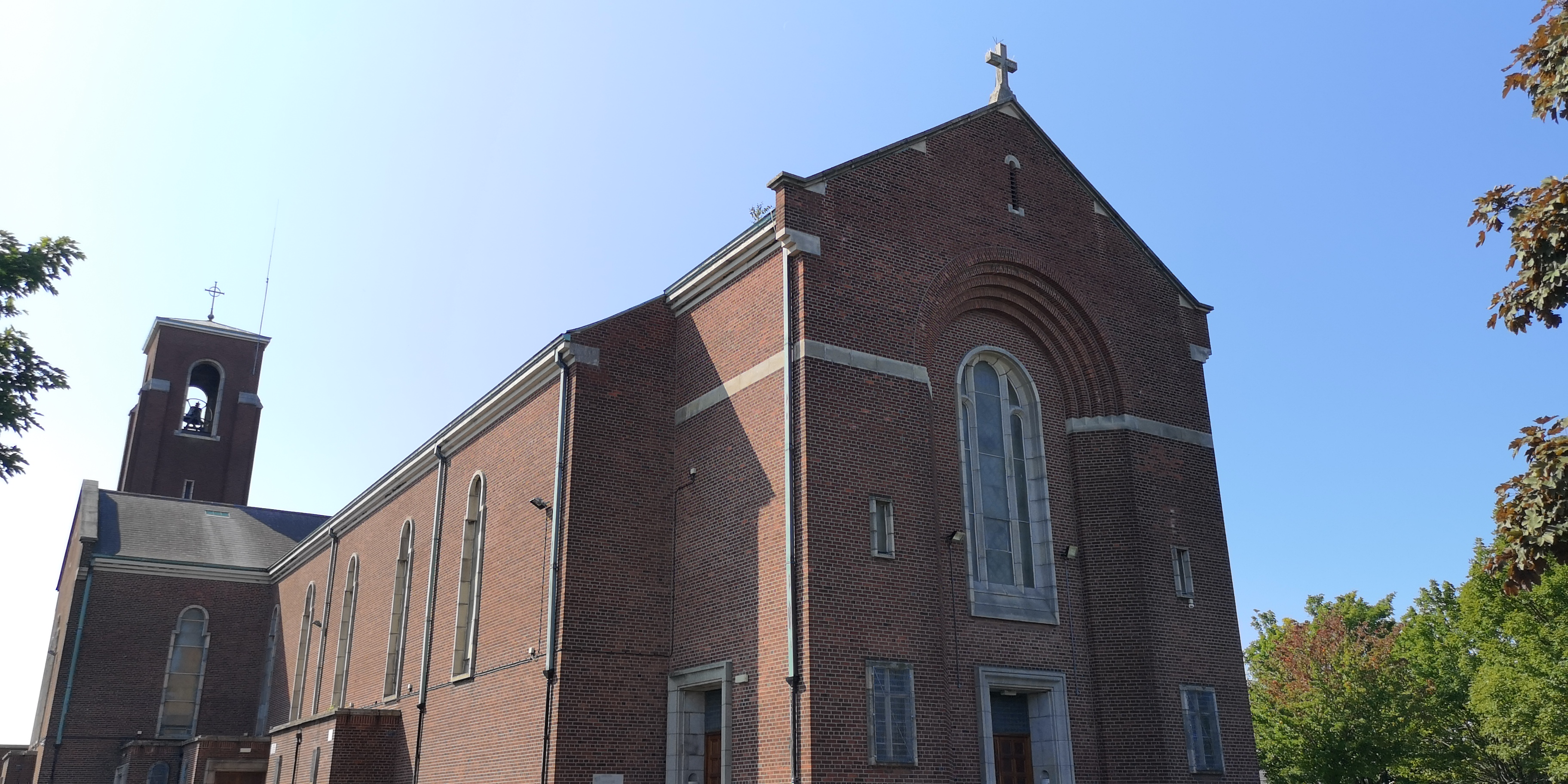
The Church of the Assumption of the Blessed Mary, on Walkinstown Green, was built in 1954

The local Catholic Church, Our Lady of the Assumption on Kilnamanagh Road, forms part of a concentration of religious and educational buildings in the area. These include a girls' school, Our Lady of the Assumption, beside the church and a boys' school, Drimnagh Castle CBS, across the Long Mile Road. Both schools provide primary and secondary education.

Walkinstown Park, on Walkinstown Avenue, is maintained by Dublin City Council. It has a tennis court and several sports pitches. The Walkinstown Stream, a tributary of the River Cammock, runs along a boundary of the park. There is a children's playground at Walkinstown Green.

The Walkinstown Association, which provides services to people with intellectual disabilities, is based on the Long Mile Road. The local Scouting Ireland group is the 94th Dublin.

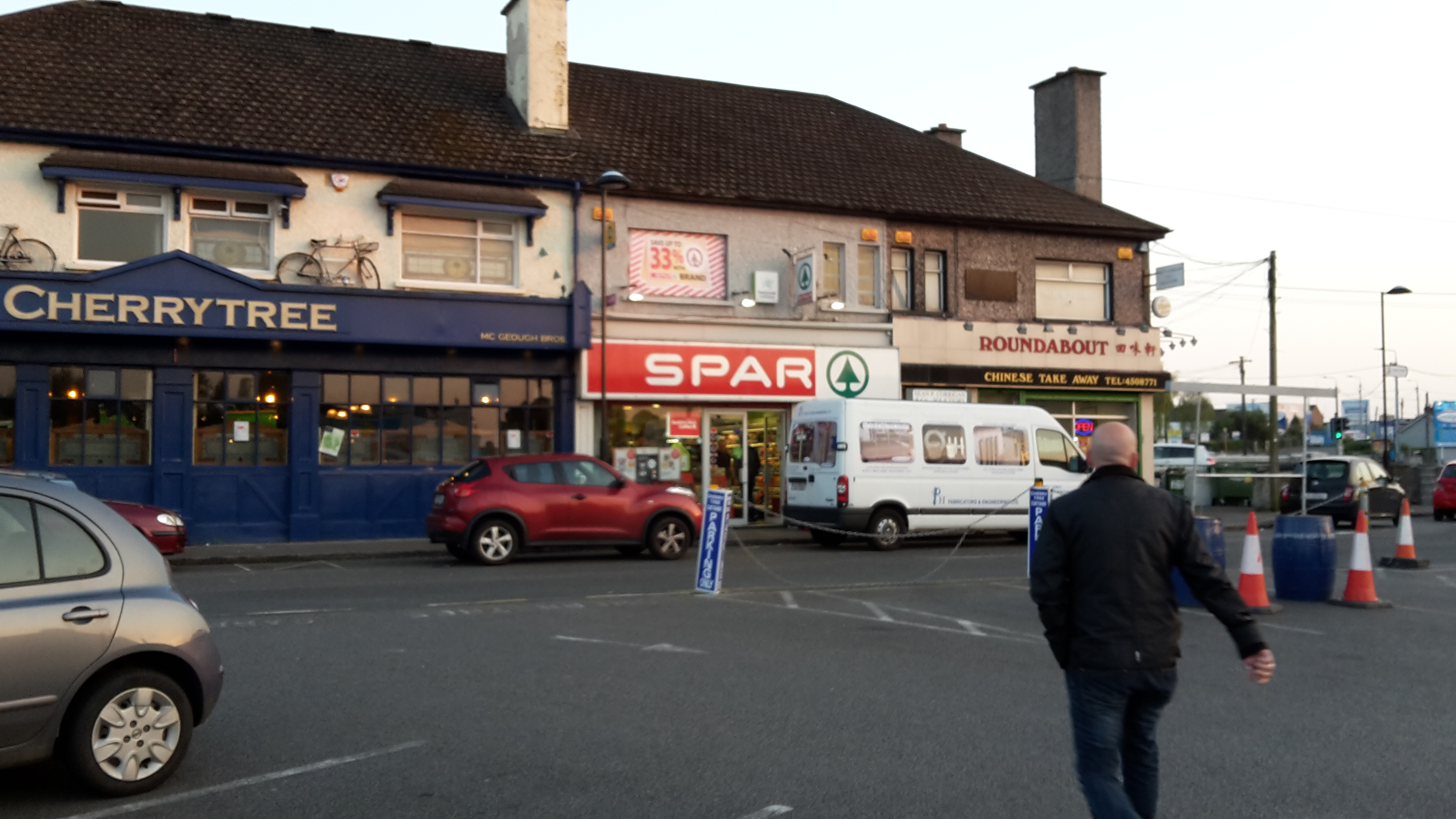
A Spar shop in Walkinstown

Retail outlets in the area include a SuperValu supermarket (Walkinstown Road), a Lidl supermarket (Walkinstown Avenue) and an Aldi (Long Mile Road). Several small commercial services, including newsagents, pharmacies and fast food restaurants, are located at the intersection of the Drimnagh, Walkinstown and Long Mile roads and near the Walkinstown Roundabout.

Walkinstown Roundabout is one of the busiest in the city. Its construction was reportedly held up for a number of years due to protracted negotiations to purchase a small whitewashed cottage on the then Walkinstown Cross.

== Local landmarks ==
One of the oldest buildings in Walkinstown is Drimnagh Castle on the northern side of Long Mile Road. It dates from 1216 and is the only castle in Ireland with a flooded moat. The Halfway House pub is the oldest one in the area, predating all of the modern housing developments. The pub used to be a coachhouse, halfway between Dublin and Tallaght.

Walkinstown Roundabout or Walkinstown Cross is one of the busiest roundabouts in Dublin. This junction serves six local roads – Walkinstown Road towards Drimnagh, Bunting Road towards Crumlin, Cromwellsfort Road towards Kimmage and Crumlin, and St Peter's Road towards Greenhills and Templeogue, Greenhills Road towards Tallaght and Ballymount Road towards Ballymount. It also serves the M50 and Walkinstown Avenue towards Ballyfermot.

An area of Walkinstown, north of Cromwellsfort Road, contains a number of streets known as the "musical roads". Roads in this area are named after several figures in Irish music, inducing the tenor Count John McCormack and composers Michael William Balfe, Percy French, and Edward Bunting.

== Administration ==
Walkinstown is in the southwest of the Dublin City Council area and in local government elections is part of the Ballyfermot-Drimnagh Ward. Since the last local elections in 2024, local representatives on the council are:

- Ray Cunningham (Green Party (Ireland))
- Hazel de Nortúin (People Before Profit)
- Daithí Doolan (Sinn Féin)
- Vincent Jackson (politician) (Independent)
- Philip Sutcliffe Snr (Independent Ireland)

Walkinstown is part of the Dáil constituency of Dublin South-Central. The TD for the 34th Dáil are:

- Catherine Ardagh (Fianna Fáil)
- Jen Cummins (Social Democrats (Ireland))
- Máire Devine (Sinn Féin)
- Aengus Ó Snodaigh (Sinn Féin)

== Sport ==
The first Gaelic Athletic Association (GAA) club in the area, St Gerard's Walkinstown Hurling and Football Club, was formed in the 1950s. It subsequently amalgamated with other clubs to form St James Gaels GAA club. The club maintains facilities in Walkinstown, including at Mooney's Field.

The local association football (soccer) team, Walkinstown United Football Club, plays its home games in Walkinstown Park.

Walkinstown Sports and Athletic Association (WSAF) meets at Moeran Community Hall on Summerville Drive. The hall officially opened in 1964.

== Transport ==
Walkinstown is served by several Dublin Bus services, including routes 27, 56A, 77A, 151 and F3. The Dublin Bus Nitelink 77N service provides a one-way link from the city to Walkinstown Roundabout. The area is also served by the Go-Ahead Ireland route 73.

The Luas tram Red Line has stops at Bluebell and Kylemore to the north of Walkinstown.

A former DHL Express mail courier depot in Walkinstown has, since 2018, been a used as a depot for the Go-Ahead Ireland bus service.

== People ==
- Gabriel Byrne, actor
- Eamonn Campbell, of The Dubliners musical group, lived in Walkinstown for a time
- Kevin Moran, Gaelic Athletic Association and association football player
- Valerie O'Leary, scientist and researcher

== See also ==
- List of towns and villages in Ireland
