= List of knights bachelor appointed in 1900 =

Knight Bachelor is the oldest and lowest-ranking form of knighthood in the British honours system; it is the rank granted to a man who has been knighted by the monarch but not inducted as a member of one of the organised orders of chivalry. Women are not knighted; in practice, the equivalent award for a woman is appointment as Dame Commander of the Order of the British Empire (founded in 1917).

In 1900, 51 people were invested Knights Bachelor; 11 were to Irish subjects (including Edward Carson, on his appointment as Solicitor General for England and Wales), one was from Guernsey and 13 were people in other parts of the British Empire.

== Knights bachelor appointed in 1900 ==
Source: William A. Shaw, The Knights of England, vol. 2 (London: Sherratt and Hughes, 1906), pp. 405–408.

| Date | Name | Notes |
|---|---|---|
| 22 January 1900 | The Hon. John Stokell Dodds | Chief Justice of the Supreme Court of the Colony of Tasmania |
| 22 January 1900 | Francis Henry Lovell | Surgeon-General and Member of the Executive and Legislative Councils of the Colony of Trinidad and Tobago |
| 22 January 1900 | Malcolm Donald McEacharn | Mayor of Melbourne |
| 2 February 1900 | V. Bhashyam Aiyangar | Diwan Bahadur acting Advocate General, Madras |
| 5 February 1900 | Bhalchandra Krishna Bhatawadekar, JP | Chairman of the Standing Committee of the Municipal Corporation, Bombay |
| 9 February 1900 | Gerald Raoul de Courcy-Perry, CMG | HM Consul-General at Antwerp |
| 9 February 1900 | James Balfour Paul | Lyon King of Arms |
| 9 February 1900 | Thomas Henry Tacon, JP, DL | |
| 9 February 1900 | William Theodore Doxford, MP | |
| 9 February 1900 | Walter Thorburn, MP | |
| 9 February 1900 | Thomas Launder Brunton, MD, FRS | |
| 17 February 1900 | George Dalhouse Ramsay | |
| 3 March 1900 | Henry Burton Buckley, QC | High Court Judge |
| 5 March 1900 | Otto Jaffé | Formerly Lord Mayor of Belfast |
| 12 March 1900 | The Rt Hon. Samuel James Way | Lieutenant-Governor and Chief Justice of the Supreme Court of the Colony of South Australia; Chancellor of the University of Adelaide; Member for the Australasian Colonies of the Judicial Committee of the Privy Council |
| 29 March 1900 | Alderman William Purdis Treloar | Sheriff of the City of London |
| 29 March 1900 | Alfred Henry Bevan | Sheriff of the City of London |
| 15 May 1900 | William Macpherson | Judge of the High Court of Judicature at Fort William |
| 1 May 1900 | The Rt Hon. Edward Henry Carson, QC, MP | Solicitor General for England and Wales. He was appointed to that office (which then carried a knighthood customarily) on 11 May 1900 and had been invested with the knighthood by 17 May 1900. |
| 25 May 1900 | Daniel Joseph Hegarty | Lord Mayor of Cork |
| 25 May 1900 | William McLearn | Mayor of Londonderry |
| 25 May 1900 | Joseph Downes | High Sheriff of the City of Dublin |
| 25 May 1900 | Alfred Graham Dobbin | High Sheriff of the City of Cork |
| 25 May 1900 | Thomas Henry Cleeve | High Sheriff of the City of Limerick |
| 25 May 1900 | John William Moore, MD | President of the Royal College of Physicians of Ireland |
| 25 May 1900 | Thomas Drew | President of the Royal Institute of Architects of Ireland |
| 25 May 1900 | John Malcolm Inglis | President of the Dublin Chamber of Commerce |
| 25 May 1900 | Thomas William Robinson | Chairman of Kingstown Urban District Council |
| 27 June 1900 | Arthur James Richens Trendell | Assistant Secretary of the Science and Art Department |
| 27 June 1900 | John Groves | Formerly Mayor of Weymouth |
| 27 June 1900 | John Glover, JP | Chairman of the City Liberal Unionist Association and of Lloyd's Registry of British and Foreign Shipping |
| 27 June 1900 | Thomas Godfrey Carey | Bailiff of Guernsey |
| 27 June 1900 | William Wilson Mitchell | Member of the Legislative Council of Ceylon |
| 27 June 1900 | Charles Arnold White | Chief Justice of Madras |
| 27 June 1900 | James Williamson | Director of HM Dockyards |
| 27 June 1900 | William Ward | HM Consul-General at Hamburg |
| 27 June 1900 | Allan Arthur | Member of the Viceroy of India's Legislative Council |
| 30 June 1900 | Hector Clare Cameron | President of the Faculty of Physicians and Surgeons, Glasgow |
| 30 June 1900 | John Watney | Clerk of the Mercers' Company and Hon. Secretary of the City and Guilds of London Institute for the Advancement of Technical Education |
| 30 June 1900 | Henry Homewood Crawford | Solicitor of the Corporation of London |
| 30 June 1900 | George Hare Philipson, MD | President of the University of Durham College of Medicine |
| 30 June 1900 | Charles Clement Bowring, JP | |
| 30 June 1900 | Alderman William Haswell Stephenson | Alderman of the City of Newcastle |
| 30 June 1900 | Richard Claverhouse Jebb, MP | Regius Professor of Greek in the University of Cambridge |
| 30 June 1900 | Colin George Macrae, WS | Formerly Chairman of the School Board of Edinburgh |
| 30 June 1900 | Riley Lord | Mayor of Newcastle upon Tyne |
| 30 June 1900 | James Cornelius O'Dowd | Formerly Deputy Judge Advocate General |
| 16 July 1900 | William Bisset Berry, MD, QC | Speaker of the House of Assembly of the Colony of the Cape of Good Hope |
| 16 July 1900 | David Palmer Ross, MD | Surgeon-General of the Colony of British Guiana |
| 24 October 1900 | Francis Pratt Winter | Chief Judicial Officer of the Possession of British New Guinea |
| 14 December 1900 | Matthew Ingle Joyce | High Court Judge |
