= 1900 Birthday Honours =

In celebration of the birthday of Queen Victoria

The Queen's Birthday Honours 1900 were announced on 23 May 1900 in celebration of the birthday of Queen Victoria. The list included appointments to various orders and honours of the United Kingdom and British India.

The list was published in The Times on 23 May 1900 and on 24 May 1900 (Irish honours), and the various honours were gazetted in The London Gazette on 23 May 1900, on 1 June 1900 and on 8 June 1900.

The recipients of honours are displayed or referred to as they were styled before their new honour and arranged by honour and where appropriate by rank (Knight Grand Cross, Knight Commander etc.) then division (Military, Civil).

== Peerages ==
=== Baron ===
- The Right Honourable Michael Morris, Lord Morris
- The Right Honourable Sir Peter O'Brien, Bart.
- Sir Richard Webster, Bart., GCMG, QC, MP

Her Majesty has also approved the grant to Lord Strathcona and Mount Royal of a new Patent, with remainder to his daughter.

== Privy Council ==
- Lord Justice Gerald FitzGibbon
- Sir Frederick Milner, Bart., MP

== Privy Council of Ireland ==
- Dermot Bourke, 7th Earl of Mayo

== Baronet ==
- Sir George Hayter Chubb
- James Timmins Chance, Esq.
- Edward Walter Greene, Esq.
- Arthur Tredgold Lawson, Esq.
- Thomas Wrightson, Esq., MP

== Knight Bachelor ==
- Charles Clement Bowring, JP of Park Grange, Derby
- Professor Hector Clare Cameron, MD, University of Glasgow
- Henry Homewood Crawford,
- John Glover, Chairman of Lloyd's Shipping Registry
- Thomas Godfrey Carey, Bailiff of Guernsey
- John Groves,
- Professor Richard Claverhouse Jebb, MP
- Riley Lord, Mayor of Newcastle-upon-Tyne
- Colin George Macrae, late Chairman Edinburgh School Board
- James C. O′Dowd, CB
- Alderman William Haswell Stephenson, former Mayor of Newcastle-upon-Tyne
- Arthur James Richens Trendell, CMG
- William Ward, Her Majesty's Consul-General at Hamburg
- John Watney, FSA
- James Williamson, Director of Dockyards to the Admiralty

British Empire

- Honourable William Bisset Berry, MD, QC, Speaker of the House of Assembly, Cape of Good Hope
- William Wilson Mitchell, CMG, Member of the Legislative Council of Ceylon
- David Palmer Ross, MD, CMG, Surgeon-General of British Guiana
- Francis Pratt Winter, CMG, Chief Judicial Officer of British New Guinea
- Allan Arthur, President of the Bengal Chamber of Commerce, late Sheriff of Calcutta and a Member of the Council of the Viceroy of India
- Charles Arnold White, Chief Justice of Madras

Ireland

- Daniel Hegarty, Lord Mayor of Cork
- William McLearn, Mayor of Londonderry
- Joseph Downes, High Sheriff for the City of Dublin
- Alfred Graham Dobbin, High Sheriff for the City of Cork
- Thomas Henry Cleeve, High Sheriff for the City of Limerick
- Thomas W. Robinson, Chairman of Kingstown Urban District Council
- John William Moore, President of the Royal College of Physicians of Ireland
- John Malcolm Inglis, President of the Dublin Chamber of Commerce
- Thomas Drew, President of the Royal Institute of the Architects of Ireland

== The Most Honourable Order of the Bath ==
=== Knight Grand Cross of the Order of the Bath (GCB) ===
Military Division

- General Sir Charles Cooper Johnson, KCB, Indian Staff Corps.
- Lieutenant-General Sir Baker Creed Russell, KCB KCMG, Colonel 13th Hussars, Commanding the Troops, Southern District.
- General Sir William Olpherts, KCB VC, Colonel-Commandant Royal (late Bengal) Artillery.

Civil Division

- The Right Honourable the Earl of Jersey, GCMG

=== Knight Commander of the Order of the Bath (KCB) ===
Military Division

- Colonel Frederick John Keen, CB, Indian Staff Corps.
- General John Louis Nation, CB, Indian Staff Corps.
- General Sir Thomas Edward Gordon, KCIE CB CSI, Indian Staff Corps.
- Lieutenant-Colonel and Colonel (Honorary Major-General) John Hills, CB, Royal (late Bombay) Engineers.
- Major-General Hugh McCalmont, CB, Commanding Cork District.
- Lieutenant-General Edward Hopton, CB, Colonel Connaught Rangers, Lieutenant-Governor and General Officer Commanding the Troops, Jersey.
- Lieutenant-General George Digby Barker, CB, Governor and Commander-in-Chief, Bermuda.
- Lieutenant-General Henry Le Guay Geary, CB, Royal Artillery, President Ordnance Committee.
- Major-General Thomas Fraser, CB CMG, Royal Engineers, Commanding Thames District.
- Major-General John Frederick Maurice, CB, Royal Artillery, Commanding Woolwich District.
- General Alexander George Montgomery Moore, Colonel 18th Hussars, Commanding Aldershot

Civil Division

- John Samuel Purcell, Esq., CB, late Controller of Stamps and Stores, and Registrar of Joint Stock Companies, Inland Revenue Department
- David Gill, Esq., CB, Her Majesty's Astronomer, Cape of Good Hope
- William Conyngham Greene, Esq., CB, of Her Majesty's Diplomatic Service, late British Agent at Pretoria
- Henry Augustus Robinson, Esq., CB, Vice-president Local Government Board, Ireland

=== Companion of the Order of the Bath (CB) ===
Military Division

- Surgeon - General Henry Skey Muir, Deputy Director-General, Army Medical Service.
- Major-General Edmund Smith Brook.
- Lieutenant-Colonel and Colonel Vincent Rivaz, Indian Staff Corps.
- Colonel Andrew McCrae Bruce, Bengal Infantry.
- Lieutenant-Colonel and Brevet Colonel Celadon Charles Brownlow, Indian Staff Corps.
- Lieutenant-Colonel and Brevet Colonel Edward Molloy, Indian Staff Corps.
- Lieutenant-Colonel and Brevet Colonel Robert Alexander Swetenham, Indian Staff Corps.
- Colonel George Hand More-Molyneux, DSO, Indian Staff Corps, Colonel on the Staff, India.
- Colonel William John Vousden, VC, Indian Staff Corps, Colonel on the Staff, India.
- Colonel (temporary Brigadier-General) Henry Pipon, Colonel on the Staff for Royal Artillery, India.
- Colonel (temporary Major-General) Frederick Wilson Hemming, Commanding Cavalry Brigade, Aldershot (temporarily).
- Colonel Hugh Gough Grant, Regimental District.
- Colonel Richard Charles Hare, Regimental District.
- Colonel Charles Hervey Bagot, Royal Engineers, Deputy Inspector-General of Fortifications, Headquarters of Army.
- Colonel Arthur Robert Ford Dorward, DSO, Colonel on the Staff for Royal Engineers, Wei-hai-Wei.
- Colonel Edward Roberts, Army Pay Department.
- Lieutenant-Colonel George Vaughan Hamilton, late Army Service Corps.
- Veterinary-Lieutenant-Colonel (temporary Veterinary-Colonel) Henry Thomson, Army Veterinary Department.
- Lieutenant-Colonel Benjamin Bloomfield Connolly, Surgeon-Lieutenant-Colonel, late Army Medical Staff.
- Major and Brevet Lieutenant-Colonel Edmund Spencer Eardley Childers, Royal Engineers.

Civil Division

- Alfred Bonham Carter, Esq, late Referee of Private Bills, House of Commons
- William Donaldson, Esq, late of the Scottish Prison Commission
- James Brown Dougherty, Esq, Assistant Under-secretary, Dublin Castle
- James Gairdner, Esq, late of the Public Record Office
- Edward Stafford Howard, Esq, Senior Commissioner of Her Majesty's Woods and Forests
- Colonel Herbert William Jackson, employed with the Egyptian Army
- John Arrow Kempe, Esq, Deputy-Chairman Customs Establishment
- Charles Dowson Lang, Esq, Controller Savings Bank Department, General Post Office
- Alexander Carnegie Ross, Esq, British Consul at Lorenzo Marques
- Major John Trenchard Tennant, Assistant Secretary, Board of Agriculture
- Charles Inigo Thomas, Esq, Principal Clerk, Admiralty
- Thomas Edward Thorpe, Esq FRS, Principal of the Government Laboratory, Somerset House

== Order of the Star of India ==
=== Knight Commander of the Order of the Star of India (KCSI) ===
- His Highness Maharao Umed Singh Bahadur, of Kotah.

=== Companion of the Order of the Star of India (CSI) ===
- Henry Martin Winterbotham, Esq., Indian Civil Service.
- Arthur Henry Temple Martindale, Esq., Indian Civil Service.
- Frederick Robert Upcott, Esq., Secretary .to the Government of India in the Public Works Department.
- Herbert Charles Fanshawe, Esq., Indian Civil Service.
- Edward Norman Baker, Esq., Indian Civil Service.

== Order of St Michael and St George ==
=== Knights Grand Cross of the Order of St Michael and St George (GCMG) ===
- Sir Henry Mortimer Durand, KCSI, KCIE, Her Majesty's Envoy Extraordinary and Minister Plenipotentiary to His Majesty the Emperor of China, for his services in China.
- Sir Claude Maxwell MacDonald, KCB, KCMG, Her Majesty's Envoy Extraordinary and Minister Plenipotentiary to His Majesty the Shah of Persia, for his services in Persia.

=== Knights Commander of the Order of St Michael and St George (KCMG) ===
- Alfred Edmund Bateman, Esq., CMG, Comptroller-General of the Commercial, Labour and Stratistical Department of the Board of Trade, for services in connection with commercial negotiations with foreign countries.
- Ewen Cameron, Esq., managing director of the Hong Kong and Shanghai Banking Corporation, for services to Her Majesty's Government with regards to affairs in China

=== Companions of the Order of St Michael and St George (CMG) ===
- Joseph Flint, Esq., Agent-General for Nigeria
- Harry English Fulford, Esq., Her Majesty's Consul at Niuzhuang
- Alfred St. John, Esq., Esq., Her Majesty's Consul-General at Callao
- Hamilton Hunter, Esq., Acting British Counsul at Samoa
- Claude William Kinder, Esq., MICE, for services in connection with Railways in North China
- Charles Coles, Esq. (Coles Pasha), Director-General of the Egyptian Prisons Department
- Walsh Wrightson, Esq., Director of Public Works at Trinidad and Tobago

== Order of the Indian Empire ==
=== Knights Grand Commander of the Order of the Indian Empire (GCIE) ===
- His Highness Saramad-i-Rajaha-i-Hindustan, Raj Rajindra Sri Maharajadhiraj Sawai Sir Madho Singh Bahadur, of Jaipur, G.C.S.I.
- His Highness Saramad-i-Rajaha-i-Bundelkhand Maharaja Mabindra Sawai Sir Pratap Singh Bahadur, of Orchha, K.C.I.E.

=== Knight Commander of the Order of the Indian Empire (KCIE) ===
- Sahibzada Muhammad Obeidullah Khan, C.S.I, Minister of Tonk in Rajputana.

=== Companions of the Order of the Indian Empire (CIE) ===
- Diwan Bahadur Pakam Rajaratna Mudaliyar, Inspector-General of Registration, Madras.
- Walter Charleton Hughes, Esq., Chairman of the City of Bombay Improvement Trust.
- Colonel Sydney Long Jacob, R.E., Chief Engineer and Secretary to the Government of the Punjab in the Public Works Department.
- Lieutenant-Colonel Aylmer Martin Crofts, Indian Medical Service.
- Edmund Penny, Esq., Superintending Engineer and late Secretary .to the Chief. Commissioner of. the Central Provinces, in the Public Works Department.
- Henry Marsh, Esq., Superintending Engineer, Irrigation Department, North-Western Provinces.
- Captain Bertrand Evelyn Mellish Gurdon, D.S.O., Assistant Political Agent at Chitral.
- George Macartney, Esq., Assistant to the Resident in Kashmir for Chinese Affairs.
- Rai Bahadur Kailash Chandra Bose.
- Henry Felix Hertz, Esq., Assistant Superintendent of Police, Burma.

=== Honorary Companion of the Order of the Indian Empire (CIE) ===
- General Houtum Schindler.

== Kaisar-i-Hind Medal ==
- Abdul Husain Adamji Pirbhai, Esq., Justice of the Peace, Councillor of the Bombay Municipal Corporation, and late Sheriff of Bombay.
- His Highness the Maharaja of Bikaner.
- Captain Alfred Horsford Bingley, Indian Staff Corps.
- Oswald Vivian Bosanquet, Esq., Indian CivilService, Political Agent in Bhopawar, Central India.
- Major-General Charles John Burnett, C.B., British Service, Commanding the Poona District.
- Denis Calnan, Esq., Indian Civil Service, Magistrate and Collector, North-West Provinces and Oudh.
- Lieutenant-Colonel Robert Neil Campbell, M.B., Indian Medical Service, Civil Surgeon of Shillong.
- Alfred Chatterton, Esq., Indian Educational Service, Professor in the College of Engineering, Madras.
- Major-General Thomas Arthur Cooke, President of the Plague Committee, Karachi, 1897.
- The Maharaja Rameshwara Singh Bahadur, of Darbhanga in Bengal, Additional Member of the Council of the Governor-General for making laws and regulations.
- Major-General Sir William Forbes Gatacre, K.C.B., D.S.O., Chairman of the. Plague Committee of Bombay City, 1896, 1897.
- His Highness the Maharaja of Gwalior, G.C.S.I.
- Walter Home, Esq., M.I.C.E., Superintending Engineer, Joihpur, Rajputana.
- Robert Humphreys, Esq., B.A., Indian Civil Service, Deputy Commissioner of Hissar, Punjab.
- The Maharani of Hatwa in the Saran District, Bengal.
- Captain Charles Henry James, Indian Medical Service, Plague Medical Officer in the Jullundur and Hoshiarpur District.
- Khaehar Ala Chela, C.S.I., Chief of Jasdan in the Bombay Presidency.
- Richard Amphlett Lamb, Esq., Indian Civil Service, Magistrate and Collector, Ahmednagar.
- Sir Francis William Maclean, K.C.I.E., Q.C., Chief Justice of the High Court of Judicature, Fort William, Bengal, and Chairman of the General Committee of the Indian Famine Charitable Relief Fund.
- Francis St. George Manners Smith, Esq., Executive Engineer of Ajmere, Rajputana.
- Vishwanath Patankar Madhava Rao, Esq., C.I.E., Member of the State Council of Mysore.
- Behramji Mehrvanji Malabari, Esq., Justice of the Peace, Proprietor and Editor of the Indian Spectator, Bombay.
- Muhammad Yusuf Ismail, of Rangoon.
- Rai Bahadur Nanak Chand, Minister to His Highness the Maharaja Holkar of Indore.
- Colonel Duncan George Pitcher, Indian Staff Corps, Director of Land Records, Gwalior State.
- Henry Sharp, Esq., M.A., Indian Educational Service, Inspector of Schools, Central Provinces, and Famine Relief Officer, Bstul District.
- William Didsbury Sheppard, Esq., Indian Civil Service, Magistrate and Collector, Poona.
- Donald Mackenzie Smeaton, Esq., M.A., C.S.L, Indian Civil Service, Honorary Secretary of the General Committee of the Indian Famine Charitable Relief Fund.
- Smarta Sri Ram, Rai.Bahadur, M.A., LL.B., Honorary Magistrate and vice-chairman of Lucknow Municipality, Member of Legislative Council, North-West Provinces and Oudh.
- Rai Bahadur Trimbak Rao Nilkant Deshmukh, Extra Assistant Commissioner and Superintendent of the Raj Nandgaon State, Central Provinces.
- Raja Venugopala Bahadur of Venkatagiri, Madras Presidency.
- Nawab Sir Vikar-ul-Umra, Bahadur, K.C.I.E., Minister to His Highness the Nizam of Hyderabad.
- Edgar Francis Latimer Winter, Esq., Indian Civil Service, Magistrate aud Collector in the North-West Provinces and Oudh.
