= Arthur Guinness (disambiguation) =

Arthur Guinness (1725–1803) was an Irish entrepreneur who founded the Guinness Brewery.

Arthur Guinness may also refer to:

- Arthur Guinness II (1768–1855), Dublin brewer and banker, father of Benjamin Guinness
- Arthur Guinness, Baron Ardilaun (1840–1915), Irish businessman, politician, and philanthropist
- Arthur C. C. J. Guinness (1841–1897), a son of Richard Samuel Guinness
- Arthur Guinness (New Zealand politician) (1846–1913), Member of Parliament
- Arthur Guinness, 4th Earl of Iveagh (born 1969)
