= James O'Dowd =

James O'Dowd may refer to:

- James Thomas O'Dowd, American bishop of the Catholic Church
- James Cornelius O'Dowd, deputy Judge Advocate General
