= 1895 Birthday Honours =

National awards given by Queen Victoria

The 1895 Birthday Honours were appointments by Queen Victoria to various orders and honours to reward and highlight good works by citizens of the British Empire. The appointments were made to celebrate the official birthday of The Queen, and were published in The Times on 25 May 1895 and in The London Gazette on 25 May 1895 and on 11 June 1895.

The recipients of honours are displayed here as they were styled before their new honour, and arranged by honour, with classes (Knight, Knight Grand Cross, etc.) and then divisions (Military, Civil, etc.) as appropriate.

== United Kingdom and British Empire ==
=== Privy Councillor ===
The Queen appointed the following to Her Majesty's Most Honourable Privy Council:

- William Leigh, 2nd Baron Leigh
- Sir Henry Brougham Loch GCB GCMG

=== Baronetcies ===
- John Tomlinson Brunner MP
- David Dale, of Darlington.
- William Dunn MP
- John Watson, of Earnock, Lanarkshire.

=== Knight Bachelor ===
- Walter Besant.
- William Conway.
- Dr. Joseph Ewart, of Brighton.
- Dr. Christopher Furness MP
- Nicholas John Hannen, Consul-General at Shanghai, and Judge of the Supreme Court for China and Japan.
- Henry Hicks Hocking, Attorney General of Jamaica.
- Henry Irving.
- William Wollaston Karslake QC
- William Hales Hingston of Montreal.
- Joseph Francis Leese QC MP Recorder of Manchester.
- George Charles Mason.
- Lewis Morris.
- Alexander Campbell Onslow, Chief Justice of tho Colony of Western Australia.
- Robert Pullar.
- Dr William Howard Russell.
- Arthur Snowden, Mayor of the City of Melbourne.

=== The Most Honourable Order of the Bath ===
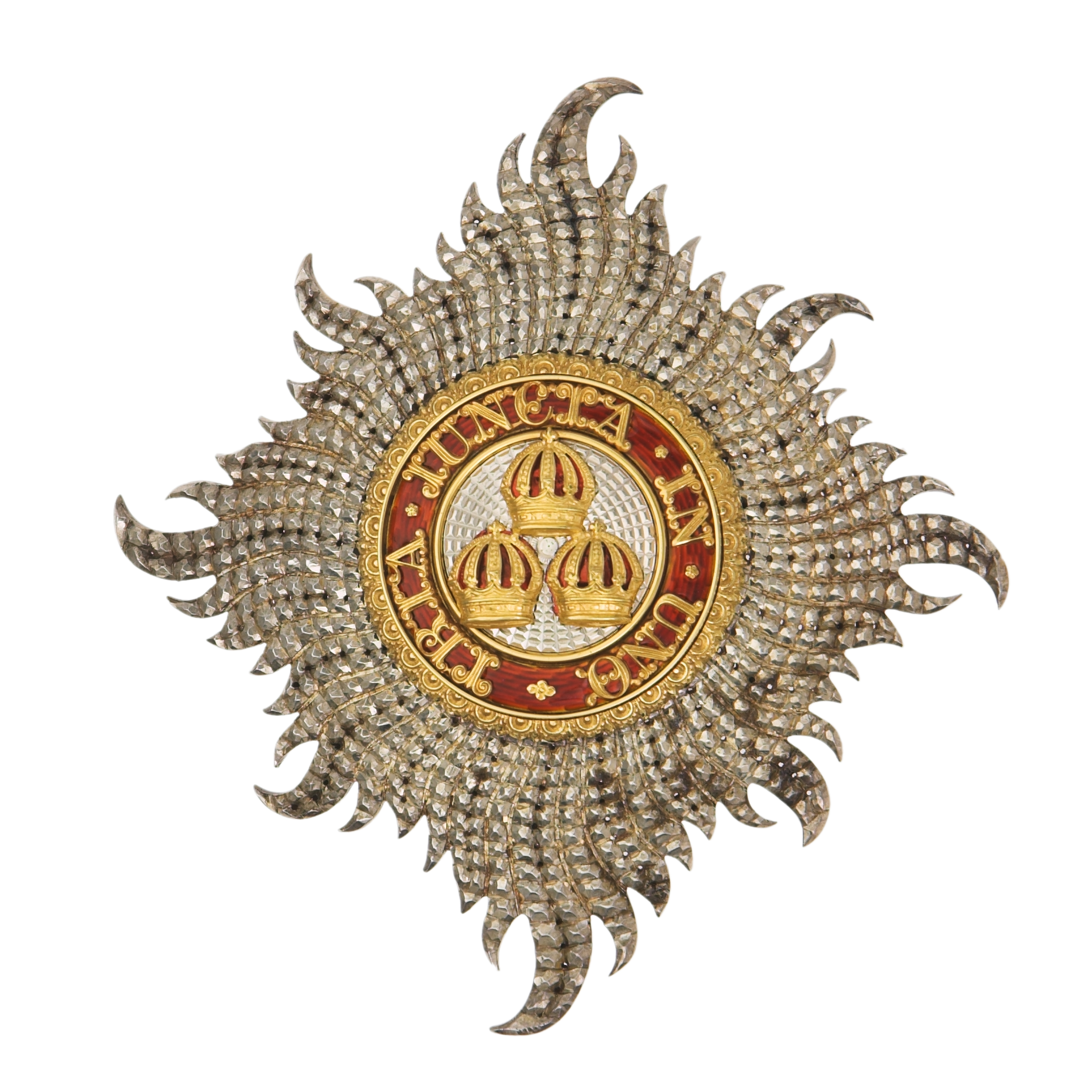
Civilian star of the Knight Grand Cross of the Order of the Bath

==== Knight Grand Cross of the Order of the Bath (GCB) ====
Military Division

- General Sir Michael Anthony Shrapnel Biddulph KCB Colonel-Commandant, Royal Artillery.
- General Sir Charles John Stanley Gough VC KCB Indian Army.
- Admiral Sir William Montagu Dowell KCB
- General Sir George Harry Smith Willis KCB Colonel the Devonshire Regiment.
- Lieutenant-General Sir Drury Curzon Drury-Lowe KCB Colonel 17th Lancers.
- Admiral of the Fleet, Richard Meade, Earl of Clanwilliam KCB KCMG
- Admiral Sir Richard Vesey Hamilton KCB

Civil Division

- The Rt. Hon. the Lord Playfair KCB
- The Rt. Hon. James Stansfeld.

==== Knight Commander of the Order of the Bath (KCB) ====
Military Division

- Vice-Admiral Charles Frederick Hotham CB
- Vice-Admiral Robert O'Brien FitzRoy CB
- Lieutenant-General Henry Brasnell Tuson CB Royal Marine Artillery.
- James Nicholas Dick CB Inspector-General of Hospitals and Fleets, and Director-General of the Medical Department of the Navy.

Civil Division

- Ralph Henry Knox CB Accountant-General of the Army.
- Stair Agnew CB Registrar-General and Deputy Keeper of Records, Scotland.
- Lieutenant-Colonel Arthur John Bigge CB CMG Private Secretary to the Queen.
- Nicholas Roderick O'Conor CB CMG Envoy Extraordinary and Minister Plenipotentiary at Peking.
- Sir David Harrel Kt CB Under Secretary for Ireland.
- Edward Maunde Thompson CB Principal Librarian and Secretary, British Museum.

Honorary

- Honorary Lieutenant-Colonel Raja Ram Singh, C.B. (Honorary), Commander-in-Chief, Kashmir State Troops.

==== Companion of the Order of the Bath (CB) ====
Military Division

- Alfred Douglas Adrian, Assistant-Secretary, Local Government Board.
- Honorary Colonel the Hon. Henry William John Byng, Equerry to the Queen.
- Edward Fairfield CMG Assistant Under Secretary of State, Colonial Office.
- Lieutenant-Colonel Arthur Ford, late Royal Artillery, Inspector of Explosives, Home Office.
- Ralph Milbanke, Secretary of Embassy, Diplomatic Service.
- Richard Edward Sprague Oram, Chief Inspector, Factory Department, Home Office.
- Robert Barrett Stokes, late Capt., 16th Regiment of Foot, Divisional Commissioner, Ireland (Cork Division).
- John Taylor, Surveyor, Office of Works.
- Major Francis Reginald Wingate DSO Royal Artillery.

Civil Division

- Rear-Admiral William James Lloyd Wharton, Hydrographer of the Navy.
- Albert John Durston, Engineer-in-Chief of the Navy.
- Major Henry Pilkington, retired pay, late Royal Engineers, Director of Engineering and Architectural Works, Admiralty.
- Lieutenant Lawrence Hugh Crawford, Royal Naval Reserve.

=== The Most Exalted Order of the Star of India ===
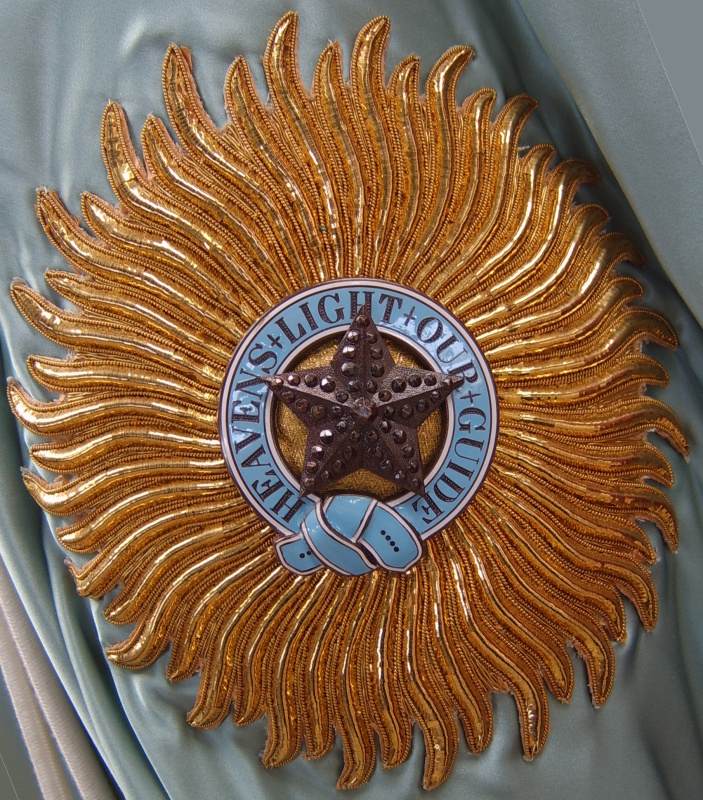
Star of a Knight Grand Commander of the Most Exalted Order of the Star of India.

==== Knight Grand Commander (GCSI) ====
- His Highness the Maharaja Scindia of Gwalior.
- The Rt. Hon. George Robert Canning, Baron Harris GCIE

==== Knight Commander (KCSI) ====
- Lieutenant-General Sir William Stephen Alexander Lockhart KCB CSI

==== Companion (CSI) ====
- Alan Cadell, Indian Civil Service.
- Sir Alexander Edward Miller QC Member of the Council of the Governor-General.
- Charles Montgomery Rivaz, Indian Civil Service.
- Arthur Forbes, Indian Civil Service.
- Kerala Varma Valiya Koil Thampuran.

=== The Most Distinguished Order of Saint Michael and Saint George ===
Star of the Order of Saint Michael and Saint George.

==== Knight Grand Cross of the Order of St Michael and St George (GCMG) ====
- The Rt. Hon. John Hamilton-Gordon, the Earl of Aberdeen PC Governor-General of the Dominion of Canada.
- Lieutenant-Colonel Sir Charles Bullen Hugh Mitchell KCMG Governor and Commander-in-Chief of the Straits Settlements and their Dependencies.

==== Knight Commander of the Order of St Michael and St George (KCMG) ====
- Sir Thomas Fowell Buxton Bt on appointment as Governor and Commander-in-Chief of the Colony of South Australia.
- The Hon. Sir Joseph Palmer Abbott Kt Speaker of the Legislative Assembly of the Colony of New South Wales.
- The Hon. Richard Chaffey Baker CMG President of the Legislative Council of the Colony of South Australia.
- Colonel Richard Edward Rowley Martin CMG British Representative on the late Provisional Government Committee in Swaziland.
- Ernest Mason Satow, Ksq., C.M.G., Her Majesty's Envoy Extraordinary and Minister Plenipotentiary at Tangier.
- John Christian Schultz late Lieutenant-Governor of the Province of Manitoba, in the Dominion of Canada.
- Henri-Gustave Joly de Lotbinière, formerly Premier of the Province of Quebec, in the Dominion of Canada.
- The Hon. William Austin Zeal, President of the Legislative Council of the Colony of Victoria.

==== Companion of the Order of St Michael and St George (CMG) ====
- Leopold Marquard, late Surveyor-General of the Colony of the Cape of Good Hope.
- Charles Boughton Hamilton, Receiver-General of the Colony of British Guiana.
- Archibald Jones Pile, Speaker of the House of Assembly of the Island of Barbados.
- Ernest Bickham Sweet-Escott, Colonial Secretary of the Colony of British Honduras.
- William Wilson Mitchell, Unofficial Member of the Legislative Council of the Island of Ceylon.
- Henrique Charles Shepstone, late Secretary for Native Affairs in the Colony of Natal.
- Joseph Anderson Panton, Police Magistrate in the city of Melbourne, in the Colony of Victoria.
- Francis Henry May, Captain Superintendent of Police in the Colony of Hong Kong.
- Alexander Roland Milne, Collector of Customs at the Port of Victoria, British Columbia, for services in connection with the Bering Sea negotiations.
- Salvatore Luigi Pisani Chief Medical Officer in the Island of Malta.
- Joseph Sylvester O'Halloran, Secretary to the Royal Colonial Institute.
- George Greville, Secretary to Her Majesty's Legation at Rio de Janeiro.
- Raphael Borg, Her Majesty's Consul at Cairo.

=== The Most Eminent Order of the Indian Empire ===
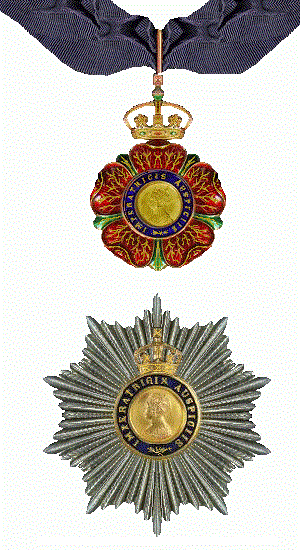
Riband, badge and star of the Knight Grand Commander of the Order of the Indian Empire

==== Knight Commander (KCIE) ====
- Henry Ravenshaw Thuillier
- William Robert Brooke CIE late Director-General of Telegraphs in India
- Maharaja Pratap Narayan Singh of Ayudhya
- Maharaja Ravaneshwar Prasad Singh, Bahadur of Gidhaur
- Sirdar Krishna Rao Bapu Saheb Jadu

==== Companion (CIE) ====
- Gangadhar Rao Madhav Chitnavis
- Rao Bahadur Bashyam lyengar
- Charles Edward Buckland, Indian Civil Service
- Alexander Blackley Patterson, Indian Civil Service
- Henry Arbuthnot Acworth, Indian Civil Service
- Colonel Charles Arkcoll Porteous, Indian Staff Corps
- Colonel Clayton Turner Lane, Indian Staff Corps
- Saw Saing, the Sawbwa of Thibaw
- Steyning William Edgerley, Indian Civil Service
- Trichinopoly Rayalu Arakiaswamy Thumboo Chetty, Member of the Council of Regency, Mysore
- Moulvi Abdul Jubbar, Khan Bahadur
- Captain William Richard Yielding DSO Indian Staff Corps
- Henry John Stanyon
- Munshi Hafiz Abdul Karim
