= General Fraser =

General Fraser may refer to:

- Alexander Fraser (British Army officer, born 1824) (1824–1898), British Army general
- Alexander Fraser, 17th Lord Saltoun (1785–1853), British Army general
- Alexander Mackenzie Fraser (1758–1809), British Army lieutenant general
- Charles Craufurd Fraser (1829–1895), British Army lieutenant general
- Charles 'Pop' Fraser (1915–1994), South African Army lieutenant general
- David Fraser (British Army officer) (1920–2012), British Army general
- David Fraser (military officer) (fl. 1980s–2010s), Canadian Armed Forces major general
- Douglas M. Fraser (born 1953), U.S. Air Force general
- James Stuart Fraser (1783–1869), British Army general
- John Fraser (British Army officer, born 1760) (1760–1843), British Army general
- John Fraser (academic) (c. 1823–1878), Union Army post-service brevet brigadier general
- Joseph Bacon Fraser (1895–1971), Georgia National Guard lieutenant general
- Simon Fraser, 14th Lord Lovat (1871–1933), British Army major general
- Thomas Fraser (British Army officer) (1840–1922), British Army major general
- Tony Fraser (born 1958), Australian Army major general
- William M. Fraser III (born 1952), U.S. Air Force general
- William Archibald Kenneth Fraser (1886–1969), British Indian Army major general

== See also ==
- John W. Frazer (1827–1906), Confederate States Army brigadier general
- Persifor Frazer (1736–1792), Pennsylvania militia brigadier general
