= Arthur Guinness II =

Irish brewer, banker, politician and flour miller (1768–1855)

Arthur Guinness (II)
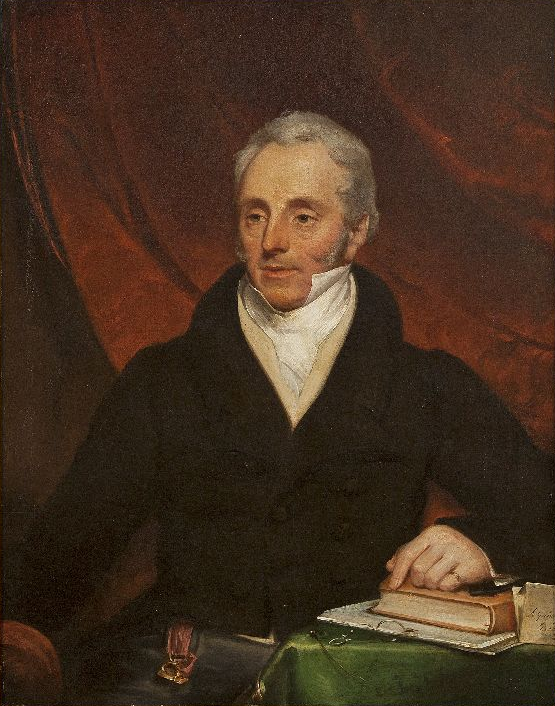
- Portrait by Martin Creegan, in a "Blue and Buff" costume.
- Born: 12 March 1768; Beaumont, Dublin, Ireland
- Died: 9 June 1855 (aged 87); Beaumont, Dublin, Ireland
- Occupations: brewer, banker, politician
- Known for: Guinness Brewery
- Spouses: Anne Lee (m. 1793; died 1817) Maria Barker (m. 1821)
- Children: Revd. William Guinness; Arthur Guinness; Sir Benjamin Guinness, 1st Baronet; Susanna Darley; Elizabeth Jameson; Rebecca Waller
- Parent: Arthur Guinness
- Family: Guinness

Arthur Guinness (12 March 1768 – 9 June 1855) was an Anglo-Irish brewer, banker, politician and flour miller active in Dublin, Ireland. To avoid confusion with his father, also Arthur Guinness (1725–1803), he is often known as "the second Arthur Guinness" or as Arthur Guinness II or Arthur II Guinness.

== Family and early career ==
Arthur Hart Guinness was the second son of Arthur Guinness and his wife Olivia Whitmore, and was born at their home at Beaumont House (now a part of Beaumont Hospital, Dublin). He attended White's Academy in Grafton Street, Dublin, (now the site of Bewley's). Arthur started working for his father at the St James's Gate brewery from the 1780s. In 1790 his father, then aged 65, commented in a letter that the expansion of his brewery was partly due to his help:

"..one of my sons is grown up to be able to assist me in this Business, or I wd not have attempted it, tho' prompted by a demand of providing for Ten Children now living out of one & twenty born to us, & more likely yet to come."

On his marriage to Anne Lee in 1793 the lease of the brewery was assigned to their marriage settlement, proof that he was intended to take over the management of the brewery on his father's death. At the time his younger brothers Benjamin (d.1826) and William (d.1842) were also working in the brewery.

In 1782 his father had also founded the "Hibernian Mills" beside the River Camac in Kilmainham to mill flour for the expanding city's population. This was due to the expansion of Irish exports and commerce fostered from 1779 by the Irish Patriot Party, which the Guinnesses supported.

== The Brewery partnership ==
On his father's death in January 1803, he and his brothers Benjamin and William Lunell created a partnership trading as: "A. B. & W.L. Guinness & Co, brewers and flour millers". He bought Beaumont House from his elder brother the Revd. Hosea Guinness, who was Rector of St. Werburgh's Church, Dublin. In 1808 they bought their first steam engine from Boulton and Watt for pumping water.

Sales grew from 360,936 gallons in 1800 to 2,133,504 gallons by 1815. A slump followed, with sales dropping from 66,000 barrels to 27,000 by 1820.

From its rebuilding in 1797–99 the brewery had stopped brewing ale and concentrated on porter. From the 1820s enhanced and stronger varieties of porter known as "Extra Superior Porter" or "Double Stout" were developed in Dublin for the export trade to Britain. By 1837 the young Benjamin Disraeli mentioned that he had: ".. supped at the Carlton.. off oysters, Guinness and broiled bones".

In the background Arthur's brewery benefited hugely until the 1830s from the difference between the malt tax levied in Britain and Ireland, easing his higher-value exports to Britain, and so Arthur became more of a supporter of the union as it was in the 1830s, having been a supporter of Grattan's form of home rule in his youth.

In 1839 Guinness assisted his nephew John in establishing a short-lived brewery in Bristol.

By his death in 1855, St James's Gate was brewing and selling 78,000 hogsheads annually, equivalent to 4,212,000 gallons. Of these, 42,000 hogsheads were exported, mainly to the British market.

== Philanthropy ==
He supported, as trustee or sponsor, the:

- Meath Street Savings Bank;
- Catholic Association 1823–29;
- Society for Improving the Condition of the Poor
- Hibernian Bible Society
- The Meath Hospital
- Bethesda Locks Penitentiary, Dorset St, both Arthur and his wife served on the Governing Committee
- He was also a subscriber to Nelson's Pillar, built from 1808 to 1809.

His religious views appear to have been Low church Anglican.

== Banking career ==
Due to the halving of brewery sales in 1815–20 down to a million gallons a year, the partnership relied on profits from its flour mills during the Post-Napoleonic depression. The mills had burnt down in 1806, were rebuilt and leased from 1828, and were sold in 1838.

Arthur had also become interested in banking and was appointed to the "Court of Directors" of the Bank of Ireland between 1804 and 1847, eventually becoming its Governor in 1820–22. The bank's headquarters were the former Irish Houses of Parliament. In 1825 Arthur sought unsuccessfully to remove the bar on Catholics being chosen as directors of the bank.

He was also chairman of the Dublin Chamber of Commerce, elected unanimously from 1826 to 1855, and was a member of the Ouzel Galley Society that provided arbitration in business disputes. He was elected a member of Dublin Corporation; of the Dublin Brewers' Guild; and of the Royal Dublin Society in 1802.

Despite the drop in Dublin's commerce caused by the Act of Union of 1801, the Napoleonic Wars and the post-war depression, the removal of the former aristocracy to London, and the difficult and deflationary currency union of 1818–26 between the old Irish pound and the pound sterling, Guinness persevered in banking. As a result of his networking he was one of the Dubliners chosen to greet George IV on his visit to the city in 1821.

== Marriages ==
Arms of Lee Guinness: Quarterly, 1st and 4th, Per saltire Gules and Azure a Lion rampant Or on a Chief Ermine a Dexter Hand couped at the wrist of the first (for Guinness); 2nd and 3rd, Argent on a Fess between three Crescents Sable a Trefoil slipped Or (for Lee)

Guinness married Anne Lee at St. Mary's Church, Dublin on 7 May 1793. His wife Anne (1774–1817) was a daughter of the Dublin builder and brickmaker Benjamin Lee and his wife, Susanna Smyth. They had nine children, including:

- Revd. William S. Guinness (1795–1864), clergyman
- Arthur Lee Guinness (1797–1863), art collector and brewer until 1839
- Sir Benjamin Lee Guinness, 1st Baronet (1798–1868), brewer and MP
- Susanna Guinness (1804–36); married the Revd John Darley
- Elizabeth Guinness (1813–1897); married Revd William Jameson
- Rebecca Guinness (1814–70); married Sir Edmund Waller (1797–1851)

Arthur remarried, to Maria Barker, in 1821; they had no children.

In 1804 his brother Benjamin married Rebecca Lee, Anne's sister. Their daughter Susan married Arthur's eldest son, Revd. William S. Guinness, in 1826.

In 1814, Arthur joined his brother Hosea in applying for a grant to use the arms of the Gaelic Magennis clan from County Down, as their father had used them from 1761. The Deputy Herald Sir William Betham refused the same arms but granted similar arms that were recoloured. Arthur impaled the arms of his wife's family, the Lees.

=== Business succession ===
The late 1830s was a time of transition. The family flour mill in Kilmainham was sold in 1838 on the passing of the Bread (Ireland) Act. The partnerships with his brothers had ended by 1840; his eldest son was a clergyman; and his second son, the third Arthur Guinness, had resigned in 1839 due to a brief affair with Dion Boucicault who was working as a clerk at the brewery.

Thereafter his third son Benjamin managed the brewery from 1839 with the Purser family, with Arthur, by now aged 70, involved only with the larger decisions. On Arthur's death in 1855 Benjamin became sole owner of the business. In turn, his third son Edward would become the sole owner from 1876.

== Political views ==
Arthur supported Catholic emancipation from at least the 1790s, but not the Society of United Irishmen. On the approach to the 1798 rebellion he deplored both official and rebel violence, and assumed that the solution would be Catholic emancipation with universal suffrage. In a 1797 speech in Dublin he regretted:

"... the strong measures at present adopted for the suppression and prevention of tumult and disorder", and he suggested: "The things most likely to produce this most desirable end are the total removal of the remaining barriers between us and our Roman Catholic brethren and a constitutional reform in the representation of the people in Parliament."

The Dublin Catholic Board commented in 1813 that he and his brothers were: "..entitled to the confidence, gratitude and thanks of the Catholics of Ireland". In 1819 he is mentioned in a group of supporters visiting Henry Grattan.

He was elected to Dublin Corporation arising from his selection as one of the four members sent by the Dublin Brewers' Guild, under the old elective system that was reformed by the Municipal Corporations (Ireland) Act 1840. He did not want to stand for election to the House of Commons, explaining to his son Benjamin that:

"... The office of sitting in parliament for a great city, and especially such a city as Dublin, where party and sectarian strife so signally abound, and more especially if filled by one engaged in our line of business, is fraught with difficulty and danger."

In 1829 he helped raise £30,000 for Daniel O'Connell at the time of Catholic emancipation when he took his seat in the House of Commons. In May 1831 he spoke at a meeting campaigning for what became the Reform Act 1832, saying:

"A great change was taking place all over the world. Men were awakening. Reason and intelligence were on their majestic way, and everywhere the good principle was beginning to be asserted that Governments were instituted for the benefit of the people.. ".

His early support for Daniel O'Connell changed during the 1837 election when Arthur voted for the conservatives (then a public act), and from now on he opposed O'Connell's proposals to repeal the Act of Union. In his 1837 victory speech O'Connell commented dismissively that:

"I thought they had a better spirit; but at all events, they have now the recollection of their conduct without the consolation of having inflicted any real injury. With contemptuous pity I dismiss the Guinnesses".

O'Connell then editorialised with regret in his journal, The Pilot that Arthur:

"..never committed but this one error.. who is known to be.. a friend of civil and religious liberty, and a foe to.. corruption and Orange domination".

This opposition was inflamed by O'Connell's son Daniel junior being given the neighbouring Phoenix brewery to run from 1831, despite his lack of experience, which had failed within a few years. But from the late 1830s the O'Connells lost all interest in brewing when Father Mathew started his temperance crusade. By 1839 O'Connell was describing Arthur in a private letter as a: "miserable old apostate".

During the Great Famine of the 1840s, Arthur called on his son Benjamin to donate to the starving, adding that:

"..my purse is open to the call." How much was donated is unknown.

The conservative Second Peel ministry of 1841–46 had organized some deliveries of food in late 1845.

== Retirement and death ==
Having established a huge growth in exports Arthur retired to Torquay in the 1840s, with occasional visits to Dublin. He died at Beaumont in 1855, aged 87, and was buried at Mount Jerome Cemetery. His funeral procession was attended by "mutes bearing wands and mourning badges". His net estate at probate was valued at £180,000.

== Reference books ==
- Hall, FG; The Bank of Ireland 1783–1946. Hodges Figgis (Dublin) and Blackwell's (Oxford) 1948.
- Martelli G. Man of his time. London 1957
- Lynch P. & Vaizey J; Guinness's Brewery in the Irish Economy 1759–1876. Cambridge University Press 1960.
- Wilson D. Dark and Light Weidenfeld & Nicolson, London 1998
- Hughes D; A Bottle of Guinness Please": The Colourful History of Guinness. Phimboy 2006.
- Guinness P: Arthur's Round Peter Owen, London 2008.
- Joyce J.; The Guinnesses Poolbeg Press, Dublin 2009.
