= Charles Cooper Johnson =

British Indian Army officer (1827–1905)

Sir Charles Johnson
- Born: Charles Cooper Johnson; 20 December 1827; Bath, Somerset, England
- Died: 7 December 1905 (aged 77) Upton-upon-Severn, Worcestershire
- Allegiance: United Kingdom
- Branch: British Indian Army
- Rank: General
- Awards: Knight Grand Cross of the Order of the Bath

General Sir Charles Cooper Johnson GCB (20 December 1827 – 7 December 1905) was a senior British Indian Army officer.

Johnson was the sixth son of Sir Henry Johnson, 2nd Baronet, and Charlotte Elizabeth Philipse, daughter of Frederick Philipse and Henrietta Griffiths. He was a grandson of Sir Henry Johnson, 1st Baronet and great-grandson of Frederick Philipse III of New York. He was educated at the East India Company Military Seminary in Addiscombe.

He was commissioned into the 33rd Bengal Native Infantry. He later transferred into the Bengal Staff Corps, which was amalgamated into the Indian Staff Corps in 1861. He was promoted to Major on 7 June 1864. In 1877, while holding the rank of Colonel, he was made a Companion of the Order of the Bath. He was promoted to the rank of full General on 1 April 1894. Johnson was made Knight Grand Cross of the Order of the Bath (GCB) in the 1900 Birthday Honours.

== Family ==
Johnson married on 4 January 1860 Jemima Anne Frances Martin (d 18 July 1920), daughter of Rev George Martin by Lady Charlotte Sophia Eliot, second daughter of the 2nd Earl of Saint Germans. They had five sons:

- Hon. Brig.-Gen. Charles Edward (4 August 1861 – 20 August 1930), married in 1899 Susan Ellen (killed in the Bath Blitz, 27 April 1942), daughter of Col. Charles Henry Ewart
- Maj. Arthur Cyril Beaumont (21 January 1863 – 11 September 1904), married in 1901 Roberta Joanna, daughter of Robert Pottinger RN, Inspector-General of Hospitals and Fleets
- Hon. Brig.-Gen. Elliot Philipse CB (21 November 1866 – 26 November 1925), married in 1892 Mary, daughter of Surgn-Maj-Gen James Inkson; grandfather of Sir Robin Eliot Johnson, 7th Bt
- Percy Steward (bapt. 5 January 1869 – 4 July 1877), died in childhood
- Allen Victor DSO (20 August 1871 – 14 November 1939), married in 1919 Angela Mary, widow of Brig.-Gen. Paul Aloysius Kenna VC DSO and daughter of Hubert Aloysius Tichborne Hibbert
