= Mark Rainsford =

Irish brewer and politician

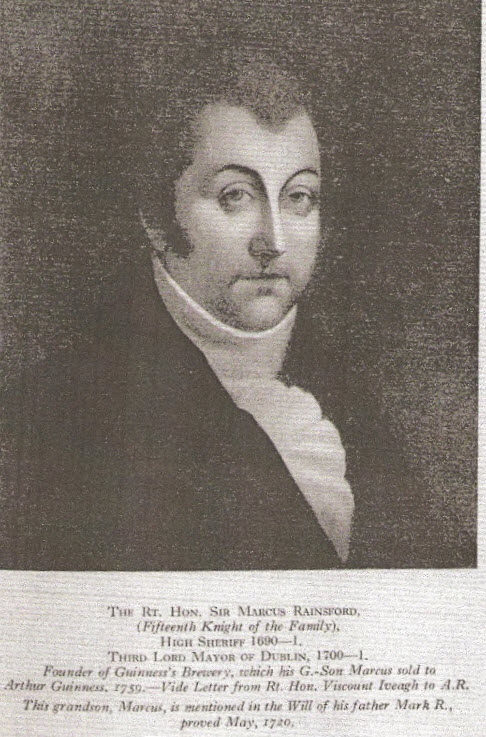
- Contemporary portrait of Rainsford
- Born: 1651 or 1652; Dublin, Ireland
- Died: November 1709 (aged 57); James's Street, Dublin, Ireland
- Resting place: St. James' Church, Dublin, Ireland
- Occupations: Brewer, businessman, politician
- Known for: Owner of what later became the Guinness Brewery

Sir Mark Rainsford (c. 1652 – November 1709) was an Irish businessman and politician; and the owner of what was to later become the Guinness Brewery.

== Political career ==
Rainsford was Lord Mayor of Dublin from 1700 to 1701. During his term as Lord Mayor, the King William III equestrian statue in College Green, Dublin was unveiled on 1 July 1701. He had previously served as High Sheriff of Dublin City in 1689 and 1690.

== Business career ==
Rainsford was the owner of what would later become the Guinness Brewery in St. James's Gate, Dublin. His business manufactured 'Beer and Fine Ales' and he was succeeded by his son - also named Mark Rainsford. In 1715, the business was leased to Captain Paul Espinasse. By 1750, the Rainsford family had resumed possession of the business and site. Rainsford's grandson, also called Mark Rainsford, signed over the now famous 9000 year lease to Arthur Guinness on 31 December 1759.

== Personal life ==
Rainsford was married twice; His first wife was Jane Mee, the daughter of Giles Mee. He had three sons and several daughters. He acquired land in Portarlington in Queen's County (later County Laois) as well as plantations in County Kildare and County Kilkenny.

In 1691, upon the death of his father-in-law, Giles Mee, Rainsford inherited water rights in the district around St. James's Gate and leveraged these rights to undertake his brewing business.

Rainsford was married for a second time, to Isabella Bolton, on 16 May 1695 in St. Michan's Church Dublin. He died in November 1709, and Rainsford Street (which stands at the junction of Crane Street and the entrance to Guinness Brewery) was named in his honour.

== Images ==
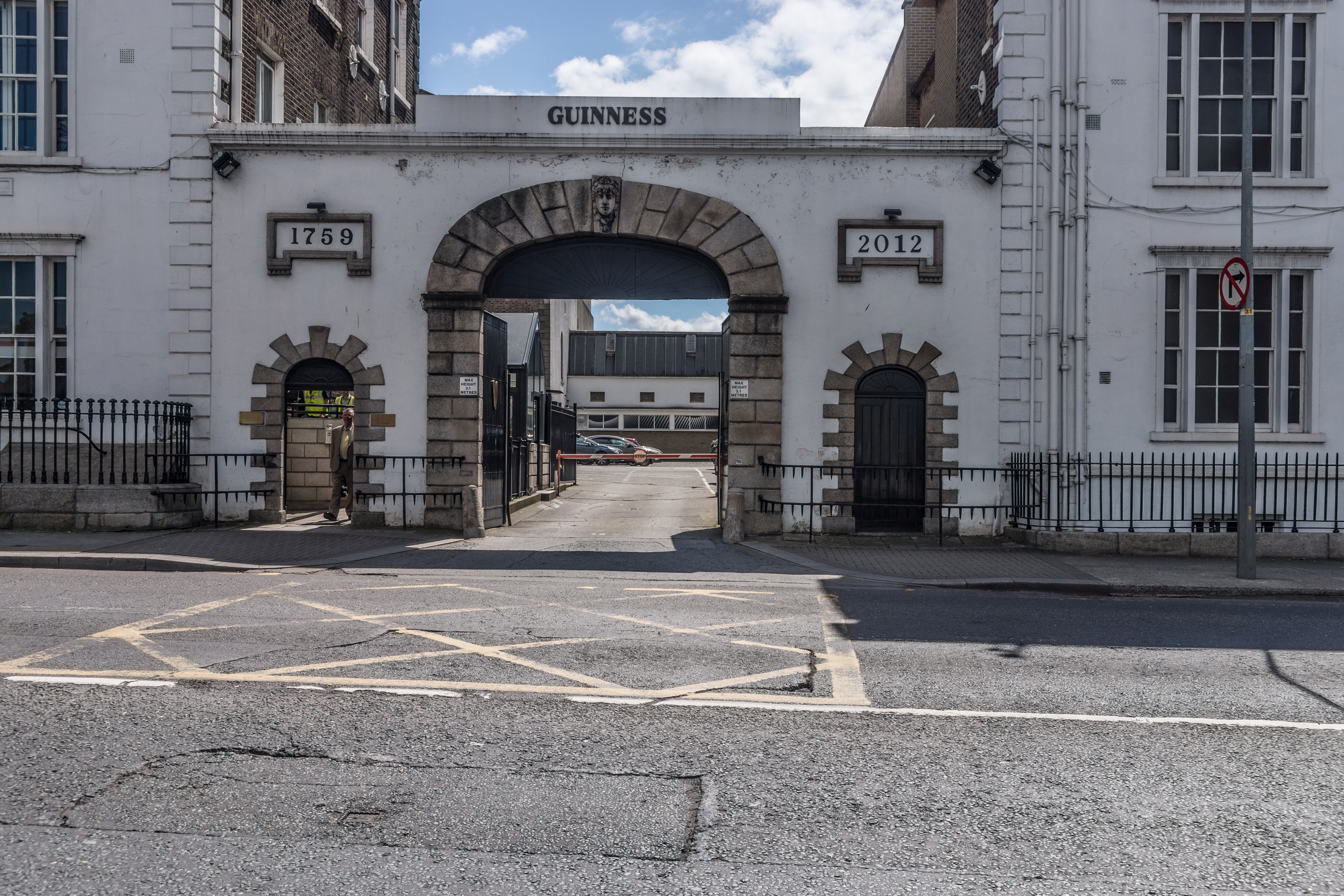
Thomas Street entrance to St James' Gate Brewery, the site of Rainsford's brewing business

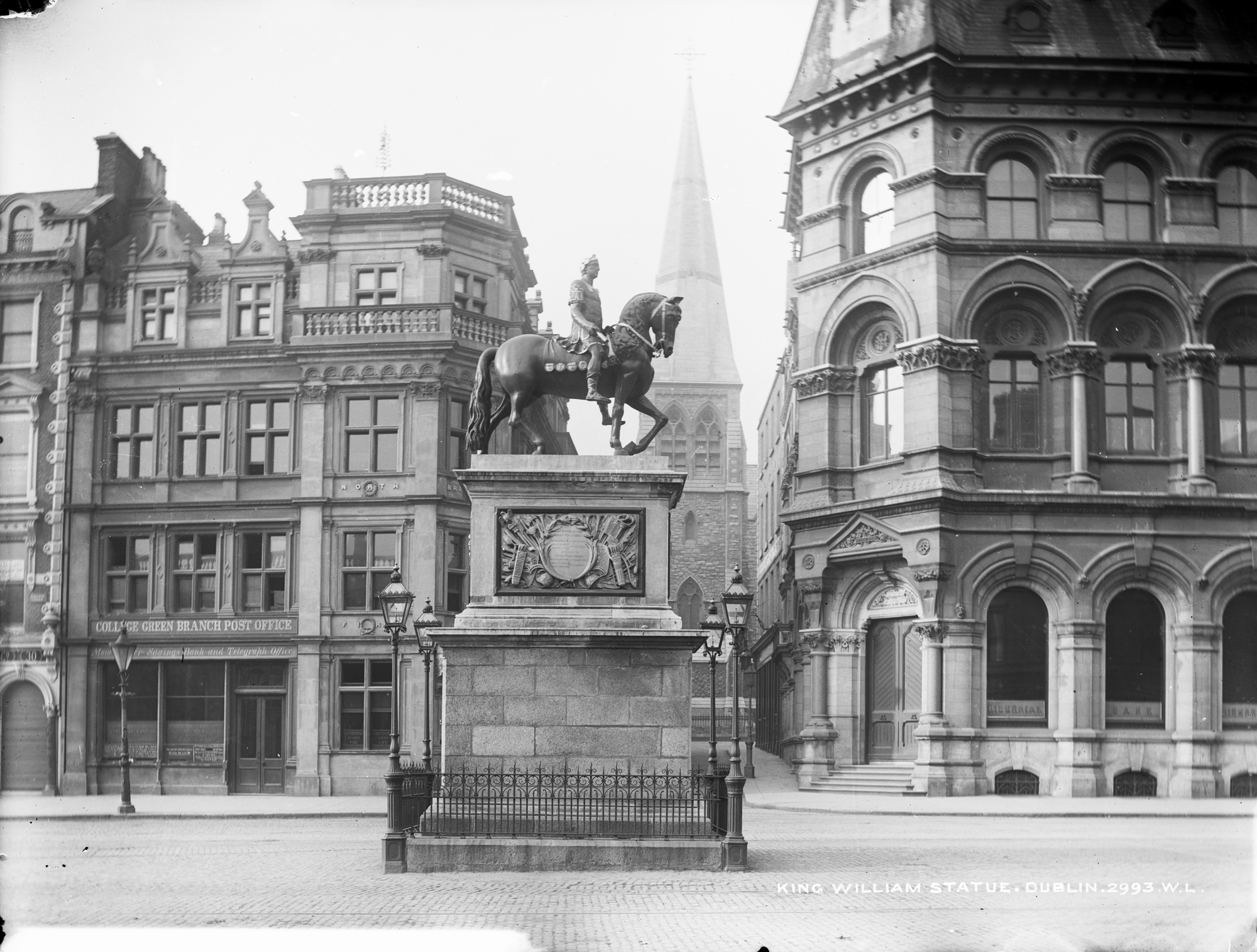
King William III statue, unveiled during Rainsford's tenure as Lord Mayor

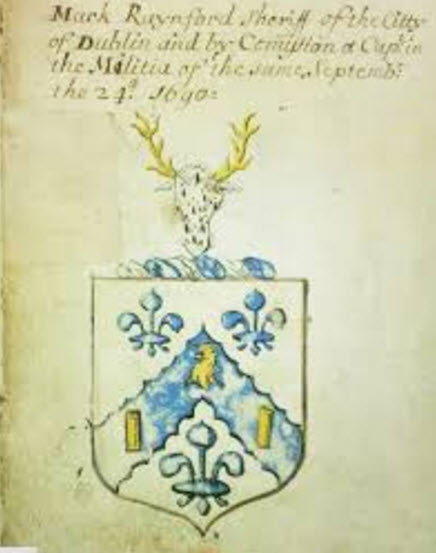
Arms entry of Mark Raynford, Sheriff of City of Dublin, a Captain of Dublin Militia, 24 September 1690

Civic offices
Preceded by Sir Anthony Percy	Lord Mayor of Dublin; 1700–1701	Succeeded by Samuel Walton
