= Ouzel Galley =

17th-century Irish merchant ship

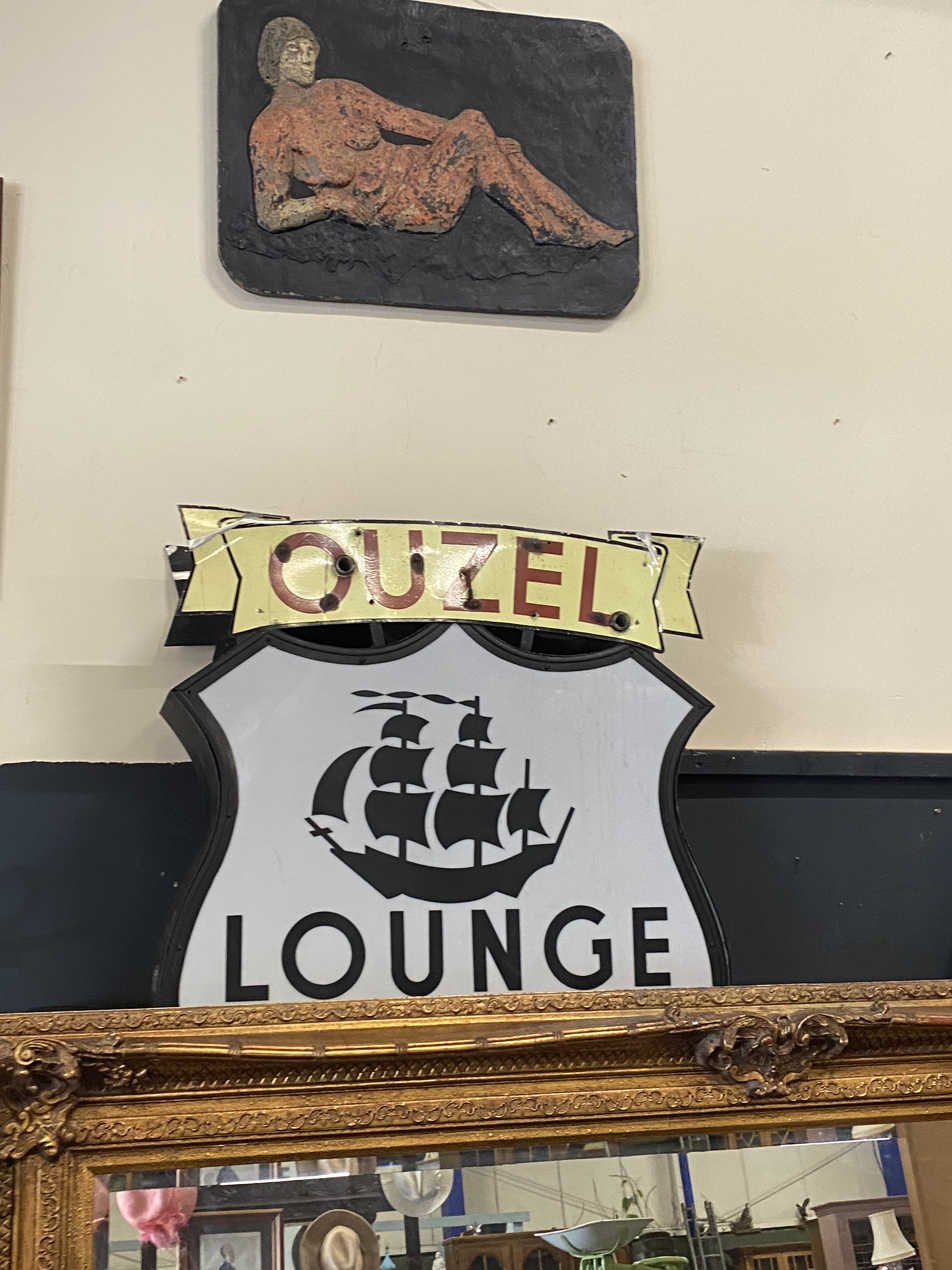
- Known for: Unexplained disappearance and reappearance of entire ship, crew and cargo after missing for two years

The Ouzel Galley was an Irish merchant ship that set sail from Dublin in the late seventeenth century and was presumed lost with all hands when she failed to return within the next three years. After a further two years had elapsed, however, she mysteriously reappeared with her full complement of crew and a valuable cargo of spices, exotic goods and, it is said, piratical spoils. The ship has entered Irish folklore, and her unexplained disappearance and unexpected reappearance are still the subject of a number of conspiracy theories.

== The story of the Ouzel ==
=== Disappearance ===
In the autumn of 1695 a merchant galley called the Ouzel (meaning blackbird) sailed out of Ringsend in Dublin under the command of Captain Eoghan Massey of Waterford. Her destination, it was supposed at the time, was the port of Smyrna in the Ottoman Empire (now İzmir in Turkey), where the vessel's owners – the Dublin shipping company of Ferris, Twigg and Cash – intended her to engage in a trading mission before returning to Dublin the following year. The Ouzel, however, did not return as scheduled; nor was she seen the year after that. When a third year passed without any sign of her or her crew, it was assumed by the people of Dublin that she had been lost at sea with all hands.

In 1698 a panel comprising the city's most eminent merchants was set up to settle the question of insurance. The panel's ruling was that the ship had indeed been lost and that its owners and insurers should receive their due compensation. The galley's complement of thirty-seven crew and three officers were declared dead and the insurance was paid out.

=== Reappearance ===
Two years later, however, in the autumn of 1700, the Ouzel made her unexpected reappearance, sailing up the River Liffey to scenes of both disbelief and jubilation. Captain Massey later described how the ship had fallen victim to Algerian corsairs on its outward journey. The crew were taken to North Africa, where they were forced to man the ship while their new masters engaged in acts of piracy against merchant vessels returning from the Caribbean or plying the lucrative Mediterranean shipping lanes. After five years of captivity, however, Massey and his men took advantage of a drunken carousal to free themselves and retake the Ouzel, which they then promptly sailed back to Dublin, its hold still full of the pirates' booty.

=== Rumours ===
Soon rumours began circulating around Dublin that the trading mission to Smyrna had been a blind all along and that it was Massey and his crew who had been engaged in piracy on the high seas. The tall story of Algerian corsairs and a five-year captivity in North Africa, not to mention the fortuitous escape of the entire crew, was considered too far-fetched to be true.

In the late eighteenth century it was illegal for Irish ships to trade in the West Indies, so it is possible that Smyrna was falsely declared as the ship's destination and Massey sailed to the Caribbean with every intention of trading honestly. In those days the West Indies was notorious for its piracy, and Irishmen are known to have engaged in the practice, both willingly and unwillingly.

Whatever the truth of the matter, the ownership of the Ouzel's cargo became a matter of dispute. As plunder, it could not be legally divided amongst the crew. The arbitration body which had settled the question of insurance in 1698 was reconvened to inquire into the matter. Later accounts recall how the panel decided that all monies remaining after the ship's owners and insurers had been properly compensated should be set aside as a fund for the alleviation of poverty among Dublin's "decayed merchants".

For several members of the crew this outcome only exacerbated the straitened circumstances in which they found themselves. Many had returned to Dublin only to discover that in their absence their wives had remarried, or their estates had been divided among their next-of-kin. It is even said that some of the returning shipmates found new children awaiting them at home. To this day in Ringsend, children born in unorthodox circumstances are referred to as "ouzelers".

== The Ouzel Galley in history and literature ==
No contemporary accounts of the Ouzel Galley's adventures survive. The earliest reliable reference is found in Warburton, Whitelaw and Walsh's History of Dublin (1818): "Early in the year 1700, the case of a ship in the port of Dublin excited much controversy and legal perplexity, without being drawn to a satisfactory conclusion."

In 1876 the story was made the subject of a novel by the prolific but little-known writer W. H. G. Kingston: The Ouzel Galley, or Notes From an Old Sea Dog. In this book, the Ouzel is indeed commandeered by pirates – but in the Caribbean, not North Africa. And when she returns to Dublin there is no booty in her hold. Kingston is known to have visited Dublin in 1856 and 1857, and was a cousin of Sir John K. James, a long-standing member of the Ouzel Galley Society, so it is quite possible that he was privy to "the secret history" of the vessel. Furthermore, Sir John died in 1875, one year before the appearance of Kingston's novel, which has led some historians to speculate that Kingston had agreed not to publish his account while Sir John was still alive precisely because his scandalous account contains much that is true.

In 1904 C. Litton Falkiner mentioned "piratical spoils" among the Ouzel's cargo in his Illustrations of Irish History and Topography.

James Joyce alludes to the Ouzel Galley in his final work Finnegans Wake (1939): "or carried of cloud from land of locust, in ouzel galley borne....”

In 1940 another novelisation of the story appeared by the Irish surgeon, George Aloysius Little. The Ouzel Galley does draw on earlier accounts of the ship, but it is as much a flight of fancy as it is an historical novel.

== The Ouzel Galley Society ==
In 1705 the panel of merchants which had arbitrated in the case of the Ouzel Galley was formally established as a permanent arbitration body to deal with similar shipping disputes that might arise. It was hoped that the new body could resolve such disputes without having recourse to the courts, which would have resulted in excessive legal fees. Not only did the Ouzel Galley Society take its name from the famous vessel, but its membership was also regulated to match that ship's complement of forty men. The society's members bore naval titles such as captain, coxswain, boatswain, etc., and were expected to pay an annual subscription for the upkeep of the society; fees charged for the society's arbitration work were donated to various worthy causes.

The members were generally drawn from among the city's most eminent politicians and businessmen – among them Arthur Guinness and John Jameson. For much of the eighteenth century the society met in public houses – "the Rose and Bottle or Phoenix Tavern or Power's Inn or Jude's Hotel", as James Joyce recounts in Finnegans Wake.

In 1783 the society was partially subsumed by the newly formed Dublin Chamber of Commerce, whose meetings generally took place in the Commercial Buildings on College Green. A stone plaque commemorating the society can still be seen above the doorway of No. 10, next door to the no longer extant Commercial Buildings.

The Ouzel Galley Society was eventually wound up in 1888.

A bar and restaurant named the Ouzel Galley Lounge later opened in the basement of the Commercial Buildings on Dame Street. The bar later closed in the 1970s with the development of Sam Stephenson's Central Bank of Ireland building.

=== Reconstitution ===
Precisely one century later, however, during Dublin's "millennium" celebrations in 1988, the Ouzel Galley Society was reconstituted, primarily as a charitable institution. The membership now comprises former presidents of the chamber of commerce and others who are deemed to have "made a significant contribution to the economy of the capital". In 2005 Mary Finan was elected as the society's first female captain.

== See also ==
- List of people who disappeared mysteriously at sea
