= George More-Molyneux =

George Hand More-Molyneux
- Born: 6 May 1851; Littleton, Surrey
- Died: 21 November 1903 (aged 52); Brighton
- Military career
- Allegiance: United Kingdom
- Branch: British Indian Army
- Service years: 1870–1903
- Rank: Major-General
- Units: 37th Dogras, Khyber Rifles
- Conflicts: Second Anglo-Afghan War, Suakin Expedition, Third Anglo-Burmese War, Tirah Campaign
- Awards: CB, DSO

Major-General George Hand More-Molyneux CB DSO (1851–1903) was a senior British Indian Army officer.

== Biography ==
Born in Littleton, Surrey on 6 May 1851, George More-Molyneux was the son of Lt.-Col. A. More-Molyneux, H.E.I.C., and grandson of J. More-Molyneux, of Loseley Park, Surrey. He was educated at the Royal Grammar School, Guildford, and Bedford Grammar School. He joined the 37th Dogras in 1870, and was Commander of the Khyber Rifles in Afghanistan during the Second Anglo-Afghan War, between 1878 and 1880. He took part in the Suakin Expedition in Sudan, between 1884 and 1885, and fought at the Battle of Hasheen, the Battle of Takdul, and at the Battle of Tamai. He fought in the Third Anglo-Burmese War, between 1885 and 1889, was British Military Attaché in St Petersburg, between 1890 and 1892, and commanded the 1st Bengal Infantry, between 1892 and 1893. He served during the Tirah Campaign on the North West Frontier, between 1897 and 1898, was Commander of Bundelkhand District, Agra, between 1898 and 1901, British Representative in Aden, in 1901, and Commander of Rohilkhand District, Uttar Pradesh, between 1901 and 1903.

Major General George More-Molyneux was invested as a Companion of the Order of the Bath in the 1900 Birthday Honours. He died in Brighton on 21 November 1903.
