= Mary Finan =

Irish businesswoman

Mary Finan (born 2 August 1944) is an Irish businesswoman who worked in public relations. She was the first woman to serve as president of the Dublin Chamber of Commerce, and served as the last chair of the RTÉ Authority.

== Life ==
Finan was born on 2 August 1944 in Loughglynn, County Roscommon. She was the eldest of the 7 children. Her father was John Finan, a local TD and Senator. The family moved to Dublin in 1951, first living in Ballsbridge and later Rathgar. She attended St Louis, Rathmines, going on to study French and English at University College Dublin (UCD). After receiving her degree in 1966, she worked as a presenter on RTÉ television for 3 years. She completed a master's degree at UCD, and then took up a job with Kenny's Advertising, leaving to work at Peter Owens advertising in 1968. She married Geoff Mackechnie on 1 January 1972. They have one daughter, Victoria, born in 1980.

Finan was the first woman to serve as president of the Dublin Chamber of Commerce in 1996. In 1999, Finan became the deputy chair of Ogilvy & Mather Group while also managing director Wilson Hartnell Public Relations, a position she held from 1983 having started with the company in 1971. Finan was a council member of the Dublin Docklands Development Authority and chair of the Economic and Social Research Institute from 2003 having served on the council from 1996.

She has served as a director of numerous companies and institutions including Canada Life Assurance (Ireland), the Gate Theatre, the Automobile Association, ICS Building Society, the Dublin City University Educational Trust, the UCD Clinton Institute for American Studies, the Irish Chamber Orchestra, Opera Ireland, the Tyrone Guthrie Centre at Annaghmakerrig, the Cheshire Foundation, and the Buildings of Ireland Charitable Trust. She also served as the last chair of the RTÉ Authority from 2006 until the body was reformed as the Broadcasting Authority of Ireland. In 2012 she completed the Advanced Leadership Fellowship Programme at Harvard University.

In 2011, Finan was awarded an honorary Doctor of Law Degree by the National University of Ireland. In 2015, she was given the Lifetime Achievement Award at IMAGE Businesswoman of the Year Awards, the second woman to receive the honour.
