= St. James's Gate =

Historic entrance to Dublin, Ireland

Coordinates: 53.343349°N 6.284617°W

St. James's Gate, located off the south quays of Dublin, on James's Street, was the western entrance to the city during the Middle Ages. During this time the gate was the traditional starting point for the Camino pilgrimage from Dublin to Santiago de Compostela in Galicia (Spain). Though the original medieval gate was demolished in 1734, the gate gave its name to the area in which it was located, and in particular to the St. James's Gate Brewery (which was taken over by Arthur Guinness in 1759).

== Medieval city gate ==
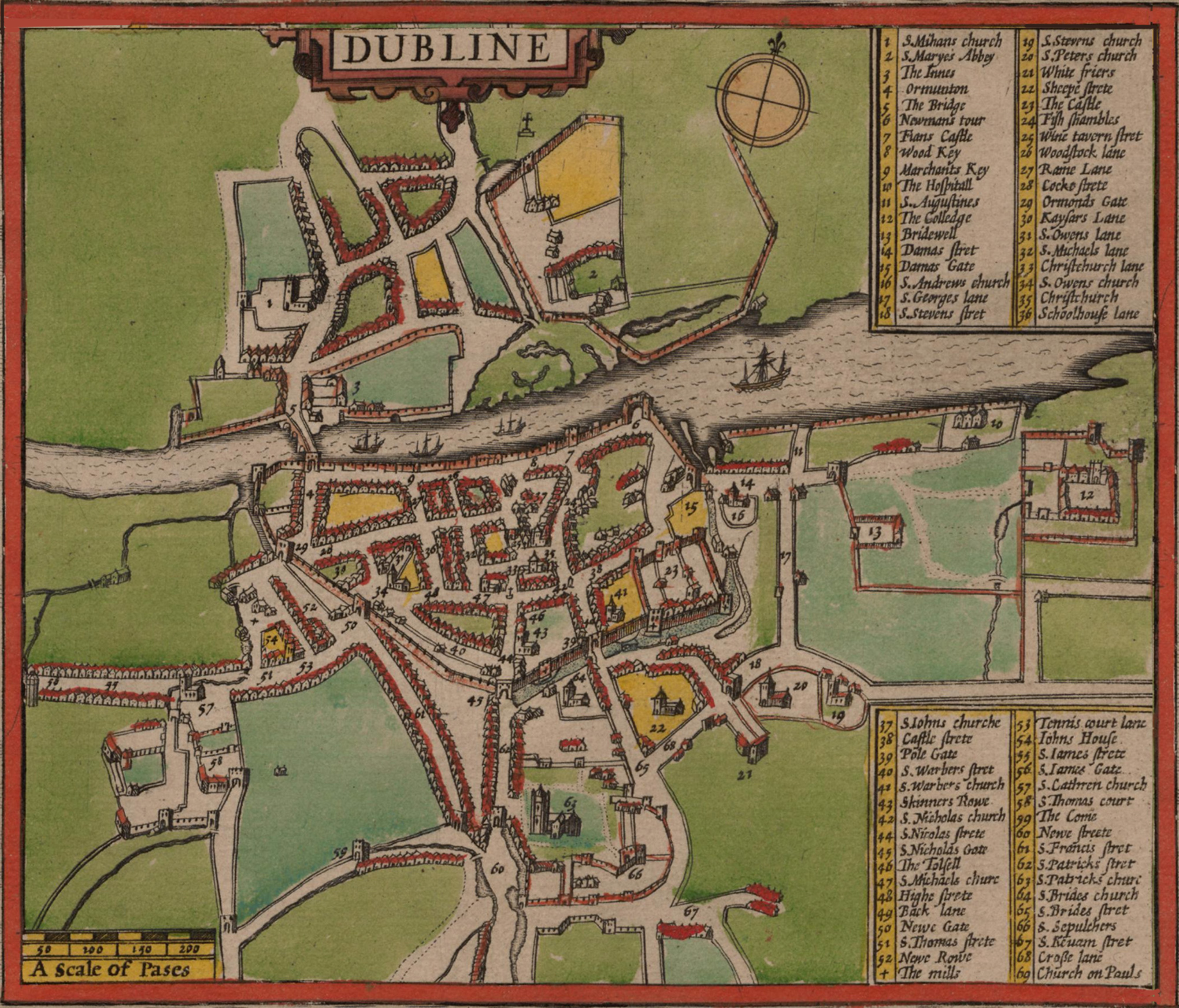
St. James's Gate (#56) is the westernmost landmark on Speed's 1610 map of Dublin

As a walled city, the main entrances to Dublin were protected by city gates. St. James's Gate was the city's western entrance, and was named for the 12th century church and parish of St. James. Also named for St. James, a holy well in the area was the location of a longstanding summer festival.

Standing for up to 5 centuries, the gate was a toll point for goods entering the city. It is referenced in 13th-century texts, is marked on John Speed's 17th-century map of Dublin, and on Charles Brooking's early 18th-century map of the city. Dilapidated by time, the medieval gate was demolished by the mid-18th century.

== Brewing in the area ==
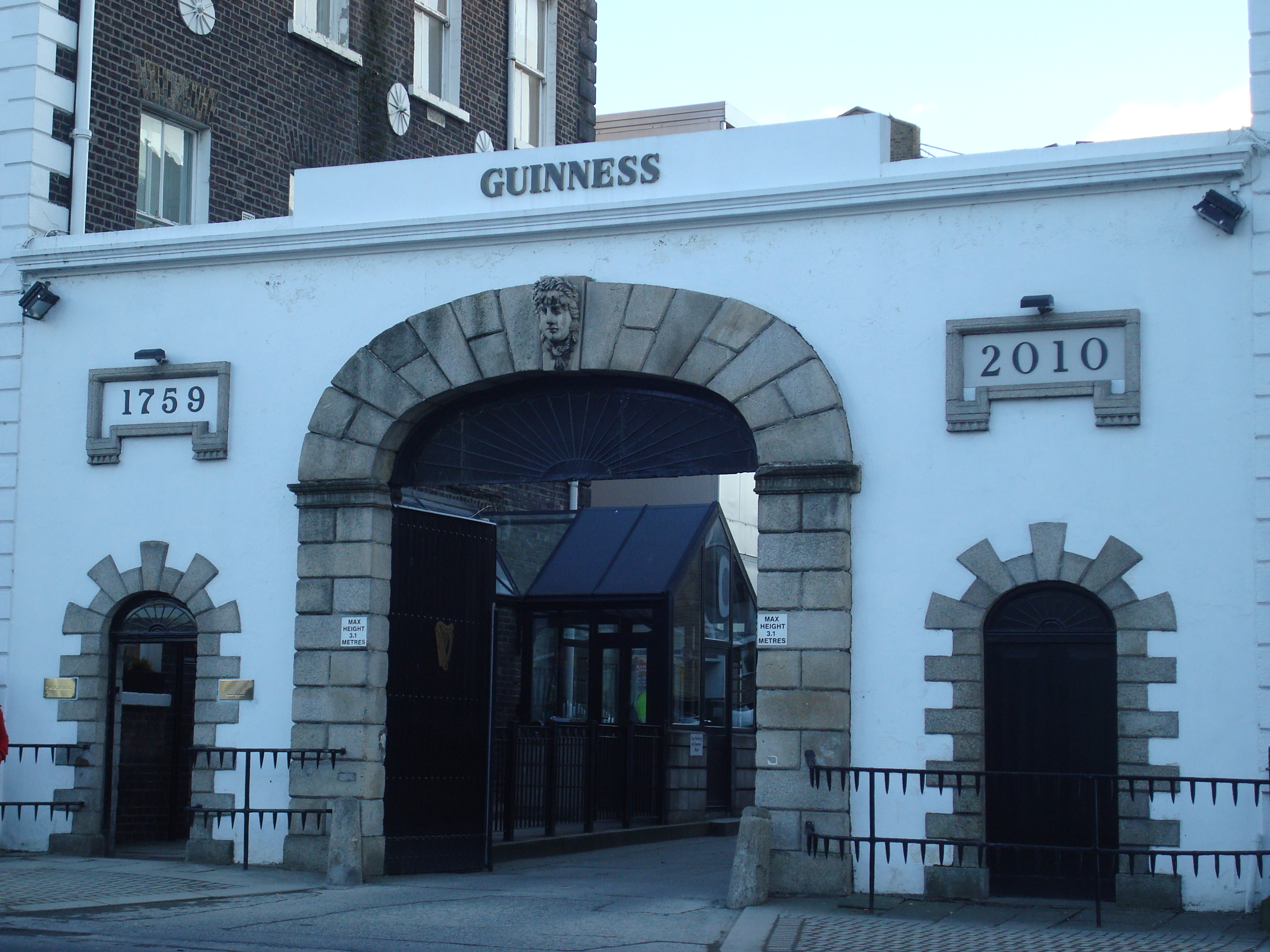
One of the entrances to the St. James's Gate Brewery

The St James's area has been associated with the brewing trade since the 17th century. A number of breweries had been established in Dublin up to the mid-17th century – one such brewery established by Alderman Giles Mee at St. James's gate around 1670. Giles Mee was given a lease to the water rights at St James's Gate (called "The Pipes") by Dublin Corporation. These rights passed to his son-in-law, Sir Mark Rainsford, a city alderman who was Mayor of Dublin between 1700 and 1701. Rainsford leveraged these water rights and, according to deeds from 1693, was producing "beer and fine ales" from St. James's Gate. There were also other brewers in and around St. James's Gate (owing to the water supply available in the area), and Rainsford's enterprise was not significantly different from the others. (Beer and ale were commodity products at the time as they were more commonly consumed than water – which contained contaminants that were removed in brewing.)

Sir Mark Rainsford died in 1709, and the lease passed to his son – also Mark Rainsford Esq. In 1715, the Rainsfords put the premises up for lease and it was taken by Captain Paul Espinasse. Espinasse reputedly had a role in the demolition of the original medieval gate – to ease access to the site and the city. Espinasse died in a fall from his horse near the Black Bull Inn at Drogheda in 1750.

For ten years the brewery site was on the market, and by 1759 the lease was in the hands of a third Mark Rainsford, the grandson of Sir Mark Rainsford. Arthur Guinness was interested in the premises, and on 31 December 1759, the lease was signed over to Guinness for 9,000 years at £45 per year. The site has been the location of the Guinness brewery ever since. Guinness has expanded well beyond the original 4-acre lot, and has consequently bought out the property, rendering the 9,000-year lease from 1759 redundant.
