= Thomas Fraser (British Army officer) =

Major-General Sir Thomas Fraser KCB CMG
- Born: 1840
- Died: 1922 (aged 81–82)
- Allegiance: United Kingdom
- Branch: British Army
- Rank: Major-General
- Commands: Colonel Commandant of the Royal Engineers
- Awards: Knight Commander of the Order of the Bath; Companion of the Order of St Michael and St George

Major-General Sir Thomas Fraser KCB CMG (1840 – 1922) was a British Army officer.

== Life ==
Fraser was the eldest of four children of George Robbins Fraser, a barrister, and Elizabeth Allen Smythe. He was educated at Victoria College, Jersey and the Royal Military Academy, Woolwich, from where he was commissioned into the Royal Engineers in 1862. Following postings in France and Bulgaria, he served as the Political Secretary to Sir Evelyn Wood during the First Boer War. For his service in this conflict he was made a Companion of the Order of St Michael and St George. He served in the Anglo-Egyptian War in 1882 and was twice mentioned in dispatches, and promoted to Major and then Lieutenant-Colonel while serving with the Egyptian Army. He was again mentioned in dispatches, promoted to full Colonel and appointed a Companion of the Order of the Bath, before a period of service in England. Fraser was knighted in the 1900 Birthday Honours and placed on retired pay in 1902.

In 1913, Fraser was appointed Colonel Commandant of the Royal Engineers with the rank of Major-General and served in this role during the First World War.

== Family ==
Fraser married Matilda Wildman in 1865, daughter of James Beckford Wildman.
