= William Wilson Mitchell =

British businessman (1840-1915)

Sir William Wilson Mitchell CMG
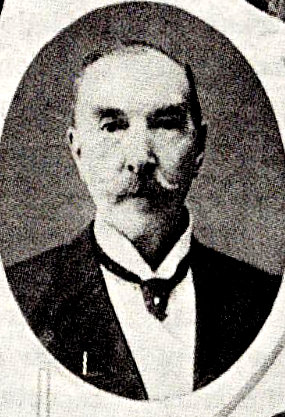
- Circa 1900
- Born: 22 February 1840; Edinburgh, Scotland
- Died: 15 December 1915 (aged 75); Colombo
- Occupation: Businessman
- Children: 5 daughters and 2 sons

Sir William Wilson Mitchell CMG (22 February 1840 – 15 December 1915) was a British trader and colonial administrator, who served on the Legislative Council of Ceylon.

== Early life and education ==
Mitchell was born on 22 February 1840 in Edinburgh, Scotland, the son of Grierson Mitchell and Margaret Wilson. He was educated at Edinburgh High School, and received his business training in Glasgow, Manchester and London.

== Career ==
In 1863, Mitchell went to Ceylon (now Sri Lanka) and the following year found employment at the firm of Darley, Butler & Co. Founded in 1848, the firm was mostly connected with coffee planting, but would later engage in general importation and many types of manufacturing, and tea planting. In 1874, he opened a branch at Tuticorin, Tamil Nadu, and began manufacturing cotton goods after acquiring a cotton pressing establishment. In 1884, Butler, a founding partner retired, Darley having died in 1871, and Mitchell became head of the firm.

During his 52 years as a trader in Ceylon he established and managed many successful businesses including Colombo Hotels Company, the New Colombo Ice Company, and the Wharf and Warehouse Company. He planted coffee and tea, exported tea to China, operated one of the largest drug companies in the East under the name of Colombo Apothecaries Company, and managed a firm of tailors and outfitters employing over 300 people. He introduced the cotton industry into the country when, in 1888, he established several large spinning mills at Wellawatte manufacturing all kinds of cotton goods for the local market.

Mitchell first became connected with the Chamber of Commerce in 1867, went on to serve as a member for 35 years, and was its first elected chairman. In 1871, he was nominated unofficial member of the Legislative Council of Ceylon, also serving from 1875 to 1878, 1881 to 1883, and 1887 to 1890. For many years, he was Chairman of the Colombo Harbour Board. Representing the mercantile community of Ceylon at Queen Victoria's Diamond Jubilee in 1897, he presented an address to her in person, and in 1900, he attended the Paris Exposition representing Ceylon's tea planters. Later that year he received a knighthood for public services to the colony.

== Personal life and death ==
Mitchell married Mary Hume Craven Smedley, daughter of a Colombo judge, and they had five daughters and two sons. He died in Colombo on 15 December 1915, aged 75.

== Honours ==
Mitchell was appointed Companion of the Order of St Michael and St George (CMG) in 1895 Birthday Honours. He was appointed a Knight Bachelor in the 1900 Birthday Honours.
