= Steyning Edgerley =

Sir Steyning William Edgerley, KCSI, KCVO, CIE (16 August 1857 – 1 May 1935) was a British administrator in India. A member of the Indian Civil Service, he held senior Secretariat appointments in the Government of Bombay.

== Biography ==
Educated at Shrewsbury School, Edgerley passed into the Indian Civil Service by examination in 1877, and spent his probation in 1877–1879 at Balliol College, Oxford. He went to India in 1879 and was engaged in district work in Sind. In 1888, he was appointed Under-Secretary in the Home Department of the Government of India, and thereafter spent most of his career at provincial headquarters.

Edgerley was private secretary to the Governor of Bombay (Lord Reay, Lord Harris, and Lord Sandhurst) from 1889 to 1895, when he was appointed a CIE. He was then selected by Lord Sandhurt to become Secretary to the Government of Bombay in the Political, Judicial, and Legislative Departments. In 1905, he became Chief Secretary to the Government of Bombay. In 1905, he was knighted a KCVO in connexion with his work on the Indian tour of the Prince and Princess of Wales.

In 1907, he was appointed Political and Judicial Member, Government of Bombay, but was soon after appointed to be a member of the Decentralization Commission under Sir Charles Hobhouse, coming to the notice of John Morley. In 1909, Morley appointed Edgerley to the Council of India, serving until 1916. At the same time, he was a Commissioner of Income-tax at the India Office. He was made a KCSI shortly before his retirement in 1916.

== Family ==
Edgerley married in 1898 Ethel Frances, née Pritchard (died 1912), daughter of the Bombay civilian Sir Charles Pritchard. They had a son and a daughter.
