= Dublin Chamber of Commerce =

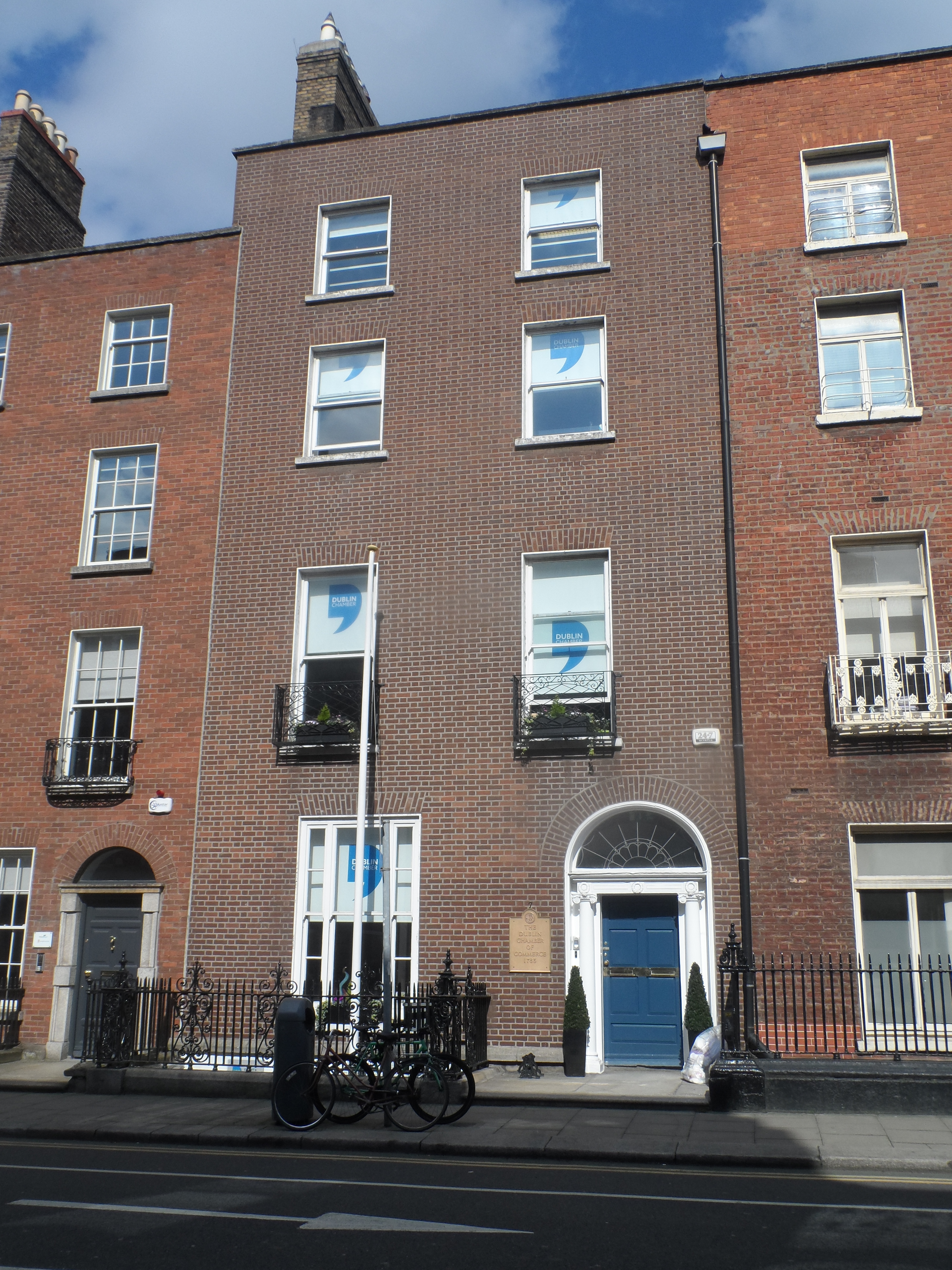
- Headquarters in Dublin
- Formation: 1783; 243 years ago
- Headquarters: 7 Clare Street, Dublin 2, Ireland
- President: Eoghan Quigley
- Website: www.dublinchamber.ie

Dublin Chamber of Commerce, also known as the Dublin Chamber, is the oldest chamber of commerce in Ireland. It was founded in 1783.

== Origins ==
The Dublin Chamber of Commerce was founded in 1783. It had been preceded by other collective bodies including the Guild of Merchants, which dated from the mediaeval period, and the Ouzel Galley Society, established at the beginning of the 18th century. Dublin Chamber's formation followed a weakening of the merchant guild system which left an opening for bodies which advocated free trade. Much of the focus of the organisation in its early years was on abolishing impositions and opposing restrictions on export trade. Travers Hartley served as the organisation's first president from 1783 to 1788.

A fountain at Croppies Memorial Park, Dublin which was funded by the Chamber in 1983 to mark their bicentenary

The creation of Dublin Chamber led to the formation of other chambers of commerce around Ireland, including Waterford (1787), Limerick (1805), Cork (1819), and Londonderry (1885). By 1819, there were 19 chambers of commerce operating in Britain and Ireland, and a federation, the Association of Chambers of Commerce, was created in 1860 to include the Irish chambers. Following independence, the chambers in Ireland became members of the Association of Irish Chambers of Commerce, a body now known as Chambers Ireland.

In 1996, Mary Finan was appointed president of the Dublin Chamber, the first woman to hold the position.

== Notable past presidents ==
Notable former presidents have included:

- Arthur Guinness II (1827–1855)
- Malcolm Inglis (1900–1902)
- Andrew Jameson (1921)
- Henry Morgan Dockrell (1933)
- Eddie Kelliher (1978)
- Mary Finan (1996)
