= Malcolm Inglis =

Scottish liberal unionist politician in Ireland

Sir John Malcolm Inglis DL (14 December 1837 – 24 April 1902) was a Scottish Liberal Unionist politician in Ireland and a prominent businessman.

== Business career ==
Inglis was born in Dunfermline, Fife, the son of William Inglis and Isabella Malcolm. He was educated in Dunfermline and Glasgow. He came to Dublin in 1859. The greater part of his career was passed in Dublin, where he was head of the firm Heiton and Co, iron and coal merchants and shipowners. He was for many years a member of the Port and Docks Board, and took an active part in the industrial development of Dublin.

He was president of the Dublin Chamber of Commerce from 1900 until his death in 1902 at Montrose, Donnybrook, County Dublin.

== Political career ==
Inglis was elected to the Blackrock town council in 1874. He was liberal, yet a prominent supporter of the union between Ireland and the rest of the United Kingdom. In 1885 he contested Kirkcaldy Burghs as an Independent Liberal, but lost to a fellow liberal, Sir George Campbell. The following year Inglis was among the Liberal Party members who broke away from the party to form the Liberal Unionist Party. He served several years as secretary to the Liberal Union of Ireland.

He was a Deputy Lieutenant for the city of Dublin, and a commissioner of national education for Ireland 1887–1902. He was knighted by Queen Victoria in 1900, during her visit to Ireland.

== Family ==
According to a family story, he was always known as John to the family, but when he was knighted he said "Sir Malcolm" sounded better. The same source states that he was originally offered a baronetcy, but declined this hereditary title as he did not find his eldest son worthy of it, and instead accepted a knighthood.

He married, in 1862, Caroline Johnstone, daughter of J. Johnstone. Among their children were Malcolm Inglis, and the engineer Sir Claude Cavendish Inglis (1883–1974).
