= Thomas Godfrey Carey =

Guernsey barrister

Sir Thomas Godfrey Carey (5 January 1832 – 6 November 1906) was a Guernsey barrister who served as Attorney-General of Guernsey, Bailiff of Guernsey, and President of the States of Guernsey.

He was born in Saint Peter Port to Havilland Carey and Augusta Dobree. He married firstly, Susan Elizabeth Slade, in 1859, and secondly, Eliza de Sausmarez Grassic, daughter of Thomas Ritchie Grassic, of Halifax, Nova Scotia in 1901.
