= Arthur Guinness =

Irish brewer (1725–1803)

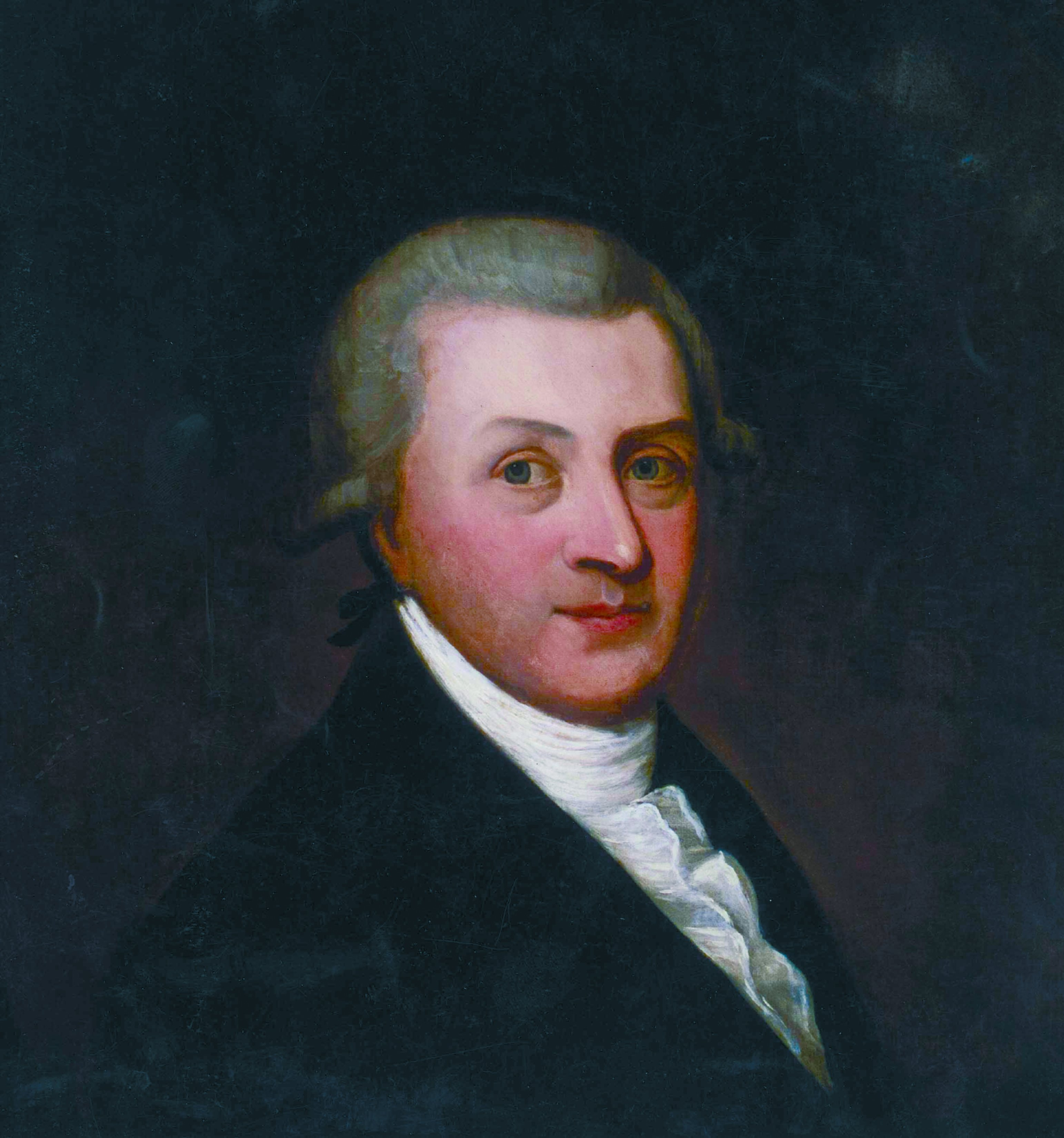
- Portrait of Guinness, dated 1759
- Born: 24 September 1725; Clonoughlis Celbridge, County Kildare, Ireland
- Died: 23 January 1803 (aged 77); Dublin, Ireland
- Resting place: Oughter Ard, County Kildare, Ireland
- Occupation: Brewer
- Years active: 1755−1799
- Known for: Founder of Guinness stout
- Spouse: Olivia Whitmore (m. 1761)
- Children: 10, including Arthur II
- Family: Guinness

Arthur Guinness (c. 24 September 1725 – 23 January 1803) was an Irish brewer, entrepreneur, and philanthropist. The inventor of Guinness stout, he founded the Guinness Brewery at St. James's Gate in 1759.

Guinness was born in Clonoughlis, Celbridge, County Kildare, in 1725. His father was employed by Arthur Price, a bishop of the Church of Ireland. Guinness himself was later employed by Price, and upon his death in 1752, both he and his father were bequeathed funds from Price's will. Guinness then worked at his stepmother's public house before founding a brewery in Leixlip. In 1759, during a financial crisis that created an abundance of affordable property, Guinness moved to Dublin and purchased an abandoned brewery from the Rainsford family. It was originally an ale brewery, but Guinness began producing porter in 1778, and by 1799, production of ale ceased with the popularity of his darker beer.

Outside of his brewery, Guinness was socially and politically active. A devout Protestant, he founded the first Sunday school in Dublin in 1786 and frequently argued for his fellow gentry to set a strong moral example. He was largely supportive of Catholic rights in Ireland but opposed the Irish Rebellion of 1798. As a member of the Dublin Corporation of Brewers, Guinness was also instrumental in petitioning the Irish House of Commons to change the tax code surrounding the importation of beer. Guinness and his wife had ten children together, and upon Guinness's death in 1803, his son Arthur Guinness II inherited the brewery and all operations.

== Early life ==
The Magennis coat of arms. During his lifetime, Guinness believed he was descended from this family, but 21st-century DNA evidence suggests otherwise.

Many of the details of Arthur Guinness's life and heritage are unknown or disputed by historians, either because insufficient written information exists or due to the proliferation of rumours by his contemporaries. During his life, Guinness believed that he was descended from the Magennises of Iveagh. While the Viscount Magennis, a Gaelic Catholic noble and supporter of James II of England, had fled Ireland for France after the Battle of the Boyne, he left behind a portion of the clan who converted to Protestantism and changed their name to Gennis. DNA testing run by Trinity College Dublin, however, suggests that Guinness's ancestors were actually another County Down family, the McCartans, who lived in a village called Guiness outside Ballynahinch. Similarly, little is known about Guinness's father, but most historical records place his date of birth around 1690 in County Kildare. A popular rumour in Guinness's day was that his father Richard was the illegitimate son of a couple who had fled Ireland after the Battle of the Boyne, leaving their young child at an orphanage in Leixlip. By contrast, Guinness's mother, Elizabeth Read, is known to be the daughter of a land owner in Clonoughlis, also in County Kildare.

Richard Guinness and Elizabeth Read married in the early 1720s, possibly in the parish church at Oughter Ard. While rumours at the time suggested that the couple had eloped while Guinness was working for Read's parents as a groom on their estate at Clonoughlis, this is historically unlikely, as the vicar would likely have refused to marry a couple without obtaining the bride's parents' permission. By 1722, Richard Guinness was in the employ of Arthur Price, a vicar in Celbridge.

Arthur Guinness was the first of five children born to Richard and Elizabeth. Likely born on his mother’s family estate Clonoughlis. Arthur was named for the vicar Arthur Price, who also served as his godfather. Guinness's exact date of birth is disputed by historians: while many sources suggest that he was born on 24 September 1725, the Guinness Company formally declared in 1991 that their founder's date of birth was on 28 September. His gravestone, meanwhile, states that he was 78 years old upon his death in January 1803, making it possible that he was born in 1724 rather than 1725.

In August 1742, Guinness's mother died at the age of 44, when her oldest son was 18. That same year, he followed his father into work for Price as a registrar. The occupation would have required Guinness to be literate, versed in arithmetic, and capable of writing, all opportunities that were rare for non-nobles. In 1744, Price was appointed Archbishop of Cashel, one of the most prestigious positions afforded to a clergyman in the Church of Ireland, and which came with a substantial pay raise that would have also extended to his staff. The Guinnesses remained in Price's employ until his death on 17 July 1752. Upon his death, he bequeathed his estate, valued at IR£8,850, to several relatives and employees, and both Guinness and his father received £100 apiece. On 19 October 1752, Richard Guinness married his second wife, Elizabeth Clare. Herself a widow, Clare had taken over the White Hart Inn upon her first husband's death, and Richard and his children worked at the public house after the wedding. Working for his stepmother was likely one of several places where Guinness learned how to brew.

Beer was of such great importance to Irish life in Guinness's time that, in addition to the many breweries on the island, homebrewing was popular among matriarchs, pub owners, and estate managers, and several members of Guinness's family engaged in the process. His maternal grandfather, William Read, had applied for a licence to sell ale in 1690, which he likely brewed himself and sold at a stall on the Dublin–Cork road. Working as a manager for Reverend Price's estate, Richard Guinness had a litany of his own responsibilities, most of which involved housekeeping and managing Price's funds. While it is frequently believed that Guinness had a hand in managing Price's brewery, this is unlikely, as the malt house in Oakley Park was listed as Jasper Carbery's property. This brewery was well known in Kildare for its porter, which had become a popular drink in the United Kingdom during Guinness's childhood.

== Guinness brewery ==
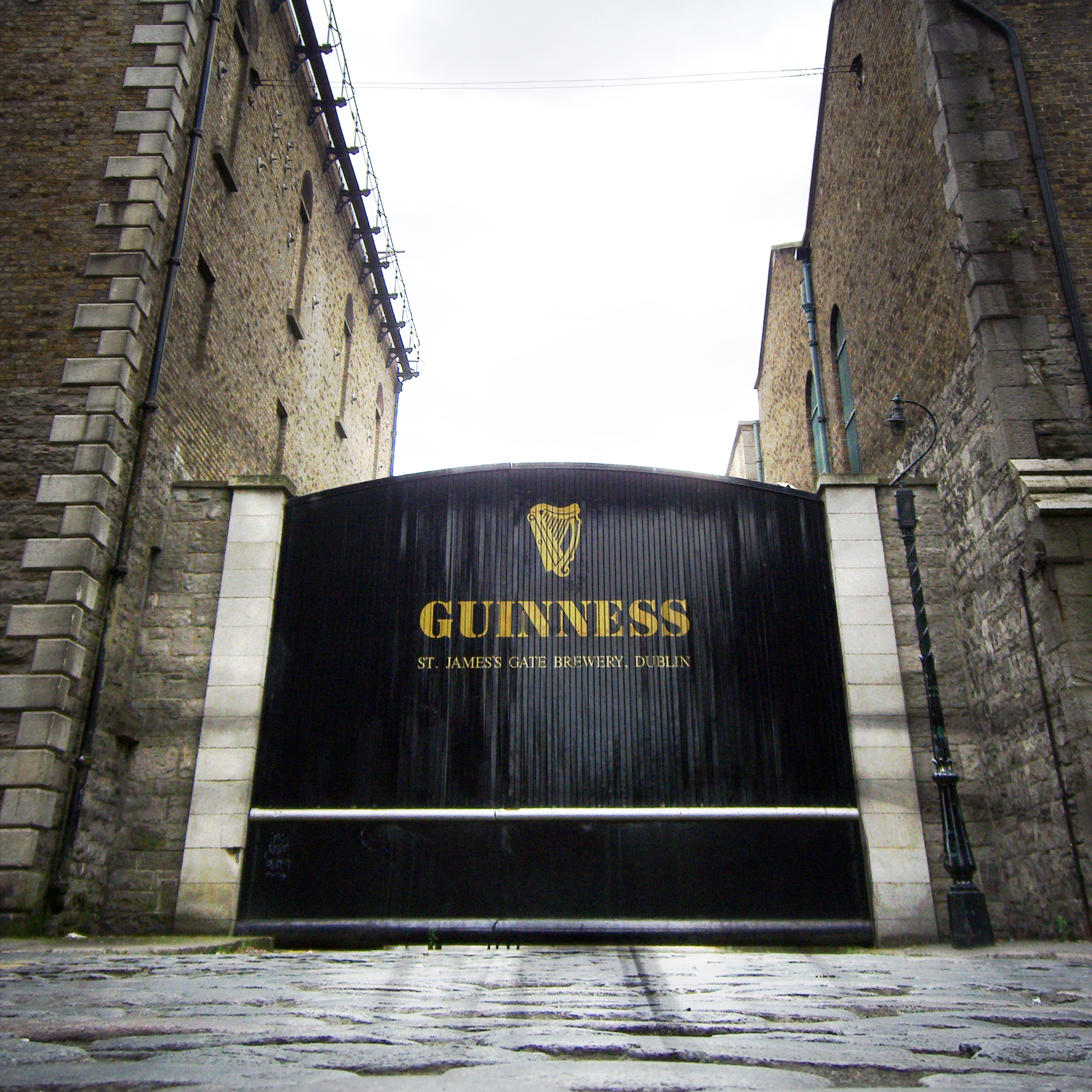
View of the Guinness Brewery at St. James's Gate

Guinness purchased his first brewery in Leixlip in 1755. This first brewery, which he acquired in September, was a three-story building that ran from the street to the River Liffey. The river provided him with easy access to water for brewing and for power, while barley was grown in neighbouring farms. Hops, meanwhile, could be easily brought from Dublin, as Leixlip sat along the main Dublin–Galway road. The origin of Guinness's yeast is unknown, but is likely from Kildare and possibly originated from the White Hart Inn. In September 1756, Guinness signed several more Leixlip leases, including a property owned by American businessman George Bryan.

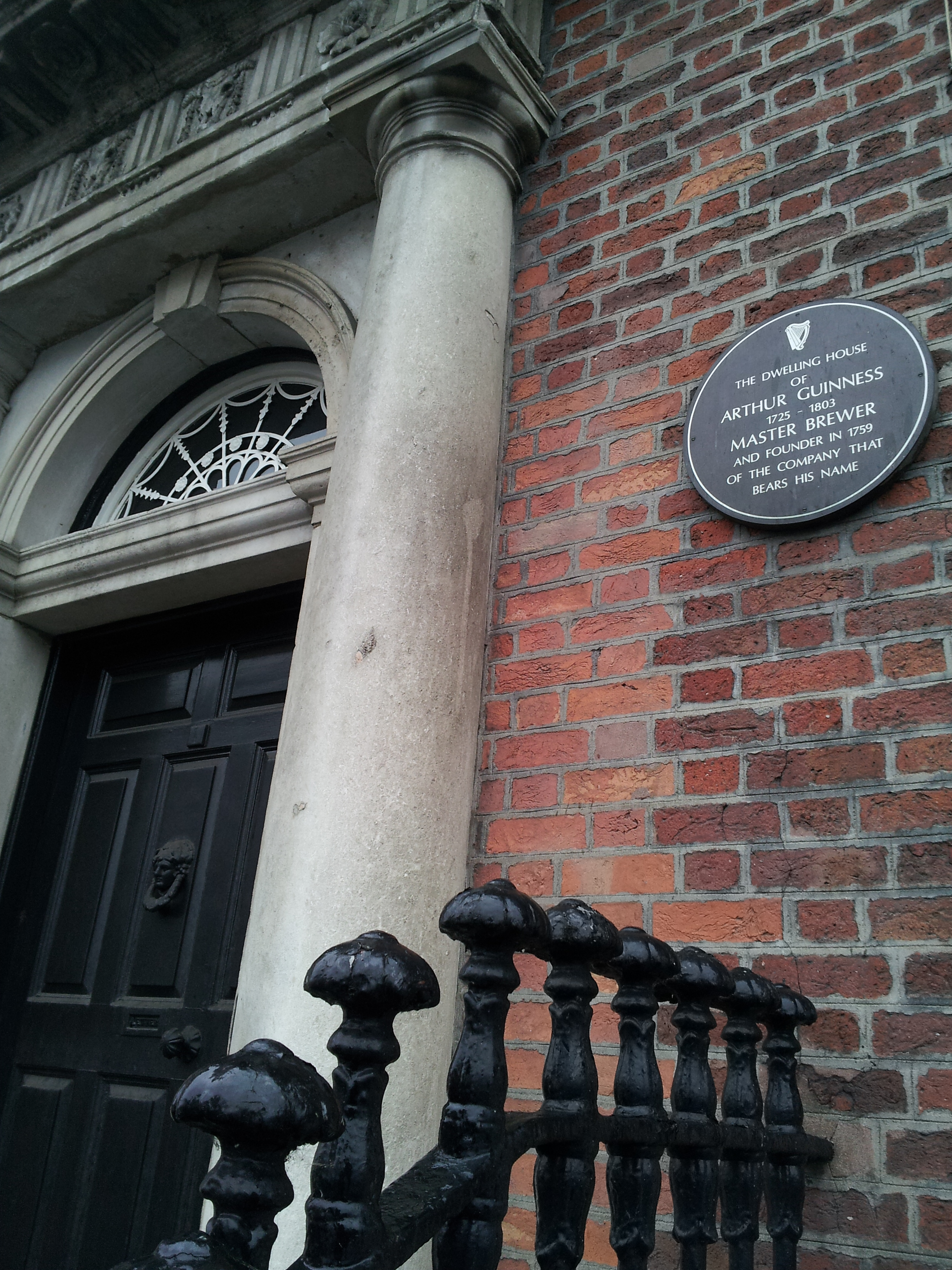
Guinness's house in Thomas Street, Dublin, with commemorative plaque

In 1759, Guinness moved to Dublin, leaving his Leixlip property in the care of his brother Richard. This move coincided with the Seven Years' War, which caused a number of economic upsets in Ireland, culminating in the collapse of several banks and a 1759 financial crisis that created an abundance of affordable property in Dublin. Guinness was interested in acquiring a brewery at St. James's Gate that had been abandoned nine years prior. The site was 4 acres (1.6 ha) and contained a brewhouse, a gristmill, two malt houses, and stables. The location was also economically advantageous, as Ireland was in the process of building its Grand Canal, which was intended to terminate just outside of St. James's Gate. Guinness leased the site from the Rainsford family on 31 December 1759. Under the agreement, he made a £100 downpayment and agreed to pay an additional £45 annually for 9,000 years.

One major conflict that dominated Guinness's early brewery career involved the terms of his lease as they related to water usage. The brewery's first owner, Giles Mee, had signed two separate leases with the Dublin Corporation: one for the property and one for the use of water. When the brewery fell into disuse in 1750, the water lease was forgotten. By 1773, the corporation had become angry with Guinness, claiming that his brewery was using more water than was afforded by his lease, while Guinness rebutted that the terms of the lease afforded him water "free of tax or pipe money". In April 1775, the corporation, who discovered that Guinness had made a number of alterations to his pipe system in order to draw more water onto his property, elected to physically cut off his supply. Guinness, in return, confronted the corporation with a pickaxe and threatened to dig his own channel. The properties agreed to settle the matter in court, and in 1785, Guinness agreed to lease his water from the City of Dublin for an annual charge of £10.

While he was immediately popular in Dublin, Guinness did not rise to immediate dominance among regional brewers. Tax information from 1766 indicates that he was still far outpaced by a number of rival brewers such as Taylor, Thwaites, and Phepoe. As a whole, the Dublin brewers were less economically successful than English brewers, whose imported porter was the dominant drink in the city. Guinness began tentatively adding porter to his ale-heavy brewery in 1778, and by 1783, it dominated his marketing, with Guinness telling a parliamentary committee, "a porter buys none but the best, as none else will answer". A memoranda book that Guinness kept in 1796 shows that porter production at the St. James's Gate brewery was by that time five times larger than his ale output. On 22 April 1799, Guinness formally brewed his last ale, forthwith declaring St. James's Gate a "porter brewery". Although he limited his brewery to dark beer, Guinness did experiment with different forms of porter. His concept of a "West India Porter", which utilised a greater hops and alcohol content to survive long overseas travel to the Caribbean, later became the basis for Guinness Foreign Extra Stout.

As a prominent figure within the Dublin brewery scene, as well as a member of the gentry following his marriage to Olivia Whitmore, Guinness became an agent for political change on behalf of Irish brewers. He served first as warden and later as master of the Dublin Corporation of Brewers, a position through which he would frequently argue on behalf of the brewing industry to the Irish Parliament. Of particular issue was the subject of the taxation of beer: in 1773, Guinness and fellow brewer George Thwaites petitioned the Irish House of Commons to change a restrictive taxation policy under which domestic Irish porter was taxed at a rate more than five times greater than beer imported from England. Four years later and amidst a greater crisis in British taxation policies caused by the American Revolutionary War, the House of Commons formally changed the tax code to no longer subsidise the Irish importation of English porter. This change created a market for the importation of Irish porter into England, and beer exportation soon became a staple of the Irish economy. Two years after the tax code was altered, Guinness became the official beer purveyor of Dublin Castle.

== Personal life ==
=== Family ===
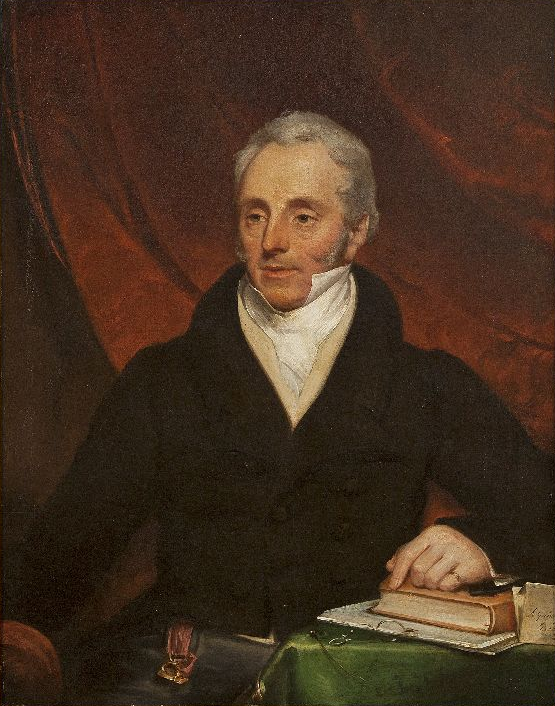
Upon his father's death, Arthur Guinness II took over brewery operations.

On 17 June 1761, Guinness married Olivia Whitmore, a younger woman from a wealthy and well-connected family who offered him a £1,000 dowry. Whitmore was a descendant of William of Wykeham and had several socio-politically prominent relatives. One of these was her cousin Henry Grattan, a member of the Parliament of Ireland who argued in favour of aiding Catholics and gaining legislative independence in Ireland. With Arthur, Olivia Guinness suffered 11 miscarriages but gave birth to ten children, all but one of whom, Olivia, survived into adulthood. These four daughters and six sons were named, from oldest to youngest, Elizabeth, Hosea, Arthur, Edward, Olivia, Benjamin, Louisa, John Grattan, William Lunell, and Mary Anne. Elizabeth was born on 28 February 1763; by the time of Mary Anne's birth in 1787, Elizabeth was already married.

Elizabeth Guinness married Frederick Darley in 1809, the same year that he became the Lord Mayor of Dublin. As Guinness's firstborn son, Hosea, born in 1765, was expected to inherit the family business, but he instead chose to enter the clergy. He was educated at Winchester College, the University of Oxford, and Trinity College Dublin before serving as the rector of St. Werburgh's Church, Dublin, until his death in 1841. Both Louisa and Mary Anne married into the clergy, wedding William Dean Hoare and John Burke, respectively.

Guinness's third child, also named Arthur, was born in 1768. Upon his father's death, he inherited the brewery at St. James's Gate, where he was assisted by his brothers Benjamin and William. In 1808, Benjamin and William became full partners in the company, which was renamed Guinness (A., Ben & W.L.) brewers. John Grattan Guinness, who had previously served in the East India Company, joined the brewery company as a sales agent in 1824, but left the position after his wife's death. When the younger Arthur died himself in 1855, his youngest son, named Benjamin after his uncle, took over brewery operations. Guinness's only economically unsuccessful child was Edward, who fell into debt after investing in a failed ironworks company. In 1811, a bankrupt Edward Guinness fled to the Isle of Man as protection from his debtors.

=== Politics and religion ===
Guinness was politically active throughout his life, both as a supporter of his cousin-in-law Henry Gratton and as a member of the Dublin Corporation. He was additionally a lifelong member and secretary of the Kildare Knot, a dining club made up of wealthy individuals regardless of religion. During his tenure, the Knot was involved with the Irish Volunteers, a patriotic militia group dedicated to defending Ireland from potential French invaders. Guinness's primary political positions, however, concerned the rights of Catholics to fully participate in Irish politics and society. In addition to personally hiring Catholics for his brewery, and by accounts treating them fairly, Guinness advocated to overturn laws that restricted the ability of Catholics to enter certain professions, and as a member of the Royal Dublin Society, he argued for economic developments that would positively affect lower-class Catholics in agriculture and domestic industry. He was opposed, however, to the Irish Rebellion of 1798, a rebellion of Presbyterian radicals who wished to overthrow British rule in Ireland. Guinness disliked both the economic disruption that the rebellion brought, as well as the violence. His son John was wounded in the fighting, further incurring the Guinness family's disapproval. Guinness's opposition to the rebellion garnered the ire of Irish Catholics and nationalists, who subsequently referred to his beer as his "black Protestant porter".

Guinness was a deeply religious man whose personal motto was Spes Mea in Deo, Latin for "My Hope is in God". Although he never converted to Methodism during his life, instead remaining a member of the Church of Ireland, his diaries indicate that his faith was influenced by that of John Wesley and the Methodist model of evangelical social work. He served as treasurer and later Governor of Meath Hospital and frequently donated money to St Patrick's Cathedral, Dublin. Another religious inspiration for Guinness was Robert Raikes, who promoted Sunday school as a method of eliminating crime by introducing faith and morals early in life. In 1786, Guinness opened the first Sunday school in Dublin.

Many of Guinness's social positions were based on his beliefs of temperance and moderation. He believed that the duty of the wealthy and powerful was to set a strong moral example for their citizenry and looked unfavourably at what he viewed as displays of excess. He once protested the traditional feast of a new alderman, worried that the occasion would lead to drunken impropriety, and instead suggested that the money set aside for the banquet be donated to The King's Hospital. Guinness's investment in penal reform similarly stemmed from his displeasure towards what he believed was excess punishment towards criminals. He was particularly opposed to the culture of duelling among the Irish elite, which he viewed as a deadly sport masquerading as honour, but his efforts to eliminate or reduce duelling were unsuccessful. Despite his generally temperate positions, Guinness never ventured into the teetotalism movement, instead joining the belief of his fellow brewers that drunkenness was attributed to liquor, not to beer.

== Later life and death ==
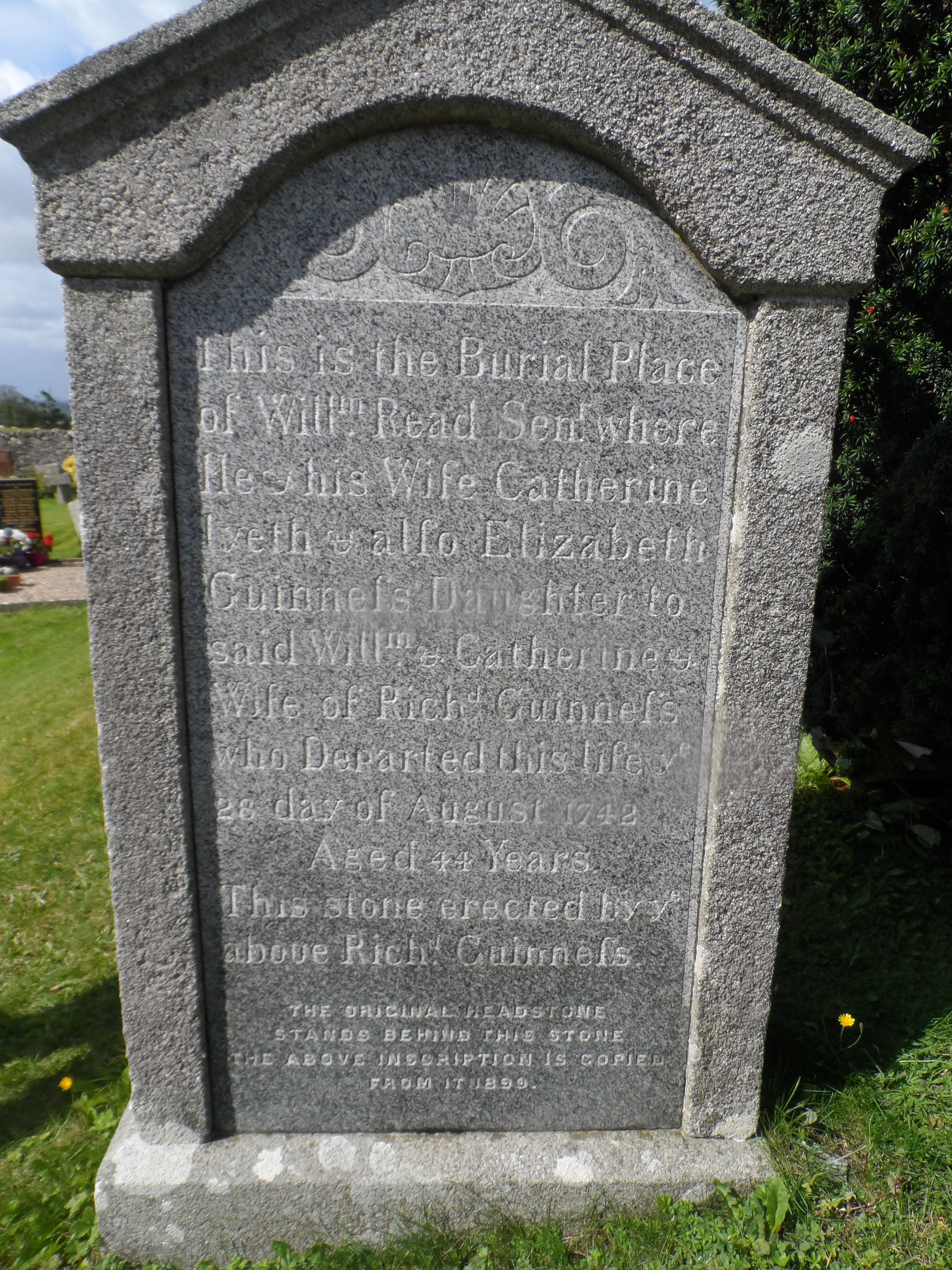
Guinness was buried in Oughter Ard next to his mother, whose gravestone is pictured here.

The Guinnesses moved into Beaumont House, an estate located north of Dublin, in 1764. He continued to expand and renovate the brewery throughout his life: by 1790, two flour mills in Kilmainham, known as the Hibernian Mills, were constructed and fully operational. The transition from ale to porter drastically increased his brewery's output as well: In 1796, the St. James's Gate brewery was producing 198,000 pints per month. By the time of his death, this number had reached 724,000 monthly pints.

Guinness died on 23 January 1803 at the family estate of Beaumont of unknown causes. Upon his death, his funeral bier, which was adorned with the family crest of the Magennises, carried his remains from the house to the parish church of Oughter Ard in County Kildare, and he was buried beside his mother. The funeral was presided over by his son Hosea. The inscription on his gravestone reads, "In the adjoining Vault are deposited the mortal remains of Arthur Guinness late of James's Gate in the city and of Beaumont in the County of Dublin Esquire who departed his life on the 23rd of January 1803 aged 78 years". His obituary in the Dublin Evening Post read, "The worthy and the good will regret him because his life has been useful and benevolent and virtuous."

Upon his death, Guinness's estate was valued at £23,000. In his will, Guinness left Beaumont and his investment properties to Hosea, while the younger Arthur had already inherited his brewery. Benjamin and William were given £1,500 apiece, while Elizabeth received £1,000. As Guinness's other daughters were unmarried at the time of his death, they each received £2,000 to cover a dowry. Finally, his widow was afforded Guinness's Gardiner Street house, carriage, and a fixed income of £200 annually.

== Legacy ==
Guinness beer remains popular worldwide, having generated £12.2 billion in net sales for the 2018 fiscal year. In 1997, Guinness PLC merged with Grand Metropolitan to form the beverage conglomerate Diageo. In addition to producing beer, part of the St. James's Gate brewery has been renovated into the Guinness Storehouse, a heritage centre and tourist attraction which opened in 2000. In May 2008, Diageo announced that it would close the Guinness breweries in Kilkenny and Dundalk, as well as half of the St. James's Gate brewery, but that it would retain the Storehouse and would renovate the remainder of the Dublin brewery. In 2009, for the 250th anniversary of Guinness beer, the company established the Arthur Guinness Fund, which awards funds and mentoring to businesses invested in social reform.

Diageo declared 24 September 2009 "Arthur's Day", meant to be a worldwide celebration of Guinness's life and legacy. As part of the celebrations, An Post released a commemorative postage stamp for the brewer, as they had also done in 1959 for the brewery's 200th anniversary. Diageo promoted annual Arthur's Days for five years before cancelling the celebrations in 2014. Shortly after the festival was cancelled, the Kildare tourism department announced "Arthur's Way", a heritage trail connecting several locations in Dublin that were important to Guinness, including Celbridge, Leixlip, and Oughter Ard. The year prior, tangentially to Arthur's Day, a statue of Guinness was erected in Celbridge.

== See also ==
- Arthur's Day – Annual music events
- Guinness family
- House of Guinness, 8-part series on Netflix
- List of people on the postage stamps of Ireland
- Richard Hennessy – Irish Jacobite merchant

== Bibliography ==
- Corcoran, Tony (2005). The Goodness of Guinness: The Brewery, Its People and the City of Dublin. Dublin, IE: Liberties Press. ISBN 0-9545335-7-7.
- Guinness, Michele (1999). The Guinness Spirit: Brewers and Bankers, Ministers and Missionaries. London, UK: Hodder & Stoughton. ISBN 0-340-72165-0.
- Guinness, Patrick (2008). Arthur's Round: The Life and Times of Brewing Legend Arthur Guinness. London, UK: Peter Owen. ISBN 978-0-7206-1296-7.
- Mansfield, Stephen (2009). The Search for God and Guinness: A Biography of the Beer That Changed the World. Nashville, TN: Nelson Books. ISBN 978-0-7180-1133-8.
- Yenne, Bill (2007). Guinness: The 250-Year Quest for the Perfect Pint. Hoboken, NJ: John Wiley & Sons, Inc. ISBN 978-0-470-12052-1.
