= Francis Pratt Winter =

Sir Francis Pratt Winter, CMG (23 February 1848 – 29 March 1919) was chief judicial officer of British New Guinea. He was knighted by letters patent in 1900.
