= James Cornelius O'Dowd =

Sir James Cornelius O'Dowd CB DL (1829 – 15 December 1903) was deputy Judge Advocate General (1869-1899). He was knighted at Windsor Castle in 1900.

O'Dowd was the son of James Klyne O'Dowd, a barrister of Castlebar, Mayo. He was a student of the Middle Temple from 15 November 1853, aged 24 years, and he was called to the bar 26 January 1859. Amongst other works he published a treatise on Court Martial in the British Army [cited here] He was never married and died on 15 December 1903.
