= Denis O'Brien (police officer) =

Irish member of the Garda Síochána

- Born: 17 June 1899; Dublin, Ireland
- Died: 9 September 1942 (aged 43); Ballyboden, Rathfarnham, County Dublin, Ireland
- Other name: Dinny
- Spouse: Anne Cooney
- Police career
- Department: Garda Síochána Special Branch Division
- Service years: 1933–1942
- Rank: Detective Sergeant
- Badge no.: 8288

Detective Sergeant Denis O'Brien (17 June 1899 – 9 September 1942), sometimes called "Dinny O'Brien", was a veteran of the Irish War of Independence and the Irish Civil War. He joined the Garda Síochána in 1933 and was killed by the Anti-Treaty IRA in 1942.

== Early life ==
Denis O'Brien was born at 3 Boatman's Lane, (Note: Spelled as Bowmans Lane in his birth record.) near Cork Street, Dublin, the son of Patrick O'Brien, a labourer, and Mary Anne O'Brien, née Kane. The O'Brien family were still living at Boatman's Lane at the time of the 1901 census, but by the 1911 census they had moved to Pim Street, near Usher's Quay, Dublin. He was educated at James's Street school by the Congregation of Christian Brothers. As a 17-year-old, he fought in the 1916 Easter Rising with the Marrowbone Lane Garrison of the Irish Volunteers. Briefly imprisoned by the British Army at Richmond Barracks, O'Brien was released on account of his age. He joined the Irish Republican Army in 1917, eventually succeeding his brother Patrick as O.C. ("officer commanding") 'C' Company, 4th Battalion, Dublin Brigade. He commanded his company through the whole period up until the Anglo-Irish Treaty. During the Irish Civil War, Denis and his brothers joined the Anti-Treaty IRA and fought in the Four Courts. After his capture during the Battle of Dublin, Denis was interned at the Curragh Camp until 1924. He later served as an accountancy clerk with the Electricity Supply Board. He married Annie Cooney at St James' Catholic Church, Dublin on 12 April 1926.

== Police career ==
In 1933, Éamon de Valera, the new President of the Executive Council of the Irish Free State, issued a call for IRA veterans to join the Gardaí. O'Brien joined the Garda Síochána on 9 August 1933 (with registration number 8288), and subsequently entered the Detective Branch section (now known as the Special Detective Unit) headed by Eamon Broy. Broy, a former Detective Sergeant in the G Division of the Dublin Metropolitan Police, had spied for Michael Collins during the Irish War of Independence. Among Irish republican legitimists, however, O'Brien and his colleagues were referred to as "The Broy Harriers".

O'Brien was promoted to Detective Sergeant on 15 October 1937 and remained in the Gardaí when de Valera introduced a more Republican constitution in 1937 and abolished the Oath of Allegiance to the British Monarchy.

=== World War II ===
During the Second World War O'Brien was a Detective Sergeant in the Special Branch Division, which had its headquarters at Dublin Castle. The Special Branch Division was then largely tasked with hunting down foreign spies, shot down Allied and Axis airmen, and members of the IRA, who were interned and held for the duration of hostilities in the Curragh Camp, County Kildare. De Valera's government regarded the collaboration of the IRA with the intelligence services of Nazi Germany as a serious threat to Irish neutrality and, especially considering Winston Churchill's recent decision to order the invasions of several other neutral nations, Ireland's national security.

According to historian Tim Pat Coogan, "An iron-gloved approach to the IRA was the order of the day with vigorous raids and interrogations. As a result, relations between individual IRA men and the Special Branch became understandably strained, and the IRA, in its shattered and disorganised condition, came to regard the Special Branch as a greater enemy than the British Crown."

Detective Sergeant O'Brien was involved in investigating the murders of two colleagues during a Garda raid on an IRA training centre at 98A Rathgar Road, Dublin on 16 August 1940, just two years before his own ambush and murder. Violent resistance to the Special Branch raiding party resulted in the murders of Detective Sergeant Patrick McKeown and Detective Garda Richard Hyland. Contrary to militant republican lore, Denis O'Brien was not part of the Garda raiding party at Rathgar Road. His role in the investigation, however, did result in the arrest, trial, and executions of IRA members Patrick McGrath, Thomas Harte, and Tom Hunt. Although Hunt also faced execution, his sentence was commuted on the day of his execution and he was imprisoned in the Curragh.

== Assassination ==
At 9:45 am on 9 September 1942 at Ballyboden, Rathfarnham, County Dublin, O'Brien left his house and began getting into his car. Three IRA men, wearing trenchcoats and armed with Thompson submachine guns, lay in wait for him as he drove out his drive and opened fire. The shots from the Thompson smashed the windows of his car but he was uninjured and he alighted and ran for cover to the gate but upon reaching it, he was shot by a single round to the head. The fatal shot was from a volley from a second Thompson gun fired by another IRA man secreted across the Ballyboden Road adjacent to Kerr's Sawmill. Detective Sergeant O'Brien was shot in the back of the head as he returned fire on the IRA men on his property. He was posthumously awarded a gold Scott Medal for bravery in 2024.

Two of the assassins wrapped the Thompsons in their trenchcoats, mounted their bicycles, and rode towards Dublin. Future IRA Chief of Staff Charlie Kerins left on foot, leaving his bicycle behind.

According to author Tim Pat Coogan, "The shooting greatly increased public feeling against the IRA, particularly as the murder was carried out almost in full view of his wife. As she held her dying husband, she watched his assailants cycling past."

== Aftermath ==
Two years later, Kerins was arrested in a pre-dawn raid and tried by court-martial for the murder of Detective Sergeant O'Brien. At a special military tribunal in Collins Barracks, Dublin, Kerins was formally charged on 2 October 1944 for the "shooting at Rathfarnham of Detective Dinny O'Brien". According to Coogan,

"At the end of his trial, the president of the Military Court delayed sentence until later in the day to allow Kerins, if he wished, to make an application whereby he might have avoided the capital sentence. When the court resumed, Kerins said: "You could have adjourned it for six years as far as I am concerned, as my attitude towards this Court will always be the same." He thus deprived himself of the right to give evidence, to face cross examination, or to call witnesses.

After Kerins' fingerprints were identified on the bicycle which was left at the crime scene, he was found guilty, and sentenced to death by hanging. Col. James V. Joyce who presided on the Special Military Court noted that on sentencing Kerins, he appeared for the first time to be 'shook'. The sentence was carried out by British chief executioner Albert Pierrepoint, who was regularly employed for such occasions by the Irish State, at Mountjoy Prison on 1 December 1944, in spite of numerous calls for clemency.

Archie Doyle, who is also alleged to have been in command of the IRA hit squad during the killing of O'Brien, died in 1980.

== See also ==
- List of Irish police officers killed in the line of duty
