= Variety Jones (restaurant) =

Restaurant in Kinsale, Ireland

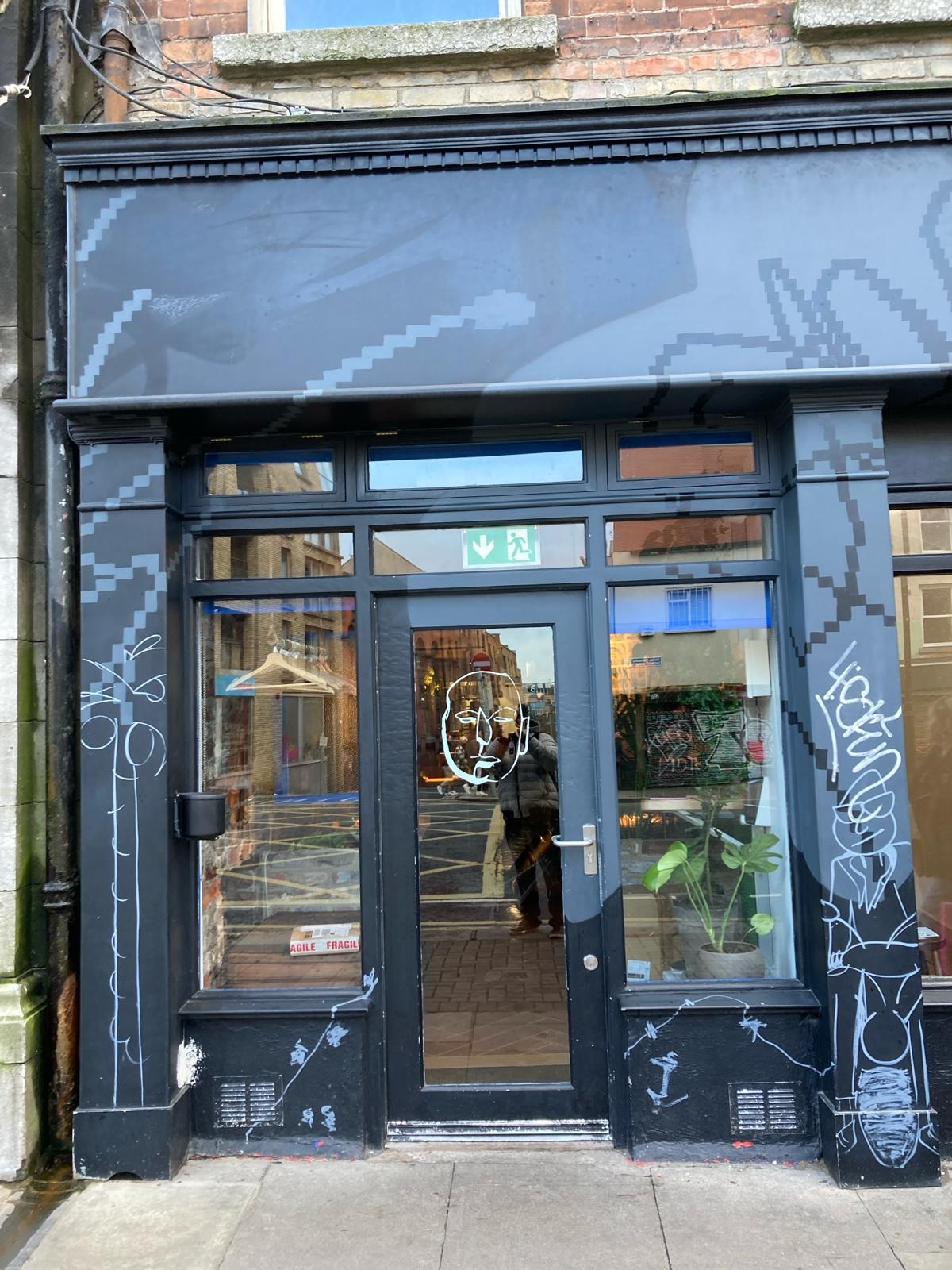

- Location within Central Dublin

Restaurant information
- Established: 20 December 2018
- Owners: Keelan Higgs, Aaron Higgs
- Head chef: Keelan Higgs
- Food type: Irish
- Rating: Michelin Guide
- Location: 78 Thomas Street, Dublin, D08 F2RN, Ireland
- Coordinates: 53.342950°N 6.276249°W
- Seating capacity: 30
- Reservations: https://www.varietyjones.ie/bookings
- Website: varietyjones.ie

Variety Jones is a restaurant in Dublin, Ireland.

== History ==
Opened in December 2018 by head chef Keelan Higgs and his brother Aaron, the restaurant takes its name from Variety Jones (Roger Thomas Clark), one of the founders of the online market Silk Road; Higgs' brother Aaron once worked in a Thailand bar that belonged to Clark. It is located in The Liberties, across from John's Lane Church. Variety Jones received a Michelin star in the 2020 Michelin Guide Great Britain & Ireland.

== Awards ==
- Michelin star: since 2019

== See also ==
- List of Michelin starred restaurants in Ireland
