= Cooney sisters =

Three Irish sisters involved in the War of Independence and the Easter Rising

Cooney Sisters
- Anne Cooney in her Cumann na mBan uniform 1916
- Origin: Dublin, Ireland
- Members: Anne, Lily, Eileen
- Connected members: Thomas, Michael

The Cooney sisters were three Irish sisters, notable for their involvement in Irish Nationalism and Cumann na mBan.

== Biographies ==
Anne, Lily and Eileen were born in Dublin to Michael Cooney and Mary Higgs who lived in Usher's Quay, Dublin. Their father was an engine driver.

The three sisters were involved with the nationalist movement in Ireland. This involvement was through the people who lived in and visited their house on a regular basis on the years leading up to the 1916 Easter Rising, like Christopher Byrne and Con Colbert. They joined Cumann na mBan in 1915 and were trained as usual in all the first aid and military training which took place on Harcourt and Camden streets. Along with Byrne and Colbert, Joe McGrath and Phil Cosgrave frequently visited the house and were senior officers in their branches of the Volunteers. The house was used to store ammunition in preparation for the Rising and used as a distribution centre in the days leading up to it. A younger brother, Thomas, was used in the Rising as a runner.

Con Colbert was one of the leaders of the rebellion and was executed by the British for his involvement. He set out for the events of the Easter Rising from the Cooney house in Usher's Quay.

All three women were members of the Inghinidhe branch of Cumann na mBan. The eldest girl involved was just 18 when they joined the Cumann. They all served in the Marrowbow Lane garrison during the Easter Rising with others like Marcella Cosgrave. Their father was arrested during the Rising when he tried to supply the garrison with food. He was kept in Kilmainham jail for the duration and for some time after the Rising. He was then sent to Wakefield in Britain before eventually being sent back to Dublin. All three sisters were arrested with the other women after the Rising and sent to Richmond Barracks initially and then on to Kilmainham jail. They were all released with the others on 8 May 1916.

After the Rising all three sisters were involved in the Irish National Aid Association and Volunteer Dependants' Fund, their own family being one of the dependants as a result of their father's arrest. They appear in the photo taken in the garden over the summer. They continued their involvement through the Irish War of Independence and into the Irish Civil War where they were Anti-Treaty. All three sisters recalled carrying weapons (concealed in their clothing) from the scene of an ambush in the Harcourt Street area of Dublin.

A quilt was created to remember the 77 women of Richmond Barracks and the three Cooney sisters are part of that memory, stitched with a green shamrock on their squares.

=== Anne ===
Anne was born 24 January 1896 at 58 Kennedy Villas, Dublin. She was an adjutant in Cumann na mBan. She was a seamstress and fashioned her military uniform from one that Colbert gave her. She later married Denis O'Brien at St James' Catholic Church, Dublin on 12 April 1926, who had been one of the volunteers in the Marrowbow Lane garrison with his two brothers.

=== Lily ===
Elizabeth "Lily" Cooney was born 16 January 1898 at 58 Kennedy Villas, Dublin. She was one of the sisters sent by bicycle to mobilise the Chapelizod section of F. Company, the main company that the sisters worked with during the lead up to the Rising. She served with her sisters in the Marrowbow Lane garrison and continued to serve through the War of Independence. She collected funds for prisoners and arms as well as transporting both arms and information around the country. She was instrumental in identifying an agent of Crown forces. She later married Michael Francis Curran at St James' Catholic Church, Dublin on 6 September 1937.

=== Eileen ===
Eileen was born on 26 December 1899. She is listed as Alice on the 1901 census. After the Rising she was involved in the First World War anti-conscription activities. As part of the Cumann she collected money for weapons and was involved in propaganda work. Her area during the War of Independence was to ensure the welfare of the interned Irish. She also worked on First aid stations and acted as a courier. She held the rank of Section Commander from November 1920. She later married John (Sean) Harbourne at St James' Catholic Church, Dublin on 11 February 1929. She died on 22 April 1982.
