= St Catherine's Church, Dublin (Church of Ireland) =

Protestant church in Dublin, Ireland

St. Catherine's Church, Dublin
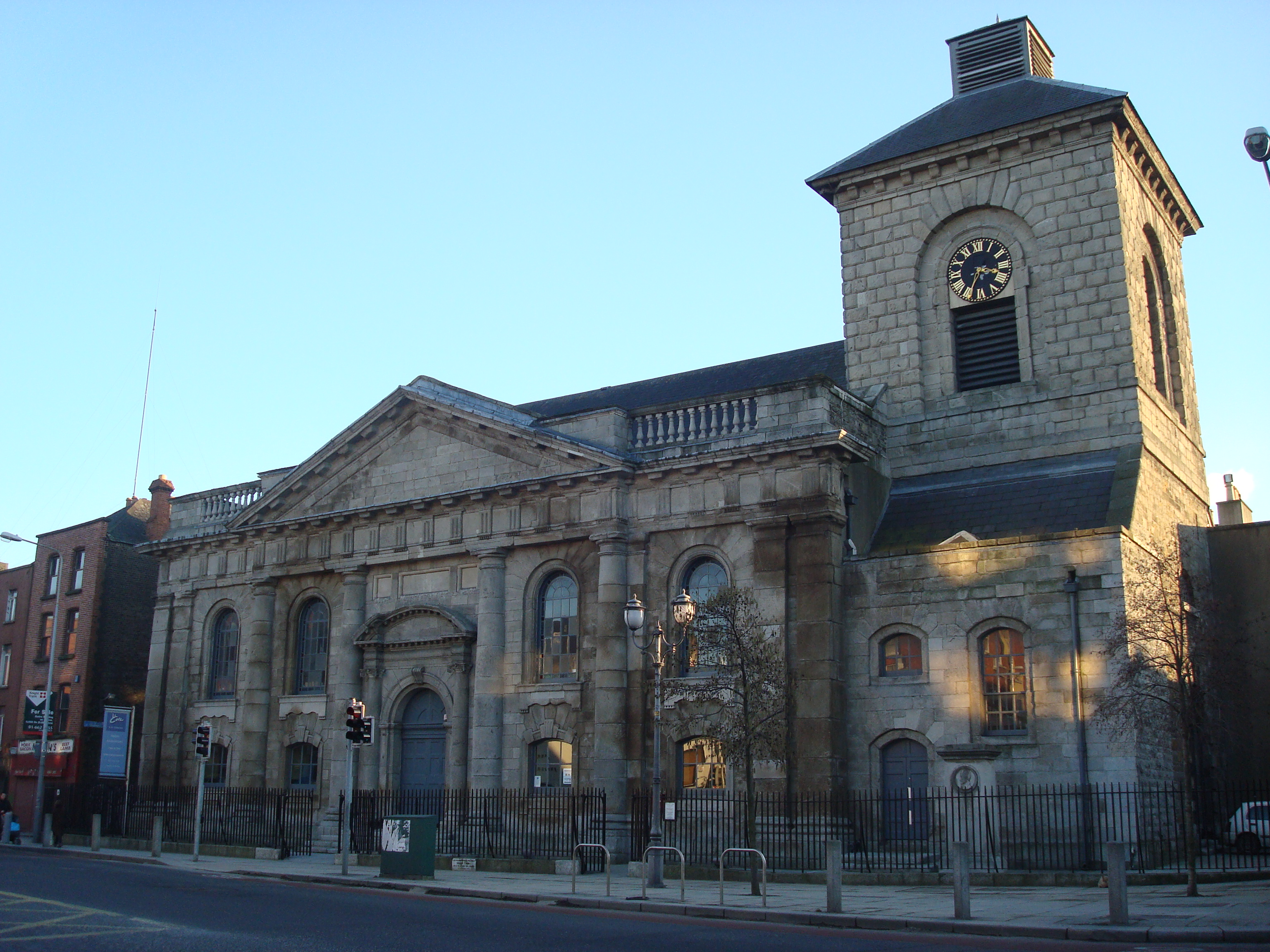
- Thomas Street façade
- St. Catherine's Church, Dublin
- 53.3430°N 6.2812°W
- Location: Dublin
- Country: Ireland
- Denomination: Church of Ireland
- Churchmanship: Low Church
- Website: saintcatherines.ie

History
- Dedication: St. Catherine

Administration
- Province: Province of Dublin
- Diocese: Diocese of Dublin and Glendalough

St. Catherine's Church, on Thomas Street, in Dublin, Ireland, was originally built in 1185. It is located on what was once termed the "Slí Mhór" (Irish: Great Way), a key route that ran westwards across Ireland from Dublin. The church was rebuilt in its present form in the 18th century by John Smyth (or Smith).

The church closed in 1966 due to a decrease in the size of the local congregation. The church was de-consecrated the following year, and for a period was used by Dublin Corporation for exhibitions and concerts. After a period of decline, and later of refurbishment, St. Catherine's was re-consecrated and has been the place of worship for the Anglican "CORE" church (City Outreach for Renewal and Evangelism) since then.

== History ==
=== Parish history ===
In 1177, the parish of St. James is mentioned as part of the Augustinian abbey of St. Thomas (from which Thomas Street got its name), and the church of St. Catherine was a chapel-of-ease to the abbey. By the end of the 13th century, the western suburbs had so increased in population that a separate parish was deemed necessary. This was provided for by splitting the parish of St. James and setting up an independent parish for St. Catherine's.

Both parishes were still subservient to the Abbey of St. Thomas, but in 1539 the abbey was dissolved with all the monasteries by Henry VIII. In the surrender made by Henry Duffe, the last Abbot, "the Churches of St. Catherine and St. James near Dublin" were included. Both churches, now independent, had new curates appointed by the crown: Sir John Brace to St. Catherine's (which was shortly taken over by Peter Ledwich (or Ledwidge)) and Sir John Butler to St. James. Over the following hundred years, both churches passed over to the reformed church, while Roman Catholic priests led a precarious existence tending to the larger part of the population, which remained faithful to the old religion.

The parish of St. Catherine appears to have been the only viable one in the area at that time, Roman Catholics eventually got the use of a chapel in Dirty Lane (now Bridgefoot Street) towards the end of the 17th century. Later, another St. Catherine's was founded in Meath Street to cater for the Catholic population.

A new organ, which was designed and made by Renatus Harris, was installed in 1697.

The two Church of Ireland parishes were separated in 1710.

=== Building history ===
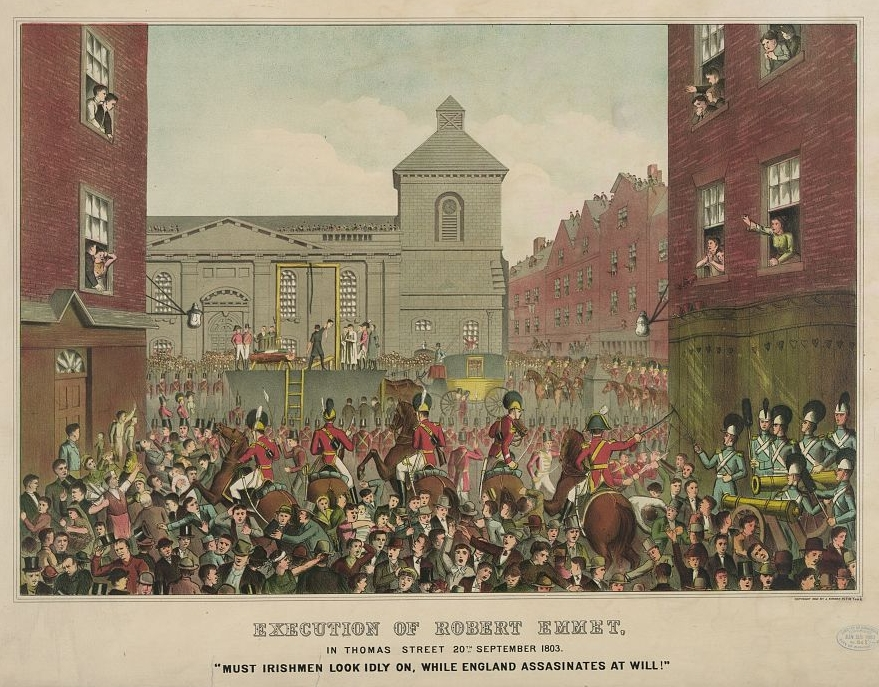
A print illustrating the execution of Robert Emmet outside St. Catherine's, which can be seen in the background

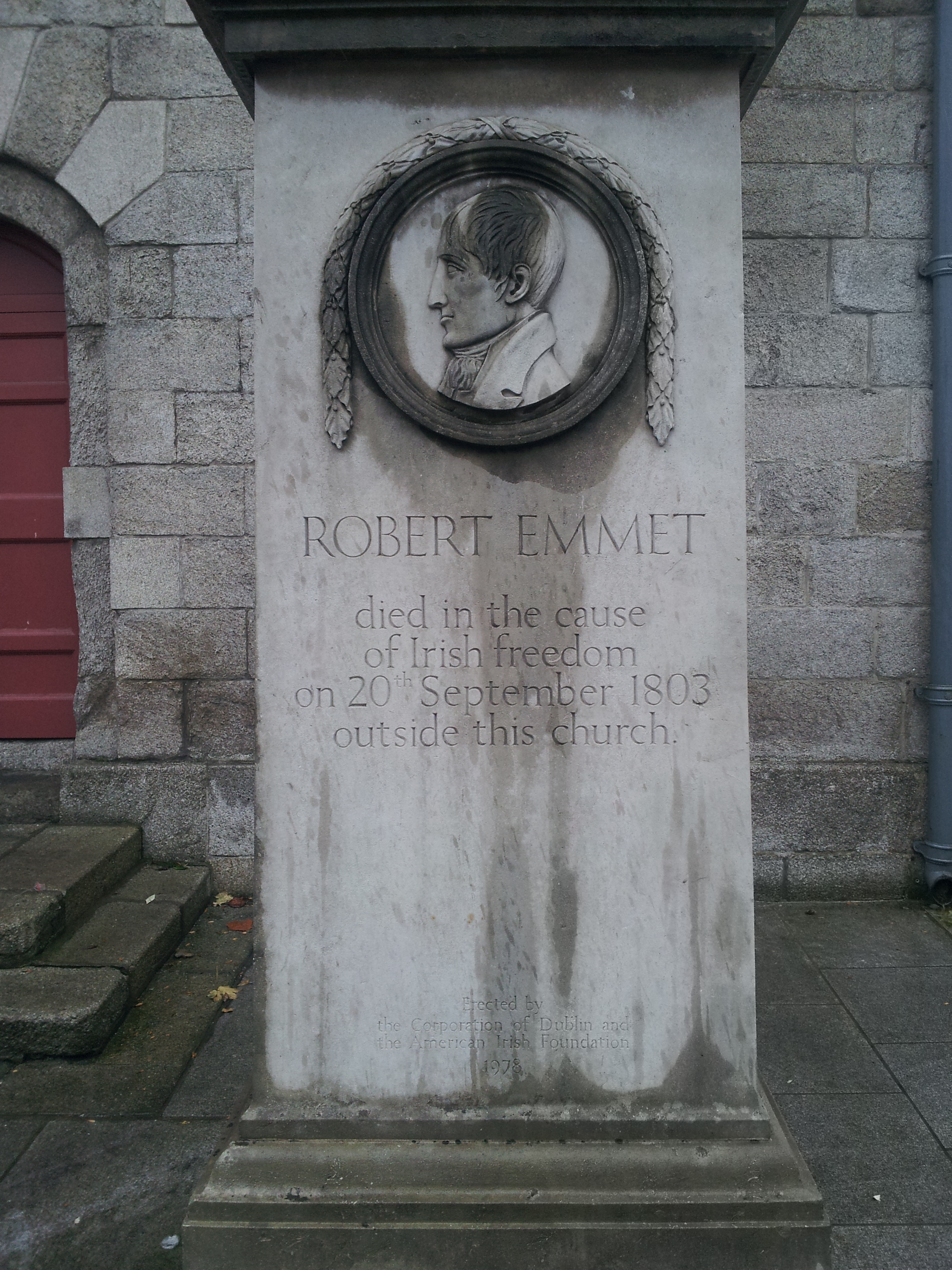
Robert Emmet's marker in front of the church

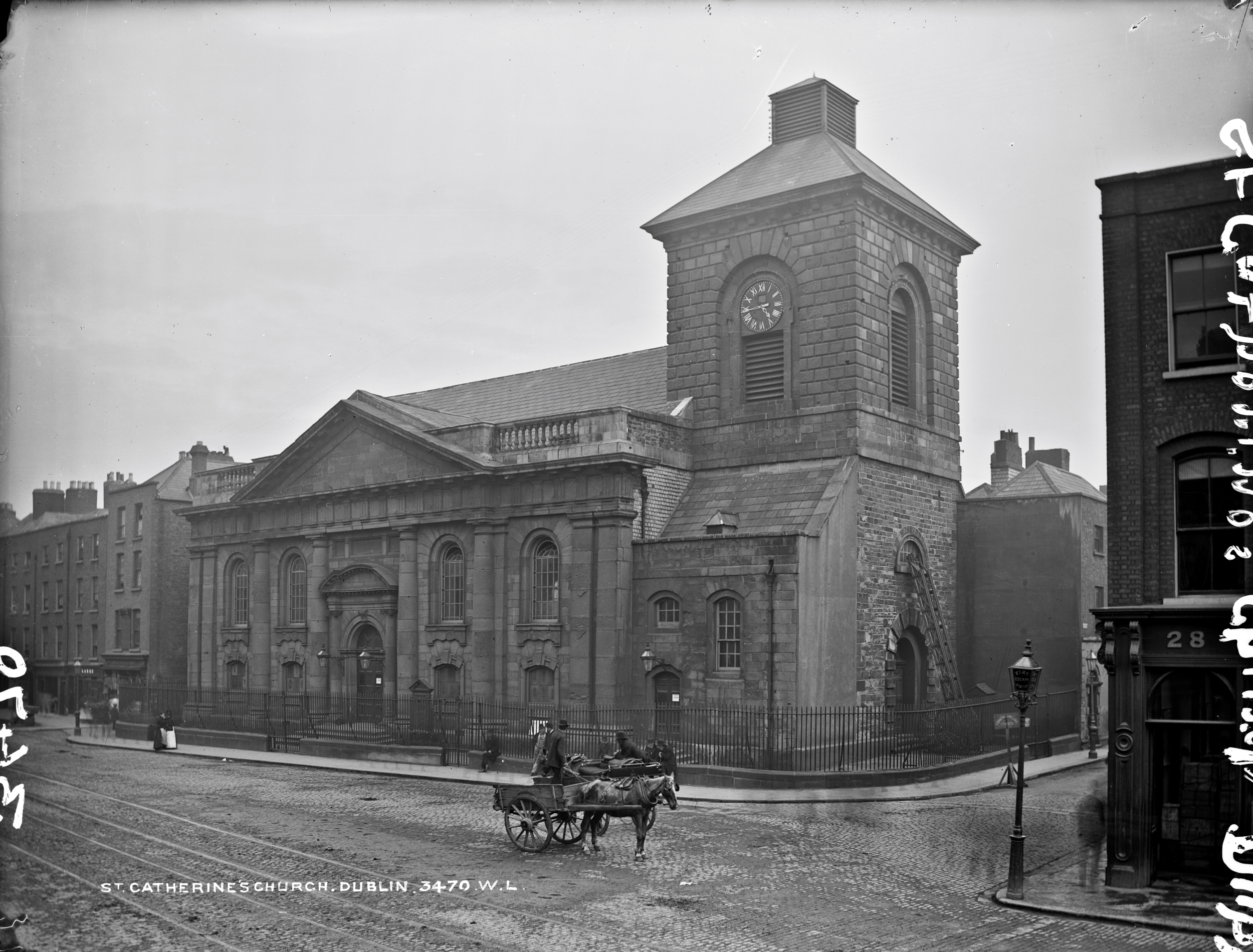
A photo of the church circa 1890.

The building that stands now was originally built between 1760 and 1769 to the designs of the architect John Smyth who was also responsible for the interior of nearby St Werburgh's Church, among other works in Dublin at the time.

The new church cost £7,000 with the foundation stone laid in 1760 and the church opening for worship in 1769. Joseph Jarratt was also paid for some works at the church

In 1803 the church was the site of Robert Emmet's execution - and a plaque commemorating this remains today.

Into the 20th century, the Protestant population of the Liberties area of the city declined, and the church closed in September 1966. It was de-consecrated the following year. Worship was transferred to its former chapel of ease the Church of St. Victor, which was renamed St. Catherine and James Church, Donore Ave.

St. Catherine's was transferred for a number of years to Dublin Corporation, and was used for exhibitions and concerts - hosting artists such as Christy Moore and The Chieftains. In the mid-1960s, the building was due to be demolished as part of Dublin Corporation's 'Inner Tangent Road' proposal, which was eventually dropped. It fell disused in the 1980s, and the interior was vandalised.

In 1990, Dublin Corporation offered the church for sale as part of an inner city development plan. An Anglican group (City Outreach for Renewal and Evangelism - CORE) took on the refurbishment of the church in 1993, and the interior was largely restored by the end of 1998. In early November 1998 St. Catherine's was reconsecrated and has been an active place of worship since then.

== Church architecture ==
Historian Maurice Craig wrote that St. Catherine's has "the finest façade of any church in Dublin". Its façade is built of mountain granite and has in the centre four Doric semi-columns supporting a pediment, and at the extremities coupled pilasters. Originally a spire was intended, but this was not completed due to lack of funds. It is in the Palladian style similar to St Thomas's Church on Marlborough Street.

Internally, St. Catherine's is a galleried church (a type common in Dublin from the late 17th century) Architects Curdy and Mitchell restored the church in 1877 and during the following decade an interior reordering was undertaken by architect James Franklin Fuller, during which the old box pews were replaced with open ones.

The crypt contains the remains of several Earls of Meath. Christopher Plunkett, 2nd Earl of Fingall, fatally wounded at the Battle of Rathmines, was buried in St Catherine's in August 1649.

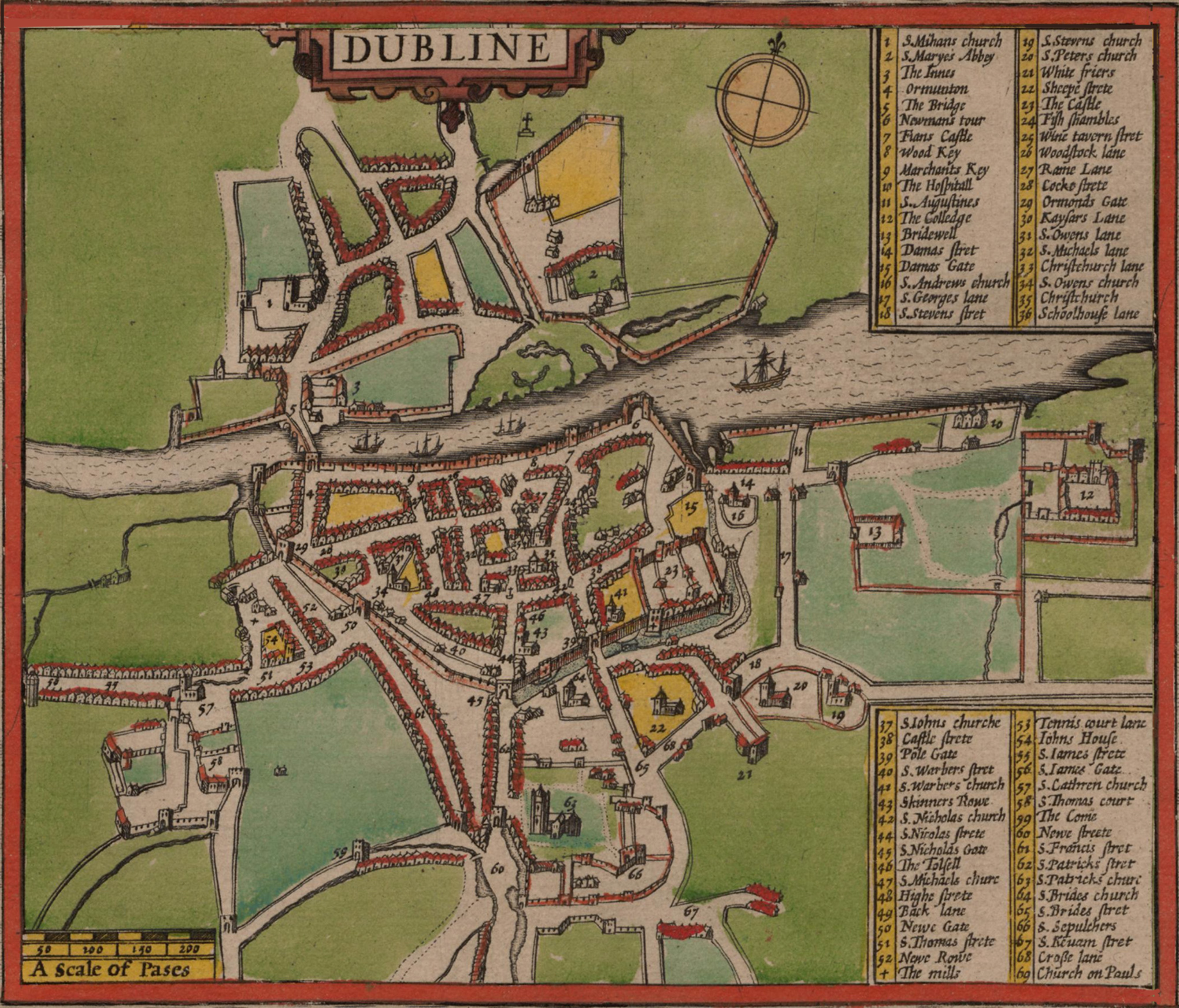
Map (reprinted 1896) showing the layout of Dublin in 1610. St. Catherine's is marked as location number 57 on "S. Thomas Strete" (sic)

== Cemetery ==
The churchyard and cemetery lie to the rear of St. Catherine's. Originally dating to 1552, burials ceased in 1894. The cemetery is now a small public park. There is a plot which was provided by the Protestant Orphan Society for the burial of orphans, in the churchyard. There is a memorial to those who took part in the 1803 Rising, and were hanged, some were hanged on Thomas Street.

== Clergy ==
According to early records the vicar of St. Catherine's, in 1551, was Rev. Peter Lodowicke (Ledwich) and his successor was Rev. John Hande.

Notable clergy to have served in St. Catherines include the rectors Rev. James Whitelaw (1749–1813), and Rev. John Percy Phair (1876–1967; later Bishop of Ossory).

Rev. Eoghan Heaslip was appointed minister in 2017.

== Notable parishioners ==
- James Whitelaw (1749–1813), historian and statistician, was clergyman in this parish when he died of a fever contracted while visiting afflicted parishioners.
- William Mylne (1734–1790), architect and engineer, who was responsible for the waterworks of Dublin, commemorated by a plaque in the church.

== See also ==
- St James' Church, Dublin (Church of Ireland)
- St. Catherine and James Church, originally a chapel of ease for St. Catherines, called St. Victors, following de-consecration of St. Catheines and St. James' it was re-dedicated, and replaced the two churches
