= James "Lugs" Branigan =

Irish police officer (1910–1986)

Detective Sergeant James Branigan
- Born: James Christopher Branigan; 6 January 1910; James's Street, Dublin, Ireland
- Died: 22 May 1986 (aged 76); Summerhill, County Meath, Ireland
- Resting place: Deans Grange Cemetery
- Other name: Lugs
- Education: Training at Phoenix Park Garda Training Depot
- Spouse: Elizabeth "Elsie" Armstrong
- Police career
- Country: Garda Síochána
- Service years: 1931–1973
- Rank: Sergeant
- Memorials: Plaque in Whitefriar Street Carmelite Church
- Other work: Amateur boxer and boxing administrator

James Christopher "Lugs" Branigan (6 January 1910 – 22 May 1986) was a well-known member of the Garda Síochána in the 1950s and 1960s, as well as an Irish boxer and boxing referee. He has been described as a "legend and part of Dublin mythology," but has also been criticised for alleged police brutality.

The nickname 'Lugs' refers to his prominent ears. A keen boxer, he achieved his nickname 'Lugs' early in life due to his cauliflower ears, a condition most common among amateur wrestlers, rugby players, mixed martial artists and grapplers, it is said he got the name because of his ears by a Dublin criminal in the 1940s – a nickname he disliked. According to Neary (1985), he was known as Jim, "Branno" and "The Bran" to his Garda colleagues, and "Bat", from battler which he was known as from his boxing days.

== Early life ==
Branigan was born on No. 1 James's Street, Dublin, which was part of Saint Kevin's Hospital (South Dublin union) in 1910. He was the son of John Alick Branigan, an official of South Dublin Union, and Ellen Branigan (née Kavanagh). James witnessed the shooting of a British soldier during the 1916 Rising – the area they lived in saw heavy fighting. It is now part of Ushers Quay. He was educated at Basin Lane Convent and James' Street Christian Brothers School.

== Career ==
=== Railway apprenticeship ===
Branigan left school at 14 to become an apprentice fitter on Great Southern Railways, where he was bullied. On completing his apprenticeship, he left.

=== Gardaí ===
Branigan joined the Gardaí on June 18, 1931 and took up physical exercise after barely passing physical requirements. He was stationed in Kevin Street in 1936 and was known for using physical force against petty criminals, which he admitted to doing to avoid excessive paperwork. Upon joining the police force, Garda Branigan distinguished himself during violent disturbances during the 'wild' forties in Dublin and became well known after a violent riot which subsequently became known as the 'Battle of Baldoyle' where one person died. Branigan sometimes acted as an unofficial social worker, as he was close to people on his beat.

He was promoted to detective Garda in July 1958 and Garda sergeant in December 1963 and put in charge of a mobile riot squad unit, which he remained active with until his retirement. He became well known after he took charge of this unit, the so-called Prevention and Detection of Street Nuisances Unit, also known as 'Brano Five Team', who were called out to any trouble spots in Dublin. This unit became well known around the night spots of Dublin, such as dance halls and cinemas, where "tough justice" (a beating rather than an arrest) was meted out to any transgressors.

Branigan, who headed up the unit until its disbandment in 1973, had the respect of both the community and judiciary, the now Sergeant Branigan becoming a well-known figure in Dublin during the 1960s. Stories of mistreatment, rough or tough justice surrounded Garda Branigan and his squad, the sight of his Bedford CT van, was feared on Dublin's late-night streets. His individual heavy-handedness, strength and fearlessness drew much attention to Sergeant Branigan, his personal notoriety growing over the years. There are also allegations that some young men were beaten up in Garda cars, cells and alleys for little or no reason. He had particularly targeted Teddy Boys and allegedly saw the film, Rock Around the Clock over sixty times because of riots at the screenings.

He believed his outspoken personality had been held against him by senior Gardaí, preventing his further promotion. An oft-repeated story has Detective Branigan giving culprits either the choice of a 'box to the face' or a day in court. Commenting in court after one notorious incident when a criminal bit him on the bottom during an arrest, he referred to the then-current allegations of cannibalism by the Baluba people during the Niemba Ambush in Congo, saying "He was worse than the Balubas. At least they cook you first." He was reprimanded by the Gardaí for the remark.

Later in his career, he acted as a minder for numerous celebrities, including Cliff Richard, Elizabeth Taylor, Richard Burton, and George Best.

== Reputation ==
Detective Branigan in his day enjoyed the respect of the community, the bench and those he prosecuted and sometimes he was appointed as a bodyguard to visiting celebrities. Since his death, there has been an increased interest and nostalgia about the activities of his squad, with a senior High Court Judge, Mr Justice Paul Carney, claiming in 2009 that the heavy-handed detectives like Garda Branigan were required in today's Dublin to deter crime. Carney said of Detective Branigan:

Nowadays, in more politically correct times, he would probably be abolished by the Garda Ombudsman Commission, and possibly also prosecuted...Had his unit, known as Prevention and Detection of Street Nuisances, been continued rather than disbanded on his retirement, I suspect that the streets of Dublin would be considerably safer than they are now....I am dealing primarily with my experiences in trials on indictment, which evolved from a situation in my early days where there was an attack on Garda behaviour in virtually every case, to a situation in which there is now virtually no criticism of garda conduct in my court.

In what I might describe as the bad old days, there were frequent allegations of verbals being floated in the police car on the way to the station or on the stairs leading from the cells to the dock...I never hear such allegations now.

Senator David Norris, a civil rights campaigner and longtime member of Seanad Éireann (the Irish Senate), said in the senate chamber in 1993 that:

There is an onus on us to ensure that the guardians of law and order are protected. We have reached the point where the balance of advantage has been taken from the gardaí and given to the criminals. As a university student I recall seeing Garda "Lugs" Branigan in the Olympic Ballroom. He parted the hordes like the Dead Sea to take three people who were in front of the band stand into the back alley and rendered his own justice. Nobody protested. I am not suggesting that we return to those days but I believe that the balance has gone too far in the other direction.

On 28 January 2009, RTÉ Radio 1's Liveline, a popular talk programme, featured callers reminiscing about Detective Branigan and his activities as a Garda in Dublin.

In November 2015 he was the subject of a documentary on TG4, in which he was both praised for his work and criticised for excessive violence.

=== Boxing ===
During the 1930s, Branigan was involved with the Garda Boxing Club, fighting at cruiser-weight, light-heavyweight and heavyweight and eventually winning the Leinster heavyweight title. He originally started boxing because he was, by his own admission, a "skinny kid" and actively worked to build himself up. He started daily morning running, followed by evenings in the gym. He also joined the Neptune Rowing Team to build his strength. In 1938, he fought for the Ireland international boxing team in Germany. He retired from boxing in 1939, though he became a referee. He sparred with younger boxers and weight-trained well into his sixties.He lived on Drimnagh Road, just off the Crumlin Road in Dublin, and was treasurer of the County Dublin Board of the Irish Amateur Boxing Association (IABA) and acted as a boxing referee into his late seventies.

== Retirement and death ==
Branigan retired on 6 January 1973. He received many tributes, but was particularly touched by a canteen of cutlery and Waterford glass set from some Dublin prostitutes, who regarded him as a father figure. He had requested to stay on in the Gardaí for two years, but the request was denied.

He, with his wife, Elizabeth, spent most of his retirement in Summerhill, County Meath, breeding budgerigars and growing crops. In 1981, a variety of dahlia was named after him, having been registered by his son, Alick, with the Royal Horticultural Society.

He died in the Adelaide Hospital on 22 May 1986. His funeral at Mount Argus church was attended by members of the Garda Síochána and former Irish boxing champions and under a Garda escort, his body was brought to Summerhill where he was buried.
