= List of tunnels in Ireland =

Most of Ireland's tunnels date from the 19th century in the building of the railways, typically excavated through rock by blasting and then hand excavation.

The more modern tunnels include the longer road tunnels and utility tunnels, constructed from approximately 1940 to date, using a variety of tunnelling methods.

Historically, a number of country estates had tunnels, both to provide privacy (and means of escape) and to keep the views from the house clear of servants and labourers. Stone and brick built sewers are often mistaken for "tunnels", in particular in central Dublin.

There are a number of pseudo tunnels. For example, at Dunkettle in Cork, to construct the interchange at the north end of the Jack Lynch Tunnel, a section of railway approximately 100 m long was covered so that the N25 (now part of the M8) could cross the railway at a shallow angle - a "cover only" tunnel. Where the North Dublin Link Railway (Great Southern & Western Railway) passes under the Royal Canal and the Liffey Line (Midland and Great Western Railway), the railway is in essence in two cut-and-cover tunnels.

== Railway ==
=== Operational ===
- Bray Head Tunnel No. 1 (Connolly Station, Dublin to Rosslare Europort - 274 metres)
- Bray Head Tunnel No. 2 (Connolly Station, Dublin to Rosslare Europort - 131 metres)
- Bray Head Tunnel No. 3 (Connolly Station, Dublin to Rosslare Europort - 192 metres)
- Bray Head Tunnel No. 4 (Connolly Station, Dublin to Rosslare Europort - 991 metres)
- Castlerock (Coleraine to Derry - 610 metres)
- Cork (Heuston Station, Dublin to Cork Kent Station - 1239 metres)
- Cross Gunns (Liffey Junction to North Wall (MGWR) - 162 metres)
- Downhill (Coleraine to Derry - 275 metres)
- Enniscorthy (Connolly Station, Dublin to Rosslare Europort - 370 metres)
- Ferrycarrig (Connolly Station, Dublin to Rosslare Europort - 271 metres)
- Killurin (Connolly Station, Dublin to Rosslare Europort - 82 metres)
- Lisburn Road, Belfast (Belfast Central Junction to Belfast Central - 98 metres)
- Phoenix Park (Islandbridge Junction to Glasnevin Junction - 692 metres)
- Rathdrum No. 1 (Connolly Station, Dublin to Rosslare Europort - 174 metres)
- Rathdrum No. 2 (Connolly Station, Dublin to Rosslare Europort - 23 metres)
- Rathdrum No. 3 (Connolly Station, Dublin to Rosslare Europort - 46 metres)
- Snow Hill (Waterford to Rosslare Strand - 198 metres)
- Sorrento Tunnel, Dalkey (Connolly Station, Dublin to Rosslare Europort - 146 metres)
- Whitehead (Belfast Central to Larne Harbour - 145 metres(Down line only))

=== Proposed ===
- DART Underground, Dublin. Spencer Dock to Inchicore - dual bored tunnel.
- Metro North, Dublin. St. Stephen's Green to Ballymun dual bored and twin cut and cover tunnel.
- Metro North, Dublin. Dublin Airport - dual bored tunnel.
- Metro North, Dublin. Fosterstown Underpass - short twin cut and cover tunnel.
- Irish Sea Tunnel - hypothetical.

=== Closed ===
- Barnagh (Ballingrane Junction to Tralee - 91 metres)
- Brabazon Tunnel (Connolly Station, Dublin to Rosslare Europort - ?? metres, bypassed by Bray Head No. 1)
- Drung Hill No. 1 (Farranfore to Valentia Harbour - 110 metres)
- Drung Hill No. 2 (Farranfore to Valentia Harbour - 83 metres)
- Dungannon (Portadown to Dungannon - 744 metres)
- Durrow (Waterford to Dungarvan - 397 meters)
- Cork, Albert Quay. (Cork to Bandon -?? meters))Demolished. aka High street tunnel.
- Cork, Passage West Tunnel (Cork to Crosshaven - 520 metres)
- Corrib Tunnel, Aghoose - Glenagad Co. Mayo. Built for the housing of the offshore Corrib gas pipeline and associated services, backfilled upon completion, ran a locomotive on narrow gauge track, (4,900 meters)
- Gogginshill (Ballinhassig) (Cork to Bandon - 828 metres)
- James's Street, Dublin (Guinness internal railway)
- Kilpatrick (Innishannon) (Cork to Bandon - 122 meters)
- Lisummon (Newry to Armagh - 1,608 meters)
- Loughgilly (Newry to Armagh - 334 meters)
- Mount Elliot (Macmine Junction to New Ross - 684 metres)
- Newport No. 1 (Westport to Achill - 81 metres)
- Newport No. 2 (Westport to Achill - 122 metres)
- Prospect Hill, Galway (Galway to Clifden - 81 metres)
- Queen's Bridge (Belfast East Bridge Street Junction to Dufferin Dock Junction - 120metres)

=== Other ===
- Hodgson's Tunnel, Avoca, County Wicklow (Mineral tramway)
- Keady (Never used, built for Ulster & Connaught Light Railway)

== Road ==
Name	Location	Notes
Jack Lynch Tunnel	Cork	
Dublin Port Tunnel	Dublin	
Limerick Tunnel	Limerick (N18)	
Moll's Gap Tunnel	Kerry (N71)	
Turners Rock Tunnels	Cork - Kerry border (Glengarriff - Kenmare, N71)	Four tunnels (One main, two twin short tunnels and a short fourth tunnel)
Carrignamuck Tunnel	Cork - Kerry border (Bantry - Kilgarvan)	
Drummartin Tunnel	Eastern Bypass Dublin	Proposed
Blundell Aqueduct	Edenderry, Offaly	Carries L1001 'The tunnel road' under Grand Canal. Built as aqueduct, official signage warns it as tunnel.

== Canal ==
- Monaghan

== Drainage ==
Several large diameter drainage tunnels exist:

Dublin:

- Dún Laoghaire - Poolbeg
- Drimnagh - Poolbeg, along the Grand Canal
- Sutton - Poolbeg

Kilkenny:

- Kilkenny Main Drainage Tunnel

== Utilities ==
- Liffey Service Tunnel, Dublin
- Binnian Tunnel, Co. Down

== Other ==
- Ballymore Lower, Donegal (access tunnel to house) - On N56 near Dunfanaghy
- James's Street, Dublin (pedestrian tunnel connecting Guinness plant on either side of street)
- Lough Key Forest Park (tunnel previously part of landed estate)
- Esso N4 at Mullingar (Formerly Hamills), tunnel links two service stations either side of the dual carriageway, now closed due to lack of planning permission.
- Crumlin Road, Belfast (Victorian era foot tunnel between Crumlin Road Gaol & the Crumlin Road Courthouse, formerly used by prisoners and staff)
