= St. Catherine and James Church =

Coordinates: 53.3322°N 6.2836°W

St. Catherine and James Church, Donore Ave, Dublin (formerly called the Church of St. Victor). Is a Church of Ireland church built in 1896 originally as a chapel of ease for St. Catherines, in 1914 it was dedicated to St. Victor, following de-consecration and closure of St. Catherines in 1966 and St. James' worship was transferred to Donore Ave, the church was re-dedicated in 1988, since it was the only active church remaining in the parish of that name, effectively replacing the two other churches.

It was built to the designs of Robert John Stirling BE FRIAI, the building was extended in 1906. The stained glass windows, Hope (1915), St Catherine (1923) and St Victor (1930), were produced by the artist Michael Healy, and the stained glass window of St. Colmcille(1915), was produced by the artist Catherine O'Brien.

From 1970 parishes of St Peter (Aungier St.), St Matthias and St Audoen; St. Catherine and James Church; St Luke (The Coombe) and St Kevin (Camden Row) came under St. Patrick's Cathedral group, until 2012.

The parish was merged in 2012 with St. Audoen's to form the parish of the Parish of St Catherine and St James with St Audoen.

Beside the church is a National School, whose foundation stone was laid by the Archbishop of Dublin, in 1901, and has been similarly named St. Catherine's.

In 1963 the war memorials from St. James' Street Church were relocated to the Donore Ave. Church, as were the war memorials from St. Nicholas Without and St. Luke's Church in the Coombe. In November 2015 the war memorial from the St. Peter's Church, Aungier Street, Dublin, was restored and relocated to St. Catherine and James Church.

== See also ==
- St James' Church, Dublin (Church of Ireland)
- St Catherine's Church, Dublin (Church of Ireland)
- St. Audoen's Church, Dublin (Church of Ireland)
