= St James' Church, Dublin (Church of Ireland) =

Former church and cemetery in Ireland

St. James' Church and Cemetery
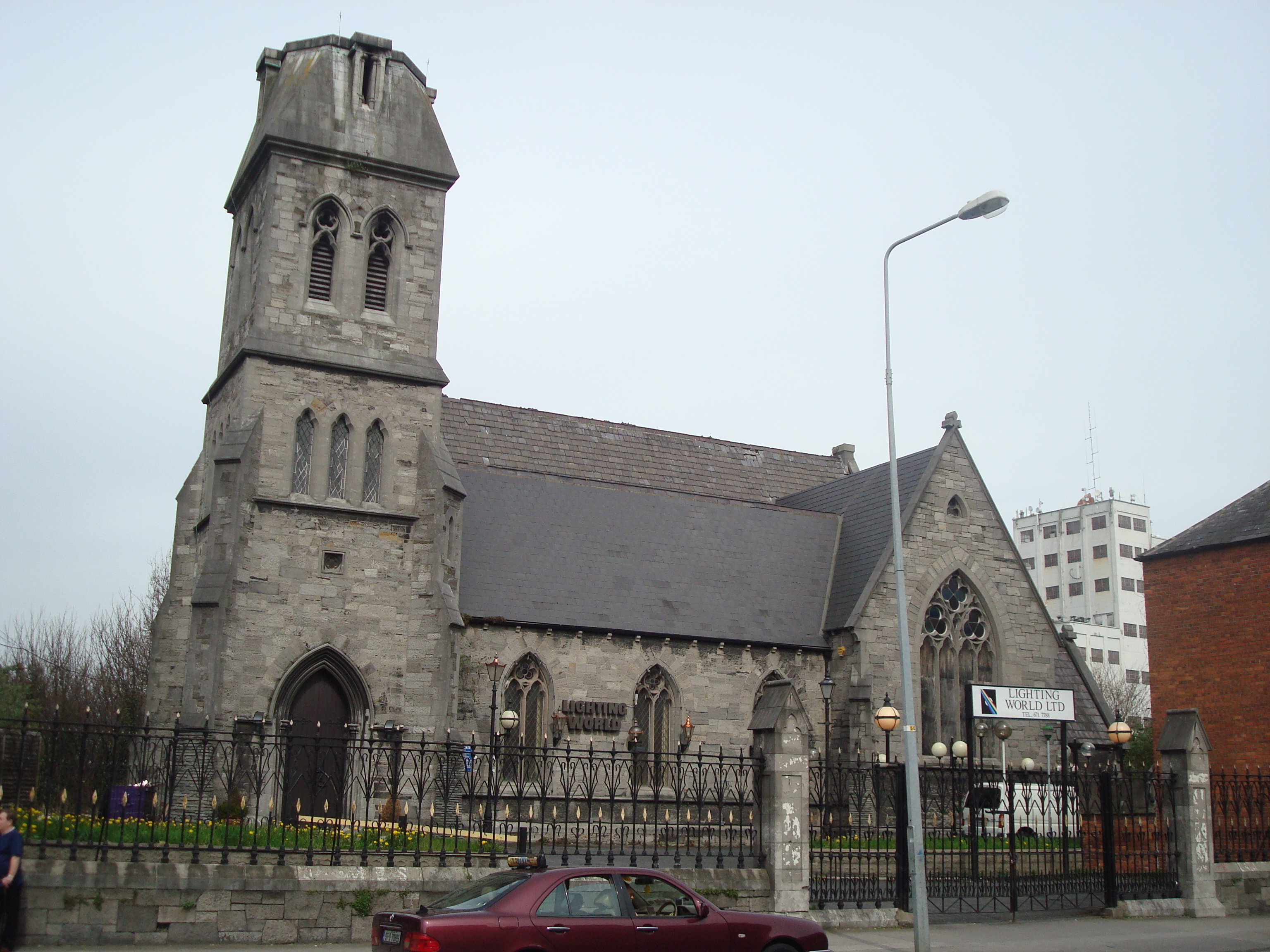

- Location within Central Dublin
- 53°20′37″N 6°17′22″W
- Location: James's Street, Dublin
- Country: Ireland
- Previous denomination: Church of Ireland

History
- Status: De-consecrated
- Founded: 1707
- Dedication: St. James

Architecture
- Functional status: Closed (private ownership, re-purposed for commercial use)

Administration
- Province: Province of Dublin
- Diocese: Diocese of Dublin and Glendalough

St. James' Church (Irish: Eaglais Naomh Séamais) is a former Church of Ireland church in James's Street, Dublin, Ireland. Established in 1707, the corresponding parish, which was separated from that of nearby St. Catherine's, was established in 1710. There had been a shrine dedicated to St. James at nearby St. James's Gate, a stopping-off point for pilgrims, since medieval times. It has been proposed that the current church is near to the site of a church to St. James of Compostella which is first referred to in the mid-13th century.

== Church ==
The existing church building dates from 1859 and was designed by Joseph Welland (1798–1860). It is the burial place of the Rev. John Ellis, for 34 years vicar of this parish, and of William Ellis, governor of Patna, India, who was killed during a war there in 1763.

In 2014, the church was bought by Pearse Lyons and converted into a distillery and visitor centre.

== History of the parishes of St. James and St. Catherine ==
=== Pre-Reformation ===
In 1177 the parish of St. James is mentioned as part of the Abbey of St. Thomas (from which Thomas St. got its name), and the Church of St. Catherine was a chapel-of-ease to the abbey. The boundaries of the parish of St. James were defined by St. Laurence O'Toole and extended right up to the city gate at Corn Market.

By the end of the 13th century the western suburbs had so increased in population that a separate parish was deemed necessary, which was provided for by splitting the parish of St. James and setting up an independent parish for St. Catherine's which was also part of the Abbey of St. Thomas.

=== Reformation and modern era ===
In 1539, Henry VIII dissolved the Abbey of St. Thomas with all other monasteries. In the surrender made by Henry Duffe, last abbot, were included "the Churches of St. Catherine and St. James near Dublin." Both churches had new curates appointed by the crown: Sir John Brace to St. Catherine's (which was shortly taken over by Peter Ledwich) and Sir John Butler to St. James.

Over the following hundred years both churches were handed over to the Church of Ireland, while Roman Catholic priests led a precarious existence tending to the much larger part of the population, which remained faithful to the Catholic church. The parish of St. Catherine appears to have been the only viable one in the area at that time - Roman Catholics eventually got the use of a chapel in Dirty Lane (now Bridgefoot Street) towards the end of the 17th century.

The Roman Catholic parish of St. James was set up in 1724, while the Church of Ireland parish of the same name came into existence in 1710. Both Church of Ireland parishes corresponded with the civil parishes of the same names.

== Cemetery ==
As of 2019, the cemetery at the church is overgrown and is not accessible to the public. It is owned by the Dublin city council, and community efforts are underway to revive the tradition of annual cleaning and decoration.

After they were hanged, drawn and quartered upon George's Hill outside the walls of Dublin in 1612, Bishop Concobhar Ó Duibheannaigh and Fr. Patrick O'Loughran of the illegal Catholic Church in Ireland were secretly buried in St. James Churchyard, where their graves became a site of Christian pilgrimage. Both were beatified by Pope John Paul II, alongside 15 other Irish Catholic Martyrs, in 1992. Their feast day is June 20.

In the centre of the cemetery is the monument of Sir Theobald Butler (1650-1720), of the Butlers of Ballyline, a prominent barrister who served as Solicitor General for Ireland and assisted in framing the articles of the Treaty of Limerick in 1691, and who advocated the Roman Catholic cause before Parliament. His monument has a Latin epitaph stating that it was erected by his eldest son "to the best of fathers." Since Butler was a Catholic, it is noteworthy that the Church of Ireland made no objection to his being buried in St. James'. The monument was restored by Colonel Augustus Butler D.L. of County Clare, his descendant in the fourth generation, in 1876.

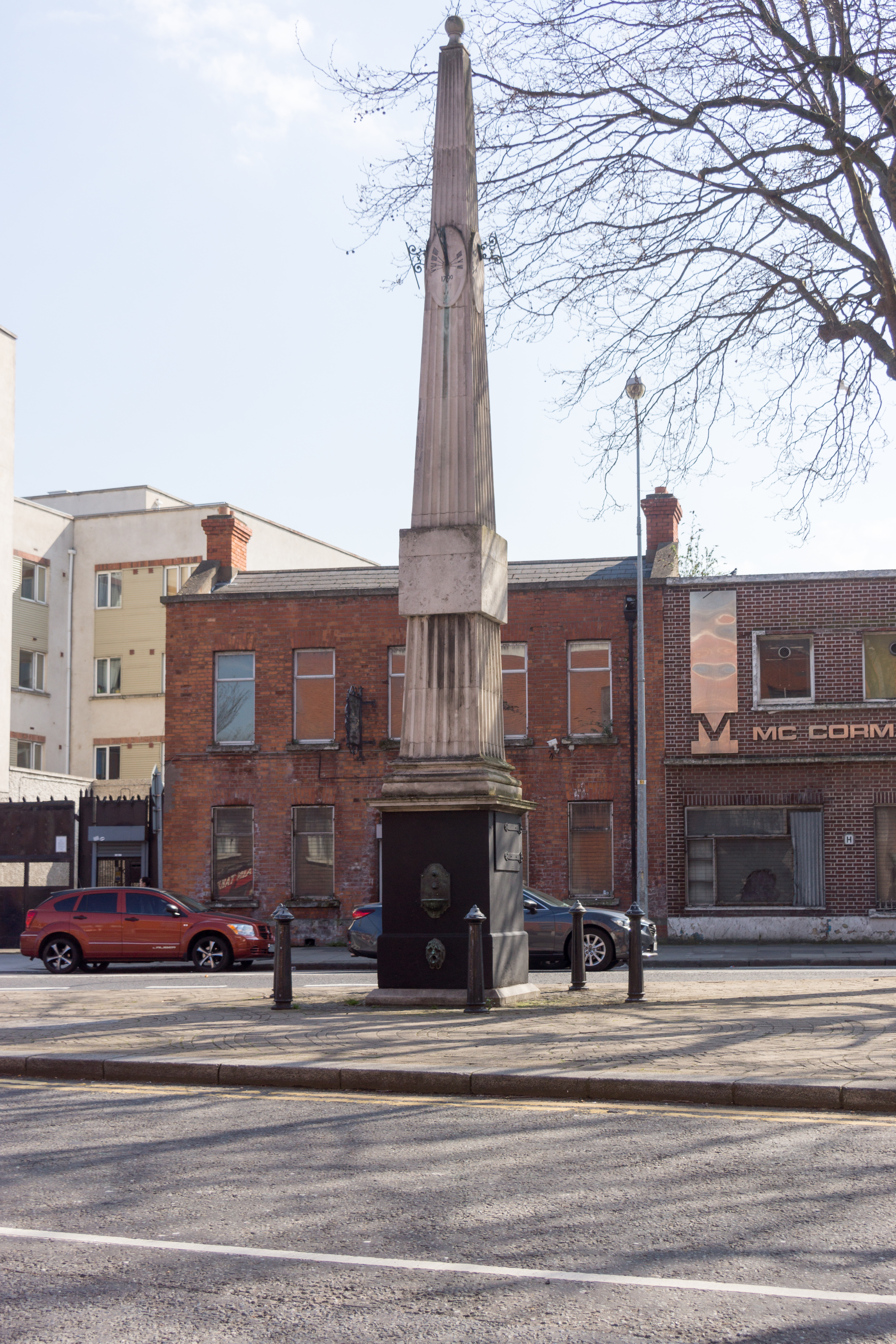
The "Fountain", built in 1790 by the Duke of Rutland

Sir Mark Rainsford, Mayor of Dublin and owner of the brewery which was sold to Arthur Guinness, was buried in St James in 1709. Also buried here is Sergeant-Major John Lucas, VC, who died 4 March 1892 and Sir William Haldane-Porter founder of the UK Immigration Service, who died in 1944.

=== Holy well and fountain ===
Across the road from the church, in the middle of the road, is "The Fountain", an obelisk with 4 sundials with a drinking fountain at its base, built in the 1780s by Charles Manners, 4th Duke of Rutland, the then Lord Lieutenant of Ireland. It was an old custom that funeral processions passing the fountain would circle it three times sunwise before carrying on to the cemetery. The fountain is said to be located on the former site of one of the holy wells of St. James which were a focus of the fair of St. James, the pattern Sunday celebration for that saint.

In his 1610 Protestant critique "A New Description of Ireland", Barnaby Rich records an outline of the holy well tradition which predates the current fountain and obelisk:

The multitude of rascall people that vseth to frequent this faire, are first accustomed to perform certaine ceremonies at S. Iames his well, in casting the water, backward and forward, on the right side and on the left, and ouer their heads; then drinking a draught of the water, they go into the Faire...

=== History ===
Although the present church only dates to the 18th century, there are records of burials as early as 1495 and it is believed that the cemetery may have been in use as early as the 13th century.

==== Cemetery decoration ====
During the Fair of St. James, which was held in James's Street, opposite the church-yard, parishioners and their families cleaned and decorated the graves with garlands and ornaments made of white paper. The fair was banned by the 1730s but continued in a smaller way next to the cemetery. The fair ended by the 1820s. In 1821, G. N. Wright wrote of a custom to "deck the graves with garlands and ornaments, made of white paper, disposed into very extraordinary forms". Nicholas Carlisle's description of the St. James cemetery decoration tradition indicates that it was already considered an old one by 1828.

== Notable parishioners ==
- Rev. James Whitelaw (1749–1813) was a clergyman at this church, before going on to St. Catherine's Church.
- Rev. Thomas Kingston, served some forty years in the parish and is buried in the graveyard.

== See also ==
- St. Catherine's Church, Dublin
- St. Catherine and James Church, Donore Ave, Dublin

== Other sources ==
- Gilbert, John (1854). A History of the City of Dublin. Oxford: Oxford University.
- George Newenham Wright (2005). "An Historical Guide to the City of Dublin, 1825". Online book. Archived from the original on 31 October 2007.
- Casey, Christine (2005). Dublin: The City Within the Grand and Royal Canals and the Circular Road with the Phoenix Park. Yale: Yale University Press. ISBN 0-300-10923-7.
- F. Elrington Ball: A History of the County Dublin. 1903. Part II.
- St. James' Graveyard, Dublin - History and Associations (Dublin, 1988)
