= Thomas Street, Dublin =

Street in Dublin, Ireland

Coordinates: 53°20′35″N 6°16′51″W

Thomas Street
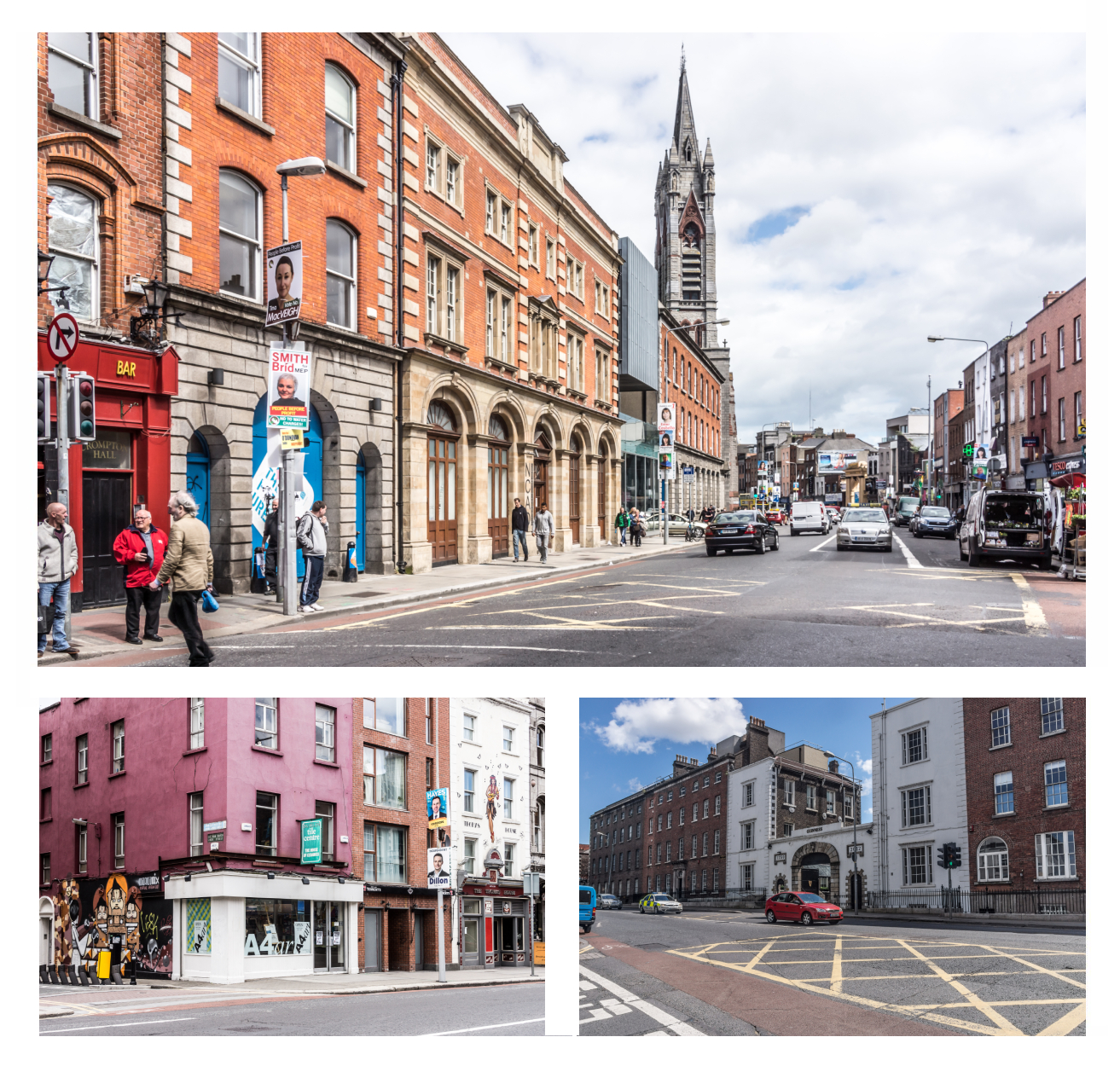
- Clockwise from top: the spire of the Church of St. Augustine and St. John; the Guinness Brewery; businesses along the street

- Location within Central Dublin
- Native name: Sráid Thomáis (Irish)
- Namesake: St. Thomas's Church (named for Thomas Becket)
- Length: 600 m (2,000 ft)
- Width: 12 metres (39 ft)
- Location: Dublin, Ireland
- Postal code: D08
- west end: James's Street
- east end: Cornmarket, St. Augustine Street, Francis Street

Other
- Known for: Saint James's Gate Brewery, John's Lane Church, execution of Wolfe Tone, Vicar Street, Variety Jones, St Catherine's Church, National College of Art and Design

Thomas Street (Irish: Sráid Thomáis) is a street in the Liberties area of central Dublin, Ireland.

== History ==
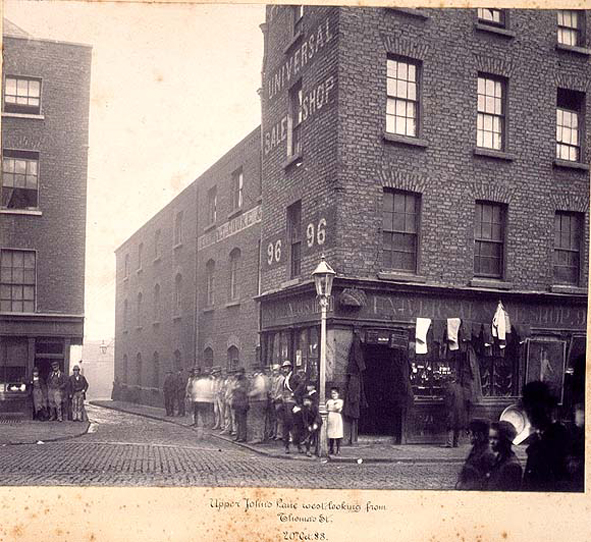
Upper Johns Lane West looking from Thomas Street

For more than a millennium, Thomas Street has served as a principal route connecting Dublin with the west, southwest and south of Ireland. It provided access to areas including west County Dublin, Kildare, west Wicklow, Carlow, Kilenny, Waterford, Wexford and as far as Cork. Historically, it was along this route that livestock and agricultural commodities, including cattle, sheep, hides, wool and grain, were transported into the city. Reflecting its importance as a commercial thoroughfare, Thomas Street became home to several markets, including the Sheep Market near St James's Church, the Glib Market, housed in a building in the middle of the street, and the Cornmarket, located where Thomas Street originally met the city wall.

The street is named after the Augustinian Abbey of St Thomas the Martyr, founded in 1177, near the later St. Catherine's church. The founder was William FitzAldelm, deputy and kinsman of King Henry II. The monastery was dedicated to Thomas Beckett (St. Thomas the Martyr), the English Archbishop of Canterbury who had recently been murdered in his cathedral by followers of the king and declared a saint by the Church. The monastery became a rich and powerful one, which controlled the Liberty of Thomas Court and Donore. In 1539, it was dissolved with all the monasteries by King Henry VIII. Over the following 150 years, the churches in the neighbourhood passed over to the reformed church, while Roman Catholic priests led a precarious existence tending to the larger part of the population, which remained faithful to the old religion.

In the medieval period, what was known as the City Watercourse supplied Dublin with water via an open channel along Thomas Street. As well as providing drinking water, it powered mills and industry, with tanning and dyeing pits lining the south side of the street "along the walls of the Manor of St Thomas." Many of Dublin's polluting, noisy or unpleasant industries, including metal smelting, was carried out in the vicinity of a street off Thomas Street named Dirty Lane (renamed Bridgefoot Street). As well as this, there were also industries of brick, smelting and pottery-making on both sides of the street, and in later times, the area developed into an important centre for milling, brewing and distilling. These activities, together with its earlier agricultural importance, contributed to the street's unusually generous width for a medieval thoroughfare, while also accounting for the considerable variations in its width along different sections.

From the mid-16th century, the Lord of this Liberty was the Earl of Meath, whose family acquired the lands of the abbey from Henry VIII when he dissolved the monasteries.

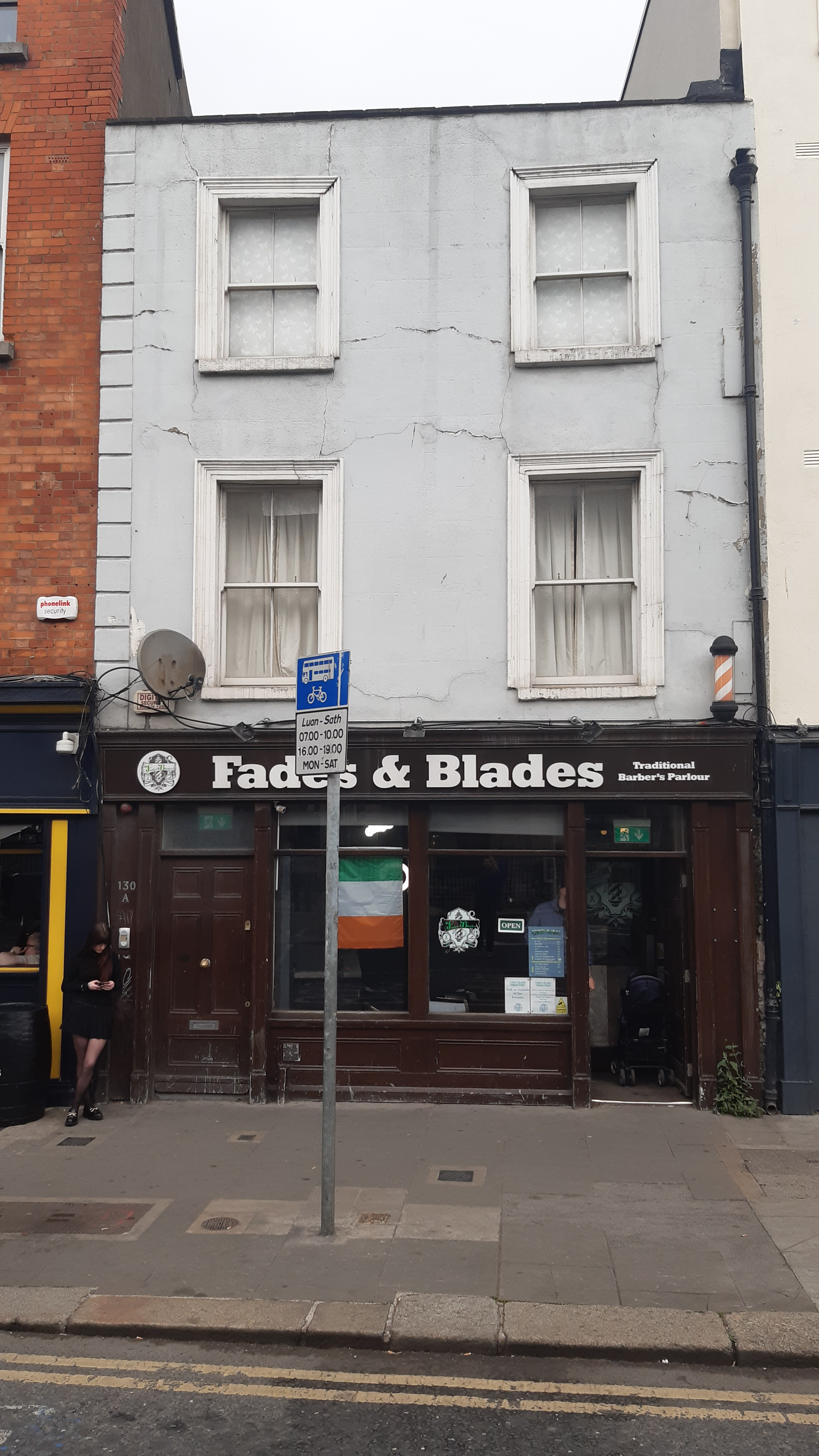
130 Thomas Street, built c.1640, is the oldest domestic dwelling in Dublin

In approximately 1640, the building now known as 130 Thomas Street was built, which remains the earliest-known domestic dwelling to have survived in Dublin city. A floor joist in the basement of the building has been dated to 1607, possibly remaining from an earlier house which occupied the same site. Internally, the building features a timber-frame structure, in which oak bressummer beams support oak cross-beams. In the mid-1960s, the building was due to be demolished as part of Dublin Corporation's proposed 'Inner Tangent Road', which was eventually dropped. It is now a protected structure.

In 1803, this street was the scene of the events surrounding the insurrection organised by Robert Emmet, where Lord Kilwarden was killed. Many of the participants in what turned out to be a riot were from this street and neighbouring streets.

== Location ==
The street runs from Cornmarket to the Saint James's Gate Brewery, where Guinness is brewed; there Thomas Street connects with James's Street.

The National College of Art and Design is located on Thomas Street, as is John's Lane Church, which has the highest steeple in the city, Vicar Street (music venue), Michelin-starred restaurant Variety Jones, St. Catherine's church where the patriot Robert Emmet was executed, as well as The Thomas House bar and venue.

Thomas Street is one of only four streets in Dublin where street trading is permitted (the other three being Wexford Street, Henry Street, and Moore Street).

== Notable persons ==
- Patrick Lynch (1916), living at number 29 of Thomas Street, he was a participant in the Easter Rising. Considered a veteran of Easter Week 1916.
- Dominic Corrigan (1802-1880), a prominent physician, was born in Thomas St., where his father had a shop selling farm tools. He was known for his original observations on heart disease.
- James Whitelaw (1749-1813), historian and statistician, was clergyman in St. Catherine's, Thomas St., when he died of a fever contracted while visiting afflicted parishioners.
- William John Fitzpatrick (31 August 1830 – 24 December 1895) was an Irish historian born on Thomas Street. s:The Times/1895/Obituary/Mr. W. J. Fitzpatrick.

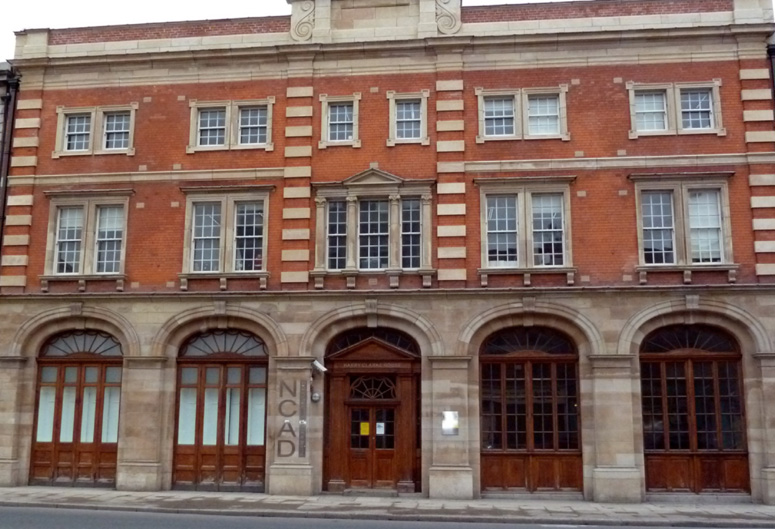
The new National College of Art and Design, formerly the fire station in Thomas St

== Fire Brigade ==
In 1907, it was planned to build a fire station on Thomas Street, to replace the makeshift station already at Winetavern Street, a proposal that had been on the table since 1898. In 1909, some city councillors moved to shelve the plans, proposing that the money be spent on paying off the Dublin Corporation's loans instead. However this motion failed to garner enough votes to pass, after a lengthy debate, and in November 1909 building of the station was finally given the go-ahead. The building was renovated in 2008 and became part of the National College of Art and Design.

== Sources ==
- Hussey, John (2020). "130 Thomas Street, Dublin's Oldest House and One Family Who Lived There". Dublin Historical Record. 73. Old Dublin Society: 45–56. ISSN 0012-6861. JSTOR 48592751.
