= John Murphy (bellfounder) =

Irish bellfounder (fl. 1837–1879)

John Murphy (fl. 1837 – 1879) was an Irish bellfounder. His foundry, which started making bells in 1843, cast bells for many churches in Ireland and elsewhere, including several rings of bells hung for change ringing.

Murphy's foundry, which carried on under his son, John J. Murphy (died 1948), continued to produce bells until 1900.

== List of towers with bells by the Murphy foundry ==
- Christ Church Cathedral, Dublin (1844, 1845, 1877. The old Rudhall ring of eight (1738) was retained, with some bells recast, and the ring was augmented to ten bells in B. The tenor was recast in 1979 by John Taylor & Co and in 1999 the bells were augmented to nineteen, the most change-ringing bells in any tower in the world.)
- St. Patrick's Cathedral, Melbourne (1852 – ring of eight bells, refurbished in 1989)
- St. Patrick's College, Maynooth (1856 – single bell)
- Church of the Immaculate Conception, Wexford (single bell in 1858, augmented to nine in 1882, recast into a ring of ten by Gillett and Johnson in 1931)
- Basilica of St. John the Baptist, St. John's (1863)
- St. Audoen's Church, Dublin (1864, 1880, both recast in 1983 by Taylor & Co)
- Thurles Cathedral (1867 – ring of eight bells, unringable)
- Cork R.C. Cathedral (1870 – ring of eight bells plus chiming bell, unringable)
- John's Lane, Dublin (1872 – ring of eight bells, augmented to ten in 1898 by Carrs of Smethwick, refurbished in 1989 by Taylor & Co)
- Mount St. Alphonsus (Redemptorist Church), Limerick (1878 – ring of eight bells, recast into a ring of ten by Taylor & Co in 1947)
- Christ Church, Glandore (1889, restored in 2012 and hung for full-circle ringing)
- Mount Temple Comprehensive School, Clontarf Dublin (Single Chiming Clock Bell with J. Murphy Founder Dublin, 1864 inscribed on the bell).
- St Patrick's Church, Rushwee, County Meath (1869 – single bell). The bell bears the inscription "J. Murphy Founder Dublin 1869" and the Latin dedication "In Honorem Nativitatis B.V. Mariae" ("In honour of the Nativity of the Blessed Virgin Mary"). A crowned Irish harp is depicted in relief on its exterior.

Church bell at Patrick's Church, Rushwee, County Meath
