= William John Fitzpatrick =

Irish historian

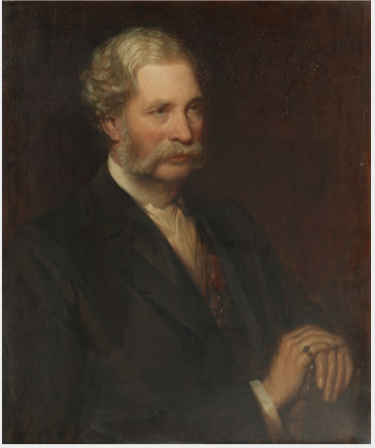
- Born: 31 August 1830
- Died: 24 December 1895
- Occupations: Historian, writer, biographer

William John Fitzpatrick (31 August 1830 – 24 December 1895) was an Irish historian.

== Life ==
He was born at Thomas Street, Dublin. His father, John FitzPatrick, was a successful merchant or trader who left his son a competence. FitzPatrick was educated first at a Protestant school, and later at Clongowes Wood College, County Kildare, the well-known Jesuit School. He early displayed a taste for recondite and somewhat morbid investigation into the secret history of eminent personages. In 1855 his first book appeared, The Life, Times, and Contemporaries of Lord Cloncurry. The style of the latter was 'puerile, involved, and turgid,' revealing a defect which the author never overcame. But his next book, The Life and Times of Bishop Doyle (1861), was much more successful, and, besides giving a vivid picture of a powerful personality, it provides a useful contribution to Irish nineteenth-century history.

On 3 November 1855, FitzPatrick commenced a series of letters to Notes and Queries, 'Who wrote the Waverley Novels ?' It was a weak attempt to foster a charge of unacknowledged plagiarism on Sir Walter Scott, and to claim for the novelist's brother, Thomas Scott, the chief credit for a large part of the famous Waverley series; but after four letters had appeared, the editor declined to publish any more. FitzPatrick continued to pursue his theory with pertinacity and in 1856 published his material as a pamphlet. It reached a second edition in the same year. His hopeless claim on behalf of Thomas Scott was repudiated in a letter to the Times of 5 June 1857 by the three daughters of that gentleman. In 1859, FitzPatrick published The Friends, Foes, and Adventures of Lady Morgan, and in 1860 Lady Morgan, her Career, Literary and Personal; these were followed by Anecdotal Memoirs of Archbishop Whately (1864).

In his Lord Edward Fitzgerald, or Notes on the Cornwallis Papers (1859), FitzPatrick first hit upon the vein of inquiry which he afterwards worked with conspicuous success of investigating the inner history of Ireland before the union. In 1866, in The Sham Squire, he followed up the story of Lord Edward FitzGerald's betrayal. Upwards of sixteen thousand copies were sold. In 1867, in Ireland before the Union, he pursued the same subject; but this volume was much less successful than its predecessor. It contains, however, some curious extracts from the privately printed diary of John Scott, 1st Earl of Clonmell.

For some years after 1867, FitzPatrick's productiveness was checked, though The Life and Times of Dr. Lanigan (1873) and The Life of Father Tom Burke (1885) proved that he had not abandoned his interest in ecclesiastical biography. A Life of Charles Lever, which appeared in 1879, was not felicitous. In 1888, however, he published The Correspondence of Daniel O'Connell, with his Life and Times, a work of exceptional value and importance. It was reviewed by Gladstone in the Nineteenth Century.

Equally valuable as a contribution to history was his Secret Service under Pitt (1892), a work involving infinite labour among the Irish State Papers of the period, and displaying, even more fully than The Sham Squire, FitzPatrick's detective skill in piecing together scattered items of evidence. This was FitzPatrick's last work of importance. In 1895, shortly before his death, he published anonymously Memories of Father [James] Healy, the well-known wit; but the book was quite unworthy of its subject, partly from the difficulty of communicating the subtle charm of Healy's personality to the printed page, and partly from the writer's defective sense of humour. A History of the Dublin Catholic Cemeteries, which he did not live to complete, was published after his death by the catholic cemeteries committee in 1900.

FitzPatrick was long actively interested in the work of the Royal Irish Academy and the Royal Dublin Society. In 1870, he was appointed honorary professor of history at the Royal Hibernian Academy of Arts. His book on O'Connell won recognition in Rome, and he received from Pope Leo XIII the insignia of the order of St. Gregory the Great. He was also accorded the honorary degree of LL.D. by the Royal University of Ireland. He served twice as high sheriff for County Longford. FitzPatrick died at his residence, 48 Fitzwilliam Square, Dublin, after a short illness.

== Works ==
- Secret Service under Pitt (1892)
