= John's Lane Church =

Church in Dublin, Ireland

Coordinates: 53°20′35″N 6°16′39″W

- St Augustine & St John's Church (John's Lane)
- Eaglais San Agaistín agus Eoin Bhaiste
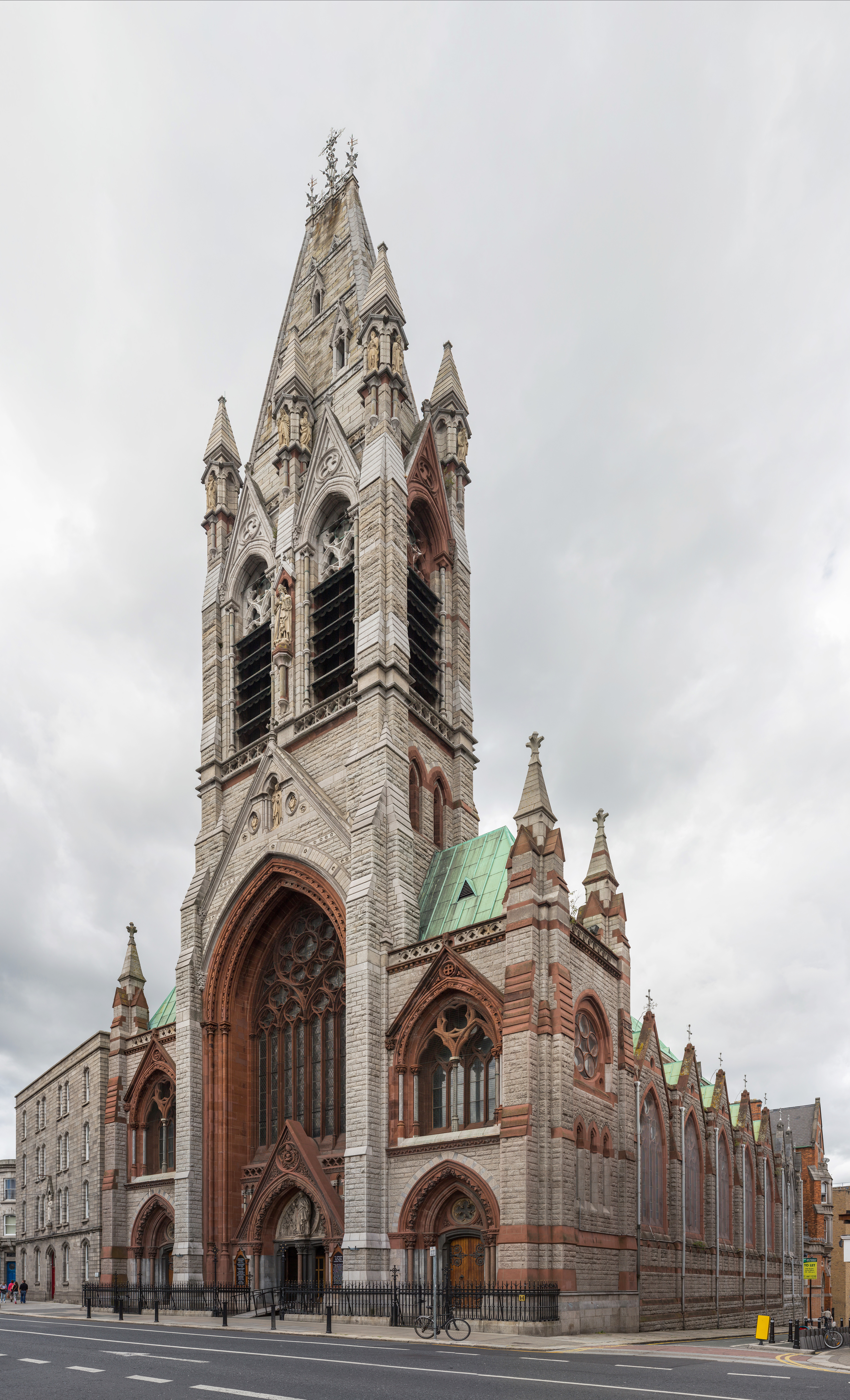
- The Church of St. Augustine and St. John the Baptist

- Location within Central Dublin
- Location: 94–96 Thomas Street; Dublin
- Country: Ireland
- Language: English
- Denomination: Catholic Church
- Sui iuris church: Latin Church
- Religious order: Order of Saint Augustine
- Website: johnslane.ie

History
- Founded: 1874
- Dedication: Augustine of Hippo and John the Baptist

Architecture
- Functional status: church/chapel
- Heritage designation: Archaeological / Historical / Social
- Architect: Edward Welby Pugin; George C. Ashlin spire - designed by William Hague
- Architectural type: Church
- Style: French Gothic Revival
- Groundbreaking: Phase I 1862 - Phase II 1892
- Completed: Phase I 1874 - Phase II 1895
- Construction cost: £ 60,000

Specifications
- Length: 50.29 metres (165 feet)
- Width: 28.34 metres (93 feet)
- Materials: Sandstone, limestone, granite, Portland stone

Administration
- Province: Irish Province of the Order of St. Augustine (O.S.A.)
- Archdiocese: Dublin
- Parish: Not a parish church

The Church of St. Augustine and St. John, commonly known as John's Lane Church, is a large Catholic church located on Thomas Street, Dublin, Ireland. It was opened in 1874 on the site of the medieval St. John's Hospital, founded c. 1180. It is served by the Augustinian Order of friars.

== History ==
The original hospital on the site was constructed by Aelred the Palmer, a Norman living in Dublin, after returning from a pilgrimage to the Holy Land. He founded a monastery of Crossed Friars under the Rule of St. Augustine who would also manage a hospital close by, the Hospital of St. John of Jerusalem. The monastery was dedicated to St. John the Baptist and stood just outside the city walls, and so was known as St. John's church without Newgate (Johannis Baptistae extra portem novem dublinensis).

In 1316 Edward Bruce marched towards Dublin at the head of his army, with the intention of besieging the city. The Dublin citizens, to prevent any danger from his approach and by common consent, set fire to Thomas Street. However, the flames laid hold of St. John's church and burned it to the ground, together with all the nearby suburbs.

The site is noted as "Johns House" on John Speed's Map of Dublin (1610).

About the commencement of the 18th century, an Augustinian Prior rented for their use as a chapel a stable on the western side of St. John's Tower, a surviving fragment of the hospital. About 1740, on the site of part of the hospital, was erected a small church 60 feet (18.3 m) by 24 feet (7.3 m), which was considerably extended 40 years later.

In 1860 it was decided to build a new church. The architect was Edward Welby Pugin, whose father was Augustus Welby Pugin, and assisted by his Irish partner and brother-in-law George C. Ashlin a native of Cork.

The remains of the medieval church were demolished and at the time there were the remains of the 'Magdalen' tower from the old church which stood where the high altar stands today.

Construction on the modern church was commenced at Easter 1862 under the leadership of Fr. Martin Crane, and it took 33 years to complete. One problem was that the foreman and many of the workmen were Fenians, who got in trouble with the authorities in 1865 and afterwards. For this reason, the church was nicknamed "The Fenian Church".

The spire, designed by William Hague, and roof were completed in 1874 when the church was opened for Masses. The exterior was completed by 1895 and the interior by 1911.

The sculptor Patrick Courtney worked on the internal altar and stone works of the church. The tradition of sculptor/stonemason has continued on down through the Courtney generations at their premises at 9 Thomas Street, and later by the sons and grandsons at Francis Street, Dublin 8.

== Church ==
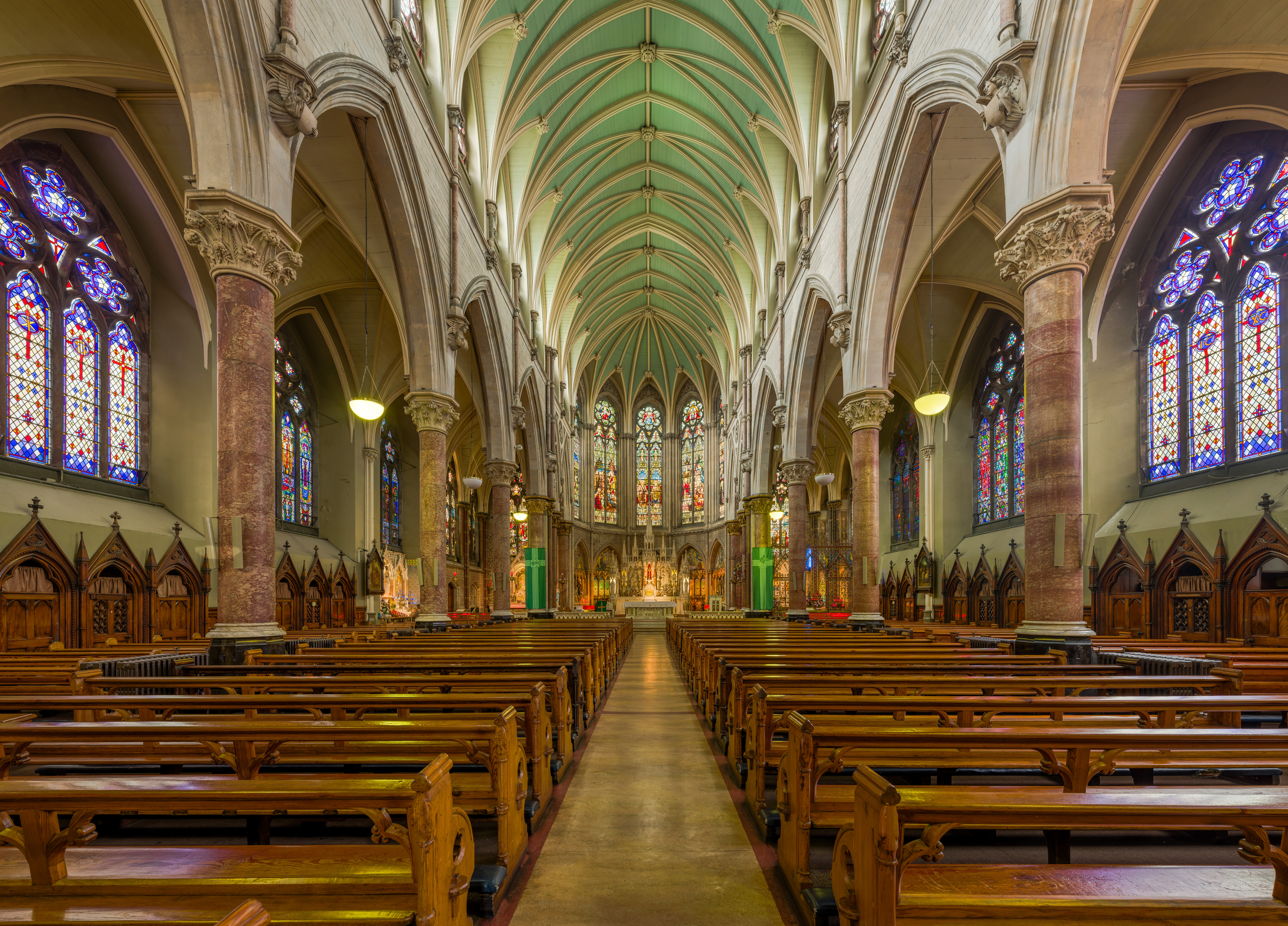
The interior

The church is named after St. Augustine and St. John the Baptist, but is popularly known as John's Lane Church, from its location at the corner of John's Lane.

The church steeple is the highest steeple in the city, standing at over 200 feet (61.0 m). It was originally not designed to hold bells, but a spiral staircase was added later to provide access to bells. The Bell Ringers Company of John's Lane was formed in 1872 and the bells were first rung on St. Patrick's Day 1873.

The twelve statues in the niches on the tower are the work of James Pearse, father of Patrick Pearse and Willie Pearse. The stained glass in the apse is by Mayer of Munich. The windows are by the Harry Clarke studio and Michael Healy.

== Bells ==
There is a peal of ten bells hung in the tower, weighing 22 long hundredweight, 3 quarters and 2 pounds, and in the key of D-flat. The bells were cast by John Murphy of Dublin in 1872 as a ring of eight and installed that year. They were augmented to ten in 1898 with two more bells cast by Charles Carr of Smethwick. The tower was not originally intended to hold bells, and therefore access is via an open iron staircase which was added later, and which looks out into the nave of the church. The bells are now rung every Sunday morning.

== Notable Friars ==
Professor & Fr. F. X. Martin (O.S.A.), Chairman of the Friends of Medieval Dublin 1976–1983, and Chairman of the Dublin Historic Settlement Group, tried in vain to save the Viking remains in nearby Wood Quay.

== See also ==
- Church of St. John the Evangelist, Dublin
