= James's Street, Dublin =

Street in Dublin, Ireland

Coordinates: 53°20′35″N 6°17′26″W

James's Street
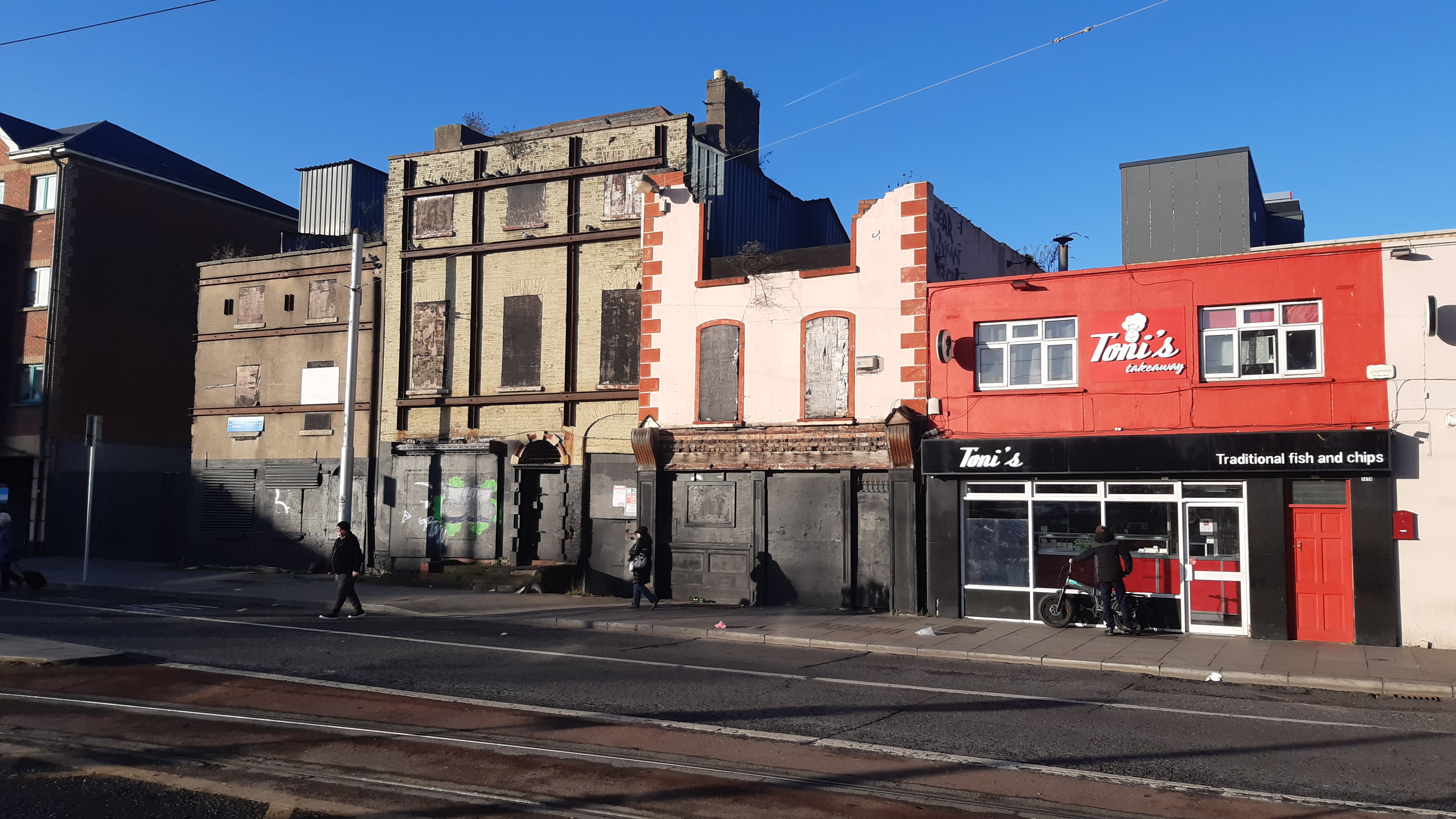
- Buildings, some disused, on James's Street in 2026

- Location within Central Dublin
- Native name: Sráid San Séamas (Irish)
- Former name: Saint James's Street
- Length: 740 m (2,430 ft)
- Width: 12 metres (39 ft)
- Location: Dublin, Ireland
- Postal code: D08
- west end: Mount Brown
- east end: Thomas Street

Other
- Known for: St James' Church (Church of Ireland); St James' Church (Roman Catholic); St. James's Hospital; St. James's Gate

James's Street (Irish: Sráid San Séamas) is a street in the Liberties area of central Dublin, Ireland. Originally the location of one of the medieval city gates of Dublin, St. James's Gate, it has been the home of St. James's Gate Brewery since the 18th century.

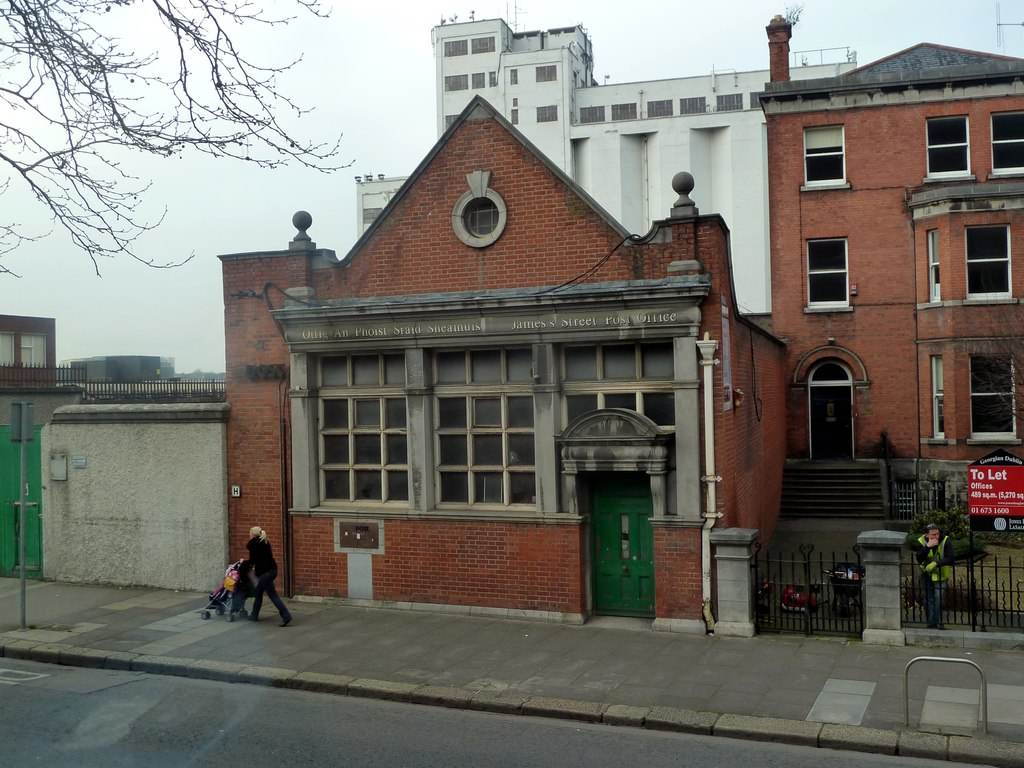
Former James's Street Post Office

The street runs from approximately the steps of Cromwell's Quarters and Mount Brown to the junction with Watling Street and Thomas Street. The street is a continuation of High Street and the ancient Slighe Mhór out of the city to the west.

== History ==
St. James's Gate, located on the modern James's street, was the western entrance to the city during the Middle Ages. During this time the gate was the traditional starting point for the Camino pilgrimage from Dublin to Santiago de Compostela in Galicia (Spain). The area has been a departure point for the Irish pilgrims since at least the year 1220.

The street and gate appear numbered and annotated on John Speed's Map of Dublin (1610).

Though the gate was demolished in 1734, the name is still used for the surrounding area, and in particular for the St. James's Gate Brewery which was taken over by Arthur Guinness in 1759.

The Record of Protected Structures, maintained by Dublin City Council, includes a number of buildings and structures on James's Street. These include several buildings associated with St. James's Gate Brewery and St. James's Hospital, St James' Catholic Church, the former St James' Church of Ireland church and the areas former post office. A fountain obelisk and sundial near Bow Lane West designed by Francis Sandys and built in 1790, is also protected and located near the junction with Steeven's Lane.

St James Catholic Church, built in 1852, is the home of the Camino Society of Ireland, providing information on the Camino de Santiago pilgrimage.

An internal railway for the Guinness brewery existed under the street in the past, but is now closed off, however a pedestrian tunnel connecting Guinness plant on either side of street still exists.

The roasting of barley at St. James's Gate Brewery for the production of Guinness, which produces a "coffee-like pungency", creates an aroma in the James's street and wider Liberties area that is very noticeable, and has been noted by The Irish Times as one of the "quintessential smells of Dublin."

== In popular culture ==
The 18th century obelisk on James's Street, with inset sundials, is mentioned in James Joyce's novel Ulysses.

As part of a 1966 TV special named A Little Bit of Irish, singer Bing Crosby sang amongst the keeves and vats at the Guinness Brewery in James's Street with the Guinness Choir.

The interjection "James's Street!" is sometimes used as an euphemistic alternative to "Jesus Christ!".

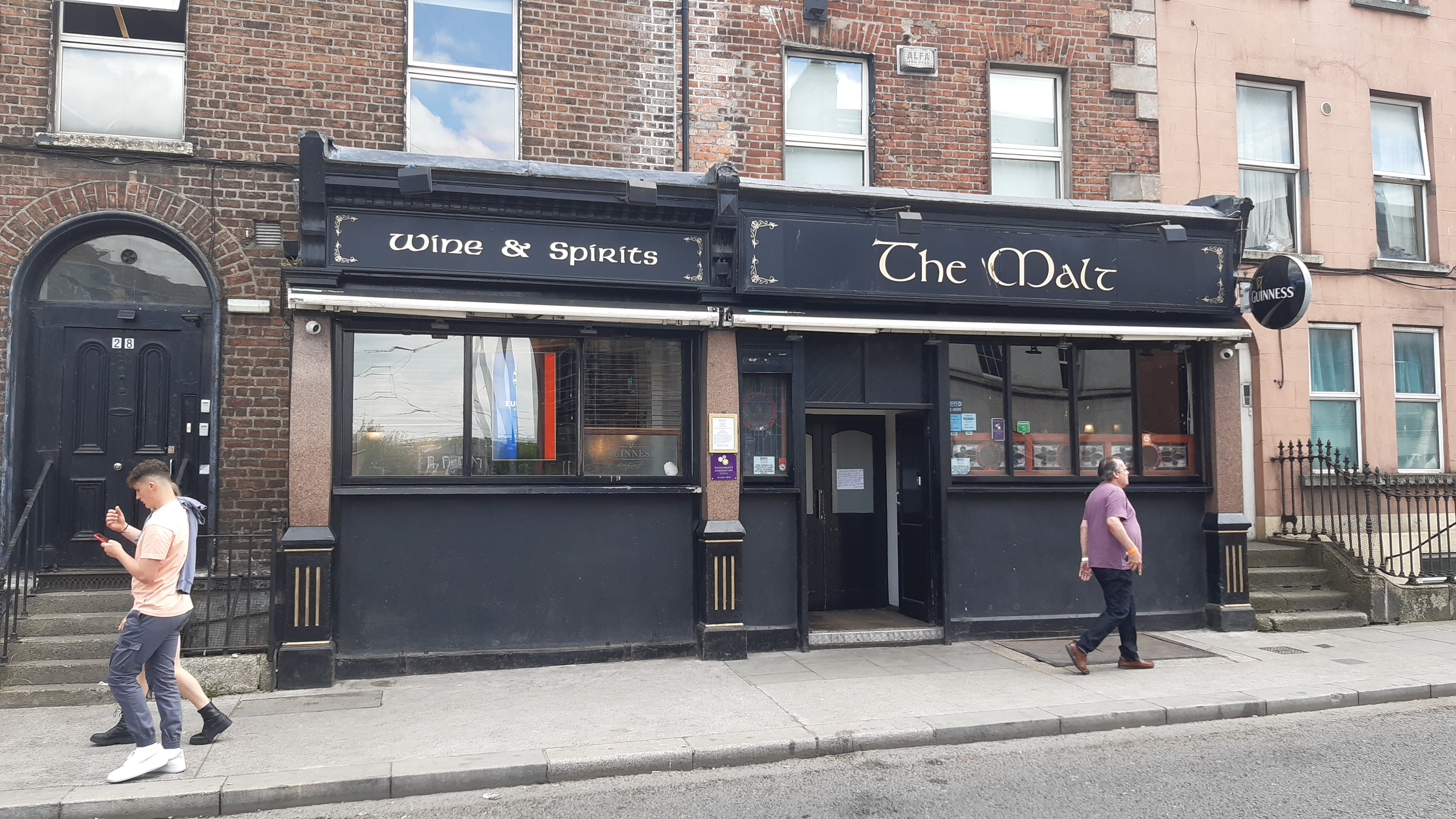
The Malt aka The Malt House, a pub on the street

== Notable people ==
- James "Lugs" Branigan (1910–1986), well-known member of the Garda Síochána in the 1950/60s and proponent of 'tough justice', was born at 1 James's Street
- Cian Byrne (born 2003), professional footballer who plays as a defender for League of Ireland Premier Division club Bohemians, grew up on the street
- James Carey (1845–1883), a member of the Irish National Invincibles involved in the 1882 Phoenix Park Murders, was born on James's Street
- Philip Cosgrave (1884–1923), Cumann na nGaedheal politician who served as a TD in Dáil Éireann from 1921 to 1923, was born at 174 James's Street
- W. T. Cosgrave (1880–1965), first president of the Executive Council of the Irish Free State, was born on James's Street
- Brendan Grace (1951–2019), comedian, lived at 2E Echlin Street, off James's Street, in the early 1960s
- Jim Lockhart (born 1948), member of Horslips
- William Haldane Porter (1867–1944), British civil servant, who was responsible for the creation of the Aliens Branch of the Home Office, lived with his wife at 98 James's Street in the final years of their life
- Mark Rainsford (1651/1652–1709), Lord Mayor of Dublin and the owner of what was to later become the Guinness Brewery died at a house on the street
- Mark Sheehan (1976–2023), musician with the band The Script, was originally from the James's Street area
