= St James Catholic Church, Dublin =

St James' Church
- Eaglais San Séamas
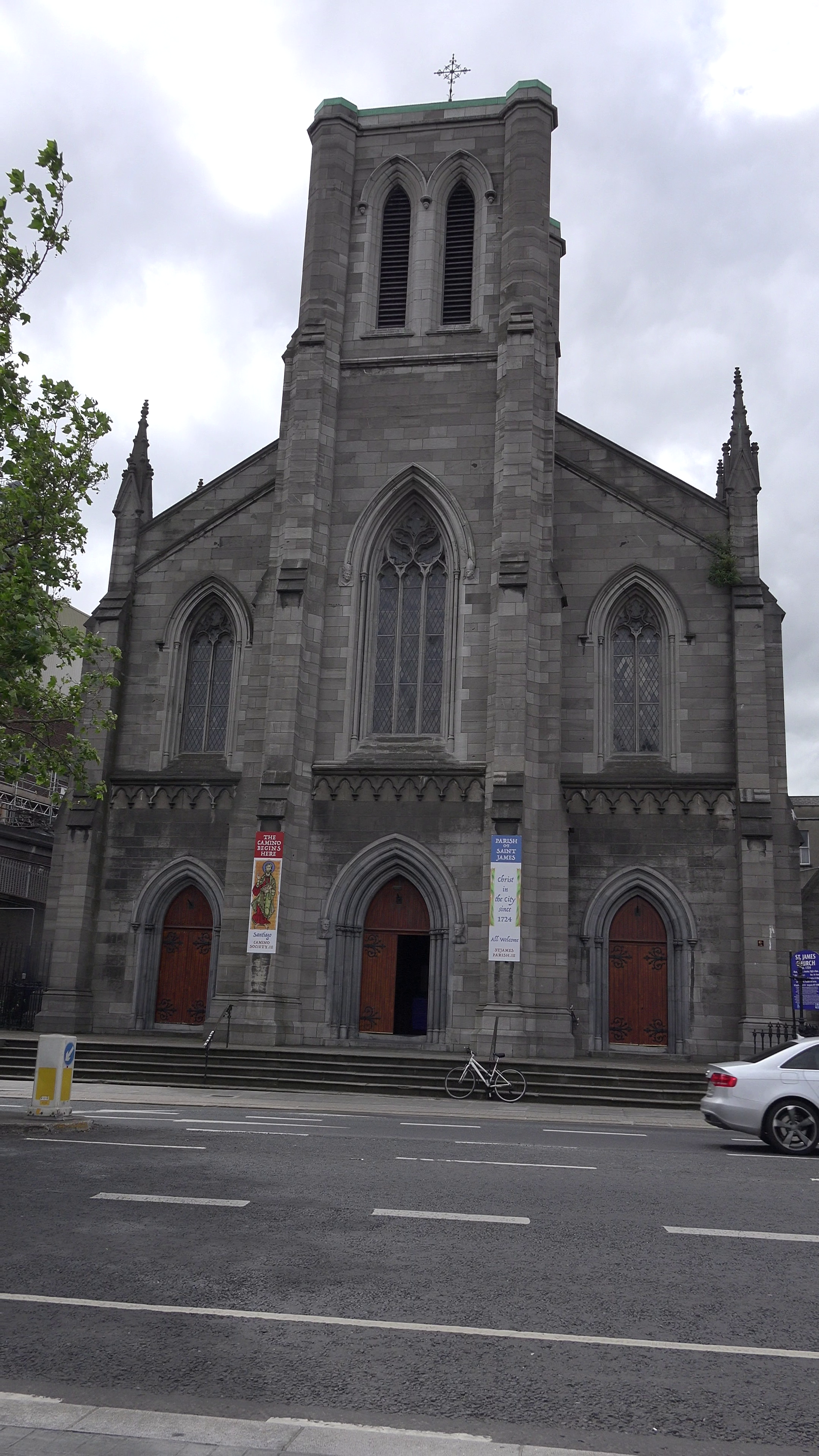
- Facade

- Location within Central Dublin
- 53°20′35″N 6°17′16″W
- Location: James's Street North, Dublin
- Country: Ireland
- Language: English
- Denomination: Catholic
- Tradition: Roman Rite
- Website: stjamesparish.ie

History
- Status: parish church
- Founded: 1842
- Dedication: James the Greater

Architecture
- Functional status: Active
- Architectural type: Gothic Revival
- Completed: 1852

Administration
- Archdiocese: Dublin
- Deanery: South City Centre
- Parish: Saint James'

St. James' Catholic Church in Dublin, Ireland is church on James's Street, Dublin, Ireland, built in 1852. It and the neighbouring St. James's Church and Cemetery are both located on St. James's Street or James's Street.

St. James' Church is the home of the Camino Society of Ireland, providing information on the Camino de Santiago pilgrimage. Nearby St. James's Gate has been a departure point for the Irish pilgrims since the year 1220.

== See also ==
- St James' Church, Dublin (Church of Ireland)
