= Ship Street Little =

Street in Dublin, Ireland

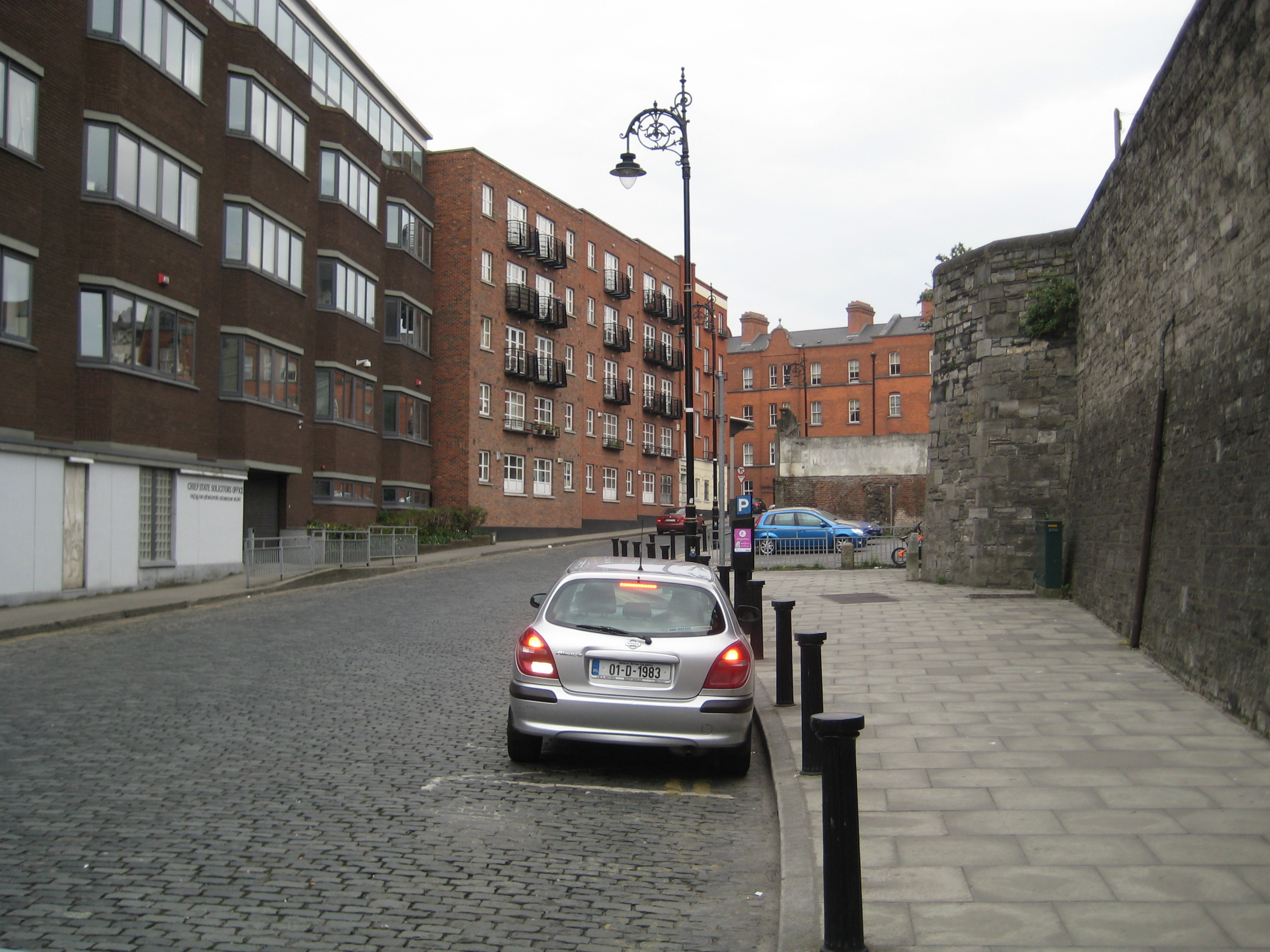
- A view westwards towards the junction with Bride Street

- Location within Central Dublin
- Native name: Sráid na gCaorach Bheag (Irish)
- Former name: Poole Street
- Namesake: Sheep
- Location: Dublin, Ireland
- Postal code: D08
- Coordinates: 53.342308°N 6.269007°W
- West end: Bride Street; Werburgh Street
- East end: Ship Street Gate; Ship Street Barracks; Cole's Alley (Castle Steps); Ship Street Great

Ship Street Little (Irish: Sráid na gCaorach Bheag, meaning 'Sheep Street') is a street on the south side of Dublin, Ireland which stretches from the junction of Werburgh Street and Bride Street in the west to the corner with Ship Street Great and Cole's Alley in the east and is bookended by the Ship Street Gate of Dublin Castle in the east.

The street is bounded to its north side by the city walls of Dublin which was first constructed c1250 as part of the early defences of Anglo-Norman Dublin.

Running parallel and perpendicular to the street to the south and also containing a dog-leg corner is Chancery Lane.

== History ==
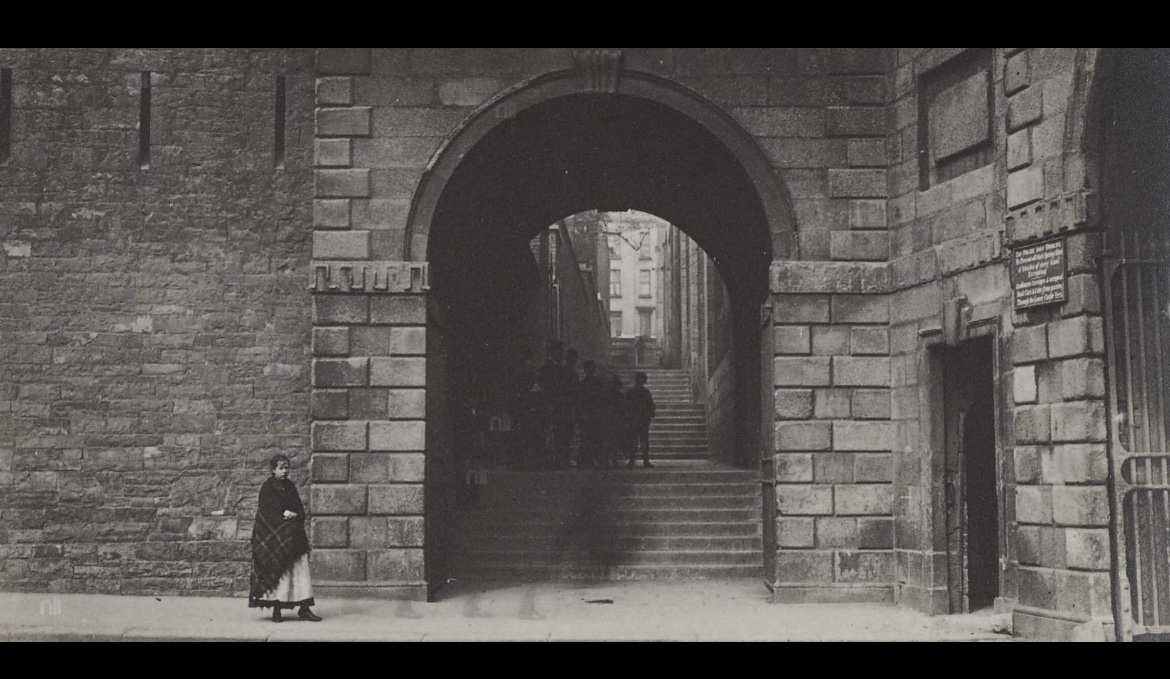
Cole’s Alley, Ship Street Gate

In medieval times the area would have been located just outside of the city walls and was referred to as Poole Street.

The River Poddle flowed along the side of the street, around the city walls and into the Dubh Linn (Black Pool) which gave Dublin its name. It also acted as a form of moat for the castle.

The Pole mill was also situated near the corner of Bride Street, Werburgh Street and Ship Street Little. It was one of several mills in the area which used water diverted from the Poddle. This was also the site of what was sometimes called Pole gate or St Werburgh's gate, one of the Gates of the city of Dublin. The Church of St Michael le Pole was also located between Chancery Lane and Ship Street until it fell out of use in the second half of the 17th century and its round tower was taken down at the end of the 18th century. In both circumstances the name Pole takes its name from the Pool.

Later, a sheep market would have taken place in the vicinity giving rise to its modern name.

St Bride's School teachers' residence moved to the street in 1746.

An area near the street is referenced as "Shepe Strete" on John Speed's Map of Dublin (1610). By the time of John Roque's map of 1756, the street is firmly referred to as Little Ship Street.

=== 19th century ===
Around 1807 the Ship Street gate and guard house of Dublin castle were built to the design of Francis Johnston.

By the 19th century, the street had become mainly occupied by tenements and commercial traders owing to its proximity to Dublin Castle and the associated barracks.

In 1829, the wide streets commissioners set out plans for the construction of houses and shops on the North side of the street adjacent to a portion of the city wall which had become obsolete.

After catholic emancipation from around 1840 until 1930, a large Italian community moved into the area between Ship Street Little, Werburgh Street, Bride Street and Chancery Lane. The Italian community was divided into two groups: one primarily from the Lucca region who were "artisans, plaster workers and woodworkers", and the second from Valle di Comino who were "street-sellers of ice cream or cafe owners".

=== 20th century ===
By the 20th century, with the move of the ascendancy and middle classes into the suburbs, the street had degraded and was mostly in tenements by the beginning of the 20th century except for a few remaining factories and workshops. All of the buildings on the North side of the street had been demolished by the end of the 20th century.

=== 21st century ===
In 2012, an emergency archaeological dig following a large depression in the stone setts on the street discovered the location of the original River Poddle culvert dating to the later 17th century, sometime after 1678.

As of 2024, the street contains offices and apartments along its southern side while the Northern side remains empty with the remnants of the city wall exposed. This section of the wall appears on some maps as Cole's bastion.

In October 2024, significant archaeological works began on the street and on the area of nearby Hoey's Court and Werburgh Street. The area has been referred to as "most important archaeological resource in the city of Dublin".

The Chief State Solicitor's Office coming under the auspices of the Attorney General of Ireland is also located on the street.

== See also ==
- St. Bride's Church, Dublin
- Golden Lane, Dublin
- Ship Street Barracks
