= Bride Road =

Street in Dublin, Ireland

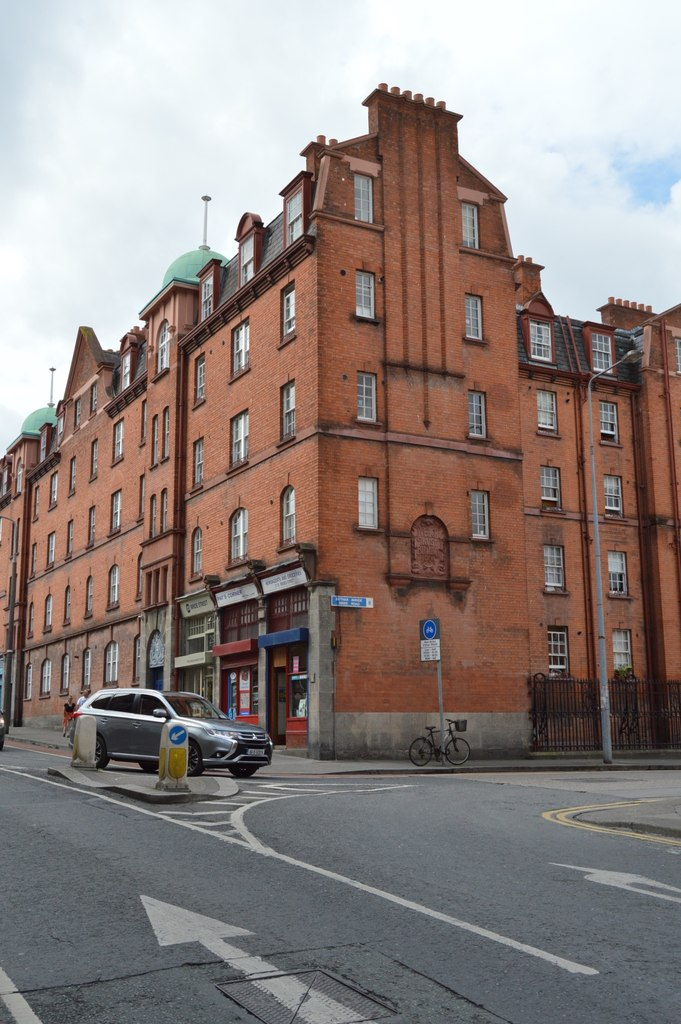
- Bride Road, as seen from Patrick Street

- Location within Central Dublin
- Native name: Bóthar Bhríde (Irish)
- Former name: Bride's Alley
- Namesake: Named after a church dedicated to Brigit of Kildare
- Location: Dublin, Ireland
- Postal code: D08
- Coordinates: 53.3415°N 6.2710°W
- East end: Bride Street
- West end: Patrick Street

Bride Road (Irish: Bóthar Bhríde) is a street in the medieval area of Dublin, Ireland.

== Location ==
Bride Road runs from Bride Street to the east to Patrick Street to the west, and parallel with Bull Alley Street.

== History ==
Bride Road was previously known as Bride's Alley. In the earlier 1800s, a large number of cabinet-makers lived on the street. Earlier, this area had a Quaker community, with one of their houses being on Bride Road.

Iveagh House, now known as Iveagh Hostel, was built on the street in the 1900s. It was part of the Iveagh Trust regeneration scheme. It was originally built as a hostel for single, homeless men, with 508 beds available. The accompanying Iveagh Baths was also built at this time.

Three of the series of plaques created by artist Chris Reid are on Bride Street, with quotes from local residents of the area.

=== Iveagh Hostel ===
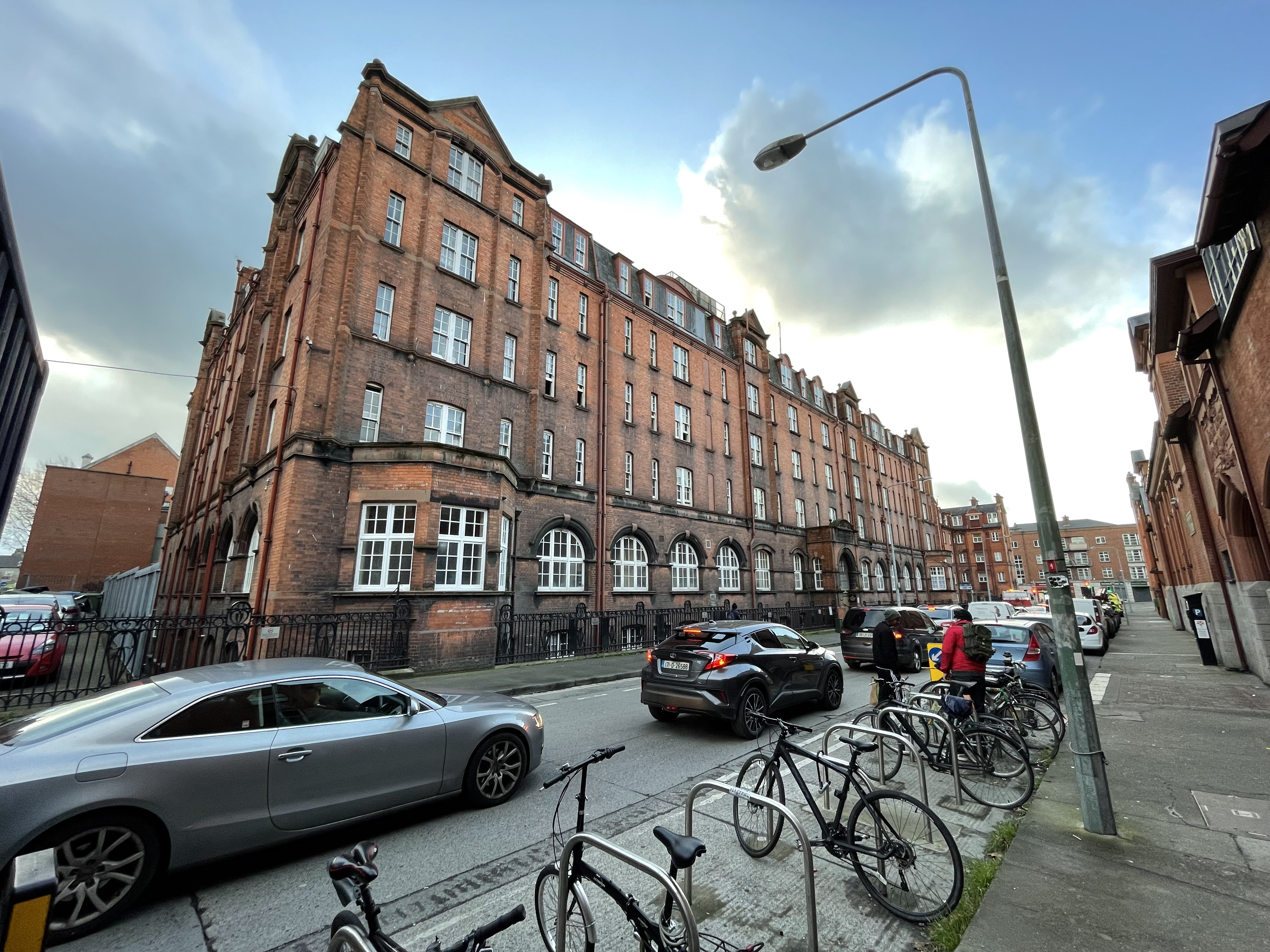
Iveagh Hostel, as seen from Bride Rd

The Iveagh Hostel had 508 cubicles and many more facilities such as dining rooms, smoking rooms, reading rooms and a barber shop. The Hostels guide to ethos was non-denominational, residents had a right to privacy and their preaching. The original hostel was based on the idea of cheap hotels which would give men a half decent place to live and so work.

From 1909 to 1926 the cost of a nights lodging in the hostel came to 7d, a weeks 3/6. Between 1926 and 1940, it raised to 10d and 5/6. Current prices have been increased with 21.80 euro and 113.40 euro which includes 4 meals a day, use of laundry facilities, computer room, a fitness room and light cooking facilities.

Nowadays the original 508 cubicles are now 195 bedrooms with 44 rooms for emergency accommodation and the rest semi-permanent or permanent residents used for people hoping to gain private or city council accommodation.

=== Iveagh Baths ===
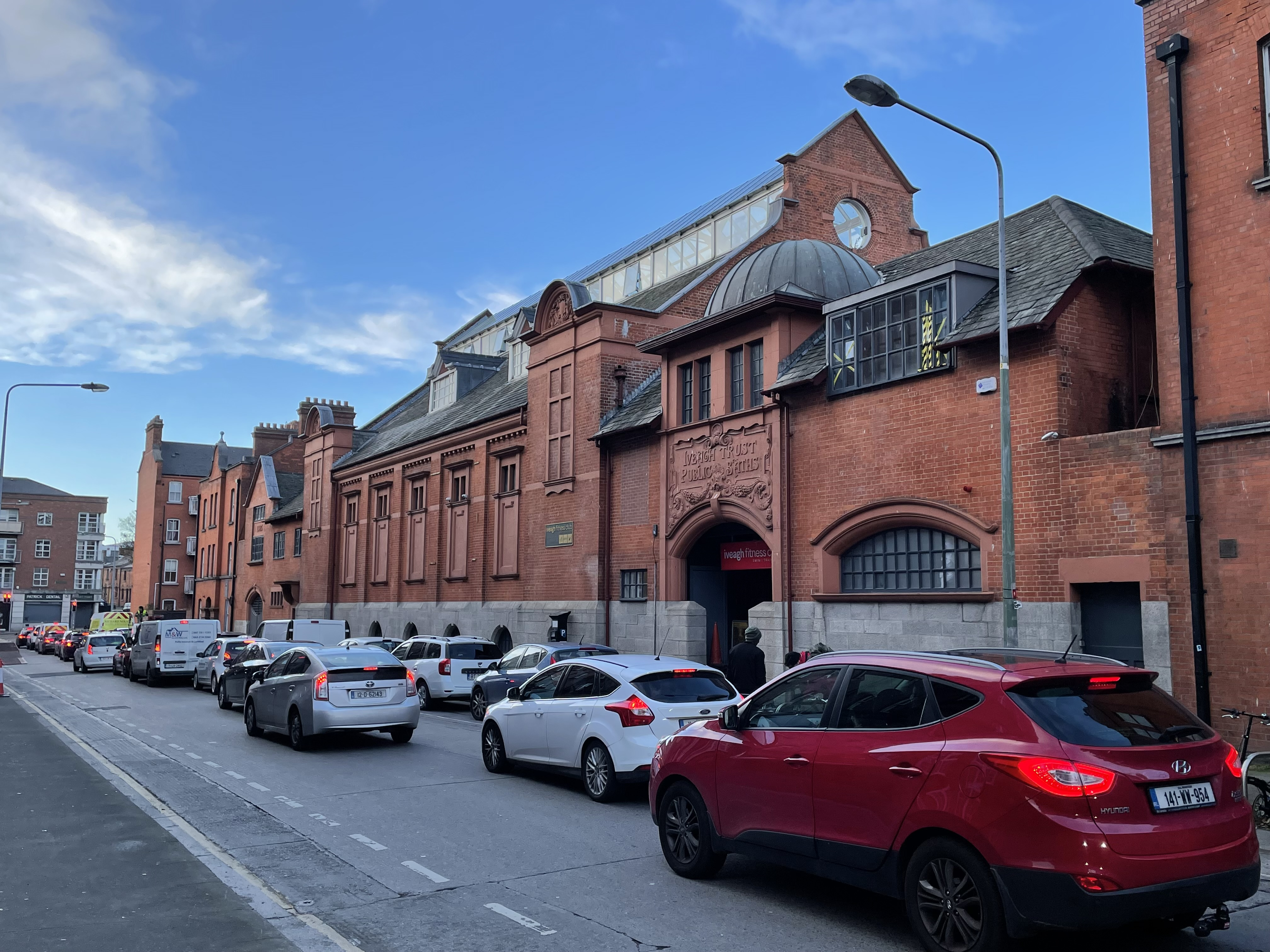
Iveagh Public Baths, as seen from Bride Rd

Located directly opposite The Iveagh Hostel, the building was constructed with red brick, sandstone and granite, a pine roof, steel principles and white tiles inside forming the wall. The swimming pool was 65 x 30 feet with white tiles like the walls and its shallow end of 3 feet 6 inches and deepest of 6 feet. In addition to the swimming pool baths were also added. They consisted of 27 baths, 18 for men and 9 for women, both hot and cold baths. 47 changing rooms were installed at opposite ends of buildings to enforce the segregation of the sexes. There were shower baths, foot paths and lavatories. As well as the use of the baths for the public the baths were used by the Dublin Swimming Club (TCD), the Boys Brigade Dublin Battalion, St Andrews College Swimming Club, the City of Dublin YMCA all hosting swimming galas.

The Iveagh Baths opened on 6 June 1906 and was in line with the 19th century philanthropic philosophy of social reform. the baths promoted hygiene, ridded the smell of the poor and cleansed the public physically but aimed to reform the poor morally. Bathing was seen as a middle class leisure activity and now lower class people were participating showing the infiltration of middle class ideals into the lower classes. The Iveagh Baths were later sold to Dublin Corporation in 1951.

== Architecture ==
The most prominent feature on the street is the Dublin Corporation flats, dating from around 1900. The more decorative structures on the street were built by the Iveagh Trust but the more austere neighbors of the Dublin Corporation flat scheme began slightly earlier.

== Housing scheme ==
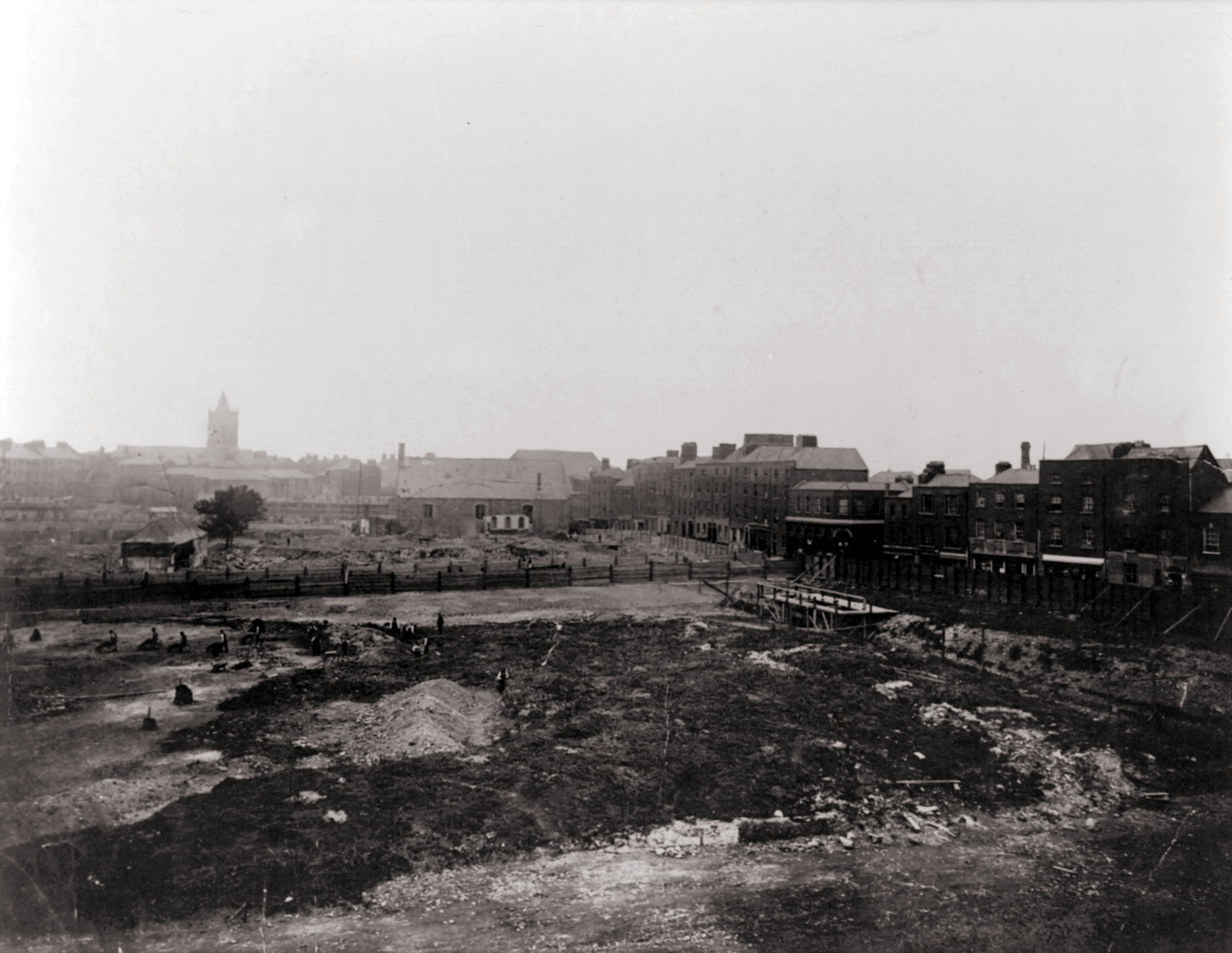
Slum clearance of the area circa 1900

In 1890 the area of Christchurch Place and St. Patrick's Cathedral had fallen into decay which was a concern to the Wood Quay Ratepayers Protection Society as business was impacted due to dereliction, migration of the wealthy and immigrants having no income. The area was seen as an eyesore, as Bull Alley houses collapsed and were in decay. Dublin Corporation were not isolated from the area as they cleared sites but did not have the funds to build. People demanded action and a meeting was organized in 1895, Thomas Drew stated that planning was needed and not 'hole and corner' planning.

=== First plan ===
The first plan for the housing scheme would cost £68,000, a rental of £1,903, consisted of 60 dwellings and 128 families would be housed. The Dublin Corporation recognized that these buildings were not the best The buildings would be a mixture of houses and flats.

The plan included:

- Type A, 15 Self Contained Houses, each of 3 storeys, shop on ground floor and big houses with 7 rooms
- Type B, 16 buildings in flats, each of 3 storeys, 3 families in each, 2 rooms per family
- Type C, 10 buildings in flats, each of 3 storeys, shop on ground floor, three families per building. A shop and 2 rooms on the ground floor, 2 rooms on the first and second floor
- Type D, 2 buildings in flats, each of 2 storeys, 2 families in each house, 2 rooms each
- Type E, 9 self contained houses, 1 family and four rooms each
- Type F, 6 buildings in flats, each of 3 storeys, 3 families and 3 rooms each
- Type G, 2 buildings in flats, each of 2 storeys, 2 families and 3 rooms each.

The plan was reconsidered in 1898 and was simplified considerably with all houses being converted to flats.

=== Final plan ===
In 1903 the Dublin Corporation passed this motion on 7 December 1903. The Second plan consisted of 29 houses or blocks, all to be flats, would house 210 families, 112 were to be 3 room flats and 98 were to be two room flats. This motion was passed with a couple of late changes. Changes were made to the plan with consequences for landlords if the upkeep of the building was not maintained. This included, landlords promised to keep buildings sanitary and fit for human habitation. If these rules were broken the building would be closed and demolished at the expense of the landlord.

The plan included:

- Type A, 11 blocks, each of 4 storeys with 8 families in 3 roomed flat
- Type B, 7 blocks, each of 4 storeys with 8 families in 3 roomed flat
- Type C, 7 blocks, each of 4 storeys with 6 families in 2 roomed flat
- Type D, 4 blocks, each of 4 storeys with 6 families in 2 roomed flat.

Late changes were made with 5 Type B blocks to be converted to swimming baths, Iveagh Baths.

=== Reports of housing scheme ===
Reports showed that flats had social benefits to the area. That rents could not match the expenses, and flats were expensive to manage because tenants left for cottages as soon as they could as they were more desirable. There was a growing acceptance that flat blocks were not as attractive as cottages.
