= Golden Lane, Dublin =

Street in Dublin, Ireland

Golden Lane
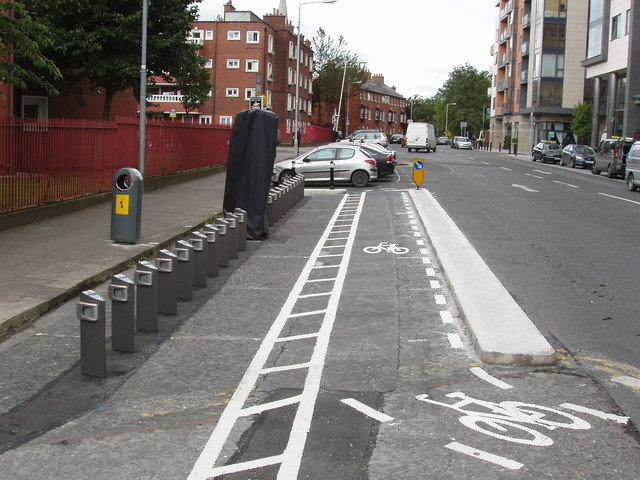
- A Dublinbikes stand on Golden Lane

- Location within Central Dublin
- Native name: Lána an Óir (Irish)
- Former name: Cross Lane
- Namesake: Goldsmiths
- Length: 150 m (490 ft)
- Width: 28 metres (92 ft)
- Location: Dublin, Ireland
- Postal code: D08
- Coordinates: 53°20′26″N 6°16′07″W
- west end: Bride Street, Bull Alley Street
- Major junctions: Stephen Street
- east end: Johnson Place

Golden Lane (Irish: Lána an Óir) is a street on the Southside of Dublin city. It runs from Bride Street in the west to Longford Street and Stephen Street in the east. It is intersected by Ship Street Great, Whitefriar Street and Chancery Lane.

It is one of the oldest streets in Dublin outside of the old city gates and walls, dating from at least 1466. It was originally named Cross Lane and is shown as such on John Speed's map of Dublin of 1610. This changed around the time the Goldsmith's Guild moved to Goldsmith's Hall at 22 Golden Lane in 1812 however the Golden Heart pub was also located on the street in the 18th century as well as a number of other goldsmiths. From 1709 to 1812 Goldsmith's Hall was located on nearby Werburgh Street.

As of 2023, none of the original pre-20th century buildings remain on the street above ground level.

== History ==
=== Church of St Michael le Pole ===
The street was close to the site of the Church of St Michael le Pole at the time Norse invaders arrived in the 9th and 10th centuries. The church was located off Golden Lane between Ship Street Great and Chancery Lane.

The building was deconsecrated in 1682 following the uniting of the parishes of St Michael Le Pole, St Stephen and St Bride, and in 1706 it became a school. The round tower of the church lasted for almost 700 years until It was damaged in a storm in 1775 and was taken down.

=== Early Scandinavian Dublin ===
The street was occupied in Viking times, as it is near the Dubh Linn, the black pool which gave Dublin its name. It was also at one of the highest points in the city near Dublin Castle and hence would have been a natural defensive position. Various Viking burials and artefacts have been found near the original street line.

=== Post-1700 ===
In the 18th century, the street was mainly residential, containing the houses of educated and professional persons and merchants from the city proper. A gatehouse referred to as "Whitefriars gatehouse" is detailed on the street on John Roque's 1756 map of Dublin. In 1790, the architect Francis Sandys designed a fountain on the street to match other fountains which he designed on James Street and the Rutland Fountain on Merrion Square, both of which are still in existence.

By 1862, the street was dominated by cobblers as well as some of the residual businesses related to the gold trade. By the early 20th century, the street, along with much of the inner city, was in decline with much of the street recorded as tenements in the 1901 census. The last of the original Georgian and pre-Georgian houses were demolished in the 1980s.

== Notable residents ==
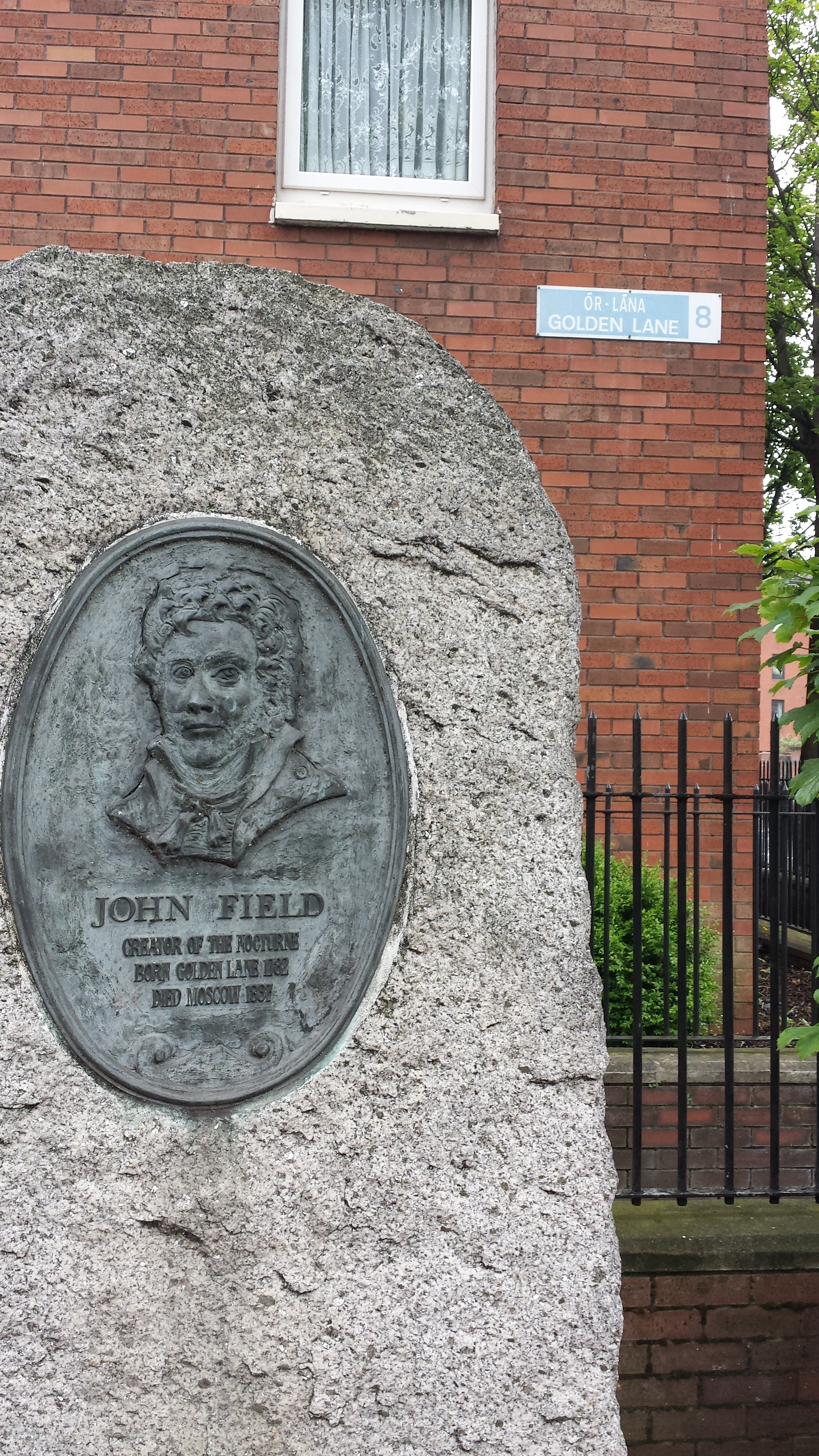
The John Field memorial plaque on Golden Lane

- John Field - composer and musician
- Lily Kempson
- Fielding Ould - medical practitioner
- Laetitia Pilkington

== See also ==
- Ship Street Little
- St. Bride's Church, Dublin
- Dublin Assay Office
