= Bull Alley Street =

Street in the Dublin, Ireland

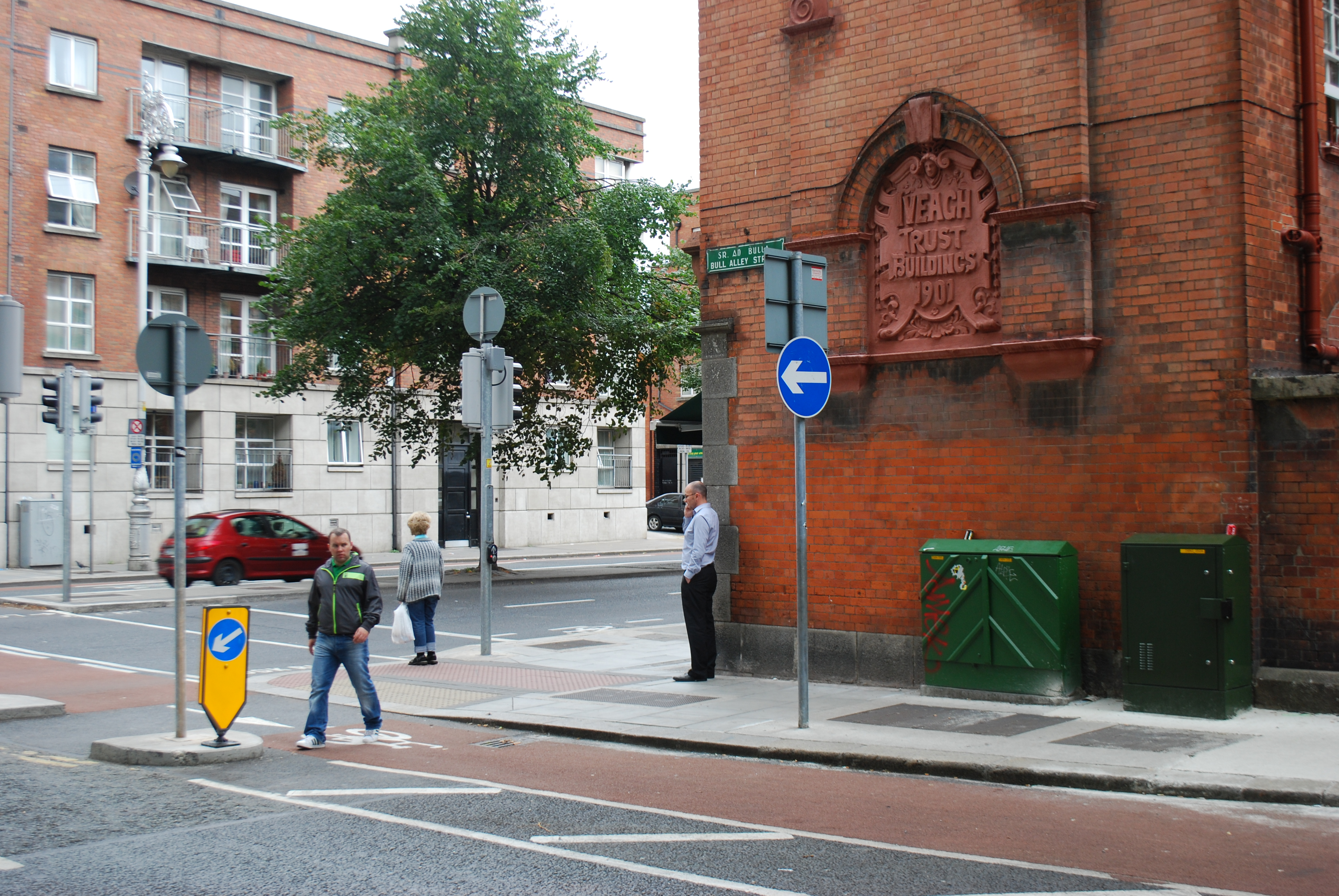
- Corner of Bull Alley Street and Patrick Street
- Native name: Sráid Scabhat na dTarbh (Irish)
- Former name: Bull Alley
- Location: Dublin, Ireland
- Postal code: D08
- east end: Bride Street
- west end: Patrick Street

Bull Alley Street (Irish: Sráid Scabhat na dTarbh) is a street in the medieval area of Dublin, Ireland.

== Location ==
Bull Alley Street runs from Bride Street to the east to Patrick Street to the west, and parallel with Bride Road. Along the southern side of the street is St Patrick's Park.

== History ==
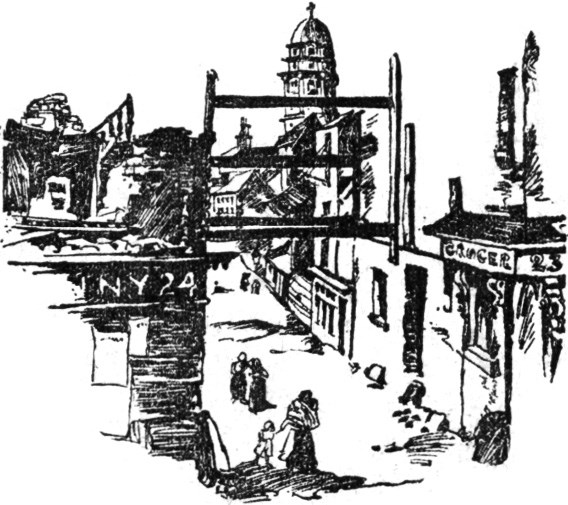
The entrance to Bull Alley slums circa 1899

This street first appears on maps of Dublin in 1680 as Bull Alley. It was part of the parish of St Nicholas Within. It is probable that the Street's name is derived from the name of a tavern or inn with a sign of a bull. In the late 1800s, the street had a large number of butchers, victuallers and other jobs associated with the meat industry.

Dublin Improvement (Bull Alley Area) Act 1899
- Act of Parliament
- Parliament of the United Kingdom
- Long title: An Act to authorise the improvement of the area bounded by Patrick Street Bride's Alley Bride Street and Bull Alley in the City of Dublin and the erection thereon of Workmen's Dwellings and other Buildings to vest the same and the control thereof in a body of Trustees to empower the Corporation of Dublin to carry out certain Street Widenings and for other purposes.
- Citation: 62 & 63 Vict. c. xi

Dates
- Royal assent: 6 June 1899

Other legislation
- Amended by: Iveagh Trust Act 1903

Text of statute as originally enacted

In the 1900s, using powers from the Dublin Improvement (Bull Alley Area) Act 1899 (62 & 63 Vict. c. xi), the Dublin Corporation built a housing scheme on Bull Alley Street, designed by C. J. McCarthy. It was completed in 1904, and complemented the Iveagh Trust scheme adjacent. The Iveagh Trust scheme consists of eight blocks of 213 apartments built between 1901 and 1905. Both schemes replaced slums which were razed for the construction. Most of these buildings are Art Nouveau in style. The Play Centre built by the trust in 1915, now Liberties College, was designed by L. A. McDonnell. The slums along the southern side of the street were cleared to make way for St Patrick's Park, as the slums had reached right up the side of St Patrick's Cathedral.
