= Church of St Michael le Pole =

Former 7th century Christian church in Dublin, Ireland

- Church of St Michael le Pole
- 53.3416°N 6.2683°W
- Location: Golden Lane, Dublin 8
- Country: Ireland
- Language: English
- Denomination: Church of Ireland
- Previous denomination: Roman Catholic 1191–1540)

History
- Founded: circa 700 AD

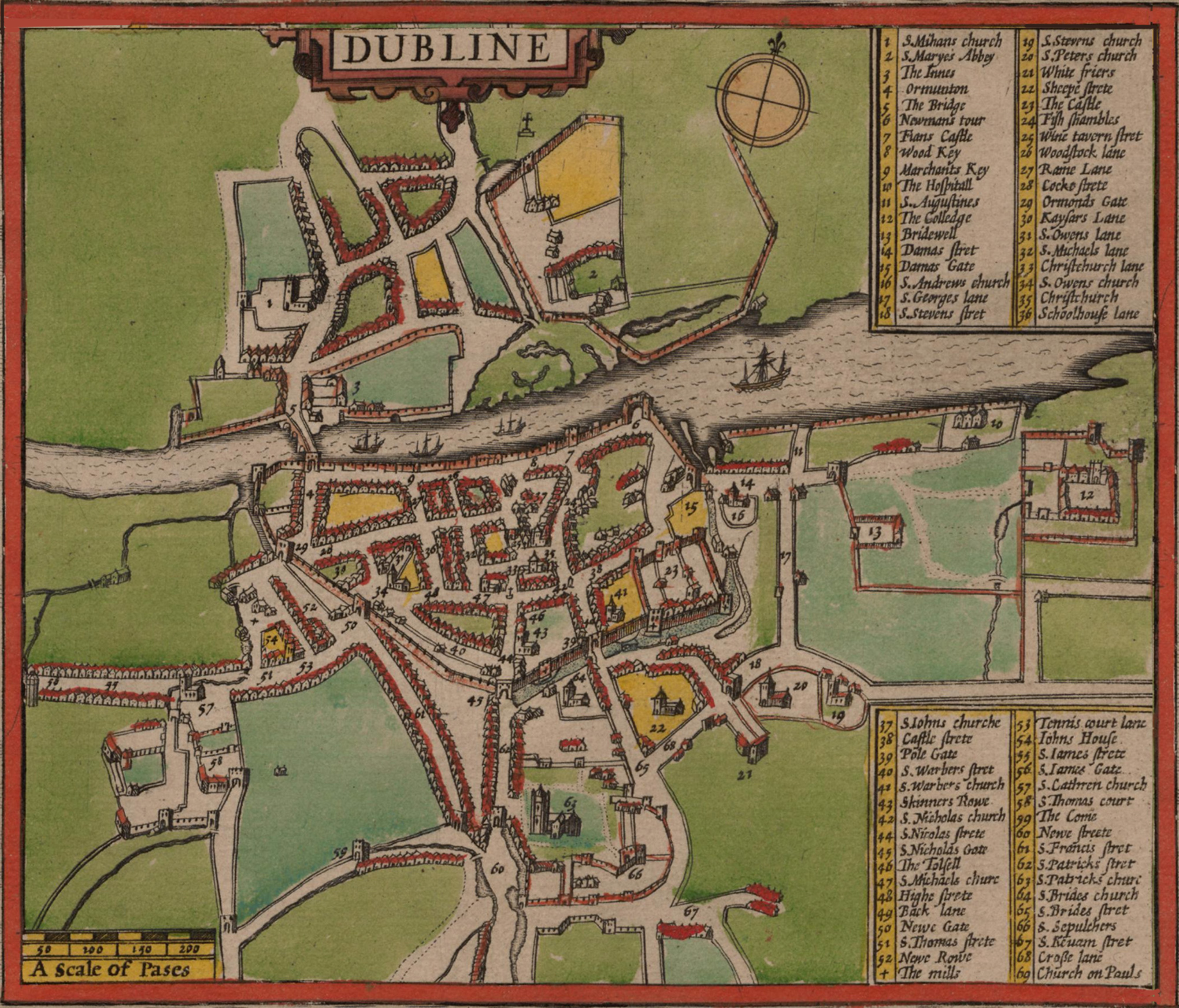
John Speed's Map of Dublin of 1610, with the church referenced as 69. 'Church on Pauls' (sic), an incorrect phonetic translation of Church on Pool.

The Church of St Michael le Pole (St Michael of the Pool) was an ancient pre-Norse church and ecclesiastic settlement in Dublin, Ireland which existed prior to the Norse invasion and creation of Early Scandinavian Dublin in the 9th century. It is believed the church may date from as far back as the 7th century.

The church was located between present day Ship Street Little, Ship Street Great, Golden Lane, Chancery Lane and Bride Street.

== History ==
=== Naming ===
The church is often referred to in historical accounts as St Michael de le Pole.

It is proposed by O'Donovan that the name 'Michael' is actually a Norman era phonetic corruption of the name MacThail, referring to Aengus son of Dergan who was one of three similarly named prelates of Kilcullen, County Kildare.

The name 'le pole' refers to the pool which was created by the River Poddle to the south and east of Dublin Castle and gives Dublin its name from being a corruption of the native Irish term "Dubh Linn" meaning black pool. Nearby Ship Street Little is also referred to as Poole Street on early maps as well as references the nearby and similarly named Pole gate. The church may be illustrated on John Speed's Map of Dublin (1610) noted beside Ship Street ('Sheepe Street').

=== Decline ===
The church was deconsecrated in 1682 when the parish of St Michael le Pole merged with that of St. Bride's and St Stephen with only the St Bride's name being retained and an entirely new church being built on Bride Street.

The church grounds of St Michael le Pole also featured a round tower which existed separately alongside the church and later as part of a 1707 school until 1775 when it was blown down in a storm and finally demolished owing to the danger posed by its collapse.

The tower features in illustrations attributed to the artist Gabriel Beranger in 1766 and later although at least one of these is itself likely a copy of a copy made by J Huban Smith from an unsigned original in the collection of William Betham (1779–1853) from 1751.
