= St. Werburgh's Church, Dublin =

Protestant church in Dublin, Ireland

Coordinates: 53°20′33″N 6°16′11″W

St Werburgh's Church, Dublin
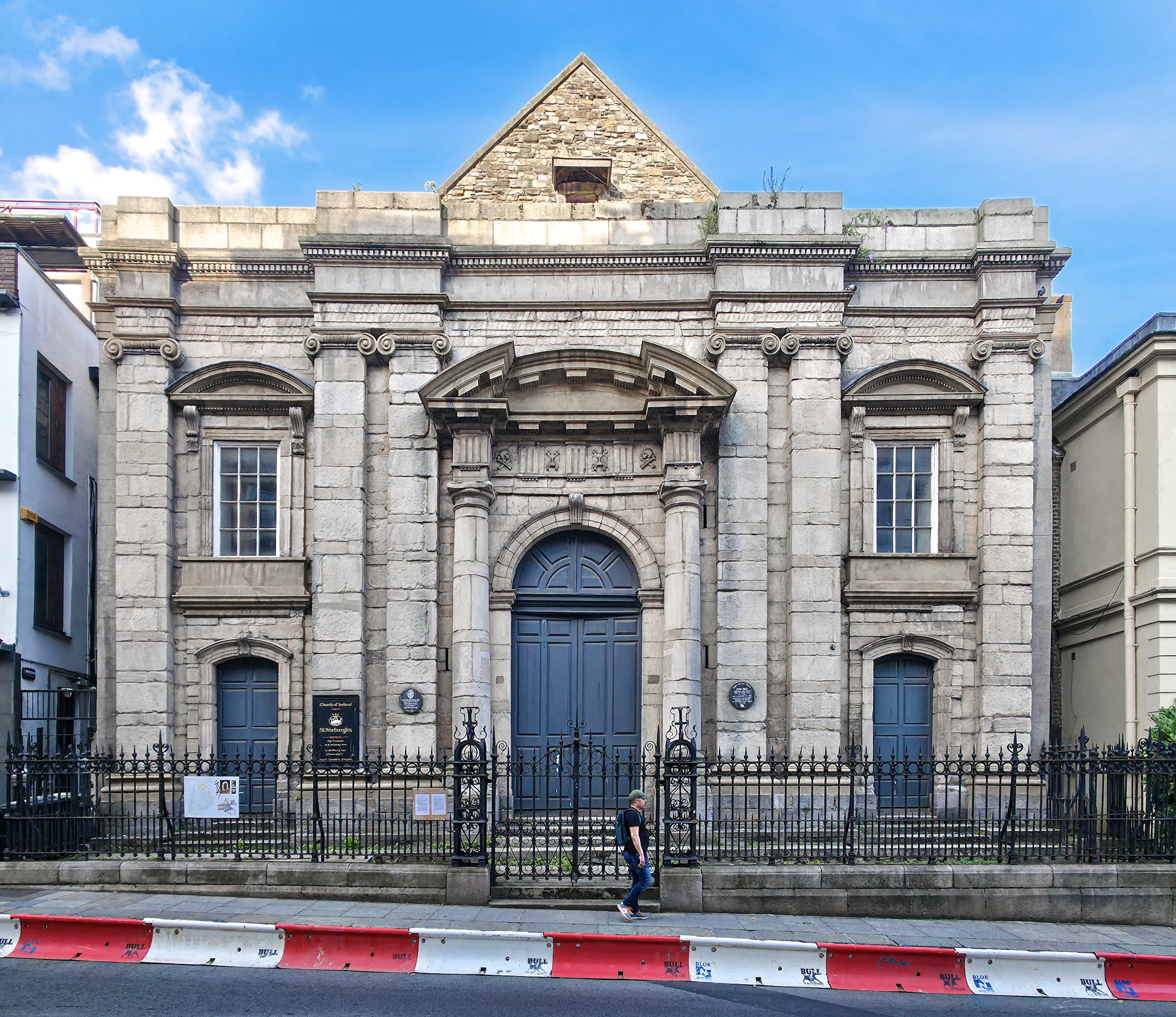

- Location: Werburgh Street, Dublin
- Country: Ireland
- Denomination: Church of Ireland
- Previous denomination: Roman Catholic

History
- Founded: 1178
- Founder: Men of Bristol
- Dedication: St. Werburgh

Architecture
- Architect(s): Thomas Burgh (1719), Joseph Jarratt (1759)
- Architectural type: Italianate classicism

Specifications
- Length: (interior) 80 feet (24.4 m)
- Width: (interior) 52 feet (15.8 m)

Administration
- Province: Province of Dublin
- Diocese: Diocese of Dublin and Glendalough

St. Werburgh's Church is a Church of Ireland church building in Dublin, Ireland. The original church on this site was built in 1178, shortly after the arrival of the Anglo-Normans in the town. It was named after St. Werburgh, abbess of Ely and patron saint of Chester. The current building was constructed in 1719. It is located in Werburgh Street, close to Dublin Castle.

== The church ==
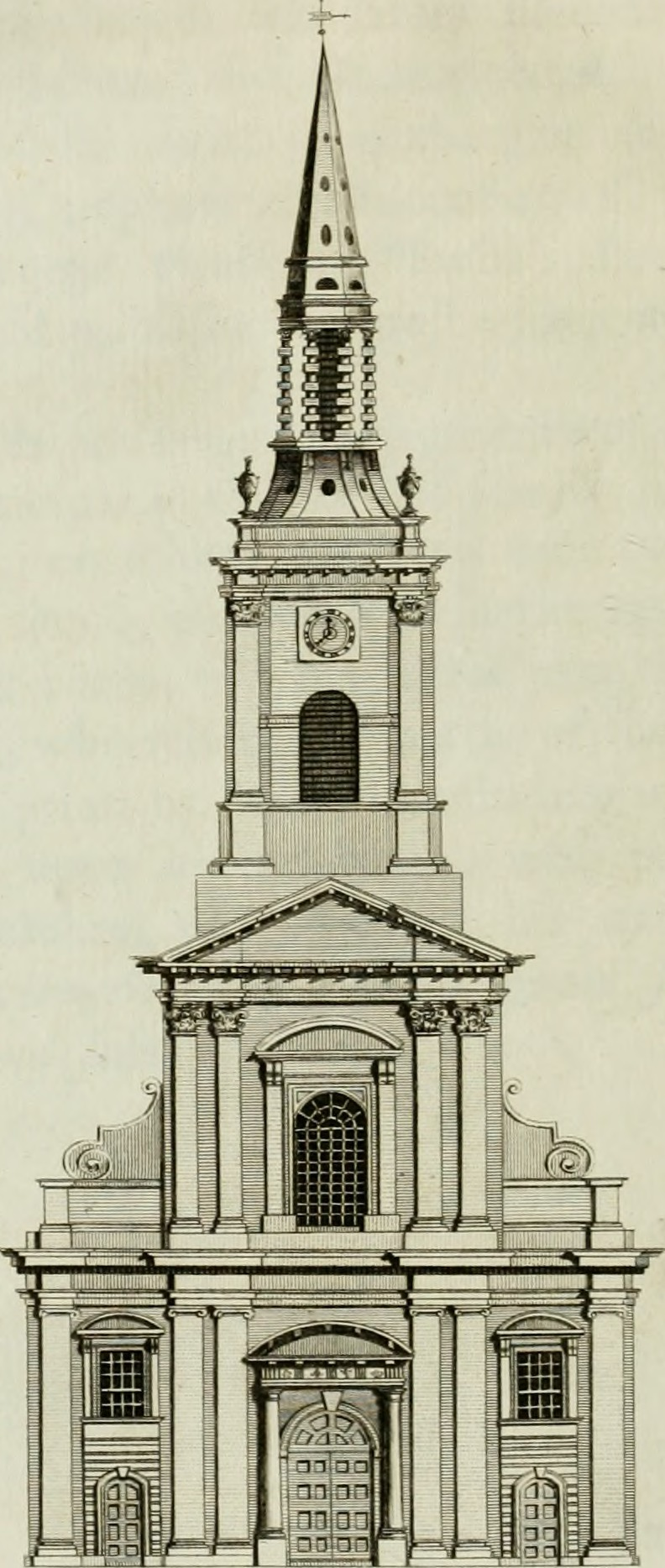
St. Werburgh's Church illustration from 1780

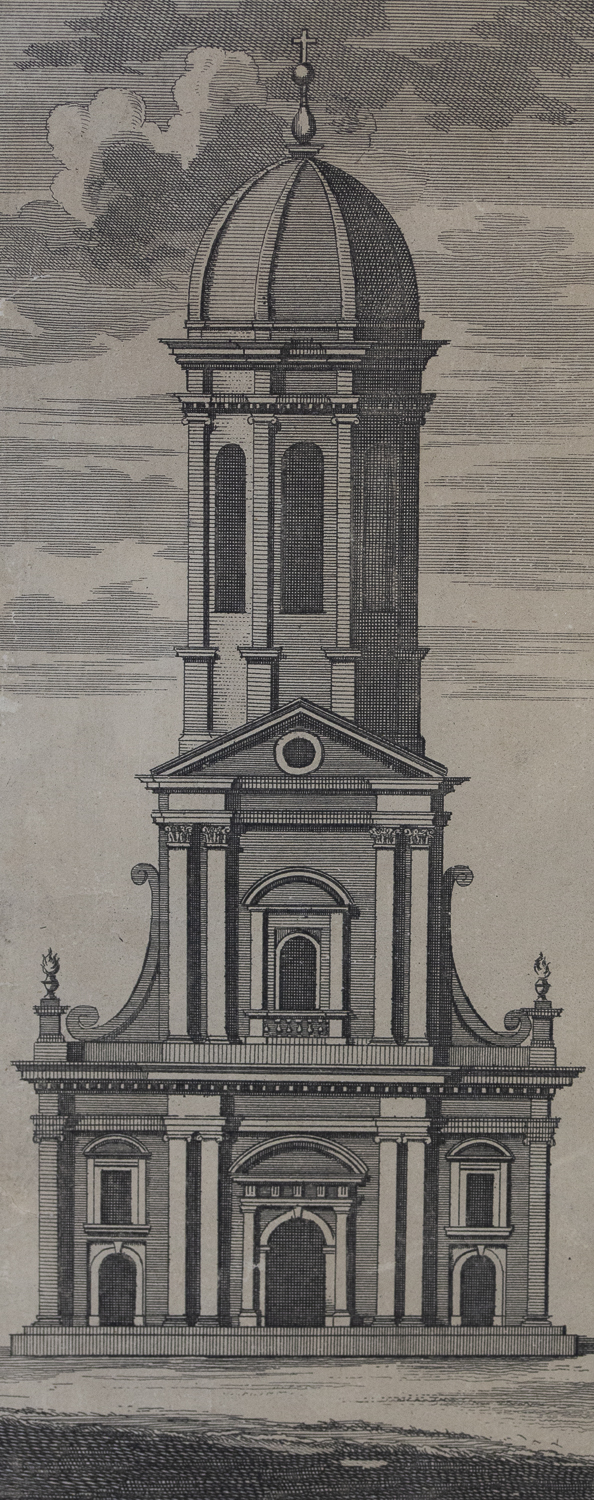
An illustration of the church including a never constructed dome, taken from Charles Brooking's map of Dublin (1728).

In Celtic and Danish times, the parish was dedicated to St. Martin of Tours; the church stood near the south end of Werburgh Street. After St. Werburgh's Church was constructed it was much frequented by Bristol men, who were amongst the earliest settlers in Dublin. It contained chapels in honour of Our Lady, St. Martin and St. Catherine.

The original church was burned down in 1311 (along with much of the city) and was rebuilt. From the time of Archbishop Henry de Loundres (died 1228), St. Werburgh's was appropriated to the Chancellor of St. Patrick's. By 1559 the nearby church of St. Mary del Dam on Dame Street was closed and its parish incorporated into that of St. Werburgh's. Dublin Castle fell within the bounds of the merged parishes.

The Church of Ireland Primate – James Ussher was appointed to this church in 1607, and Edward Wetenhall, afterwards Bishop of Kilmore, author of the well-known Greek and Latin Grammars, was curate here. Swift's friend, Dr. Patrick Delany (1685–1768), was rector of the parish in 1730.

During the 17th century conflicts erupted between the parish of St. Werburgh and that of nearby St. John the Evangelist (located in Fishamble Street) over parish boundaries. Each vestry wanted houses to levy rates on. The contested houses were in Copper Alley and those around Essex Gate and Essex Bridge.

St. Werburgh's Church Act 1715
- Act of Parliament
- Parliament of Ireland
- Long title: An Act for changing the site and new building of the parish-church of St. Werburg's in the city of Dublin.
- Citation: 2 Geo. 1. c. 24 (I)

Dates
- Royal assent: 20 June 1716
- Commencement: 20 June 1716
- Repealed: 13 August 1878

Other legislation
- Repealed by: Statute Law Revision (Ireland) Act 1878

Status: Repealed

The church needed replacement by the end of the seventeenth century. An act of 1715 (2 Geo. 1. c. 24 (I)) which passed through the Irish Parliament appointed commissioners for building a new church. Colonel Thomas Burgh, M.P. for Naas, Surveyor-General for Public Buildings, was entrusted with the erection of the new structure. This was completed, so far as to admit the celebration of divine service, in 1719, at a cost of £8,000. However, it was seriously damaged by fire in November 1754 and did not re-open until 1759. The present interior dates from this time, and was designed by John Smyth.

Perhaps it is because of this that the area's fire engines used to be stored in the church porch; the church today holds the oldest surviving fire appliances in the city.

In the eighteenth century, St. Werburgh's came into vogue as the parish church of the British Lord Lieutenant and his entourage, where he had his own Viceregal pew inserted in 1767. In fact the pew register for this church lists many of the persons prominent in Dublin public life in this century. Around the same time, John Smith (or Smyth) was the architect of an upper gallery for schoolchildren. The tower and spire were added the following year. The spire was removed around 1810 by the Castle authorities as a security measure, as it overlooked the Castle yard. They used as an excuse that the tower was unsafe (whereupon the architect Francis Johnston offered to make it safe, but was rejected); the tower was felled twenty-six years later.

The interior of the church was re-modelled in 1877 by the architect William Welland, when the parish was united with that of St. John the Evangelist.

== Civil parish ==
The parish corresponds with the civil parish of the same name.

== The organ ==
In the year 1754, an accidental fire was started within the church which left nothing except the stonework and bells. Sir Philip Hoey, a clergyman attached at one time to St Werburgh's church, left a sum of money to purchase an organ. It was built by Millars of College Street and was first publicly performed in June 1768.

On 3 May 1787, a commemoration of Handel was performed in St. Werburgh's Church by amateurs of the highest distinction, including Sir Hercules Langrishe, Baron Dillon, Surgeon Neale, Lady Portarlington and Mrs. Stopford.

The present organ was first built by the local eighteenth-century organ builder Ferdinand Weber and restored by Telford and Telford around 1870 within the case of the organ originally installed.

The instrument comprises two manuals and pedals, with mechanical action throughout, and a total of fifteen stops, with one further stop prepared for but never inserted. The gilded front pipes and a number of the internal pipes are of eighteenth-century origin. The manual keyboards of the normal compass, and 56 notes, but the pedals are of a transitional mid-nineteenth-century design featuring only 25 notes.

The organ still contains a space for individuals to pump the bellows of the organ, a practice which was necessary before the widespread electrification of the instrument in the 1960s. This space contains a number of historical pieces of graffiti. George Frideric Handel used this instrument for the rehearsal of his work Messiah which premiered in the Great Music Hall, Fishamble Street.

== Clergy and notable parishioners ==
John Field, composer and pianist was baptized in this church on 5 September 1782. His grandfather, also John Field, a professional organist, played the organ in this church.

Rev. J.H. Mason Chancellor of St. Patrick's was rector of St. Werburgh's.

There is a collection of parish deeds from the parish of St. Werburgh dating from 1317 to 1662, listing property owners in the parish. They were catalogued by the Royal Irish Academy between 1916 and 1919.

== Burials ==
There was a churchyard next to the church used for hundreds of years and beneath the church are twenty-seven vaults.

Nicholas Sutton, the Attorney General for Ireland, was buried here in 1478; his family had lived on Werburgh Street for several generations.

William Hilton, High Court judge and Member of Parliament, and his wife Anne Ussher, were buried here within a short time of each other in 1651.

Peter Palmer, second justice of the Court of Common Pleas (Ireland), was buried here in 1621.

Robert Sibthorp, Bishop of Limerick was buried here in 1649.

Sir James Ware (1594–1666), historian, was buried here in December 1666.

Lord Edward Fitzgerald, commander-in-chief of the United Irishmen was buried in the vaults of this church on 5 June 1798, while his captor, Major Sirr, was buried in the churchyard in 1841.

== Gallery ==
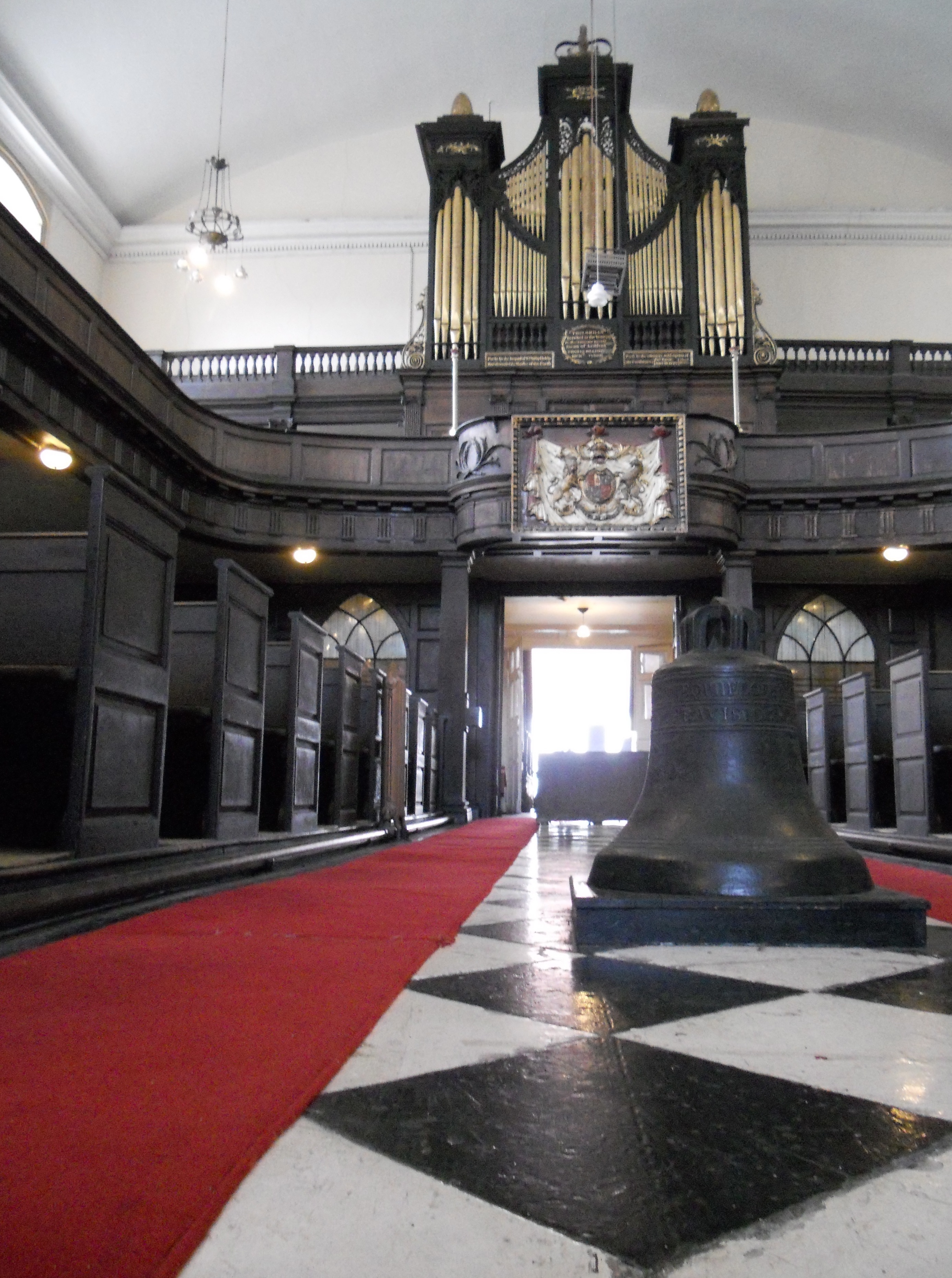
St Werburgh's interior

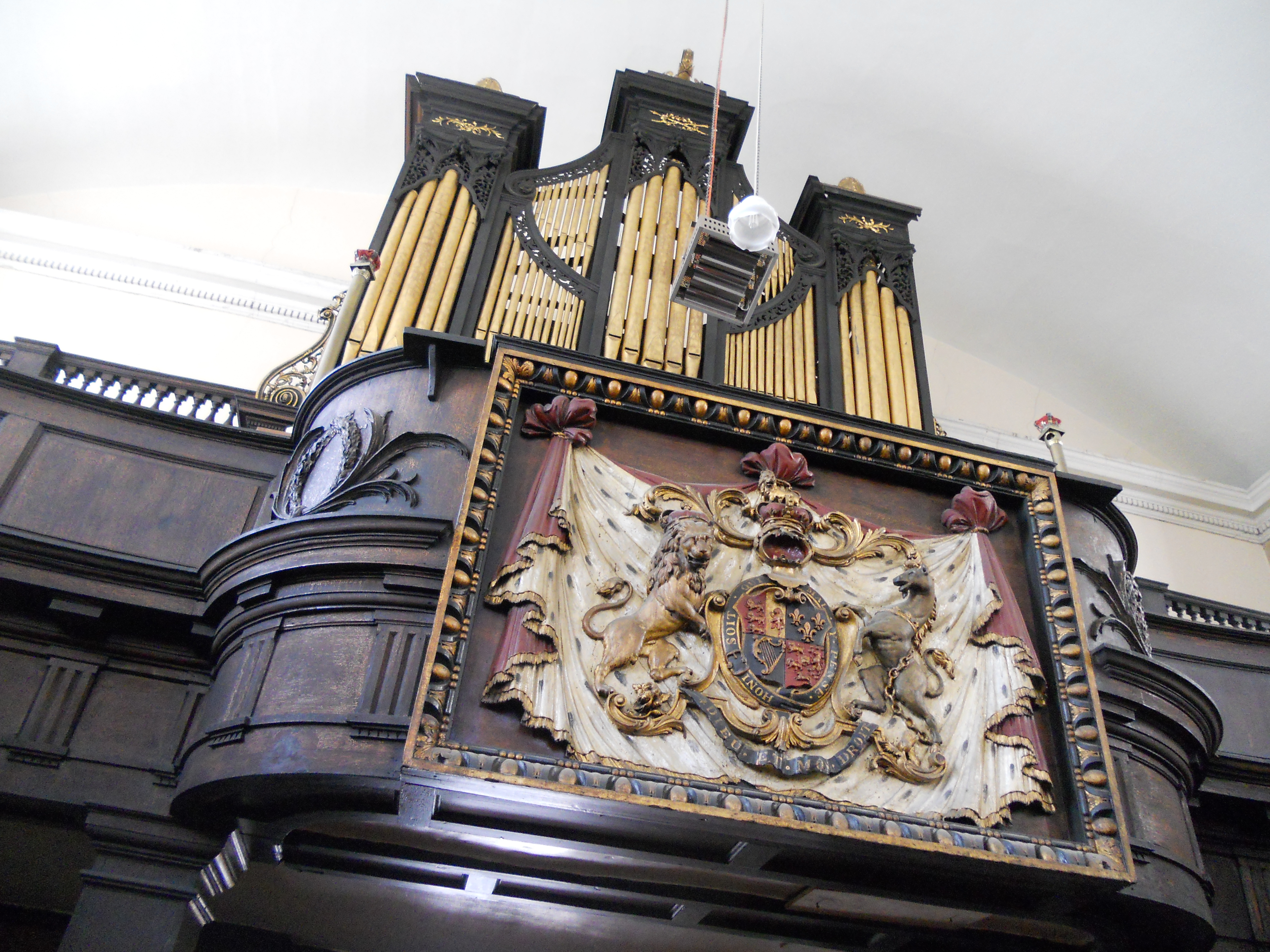
Church organ and Lord Lieutenants' gilded pew (c1767)

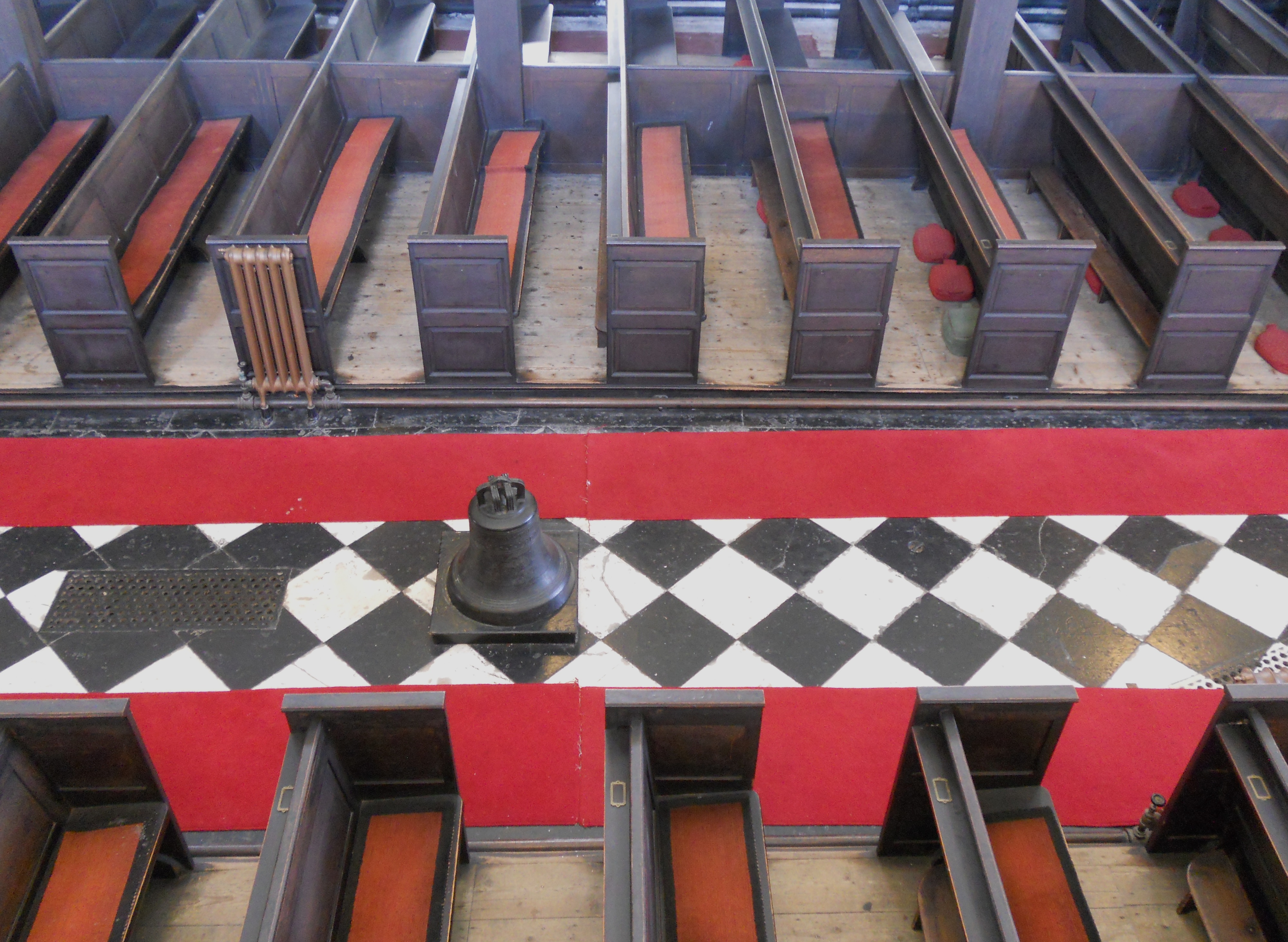
Parish pews (c1760)

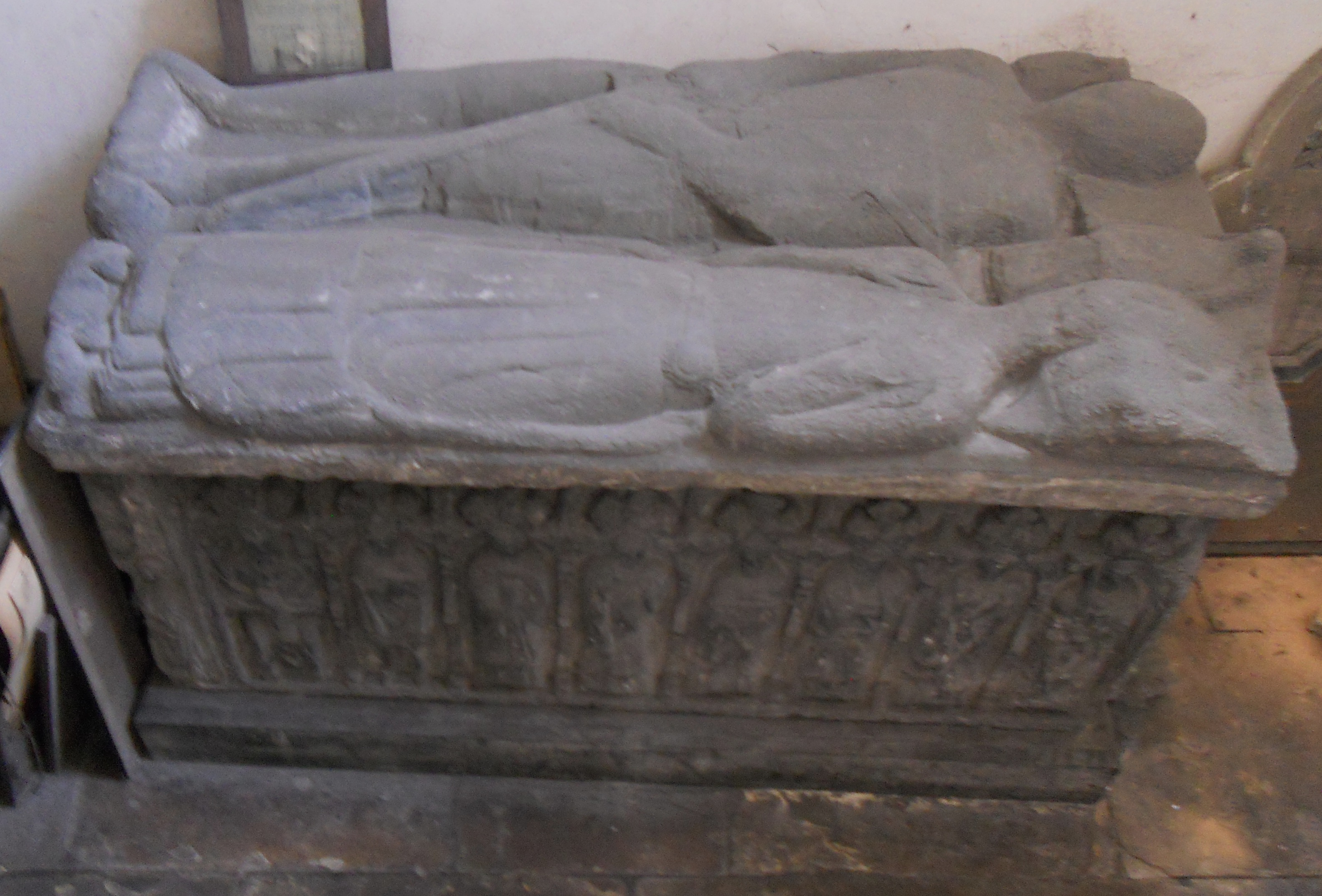
Fitzgerald's medieval tomb (c1510), stored at St Werburgh's.

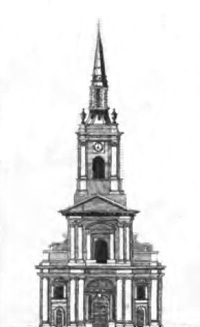
St. Werburgh's in 1808, showing the tower and steeple

== References and sources ==
Notes

Sources

- Gilbert, John (1854). A History of the City of Dublin. Oxford: Oxford University.
- George Newenham Wright (2005). "An Historical Guide to the City of Dublin". Online book. Archived from the original on 31 October 2007.
- Craig, Maurice (1969). Dublin: 1660–1860. Dublin: Allen Figgis.
- Berry, Henry F. (1915). Journal of the Royal Society of Antiquaries of Ireland. Dublin: Royal Society of Antiquaries of Ireland.
- Ryan, James G. (2001). Irish Church Records. Flyleaf Press. ISBN 0-9539974-0-5.
