= Ship Street =

Ship Street may refer to:

- Ship Street, Hong Kong
- Ship Street Little, Dublin, Ireland
- Ship Street, Oxford, England
