= Fielding Ould =

Irish physician (1710–1789)

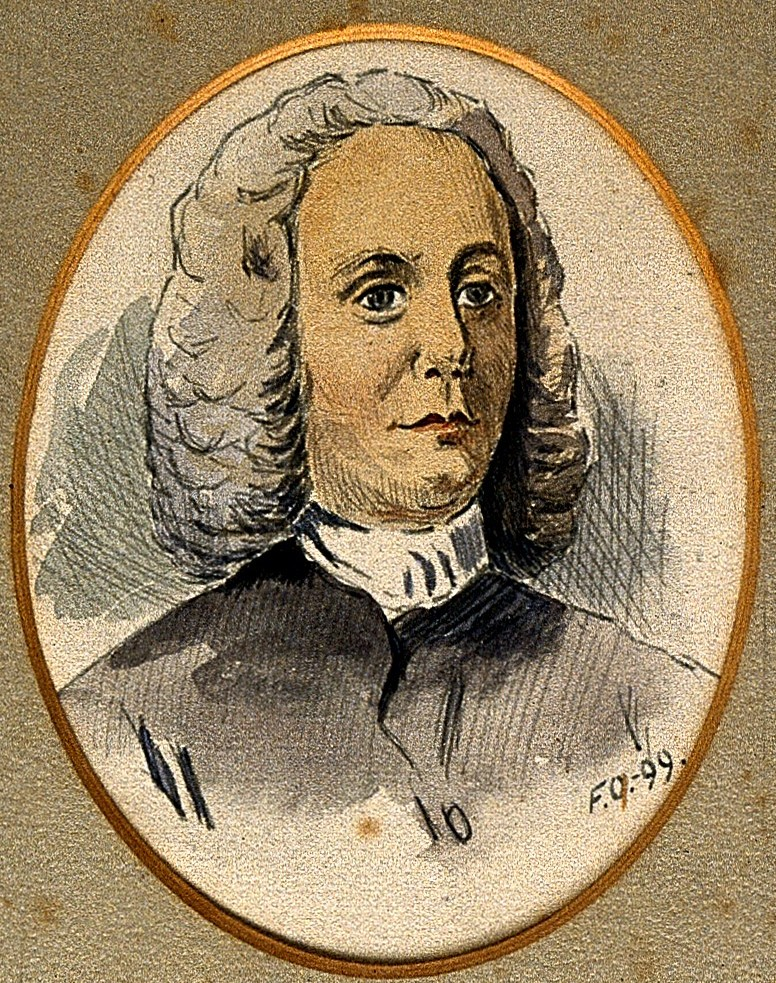

Fielding Ould (1710 – 29 November 1789) was an Irish physician.

== Biography ==
Ould was born in 1710, the son of British Army Captain Abraham Ould (1689–1715) and a Miss Shawe of Galway, in which city he was born. He studied in Paris and settled in Golden Lane, Dublin as a medical doctor in 1736. He published an enormously influential treatise on midwifery in 1742, although it was criticized for a number of factual errors.

An obstetrician, Ould acquired a huge practice and was master of the Rotunda Hospital (the Dublin lying-in hospital). After a lengthy battle, he was eventually granted his licence as a physician. In 1759, he was knighted for services to the medical profession.

Ould was one of 49 physicians and chirurgeons who declared their public support for the construction of a Publick Bath in Dublin in May 1771 and named Achmet Borumborad as a well qualified individual for carrying such a scheme into existence.

Ould was appointed Sheriff of Dublin City in 1775.

Ould had at least two children, including William, who was chaplain of the Rotunda Hospital. Later descendants included the painter Sir Fielding Fielding-Ould, and the noted architect William Vitruvius Morrison. He died of apoplexy at his home on South Frederick Street and was buried at St. Ann's Churchyard, Dawson Street.

== Bibliography ==
- A Treatise of Midwifry, in three parts, Dublin, 1742
