= Werburgh Street =

Street in South Dublin city

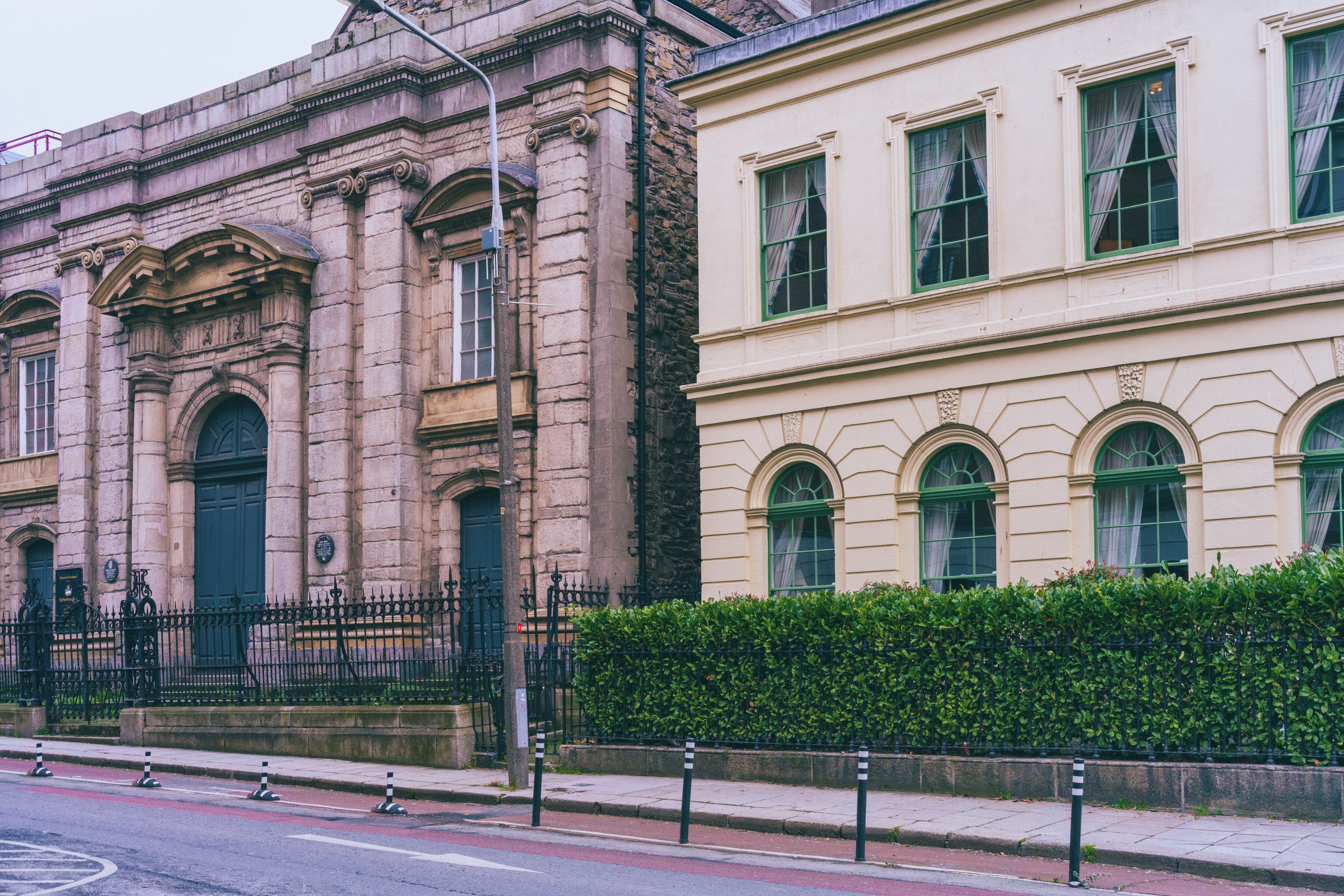
- L-R: The Italianate Saint Werburgh's Church with the Georgian-era Deanery of Christchurch Cathedral in Dublin D08
- Interactive map of Werburgh Street
- Native name: Sráid San Werburgh (Irish)
- Namesake: St. Werburgh's Church
- Location: Dublin, Ireland
- Postal code: D08
- Coordinates: 53.3425793°N 6.2720443°W
- north end: Castle Street
- Major junctions: Ship Street Little
- south end: Bride Street

Other
- Known for: Medieval history Werburgh Street Theatre; Dublin city wall and gates

Werburgh Street (Irish: Sráid San Werburgh) is a street in the medieval area of Dublin, Ireland, named for St. Werburgh's Church.

== Location ==
Werburgh Street runs from Castle Street at the northern end, to Bride Street at the south, parallel with Patrick Street.

== History ==
The street was originally St Werburgh Street, named after St. Werburgh's Church, with the street first appearing on maps in 1257. Werburgh Street Theatre was the first purpose-built theatre built in Ireland.

In 1280 Sir Robert Bagod bought a stone dwelling house near Werburgh Street from the Hyntenberghs, a prominent Dublin family. In the fifteenth century, Roger Sutton had a house on the Street. It passed on his death to his son William Sutton, Attorney-General for Ireland.

The southern end of the street was the location of one of the gateways in the city's walls, known as St Werburgh's Gate or Pole Gate. In the 1600s, the southern end was also the location of the Main Guard of the city. Their station on the street is denoted by Gun Alley nearby, which has since been demolished.

The earliest iteration of the prison, the Four Courts Marshalsea, was also located on Werburgh Street in an area previously known as Shoemaker's Street from 1580 until the 18th century.

In 1637, perhaps as early as 1634. John Ogilby (at the time, Master of the Revels for Ireland and member of the household of Thomas Wentworth, 1st Earl of Strafford, the Lord Deputy of Ireland) founded Ireland's first theatre, the Werburgh Street Theatre.

There was a square on the western side of the street known as Darby Square, where the Liberty Rangers performed military practice in the run-up to the 1798 rebellion.

In 1785, a portion of the pavement collapsed, revealing a cave 40 feet deep filled with coffins and bones. It was thought to be the remains of the old cemetery of St Martin's Church.

Jonathan Swift was born in Hoey's Court, which was off Werburgh Street. One of the last surviving cagework, timber and plaster houses in Dublin was on the corner of Werburgh and Castle Street before it was demolished in 1913.

== See also ==
- Leo Burdock
- List of streets and squares in Dublin
