= Iveagh Trust =

Housing association in the Dublin area

Coordinates: 53.34139°N 6.271153°W

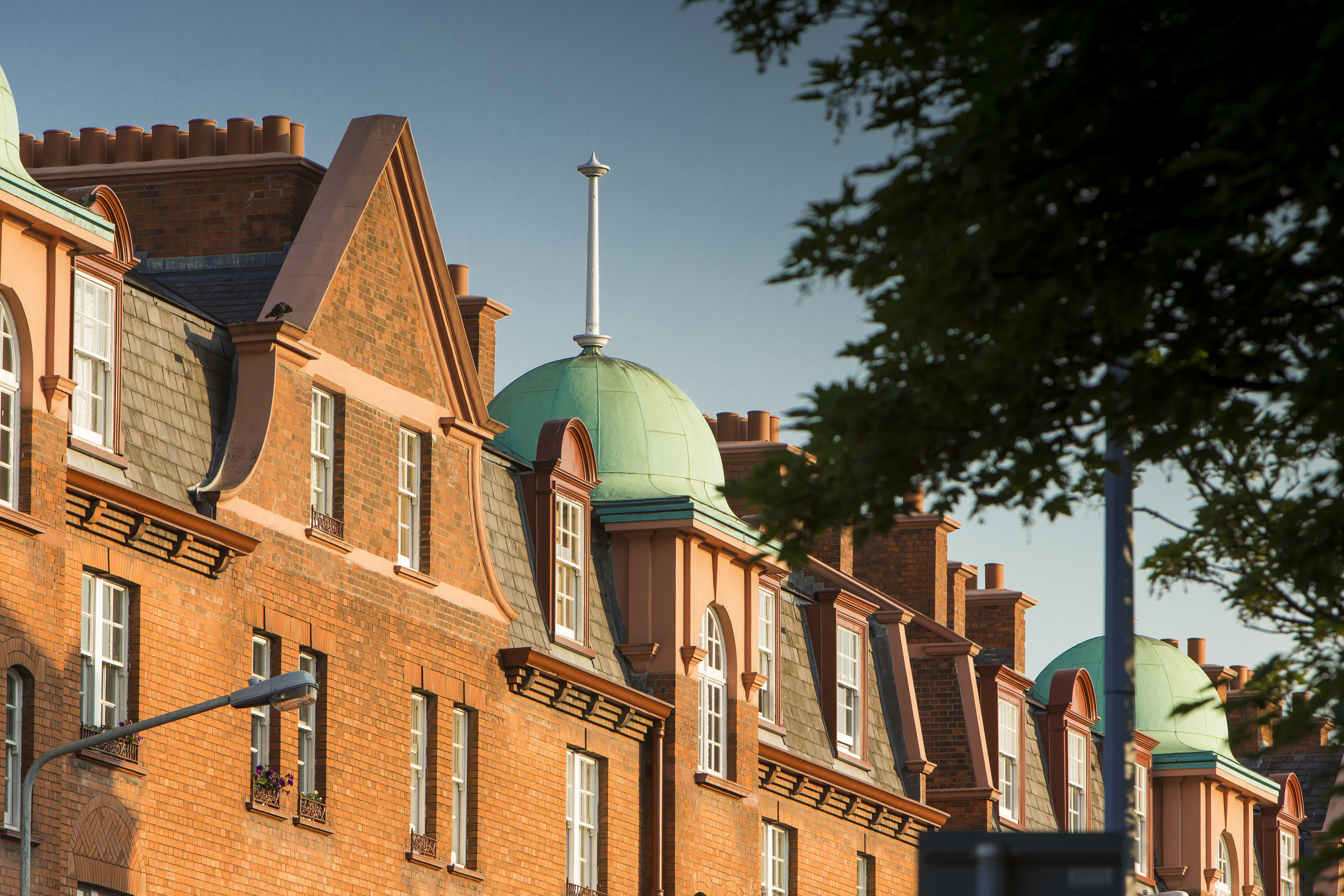
The Edwardian buildings of The Iveagh Trust, Bull Alley Street.

The Iveagh Trust /ˈaɪviː/ is a provider of affordable housing in and around Dublin in Ireland. It was initially a component of the Guinness Trust, founded in 1890 by the then Edward Cecil Guinness, great-grandson of the founder of the Guinness Brewery, to help homeless people in Dublin and London. Edward Cecil Guinness was created the 1st Baron Iveagh in 1891, the 1st Viscount Iveagh in 1905, and the 1st Earl of Iveagh in 1919. The Iveagh Trust is not otherwise related to the brewery company.

== Guinness Partnership ==
Iveagh Trust Act 1903
- Act of Parliament
- Parliament of the United Kingdom
- Long title: An Act to amalgamate the Guinness Trust (Dublin) Fund with the Dublin Improvement (Bull Alley Area) Scheme to vest the property of the Guinness (Dublin) Trustees in the Trustees of the said scheme to change the name of such last-mentioned Trustees to confer further powers on them and for other purposes.
- Citation: 3 Edw. 7. c. iii
- Territorial extent: Ireland

Dates
- Royal assent: 30 June 1903

Other legislation
- Amends: Dublin Improvement (Bull Alley Area) Act 1899

Status: Current legislation

Text of statute as originally enacted

The Guinness Trust extended its objectives outside London in 1962 and today operates in all parts of England as a member of the Guinness Partnership, a group of housing associations. However, the Iveagh Trust became a separate organisation in 1903 with responsibility for activities in Ireland. It was given a statutory legal basis by the Iveagh Trust Act 1903 (3 Edw. 7. c. iii), also known as the Dublin Improvement (Bull Alley Area) Act 1903. Today it is run as a charity under Irish law and liaises with such bodies as Dublin City Council and the Homeless Agency.

== Current ==
In today's central Dublin several original buildings in the area of St Patrick's Cathedral, Patrick Street and Christ Church Cathedral are still managed. Following a report by John Lumsden, they were built between 1896 and 1945 by the Iveagh Trust, including formerly the Iveagh Public Baths and the Iveagh Market building on Francis Street. Lord Iveagh also made donations to St Patrick's Cathedral and created the St Patrick's Park gardens in 1901 between the cathedral and the Iveagh Trust buildings. Today's buildings were therefore only a part of a larger urban renewal plan, at a time when Dublin was infamous for its poverty and its unsanitary tenements.

In more recent times new properties have been acquired in Hallwell in Adamstown, Clay Farm in Leopardstown, Cork Street Dublin 8, Swords and Clongriffin, and a home for the elderly at Mount Anthony in south Dublin. With new properties being built in Dolphins Barn due to begin soon. Unlike Dublin City Council's housing list based on need, the trust has aimed to create mixed communities with smaller numbers. Each estate has a resident caretaker and a formal system of elected tenants' councils to advise of complaints or problems. The CEO of The Iveagh Trust is Aidan Culhane.

The Trust also runs the Iveagh Hostel in central Dublin for homeless men, providing basic accommodation, meals and such facilities as a gym and an internet access room. The original 508 cubicles have been converted to 195 bedrooms. Former residents include Liam O'Flaherty after leaving the army in 1917, and Patrick Kavanagh.

A former trust building for children to play in, known as "The Bayno", was closed in 1975, and now houses the Liberties College.

== The Museum Flat ==
Flat 3B on the Bull Alley Estate is the only flat in The Iveagh Trust stock which has remained largely unchanged since the first tenants took up occupancy in 1904. Following the death of the last tenant, Nellie Molloy, in 2002, Trustees decided that the flat should remain a museum – a visual reminder of flat design and of how families lived in the early days of The Iveagh Trust. Miranda, Lady Iveagh, donated the funds to purchase the content of the flat from Nellie's family to enable this to happen. The Museum Flat is available for viewing by appointment.
