= Liberties College =

College in Ireland

Coordinates: 53.3408°N 6.2712°W

- Colasiste Na Saoirsi
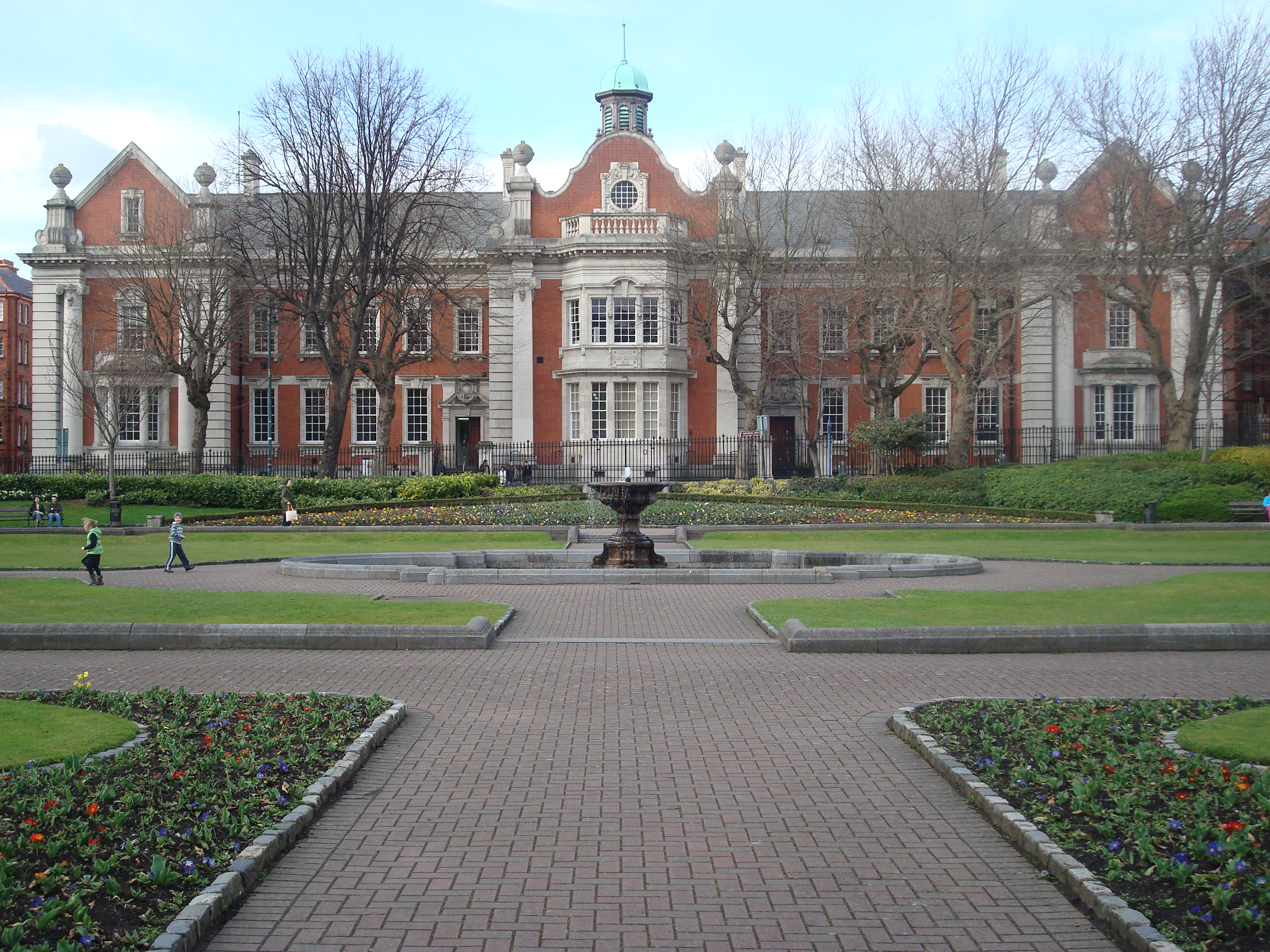
- Affiliations: City of Dublin Education and Training Board
- Principal: Siobhán O’Carroll
- Students: 700(Full Time); 200(Part Time)
- Location: Bull Alley Street, Dublin 8, D08 A8N0
- Website: http://www.libertiescollege.ie

Liberties College is an educational institution in Bull Alley Street, Dublin, Ireland. It offers further education courses, including Post Leaving Certificate courses.

The college is housed in an Edwardian building, described in the National Inventory of Architectural Heritage record as displaying elements of the "free Queen Anne idiom" and the "Flemish Renaissance" style.

The courses offered include Counselling, Health Care, Montessori Education, Social Studies, Tourism, and Information Technology.

At Liberties College many students avail of Back to Education and Training Support, via the BEA and VTOS schemes.

Liberties College is under supervision of the CDETB/City of Dublin Education and Training Board umbrella body.

== See also ==
- Education in the Republic of Ireland
- List of further education colleges in the Republic of Ireland
