= List of gates of Dublin =

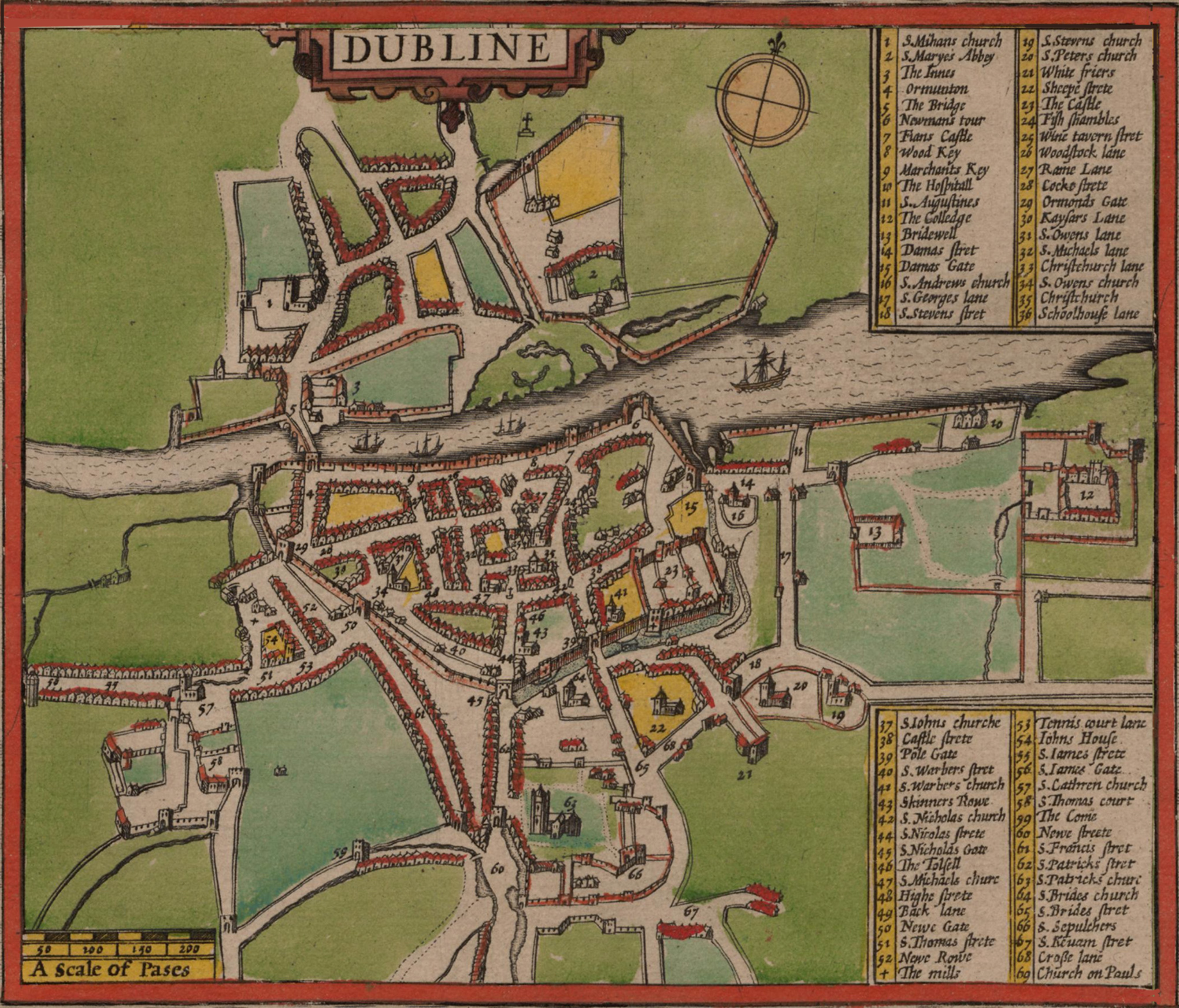
The city walls as shown in John Speed's map of Dublin in 1610.

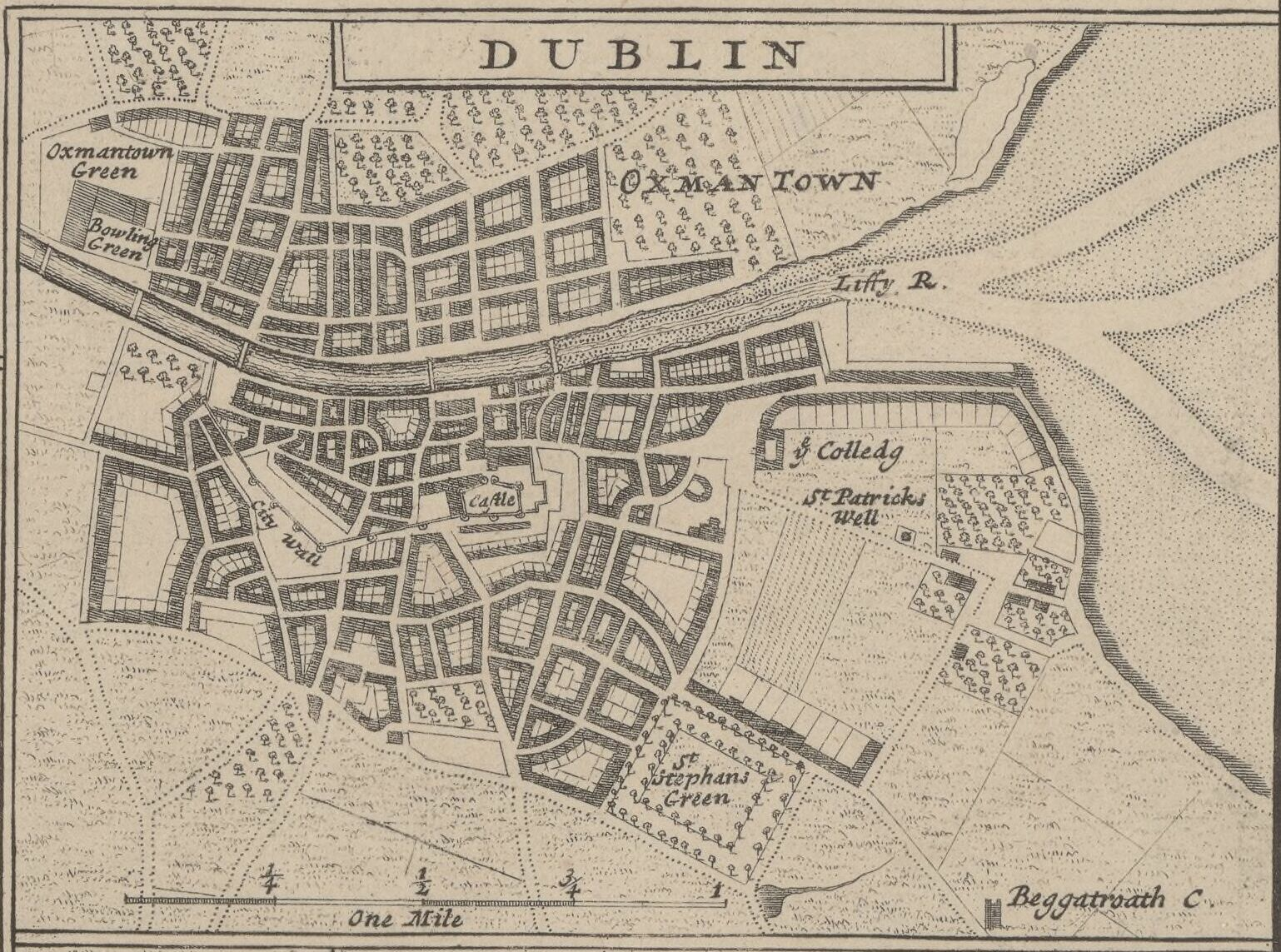
The path of the city walls c. 1714

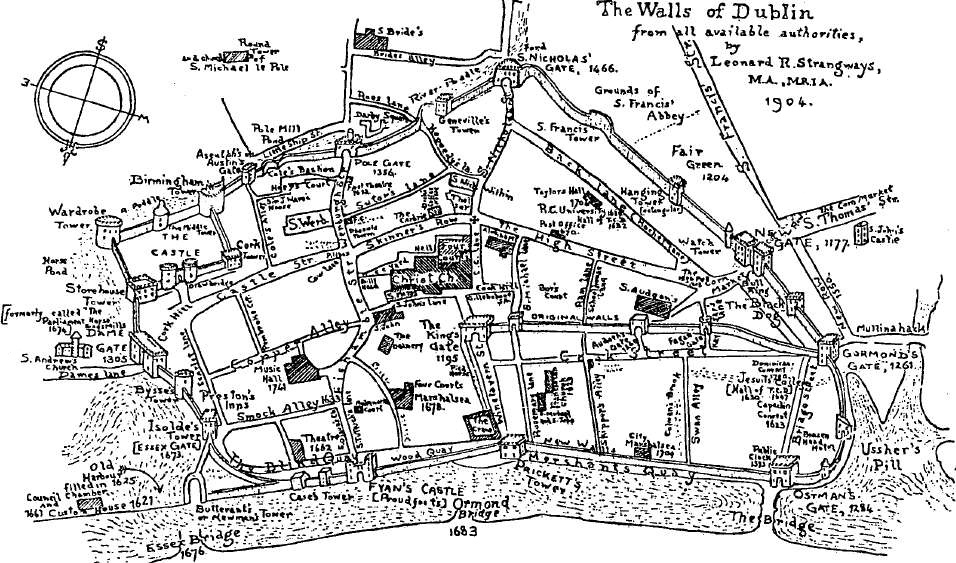
Map of the Dublin City Walls by Leonard R. Strangways, 1904

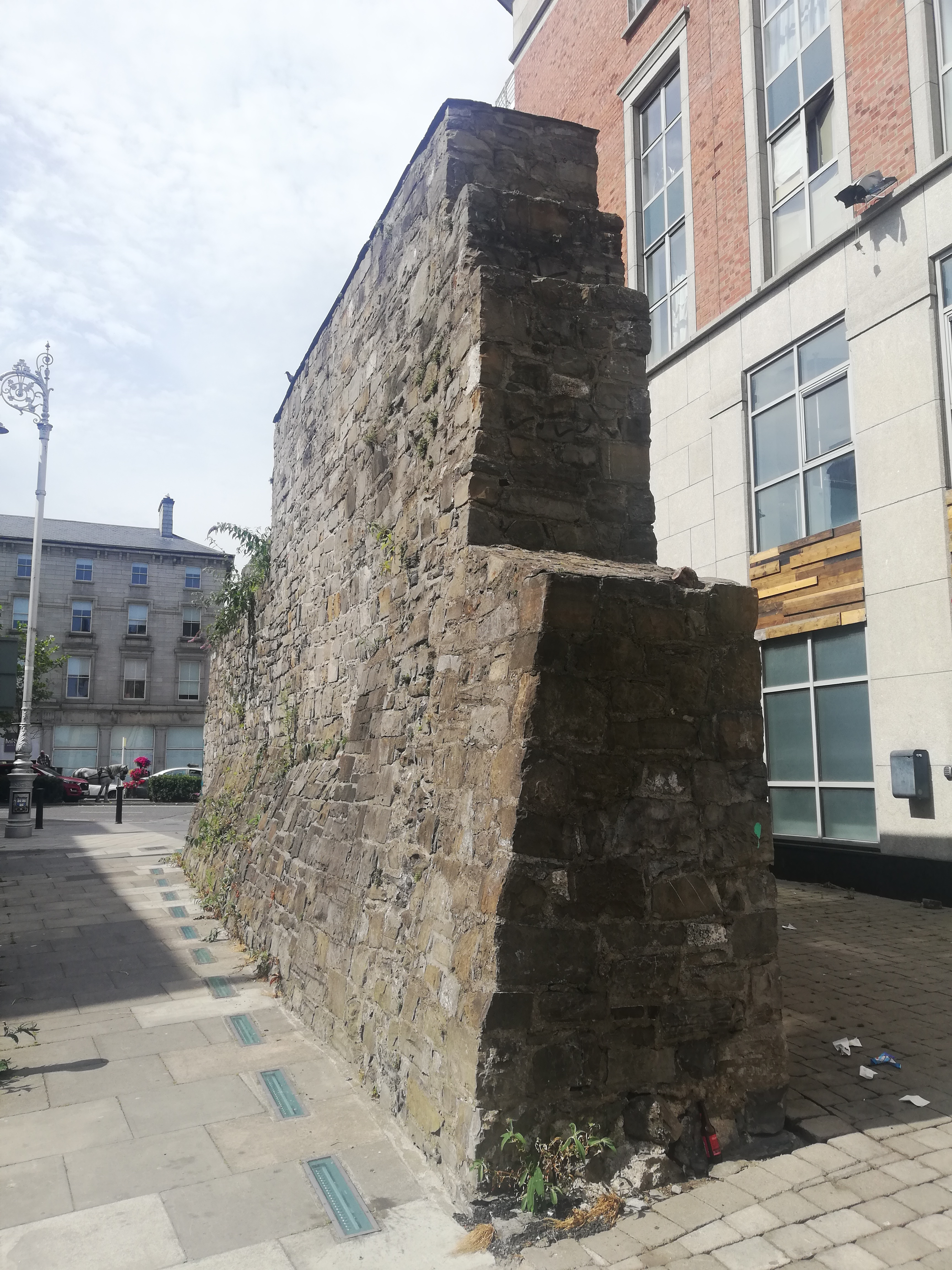
Surviving piece of Dublin city walls near Cornmarket

The walls and fortifications around Dublin were raised by the Ostmen in the 9th century, and the majority of the cities in Ireland remained subject to incursions by native clans until the 17th century. The defences of Dublin would eventually fall into disrepair but continued to serve a purpose as late as 1762 when the auction of the rights to collect tolls at each of the then seven city gates raised £4,000 for the city.

Below is a list of the historic Gates of Dublin along the city's ancient boundaries:

Name	Alternative name	Date	Location	Image
St Werburgh's Gate	St Martin's-gate, Le Pole Gate, Pole-gate	1250	between Werburgh Street and Bride Street	
St Nicholas Gate		1466	between St Nicholas Street and St Patrick Street	
New Gate		1177	Cornmarket	
Wormwood Gate	Gormund-gate, Ormond-gate, Earl's Gate	1261	Between St Augustine Street and Lower Bridge Street	
Bridge-gate	Ostman's-gate	1284	at the Old Bridge over the River Liffey	
Dame's-gate	Eastern-gate	1305	Dame Street	
Essex-gate		1678	on the site of Isolde's Tower	
St. Audoen's Gate	Water-gate	1240	behind St. Audoen's Church on Cook Street	
Winetavern Gate	King's-gate	1195	Winetavern Street	
St Austin's-gate			Crow Street	
Gillamocholmog's-gate		1175	across from St Michael's Lane	
St Patrick's-gate		1250	near St Patrick's Cathedral	
St Kevin's Gate		1326	Wexford Street	
Coombe-gate		1488	The Coombe	
St James' Gate		1555	Meeting of Thomas Street, James's Street and Watling Street	
St Thomas's-gate		1577	The Coombe	
The Blind-gate	Hogge's-gate	1600-1662	between Dame Street and College Green	
Asoold's-gate	Essex Gate	1220	Close to Isolde's Tower	
Bungan's-gate		1577		

== See also ==
- John Speed's Map of Dublin (1610)
