= Bride Street =

Street in the Dublin, Ireland

- Children playing in front of 98 Bride Street, Dublin circa 1890

- Location within Central Dublin
- Native name: Sráid Bhríde (Irish)
- Former name: Saint Bridget Street
- Namesake: named after a church dedicated to Brigit of Kildare
- Location: Dublin, Ireland
- Postal code: D08
- north end: Werburgh Street
- south end: New Bride Street

Bride Street (Irish: Sráid Bhríde) is a street in the medieval area of Dublin, Ireland.

== Location ==
Bride Street runs from Werburgh Street at the north to New Bride Street at the south. It runs parallel to Patrick Street.

== History ==
Bride Street appears in a 1465 map of Dublin as "Synt Bryd stret". The St. Bride's Church for which the street is named is first mentioned in 1178.

A later iteration of this church was demolished in the late 1800s to make way for the Iveagh Trust housing scheme. Adelaide Hospital was originally located at 42 Bride Street until 1846.

Many of the older buildings on Bride Street were demolished during the 1960s to 1980s to widen the road for increased vehicular traffic. Before this, it was one of the streets illustrated by Flora Mitchell for her book Vanishing Dublin. It depicts the store owned by a noted Dublin character, Johnny Foxes.

Molyneux House sat on the corner of Bride Street and Peter Street and was constructed around 1710 and was one of the oldest houses in Dublin until its demolition in 1943. It formed the Molyneux Asylum from 1815 until it moved to Leeson Park in 1862.

It later gave its name to another Molyneux House, a converted church and modern office extension that was once the offices of the architect Sam Stephenson who also designed the conversion and extension in 1973. It was adjacent to the site of the old Bird Market, and Stephenson provided the traders with a walled side garden from which they continued to trade. As of 2026, the old church to the rear has been demolished with the brutalist office front facade retained as part of a modern hotel development.

There is a plaque to John Field on the corner of Bride Street and Golden Lane. Some of the series of plaques created by artist Chris Reid are on Bride Street, with quotes from local residents of the area.
