= Patrick Street, Dublin =

Street in the Dublin, Ireland

Patrick Street
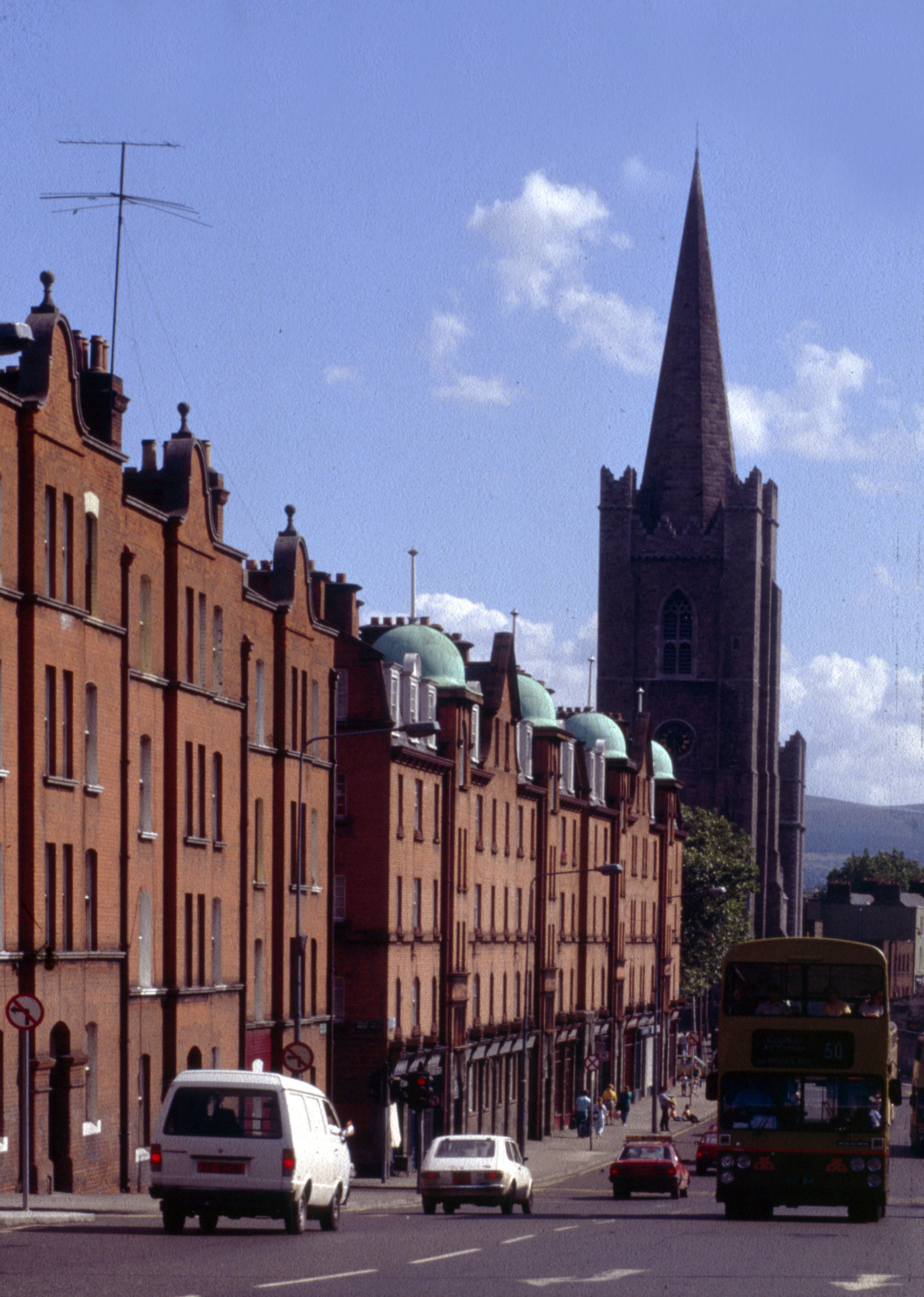
- Patrick Street in 1989
- Native name: Sráid Phádraig (Irish)
- Former name: St Patrick's Street
- Namesake: named after St Patrick's Cathedral
- Location: Dublin, Ireland
- Postal code: D08
- north end: Nicholas Street
- south end: New Street

Patrick Street (Irish: Sráid Phádraig) is a street in the medieval area of Dublin, Ireland.

== Location ==
Patrick Street runs from Nicholas Street at the north to New Street at the south. It runs parallel to Bride Street.

== History ==
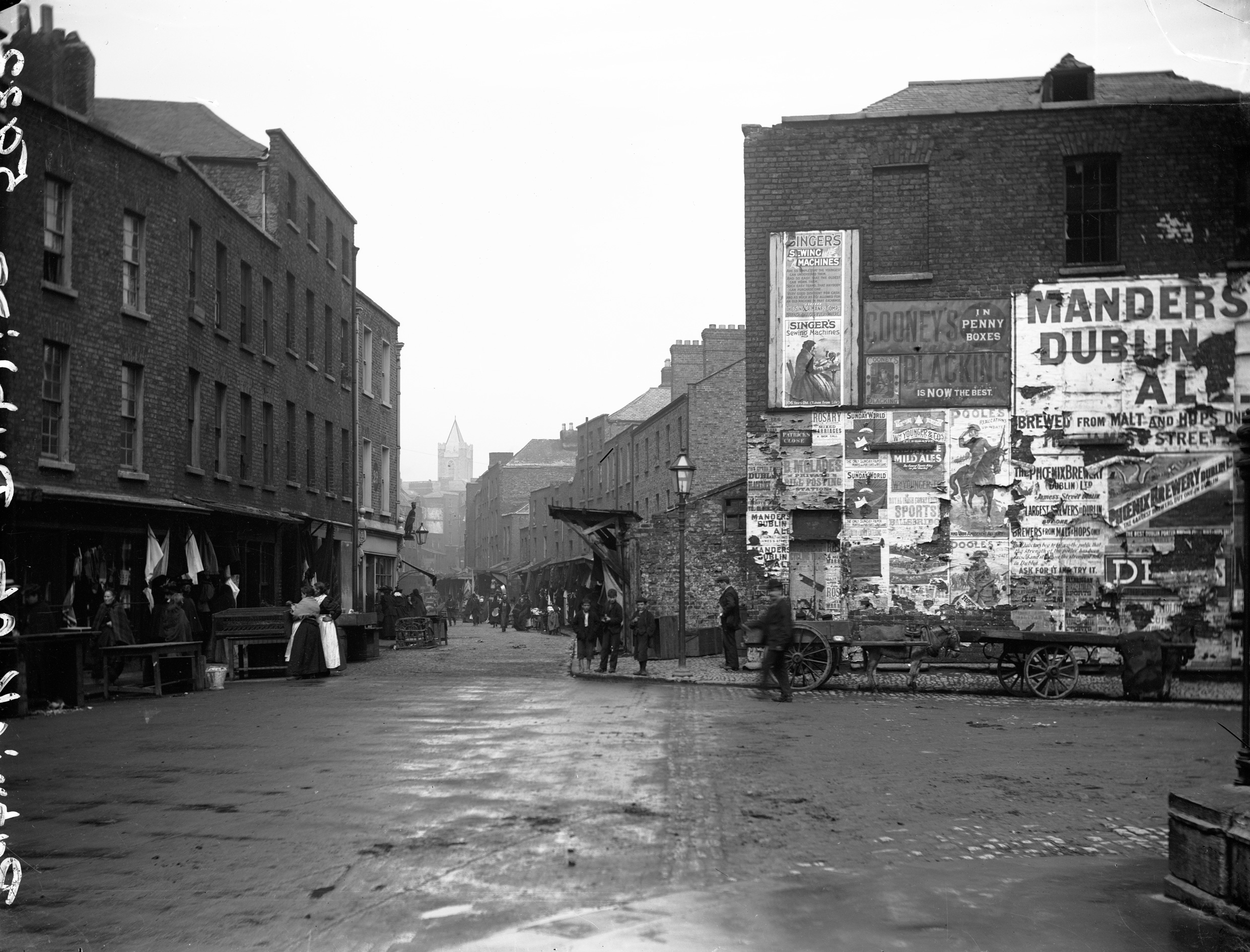
Patrick Street circa 1898

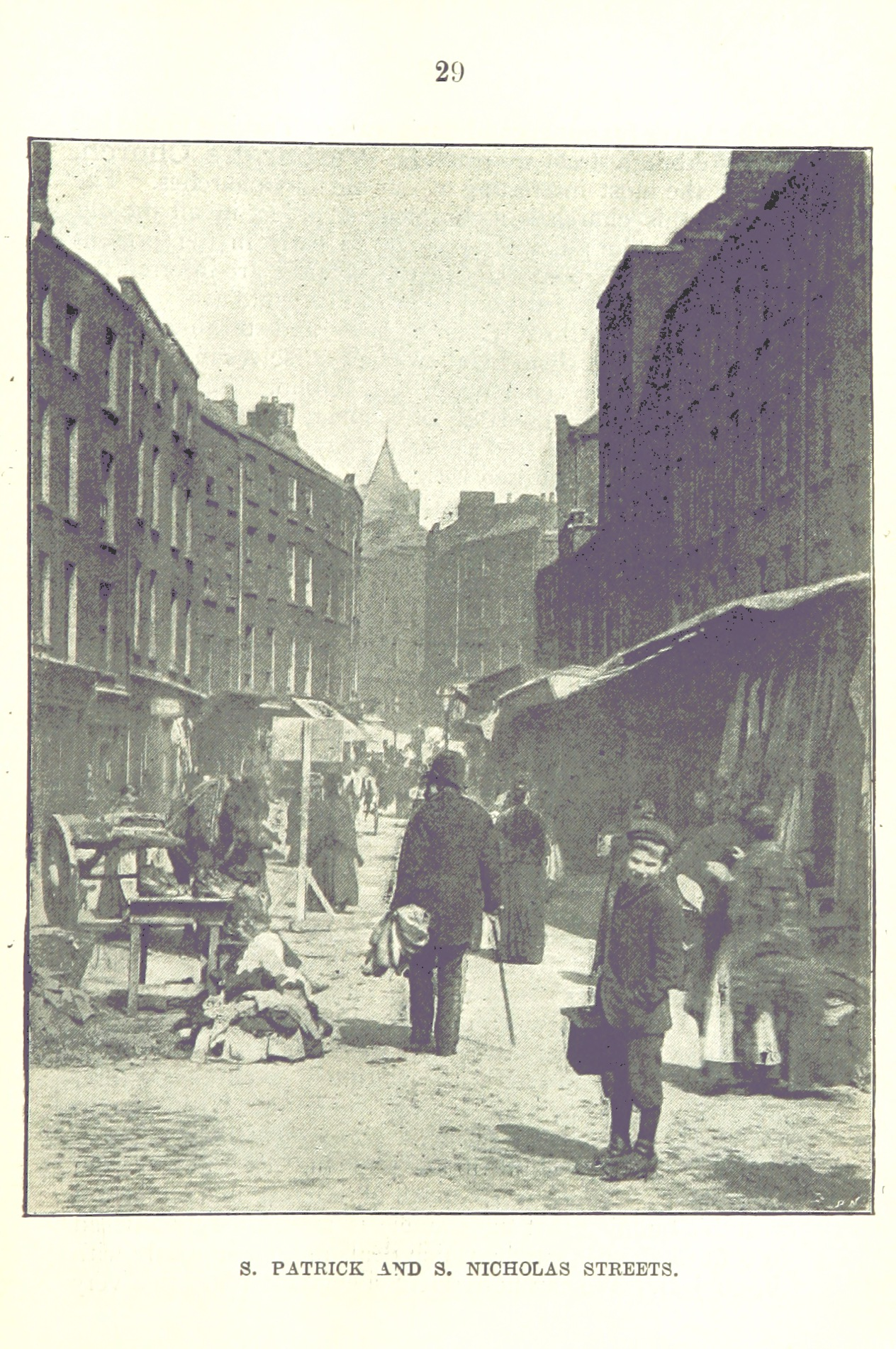
Patrick Street circa 1895 looking north

Originally recorded as St Patrick's Street from 1285, the thoroughfare was named for St Patrick's Church, which was later replaced with St Patrick's Cathedral.

In 1803, in the run-up to Robert Emmet's rebellion, the victims of a powerful explosion at his ammunition depot in Patrick Street were brought to Dr Steevens' Hospital. They included Darby Byrne and one of the Keenans, who were blown up at the time of the explosion and died in the hospital afterwards.

In the mid-20th century, the junction of Patrick Street, New Street, Kevin Street and Dean Street was referred to as "the Four Corners of Hell", in reference to four notorious pubs on each corner in this area of The Liberties. When the pubs closed the influx of people led to rowdy behaviour and street fights. The four pubs, now all demolished, were Kenny's, Quinn's, O'Beirne's and Lowe's. This junction was also previously known as Cross Poddle.

=== Road widening ===
The road widening of Patrick Street, Nicholas Street, and High Street has been viewed as resulting in this medieval area of Dublin becoming fragmented and difficult to navigate as a pedestrian.
