= Wide Streets Commission =

Commission in Dublin, Ireland, 1758

Ad hoc statutory body overview
- Formed: 1758
- Jurisdiction: Dublin
- Headquarters: The Tholsel (1758 - ?)
- Ad hoc statutory body executive: John Beresford, Chief Commissioner

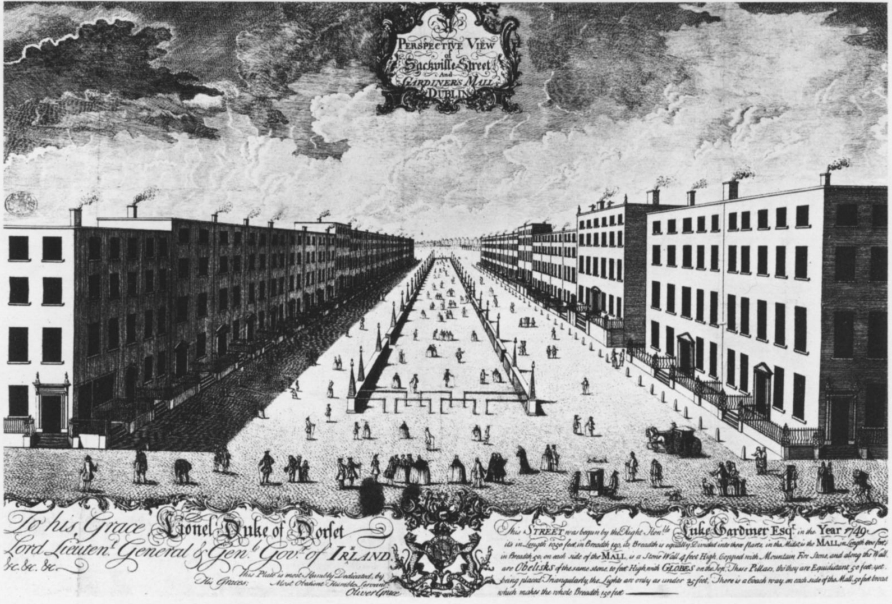
Sackville Street (as represented in this mid-18th century etching) was created by demolishing the buildings on the western side of Drogheda Street

The Wide Streets Commission (officially the Commissioners for making Wide and Convenient Ways, Streets and Passages) was established by an act of Parliament in 1758, at the request of Dublin Corporation, as a body to govern standards on the layout of streets, bridges, buildings and other architectural and civic considerations in Dublin.

Other improvement commissioners in Dublin in the same era were the Pipe Water Committee for drinking water, the Paving Board for footpaths, public lighting and sewerage, and the Ballast Board for Dublin Port.

The various improvement commissioners were abolished when with the last of their functions being absorbed into Dublin Corporation in 1851.

== History ==
Parliament Street Act 1757
- Act of Parliament
- Parliament of Ireland
- Long title: An Act for making a wide and convenient way, street, and passage, from Essex-Bridge to the Castle of Dublin, and for other purposes therein mentioned.
- Citation: 31 Geo. 2. c. 19 (I)

Dates
- Royal assent: 29 April 1758
- Repealed: 1 August 1849
Other legislation
Amended by	33 Geo. 2. c. 15 (I); 7 Geo. 3. c. 7 (I)
Repealed by	Dublin Improvement Act 1849

The Wide Streets Commission was established in 1758 by the Parliament Street Act 1757 (31 Geo. 2. c. 19 (I)). Over the following decades, the commission reshaped the old medieval city of Dublin, and created a network of main thoroughfares by wholesale demolition or widening of old streets or the creation of entirely new ones.

One of the first projects was to widen Essex Bridge (now Grattan Bridge), in 1755 to cope with the traffic congestion caused by human, horse-drawn, and bovine traffic crossing the River Liffey from Capel Street. The building of Parliament Street and the Royal Exchange (now Dublin City Hall), to create a vista from across the river Liffey on Capel Street, soon followed.

Other major initiatives, under the then Chief Commissioner John Beresford, included the effort to merge and widen several narrow streets into one new street on Dublin's northside, creating Sackville Street (now called O'Connell Street). The main north–south axis of the city was thus moved from Capel Street and Parliament Street to the new thoroughfare further east.

The widening of Dame Street, between Cork Hill and College Green was the second great initiative of the commission. This work was initiated in 1777, but it was not until 1782 that the first new building was built at Palace Street. Christchurch and George's Street are also the result of the project of widening Georgian Dublin's congested streets. North Frederick Street was created from 1789 linking Sackville Street and Dorset Street.

Between 1785 and 1790 further phases of the Dame Street project was undertaken between George's Lane and Trinity Street. Drawings exist dated 1832 for the buildings between Fownes Street and Temple Lane.

Westmoreland Street (90 feet wide), and D'Olier Street (90 feet wide and designed by Henry Aaron Baker) and part of Burgh Quay (1806) including the new Corn Exchange, formed part of the work of the commission. Originally many of the new houses had 15 feet high granite shop fronts at street level which were divided into three bays, a narrow bay at each side, incorporating a door, and a wide bay at the middle of the facade for the display of goods. Many of these shopfronts still remain on the west side of d'Olier Street.

Many of the Wide Street Commission buildings can be seen today on streets with granite shopfronts at ground floor level and brick facades above. They are generally streets with standardised house designs such as Burgh Quay.

Wellington Quay – with its arcaded shop fronts – and Merchants Arch are also part of the commission's work, as are Eden Quay, Lower Abbey Street, Bachelor's Walk, and Beresford Place.

=== Cessation ===
The commission was abolished by the Dublin Improvement Act 1849 (12 & 13 Vict. c. 97), with the final meeting of the commission taking place on 2 January 1851.

== Other improvement commissioners ==
=== Paving board ===
The Paving Board had been appointed by an act of Parliament, the City of Dublin Act 1773 (13 & 14 Geo. 3. c. 22 (I)) of 1774, and were charged with the duty of "improving the streets by paving the roadway, altering the levels, and removing encroachments". They also had the power to re-order the numbering of houses. The body operated from a house on the corner of Nassau Street and Dawson Street and later moved to Langford House on Mary Street from around 1819 when it was referred to as the Paving House.

== See also ==
- Georgian Dublin
- History of Dublin
- Dublin Civic Trust

== Sources ==
- Simms, Dr. J. G. (1 December 1977). "Dublin in 1776". Dublin Historical Record. 31 (1). Dublin: Old Dublin Society: 2–13. JSTOR 30104025.
