= Gild Merchant =

Gild Merchants or Guild Merchants were local merchant guilds in medieval England and Ireland. They acted as both a guild and a form of local government.

Rules established by merchant guilds were often incorporated into the municipal charters granted to market towns, with incorporated societies of merchants in each town or city holding exclusive rights of doing business there. In many cases they became the governing body of a town.

== History ==
Gilds Merchant seem to have been an innovation from the Norman Conquest with the first positive mention of a merchant guild was in Canterbury when Anselm was Archbishop between 1093 and 1109. In the twelfth century many important English towns started getting Gild charters allowing guilds to enforce guild regulations through the law and this municipal self government invited contemporary comparisons with medieval communes. Of the one hundred and sixty towns represented in the parliaments of Edward I at least ninety-two had a gild merchant meant that historians concluded a guild merchants were found in every large town, including some little bigger than villages.

Guild merchants received their death-blow by the statute of Edward III which in 1335 allowed foreign merchants to trade freely in England.

== Powers and Constitution ==
The merchant guilds possessed extensive powers, including the control and monopoly of all the trades in the town, which involved the power of fining all traders who were not members of the guild for illicit trading, and of inflicting punishment for all breaches of honesty or offences against the regulations of the guild. They also had liberty of trading in other towns and of protecting their guildsmen wherever they were trading. They exercised supervision over the quality of goods sold, and prevented strangers from directly or indirectly buying or selling to the injury of the guild. Besides these commercial advantages the guild entered largely into the life of all its members. The guildsmen took their part as a corporate body in all religious celebrations in the town, organized festivities, provided for sick or impoverished brethren, undertook the care of their orphan children, and provided for Masses and dirges for deceased members. As time went on the merchant guilds became more exclusive, and when the rise of manufactures in the twelfth century caused an increase in the number of craftsmen, it was natural that these should organize on their own account and form their own guilds.

The organization of the merchant guilds is known from the constitutions or guild rolls with each guild presided over by one or two aldermen assisted by two or four wardens or échevins. These officials presided over the meetings of the society and administered its funds and estates and assisted by a council of twelve or twenty-four members. The guildsmen were originally the burgesses, property owners in the town, including holders of agricultural land as well as merchants; but over time membership could be inherited or purchased. Thus the eldest sons of guildsmen were often admitted without a fee with younger sons paying a reduced fee. Guildsmen could sell their rights and heiresses might exercise their membership either in person or through husbands or sons.

== Local Examples ==
The Preston Guild Merchant is an example of a still existing Gilt Merchant although it no longer has governing functions.

The Dublin Guild Merchant was the first in precedence among the Dublin Guilds commanding 31 of the seats in the Dublin Corporation until it was abolished in the 1840s.

London also did not have a Gild Merchant as the whole civic body as the London Guilds collectively organised, regulated and protected trade within the City.

== Sources ==
- Ashley, William (1888). Introduction to English Economic History and Theory. Vol. 1. London.
- Burton, Edwin; Marique, Pierre (1910). "Guilds" . In Herbermann, Charles (ed.). Catholic Encyclopedia. Vol. 7. New York: Robert Appleton Company.
- Doyle, Mel (1977). "The Dublin Guilds and Journeymen's Clubs". Saothar. 3: 6–14. JSTOR 23195202.
- Gross, Charles (1890). The Gild Merchant.
- Guinness, Henry S. (1922). "Dublin Trade Gilds". The Journal of the Royal Society of Antiquaries of Ireland. 12 (2): 143–163. JSTOR 25513267.
- Reynolds, Susan (1977). An Introduction to the History of English Medieval Towns. Oxford: Clarendon Press. ISBN 0-19-822455-9.
