= Dublin Guild Merchant =

- Holy Trinity Guild
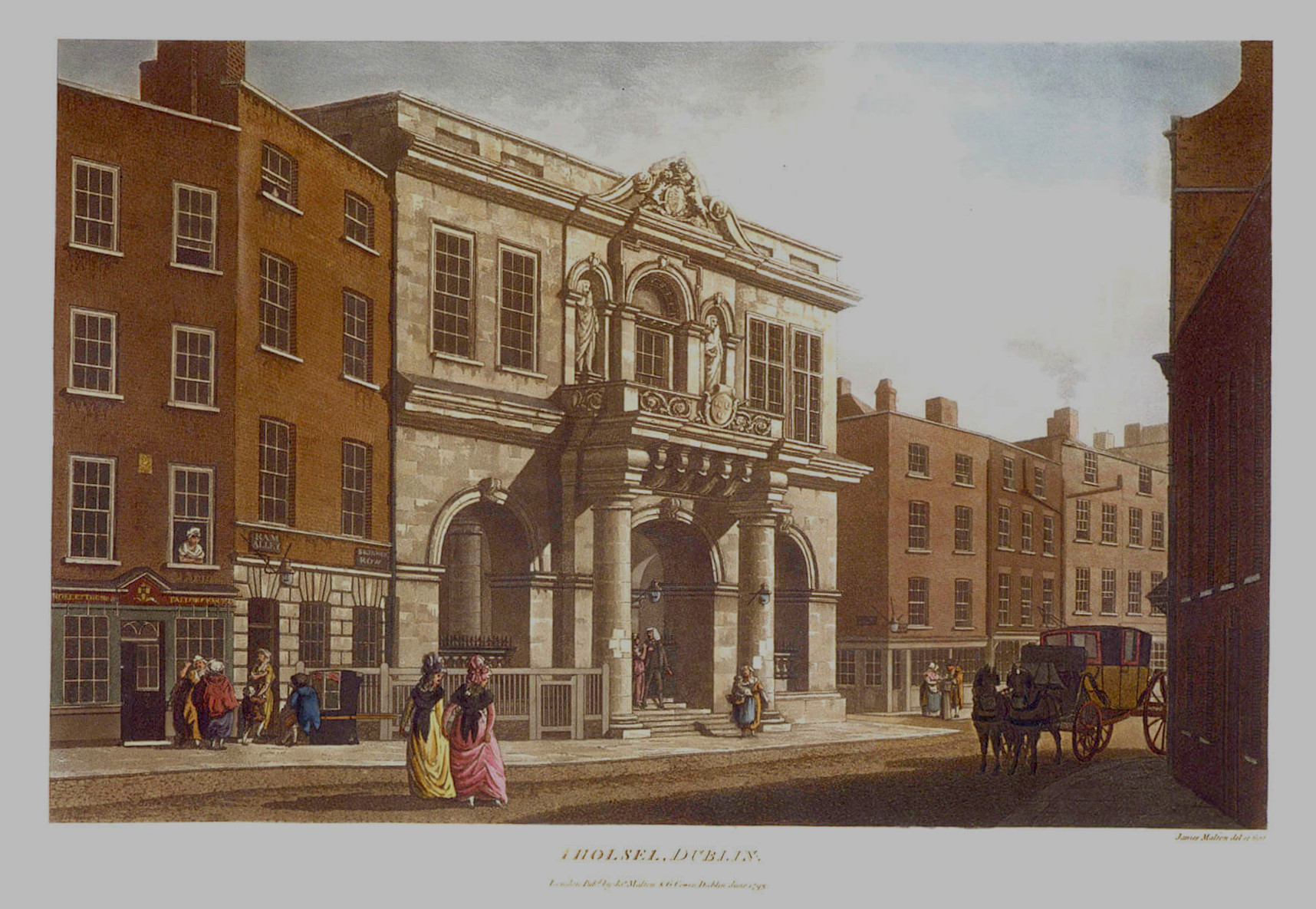
- An illustration of the Guild's then headquarters, the Tholsel, in c.1790
- Formation: c. 1190
- Dissolved: from Municipal Corporations (Ireland) Act 1840
- Type: Gild Merchant
- Headquarters: The Tholsel, Dublin (until 1809); later City Assembly House and Merchants' Hall
- Location: Dublin, Kingdom of Ireland
- Region served: City of Dublin

The Dublin Guild Merchant, also known as Holy Trinity Guild, was a Merchant Guild, and for many centuries the leading guild of Dublin.

== History ==
A Merchants' Guild existed in some form in Dublin by 1190, although the first explicit charters mentioned are 1438 and 1451. In 1226, it was allowing in craftsmen as well as merchants. In the thirteenth century, Dublin was designated, along with Drogheda and Cork, as a Port of the Staple, which would have involved the local Gild Merchant in the administration.

The guilds together elected 96 of the up to 144 members of the Common Council, the lower house of the City Assembly, the governing body of Dublin Corporation and so the city. 31 seats were controlled by the Merchants' Guild, and each of the others elected 2, 3 or 4 Common Councillors. A large number of the Lord Mayors of Dublin were associated with the Guild Merchant.

The Tailors ceded precedence to the Merchants, although the latter cooperated with the Tailors' Guild in regard to the Tailor's endowed school at Tailors' Hall.

The guild operated for most of its history from the Tholsel, the city's assembly hall, prior to the building's demolition in 1809. It moved to the City Assembly House, and later moved again to a dedicated premises, Merchants' Hall, on Wellington Quay, built c. 1821, by 1824. By the nineteenth century, the guild possessed two other properties, the rental of which covered operating expenses.

In 1841 the Municipal Corporations (Ireland) Act 1840 disempowered Dublin's guilds, and made the members of Dublin Corporation directly elected by a popular franchise.

== Sources ==
- Devine, Francis (1994). "Dublin's Trade Guilds: A Source for Labour Historians". Saothar. 19: 118–120. JSTOR 23197285.
- Doyle, Mel (1977). "The Dublin Guilds and Journeymen's Clubs". Saothar. 3: 6–14. JSTOR 23195202.
- Guinness, Henry S. (1922). "Dublin Trade Gilds". The Journal of the Royal Society of Antiquaries of Ireland. 12 (2): 143–163. JSTOR 25513267.
- Whelan, Edward (2012). "The guilds of Dublin and immigrants in the seventeenth century: The defence of privilege in an age of change". Irish Economic and Social History. 39: 26–38. doi:10.7227/IESH.39.1.2. JSTOR 24338816. S2CID 163690406.
- Wilson (1830). "Wilson's Dublin directory, for the year 1830...".
- Webb, John J. (1917). "The Guilds of Dublin". The Irish Monthly. 45 (530): 507–514. JSTOR 20504864.
