= Merchants' Hall =

Former guildhall in Dublin, Ireland

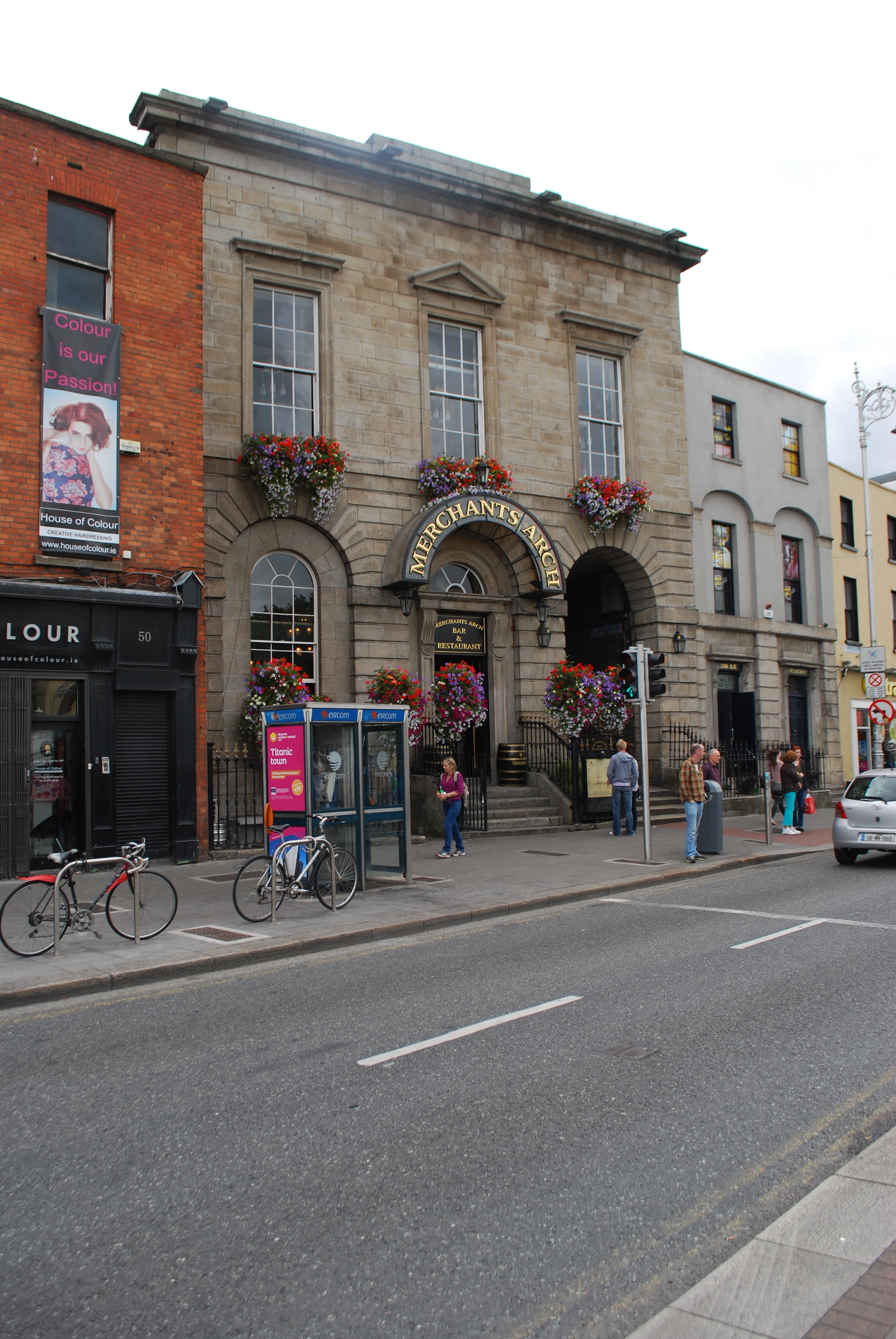
- A view of Merchants' Hall from Wellington Quay

- Location within Central Dublin
- Alternative names: Merchants' Arch

General information
- Type: guildhall
- Architectural style: Georgian
- Classification: Protected structure
- Location: 48-49 Wellington Quay, Dublin 2, Dublin, Ireland
- Coordinates: 53.34597°N 6.26281°W
- Current tenants: The Merchant's Arch pub and restaurant
- Completed: 1821 (205 years ago)
- Owner: Tom Doone (via Fusion Rock Limited), formerly owned by Brian and Mary Patricia O'Donnell

Technical details
- Material: Granite faced with brick chimneys and calp rear and sides
- Floor count: 2 storey over raised basement

Design and construction
- Architect: Frederick Darley
- Designations: Protected Structure (RPS 8375)

Website
- www.merchantsarch.ie

Merchants' Hall (sometimes Merchants' Arch) is a former 19th century guildhall, now a protected structure, on Wellington Quay in Dublin, Ireland. It is located opposite the Ha'penny Bridge and backs on to Temple Bar. The building was the last of the city guildhalls to be constructed and operated as a guildhall for 20 years before the Dublin Guild Merchant ended its main work, along with other Guilds of the City of Dublin.

Since that time until 2021 it has had a number of uses including as a boys school, a factory, a retail unit, a fast food restaurant and a pub. As of 2021, a pub named "Merchants' Arch" operates from the premises.

== History ==
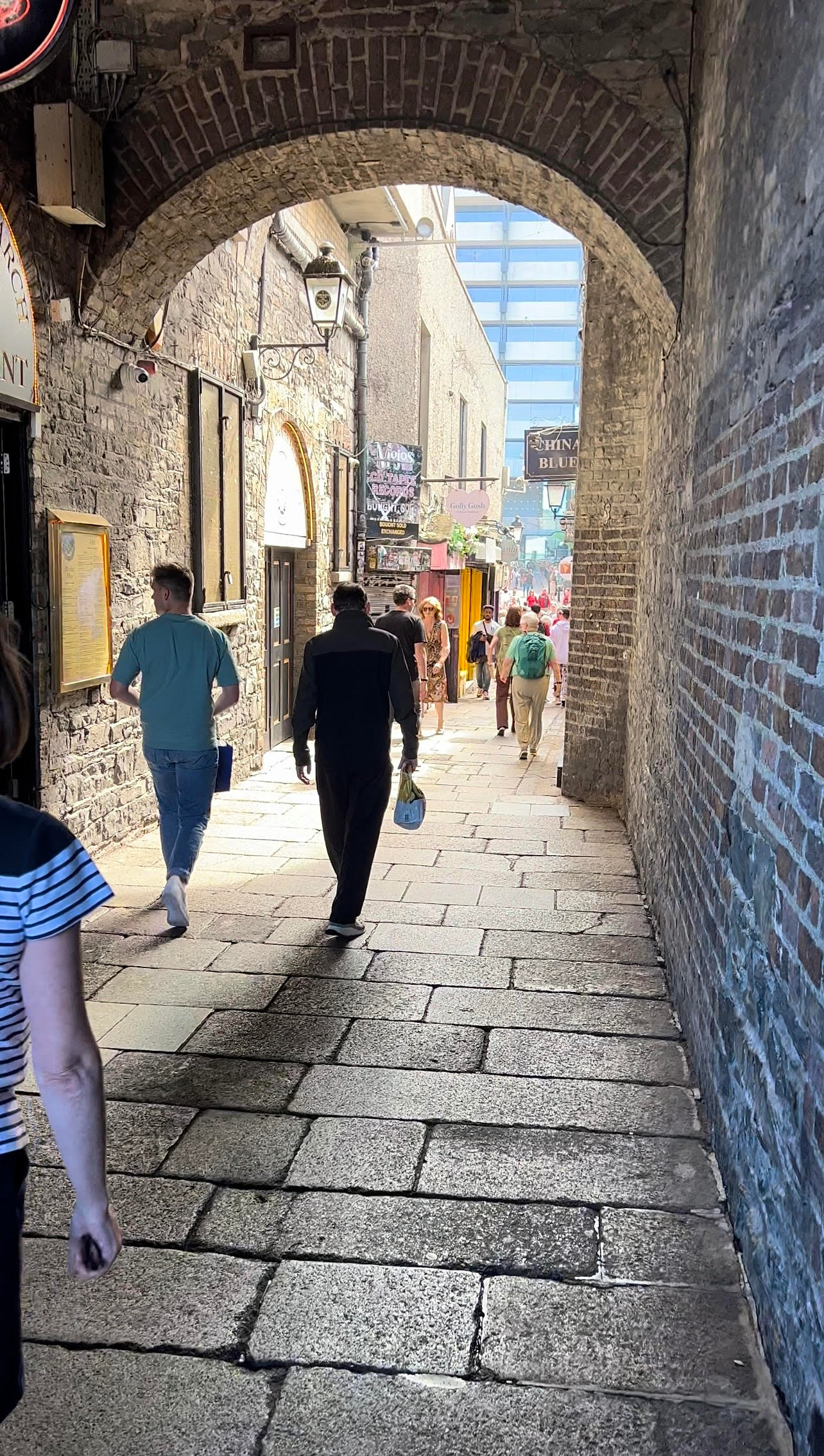
View of Merchants' Arch leading to Temple Bar with the former Central Bank of Ireland HQ in the background

Wellington Quay was laid out by the Wide Street Commissioners in 1815 and, following completion of the quay, it offered a site to the Merchant's guild for the construction of a new dedicated hall. Previously, buildings in the area had backed directly on to the Liffey.

The Merchants' Guild operated from the premises for a period of roughly 20 years from the construction of the building in 1821 until 1841, when the Municipal Reform Act saw the dissolution of the city guilds. This dissolution followed a move to directly elected Dublin Corporation members. Prior to 1821, the Merchant's Guild had operated from the Tholsel and City Assembly House on South William Street along with several other of the city guilds.

The commissioners imposed a covenant which forced the construction of the vaulted archway synonymous with the building and provided for a public right of way through the site under the arch as a means of enabling public access from the quays and Ha'penny Bridge through to Crown Alley and Temple Bar. This laneway is today also named "Merchants' Arch" and forms the main entrance to the Temple Bar area for members of the public crossing over from the Northside of the Liffey.

From 1873, the hall became the Merchant Tailors' Endowed School after it moved from Tailors' Hall until the school finally closed in 1910.

Later the building housed PA Noonan & Co Ltd (a shirt manufacturer) and R Atkinson & Company (poplin manufacturers).

== Building ==
The building is a three-bay two-storey over raised basement granite-faced Georgian townhouse. There are ashlar calp walls to the sides and rear of the property while the chimneystacks are constructed in brown brick. The roughly pyramidal shaped roof is partially hidden behind a parapet and there is a modern roof light to the apex of the roof.

In 2021, a hotel development proposed to be built at 1-4 Merchant's Arch laneway, was controversially granted planning permission.

== See also ==
- Tailors' Hall
- Weavers' Hall, Dublin
