= City Assembly House =

Georgian gallery in Dublin, Ireland

- Former names: The Exhibition Rooms

General information
- Type: Gallery
- Architectural style: Georgian
- Location: Ireland
- Coordinates: 53.3420383°N 6.2627304°W
- Current tenants: Irish Georgian Society
- Construction started: 1764
- Estimated completion: 1771
- Renovated: 1810 (as assembly rooms of Dublin Corporation)

Technical details
- Material: Portland stone (window and door surrounds), red brick facade (1st and 2nd storeys), granite (steps, basement and ground floor facade)
- Floor count: 3

Design and construction
- Architect: Oliver Grace
- Developer: Society of Artists in Ireland (Simon Vierpyl and Richard Cranfield)

City Assembly House is a Georgian gallery, exhibition space and office developed by the Society of Artists in Ireland as a purpose-built venue to hold exhibitions and display the works of Irish artists. It is often claimed to have been the first purpose-built art gallery in either the UK or Ireland.

As of 2023, the building acts as a gallery and as the headquarters of the Irish Georgian Society, having formerly served as the seat of Dublin Corporation.

== Naming ==
The name is a reference to the City Assembly which survived until the Municipal Corporations (Ireland) Act 1840 and was broadly the governing body of what was later to be called Dublin Corporation, and from 2002, Dublin City Council.

The City Assembly met at the building from around 1791-1852.

== History ==
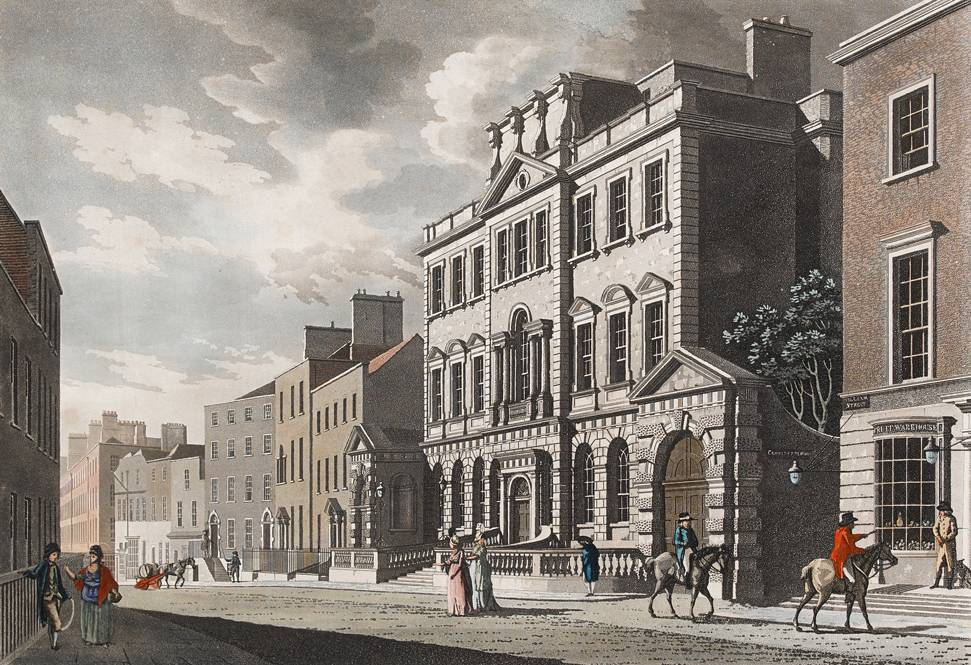
The Exhibition Rooms (right) from c1791 in one of James Malton's views of Dublin situated beside Powerscourt House.

=== Society of Artists in Ireland ===
The construction of the building on South William Street, Dublin was driven by two of the most prominent founding members of the Society of Artists in Ireland, the sculptor Simon Vierpyl and woodcarver and gilder Richard Cranfield. The society itself had only been established in 1764 with 12 members following an attempt by the Dublin Society to create its own annual exhibition and society.

Following the success of a show in 1765 at Charles Napper's Great Room on George's Lane, the Society of Artists decided to construct their own dedicated art academy and exhibition space on a site leased from Maurice Coppinger. The funds were raised for its construction by the issue of lifetime tickets to exhibitions held at the venue by subscribers of three guineas. At that stage the number of members had expanded to 27.

On the 10th of March 1766 they had their second exhibition of 106 works at the partially constructed building. It appears that the design can likely be attributed to Oliver Grace, who displayed drawings and plans for the front facade in 1768 titled 'an elevation, proposed as a front to the Exhibition Room'.

By 1771, enough funds had been raised for the completion of the building with the help of grants of £500 from the Irish Parliament in 1767. At the same time in 1771, Powerscourt House had just commenced construction across the opposite side of Coppinger Row.

The teaching and academy element of the project was ultimately abandoned however the building continued to host various exhibitions.

Following a schism in the Society in 1773, the Society reconciled again in the following years with the last exhibition recorded as occurring in the building in 1780. After 1780, it is said that no public art exhibition was held in Dublin until 1800.

=== Other uses ===
After that point, the building was used for a variety of uses including auctions, theatrics and balls.

=== City Assembly ===
In 1791, the City Assembly, the governing body of Dublin Corporation, began to hold its meetings at the property as The Tholsel on Skinners Row, where it had previously convened, had become dilapidated and structurally unsound. At that point ownership of the building was held by Richard Cranfield who took over paying interest on the bonds which had been issued for its construction.

In 1809, after the death of Richard Cranfield, the corporation took the building on a 100-year lease with extensive refurbishment works taking place in 1810. Notable craftspeople involved included the carpenter Benjamin Eaton, plasterer Charles Thorp, bricklayer William Fell and the stonecutter and architect Frederick Darley.

For a short period after the demolition of the Tholsel and erection of the dedicated Merchants' Hall, the building was occupied also by the Merchant's Guild between 1809 and 1824.

In 1852, the corporation moved to the Royal Exchange on Dame Street. At that point the Dublin Court of Conscience moved upstairs to the octagonal room where it remained until it was abolished following the introduction of the Courts of Justice Act 1924. The space below was then used as a station for the Dublin Fire Brigade, which was its infancy at that time and is shown as such on an 1864 OS map.

=== Old Dublin Society and Civic Museum ===
The Old Dublin Society also met at the octagonal room in the building from 1934. In conjunction with Dublin Corporation, the society founded a Dublin Civic Museum which was located at the building from 1953 to 2003.

=== Irish Georgian Society ===
From 2012, the Irish Georgian Society restored the building and the premises now hosts its headquarters as well as exhibition space and gift shops as of 2025.

== See also ==
- Royal Irish Institution
