= Dublin Assay Office =

Irish metallurgic organisation established in 1637

The Company of Goldsmiths of the City of Dublin
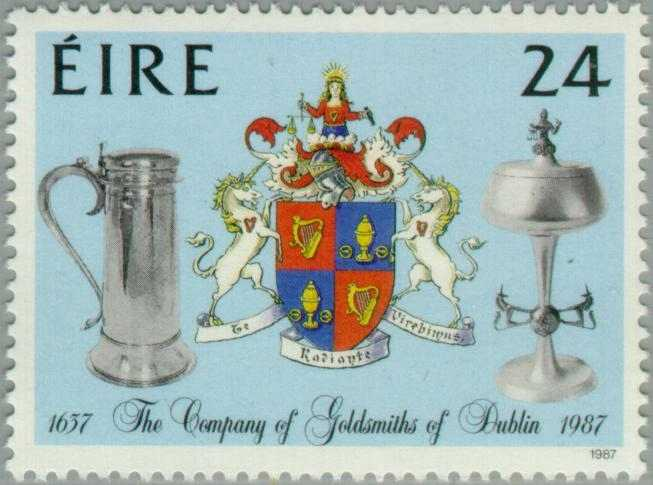
- Goldsmiths Company Coat of Arms on a commemorative postage stamp
- Location: Dublin Castle; Dublin 2 (since 1925)
- Date of formation: 1637
- Company association: Workers in precious metals
- Website: Company of Goldsmiths of Dublin and Assay Office

The Dublin Assay Office was established in 1637 to supervise the assaying of all gold and silver throughout the whole Kingdom of Ireland, when the Dublin Company of Goldsmiths was founded by royal charter (13 Charles I), re-establishing the medieval Guild of All Saints.

Initially, hallmarks consisted of the goldsmiths' proper mark which was the maker's mark originally used to identify the silversmith or goldsmith responsible for making the article. The fineness mark, the crowned harp, was applied to 22 carat gold and sterling silver, which was silver of a standard of 925 parts of fine silver in each 1,000.

In 1638 a date letter system was introduced and used in conjunction with the above marks. This date letter denotes the year in which the piece was made or hallmarked and is changed on 1 January each year. A new mark in the form of Hibernia was introduced on 25 March 1730 to indicate that a duty had been paid on all articles manufactured on or after that date. The Hibernia mark is used on all articles of Irish manufacture hallmarked at the Dublin Assay Office.

Up until 1923, the Dublin Assay Office was subjected to the same laws governing silver production in England and Scotland, and thus marked its wares in a similar manner. The formation of the Irish Free State in 1922 meant that the laws were made and governed from Dublin, but the system of hallmarking has largely stayed the same.

== Dublin Company of Goldsmiths (Guild of All Saints) ==
The Dublin Assay Office continues to be run by the Company of Goldsmiths, one of only two extant direct successors of medieval guilds in Dublin; the other is the Company of Apothecaries' Hall in Dublin (the direct successor of the Guild of St Luke).

The Guild of Goldsmiths (of All Saints) was known to have existed prior to 1557 when a replacement of its medieval charter was sought. When it was re-incorporated as a Company in 1637, it was 16th in order of precedence of the Dublin guilds. It included watch and clock makers. The guild colours were red, yellow and white (1767).

== Location ==
In 1696, it is known to have met in the London Stone Tavern, but in 1709 Goldsmiths' Hall was built in Werburgh Street (the Hall being the source of 'hallmarks').

In 1812, the Goldsmiths' Company moved to 22 Golden Lane, and in 1838 to the basement of the Custom House.

After the Custom House burned down in 1921, the Goldsmiths – and the Assay Office – moved to Dublin Castle in 1925 from where they continue to exercise scrutiny and control over gold and silver ware throughout Ireland, subject to various acts of Parliament over the years, often relating to duties imposed.

== See also ==
- Guilds of the City of Dublin
