= Irish Guild of Weavers, Spinners, and Dyers =

- Abbreviation: IGWSD
- Predecessor: Weavers' Guild
- Formation: 1975
- Founder: Lillias Mitchell
- Type: educational and representative association
- Region served: Ireland
- Members: hand weavers, spinners and dyers
- Official language: English
- Affiliations: Associated Guild of Weavers, Spinners and Dyers (UK)
- Website: www.weavespindye.ie

The Irish Guild of Weavers, Spinners, and Dyers (IGWSD) is an organisation for the promotion and preservation of hand weaving, spinning and dyeing in Ireland.

Editions of the IGWSD's newsletter are stored in the National Library of Ireland.

== Foundation ==
The Guild was founded in 1975 by Lillias Mitchell. The Guild has three stated aims:

- To promote and encourage the crafts of Weaving, Spinning & Dyeing.
- To educate through workshops, lectures and demonstrations.
- To compile a library and information on materials and equipment.

The members include artists, amateurs, and beginners.

Another one of its aims was to rekindle enthusiasm for classic forms of handweaving, spinning, and dyeing, which had been losing popularity.

As described in Irish Tweed: History, Tradition, Fashion, the IGWSD, following its establishment, replaced the original Weavers' Guild, and initially published a regular newsletter and hosted monthly meetings, as well as educational events.

== Activities ==
The Guild holds meetings, workshops, exhibitions, and demonstrations nationwide. They also participate in the annual Knitting and Stitching Show in the Royal Dublin Society. The Irish Guild of Weavers, Spinners and Dyers traditionally held a major annual exhibition in Dublin. The Guild hold events for all levels, including introductory classes. Locally, the IGWSD is a network of regional groups. It runs workshops across the country. In 1987, the Book of the Irish Countryside stated that the Guild "does much to promote interest in natural dyes." It previously had a representative on the Design & Crafts Council of Ireland. The Guild participated in an RTÉ historical exhibition in Merrion Square as part of its 1916 Easter Rising commemorations. The Irish Guild of Weavers, Spinners and Dyers (IGWSD) is affiliated to the Associated Guild of Weavers, Spinners and Dyers in the UK.

== See also ==
- Weavers' Hall, Dublin
