= Cook Street, Dublin =

Street in central Dublin, Ireland

Cook Street
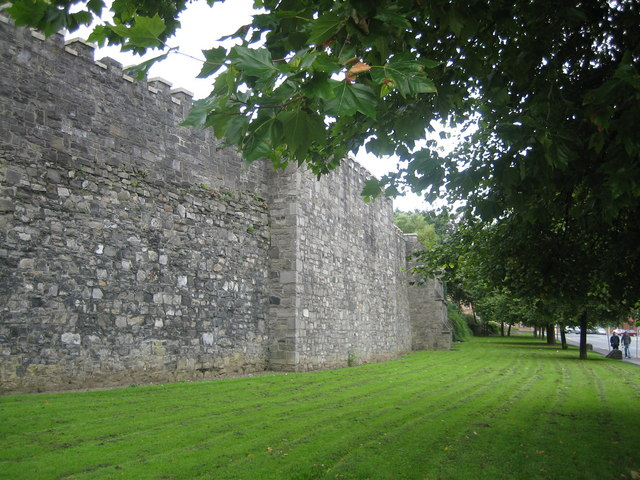
- Dublin city walls on Cook Street
- Interactive map of Cook Street
- Native name: Sráid na gCócairí (Irish)
- Namesake: historical location of the cooks' guild
- Postal code: D08
- Coordinates: 53.3442°N 6.27326°W
- west end: Bridge Street
- east end: Winetavern Street

Cook Street (Irish: Sráid na gCócairí) is a street in Dublin running from Bridge Street to Winetavern Street, in the heart of Medieval Dublin.

== History ==
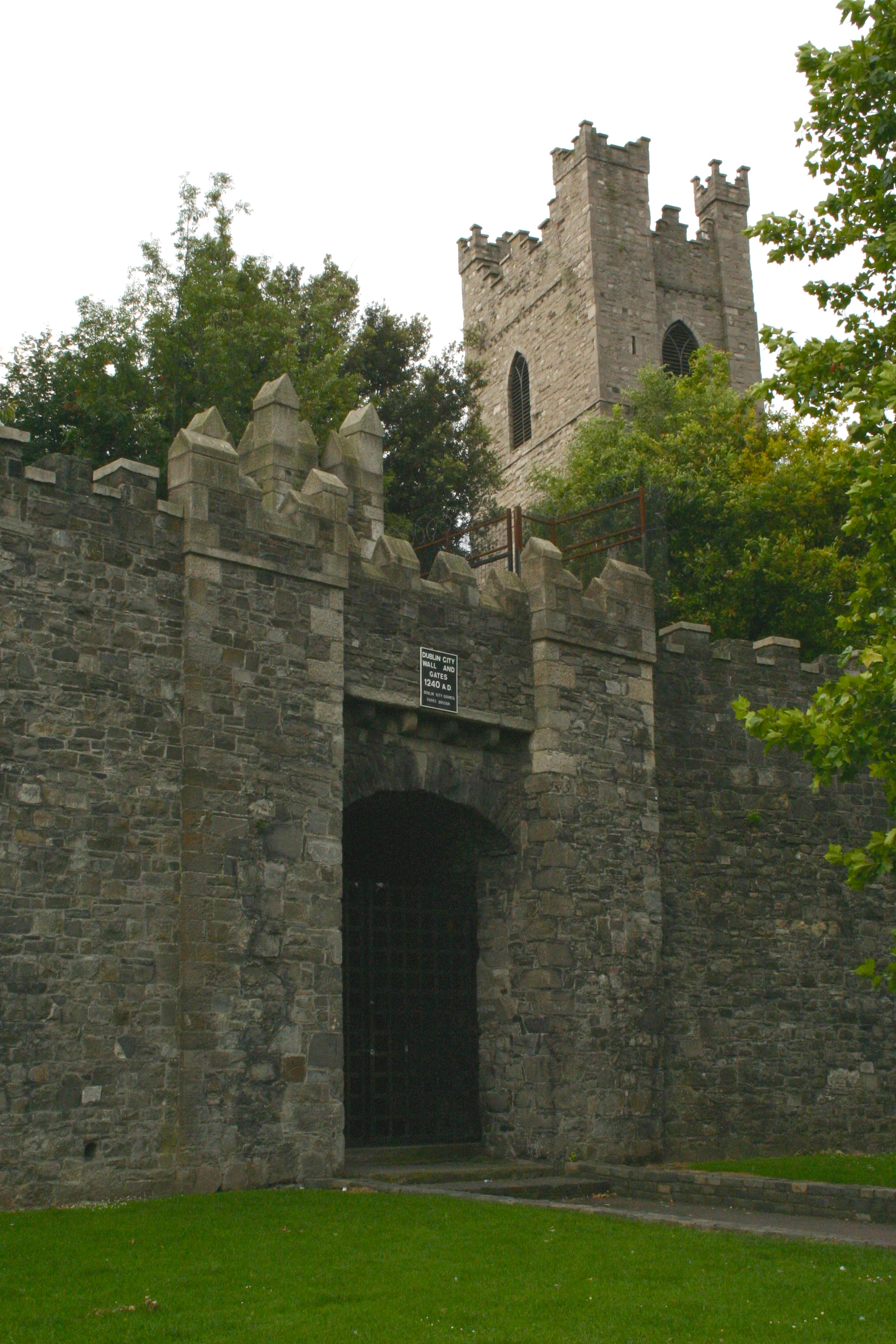
St Audoen's Church and Arch as seen from Cook Street

Cook Street is named for the Guild of Cooks, one of the Guilds of the City of Dublin, whose guildhall was on the street. It appears on maps from 1270, and was referred to as Vicus Cocorum (the street of the cooks) or Le Coke Street. The two last remaining pieces of the Dublin city walls visible above ground can be seen at St Audoen's Church at Cook Street and at Cornmarket nearby. This stretch of wall contains the only extant Dublin gate, known as St Audoen's Arch. This wall marked the northern edge of the medieval Dublin city. The wall is 10 metres high and 83 metres long. It is thought that cooks set up their businesses outside of the city walls due to the unhygienic conditions inside the walls of Dublin or due to the fire risk cooking fires and ovens would have posed to the primarily wooden structures inside the city walls. Being close to the River Liffey also supplied water should a fire break out.

Among the early residents of the street were the Burnell family and former Lord Mayor of Dublin, Sir James Carroll.

The street is noted on John Speed's Map of Dublin (1610) where it is referenced as 'Cocke Strete'.

A number of religious orders have historically resided on the street, including Carmelites, Franciscans, and Dominicans. The Franciscan monastery on Cook Street was destroyed on 26 December 1629 by a group led by Dr Launcelot Bulkeley, the Protestant Archbishop of Dublin. The Church of the Immaculate Conception, Dublin on Merchants Quay is commonly referred to as Adam and Eve's, named for the Adam and Eve tavern on Cook Street where Catholic mass was held secretly. Posing as tavern patrons, Catholics would give a guard the password "I am going to the Adam and Eve".

In the mid-1800s, Old Moore's Almanac was printed by John Nugent on Cook Street. At the time a large number of the businesses on Cook Street were coffin makers, leading to one of Nugent's rivals calling his Almanac "the Rushlight of Coffin Colony". In the early part of the 1800s, there were 16 coffin makers on Cook street. This fell to 5 by the end of the century.
