= Tailors' Hall =

Guildhall in Dublin, Ireland

Tailors Hall
- Halla na dTáilliúirí
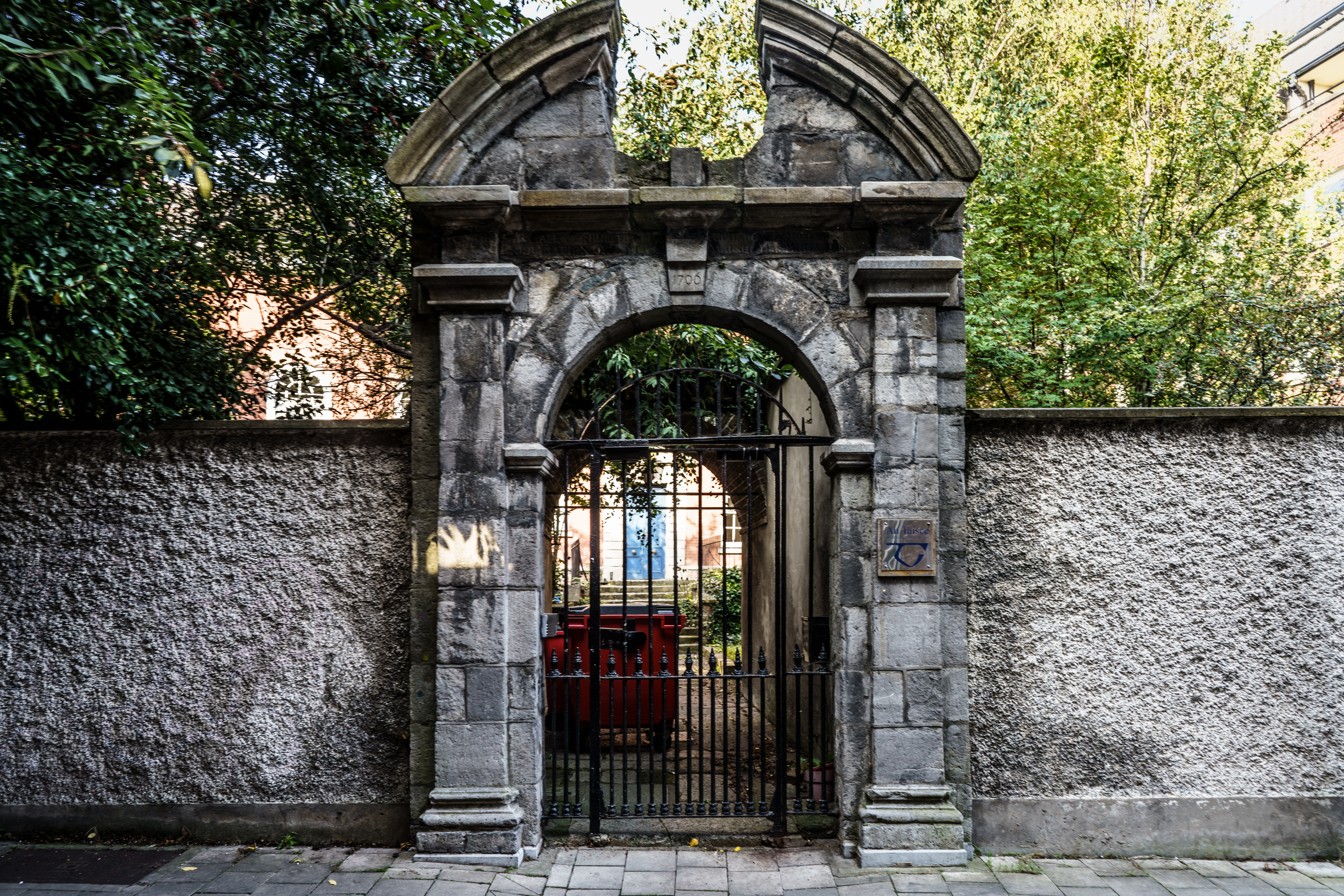
- Limestone entrance gate to Tailors' Hall with broken rounded pediment

- Location within Central Dublin
- Alternative names: Back Lane Parliament

General information
- Type: guildhall
- Architectural style: Queen Anne, Georgian
- Classification: Protected structure
- Location: Back Lane, off High Street, The Liberties, Dublin, Ireland, D08x2a3, Dublin, Ireland
- Coordinates: 53°20′34.5″N 06°16′24.1″W
- Current tenants: An Taisce
- Estimated completion: 1707
- Owner: Dublin City Council

Technical details
- Material: red brick, granite, limestone

Renovating team
- Awards: Europa Nostra Award 1988

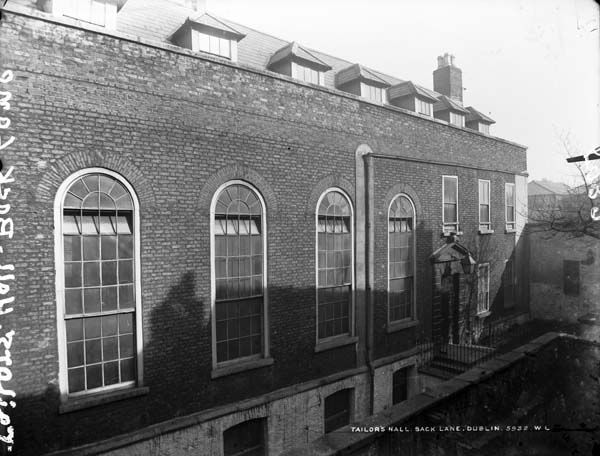
Tailors' Hall c1900.

Tailors' Hall is the oldest of two surviving guildhalls in Dublin, Ireland. It is located on Back Lane, off High Street, in the part of the city known as the Liberties. Aside from meetings of its own and many other of the guilds of Dublin, the hall has hosted many social, cultural and educational events. It has been used as a court-house, a barracks, a school, a place of worship and in place of Dublin's City Hall. It was also a meeting place of the United Irishmen, and the site of the Back Lane Parliament. The Tailors' Guild having fully released it by 1873, the building hosted a Christian Mission and later the Legion of Mary. The building having become uninhabitable by the mid-20th century, the Irish Georgian Society launched a restoration campaign in 1966, and it was reopened in 1971. It now holds the headquarters of Ireland's national heritage charity, An Taisce, and can be visited, and rented for events.

== Location ==
The building is on Back Lane, off High Street, near Christ Church Cathedral, which overlooks the River Liffey. The hall lies within the Liberties, and the postal district of Dublin 8.

== History ==
=== Early history ===
The Corporation of Tailors, Tailors' Guild or Guild of Merchant Tailors historically claimed to be the oldest guild in Dublin, chartered in 1207 by King John, Lord of Ireland, although the oldest charter physically traced dates to 1418, as granted by King Henry V. A second charter, of 1419, elaborated the powers of what was formally the Fraternity of St John the Baptist; these powers included a right to search out clothes being made for sale by anyone not a member of the guild. The Tailors' Hall of Dublin, then located in Winetavern Street, is first mentioned in records in 1539; it was succeeded by a new hall on land belonging to the guild on one side of Back Lane, built in 1583 and 1584.

The foundation of the current building, across Back Lane from the previous hall, was laid in 1703. The site had previously held a Jesuit chapel and college, later annexed to Trinity College Dublin and then again a Mass-house; remnants of this earlier building may be embedded in the current building. The hall was built by contractors Wolfinton and Taylor, with their overseer (a Mr Mills) and team of craftsmen. It was completed in 1707. It was described as having, on one side of the entrance, a principal room of 45 by 21 feet (13.7 by 6.4 m), with a gallery, a throne for the Guild Master, and paintings of Dean Swift, a St Homohon and two past kings. On the other side of the entrance was a smaller meeting room, and there was a stairs from basement to attics.

The main Georgian doorcase to the building off back lane was added around 1770-71 along with a bust of George III.

=== Uses ===
Aside from their own meetings, the guild commissioned the hall to be suitable for leasing, and included living quarters (a kitchen, parlour and garrets) also for rental. Rental uses included meetings of other Dublin guilds (including those of the shoemakers, hosiers, glovers, shearmen, smiths, joiners, brewers, and apothecaries and barber-surgeons), and the Freemasons, along with Methodist and Baptist gatherings, and classes such as dancing and fencing, as well as balls, theatrical performances, concerts and drawings of lotteries. In 1785, lettings for dancing, fencing and drama were discontinued, due to damage they caused. In 1771, the main hall was also dedicated for services of the Church of Ireland.

Tailors' Hall also hosted some meetings of the city council (the Board of Aldermen and Common Council of Dublin Corporation), including one at which a mayor, Henry Gore Sankey, and sheriffs including James Napper Tandy, were elected, and a vote of thanks to Lord Henry Fitzgerald and Henry Grattan were passed. It was also a meeting place for the United Irishmen in Dublin, and the site of the Back Lane Parliament, which developed a petition on behalf of Irish Catholics which was successfully presented to the King in London; one result of the petition was the opening of the Dublin Guilds to Catholic membership, starting with the Dublin Tailors.

=== 1798 to 1810 ===
In 1798 the hall was taken over temporarily by the British Army as they accommodated extra troops to suppress the 1798 Rebellion. In 1799 the Tailors, meeting at the hall, opposed the proposed Acts of Union of 1800, and a decade later passed a motion regretting the Union and the damage it had done to Dublin and business. The hall also functioned as the court house of the Court of Insolvent Debtors for around three years around 1820.

=== The Endowed School ===
Legal reforms in the mid-19th century, after a parliamentary report noted the loss of the monopolies of the guilds over trades, included the Municipal Corporations (Ireland) Act 1840 (3 & 4 Vict. c. 108) which removed their voting rights in city corporations. After this, the Dublin Tailors sold most of their moveable property to fund a trust. The trustees were directed to, and did, form a school, the Merchant Tailors' Endowed School, which took up to 50 Protestant pupils, descended from members of the Tailors' Guild, and otherwise from the Merchants' Guild or other Freemen of Dublin. The school moved to the Merchants' Guild Hall, at Merchants' Arch by the Ha'penny Bridge, in 1873 and the hall passed to Dublin Corporation.

=== Later uses ===
The lease of Tailors' Hall was taken by a Christian Mission, sometimes known as the Mission to the Liberties. The Mission ran, among other things, a Sunday School, a clothes-making society (the Dorcas Society) for poor families, and a winter coal savings scheme, as well as a coffee shop operating at-cost and with a lending library but without alcohol and gambling. The Mission operated until 1949, when Dublin Corporation deemed the hall to have become unsafe.

The Workers' Union of Ireland planned to take over the building but never actually moved, and the lease was taken by the Legion of Mary until the Corporation decided it had become wholly uninhabitable. With limited security and maintenance, the building was damaged, and a major fireplace stolen, but then recovered.

=== Restoration ===
In 1966 the Irish Georgian Society established a committee to try to restore Tailors' Hall, securing support from the Old Dublin Society, the Wolfe Tone Society, Irish Congress of Trade Unions, Emmet Society, An Taisce, Belfast Trades Council, Merchant Tailors' Company, and others. A public meeting was held "to save the building from demolition" in October 1966, followed by a Bring-and-Buy Sale at the Mansion House. Funds were raised from donations, lecture tours by Desmond Guinness, guided tours of historic buildings, and events organised by the supporting organisations. The committee established a dedicated company, the Tailors' Hall Fund, Limited. Initial estimates of the budget needed to restore the building ranged from 15 to 50 thousand pounds, later refined to about 20 thousand pounds. The first £5,000 of fundraising allowed the securing of walls – including repointing of the brick courses – and roof, with the windows to follow, then interiors. Lead architect Austin Dunphy and fellow architect Daithi Hanly volunteered their services but all other services were secured on commercial terms. During the restoration some signs that parts of the building might date to the 17th century were found. It was handed over to the Tailors' Hall Fund for a nominal rent of one shilling, for 99 years, in 1968, with the keys passed from the Lord Mayor to Desmond Guinness. It reopened on 17 April 1971.

=== An Taisce ===
The National Trust for Ireland, An Taisce, took the leasehold of the building from Dublin Corporation on 1 February 1984, and operates it as its headquarters, sometimes letting some of the facilities. In normal circumstances it can be visited on working days for a small charge. Further restoration work was undertaken in 1988 and a small project of wall repairs and roof truss stabilisation for around 100,000 euro in 2016.

== Status ==
Tailors' Hall is a registered National Monument and heritage site and, in its restored form, won the Europa Nostra Award in 1988. It is the oldest surviving guildhall in Dublin, the other example being the remnants of the Merchants' Hall by the Ha'penny Bridge, which dates from much later, c. 1821.

=== Gallery ===
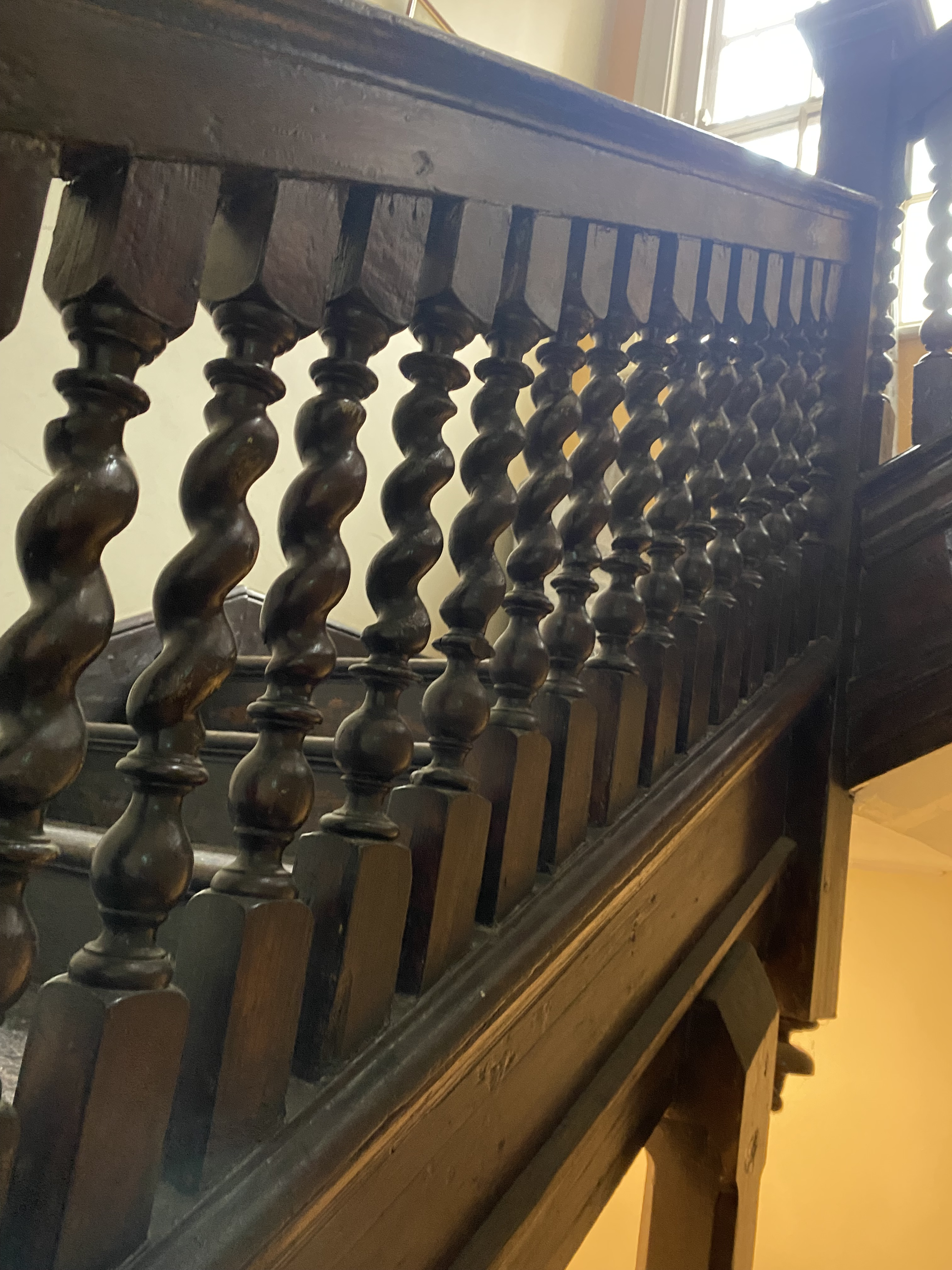
Barley twist bannisters

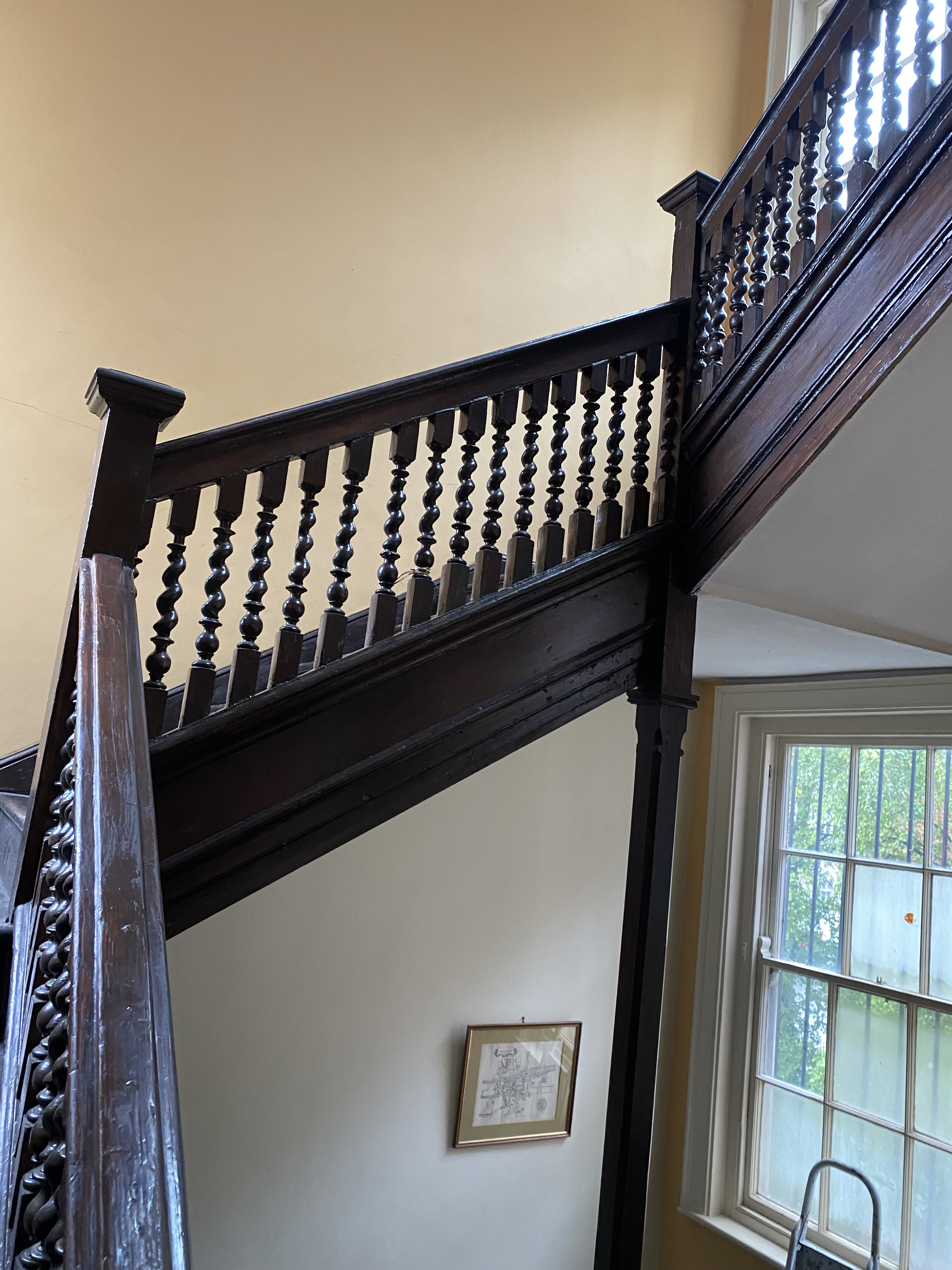
Staircase

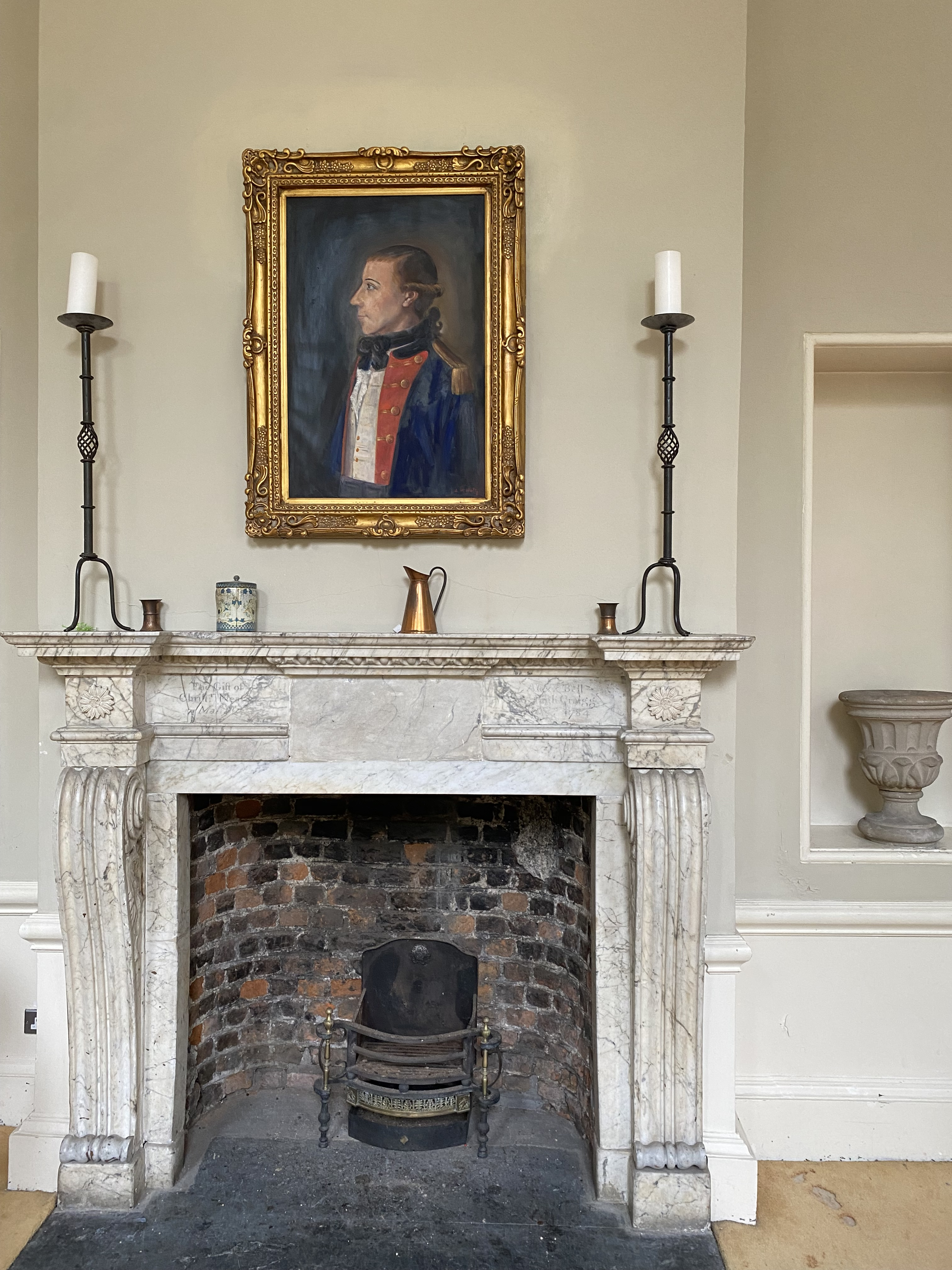
18th century marble fireplace in the great hall

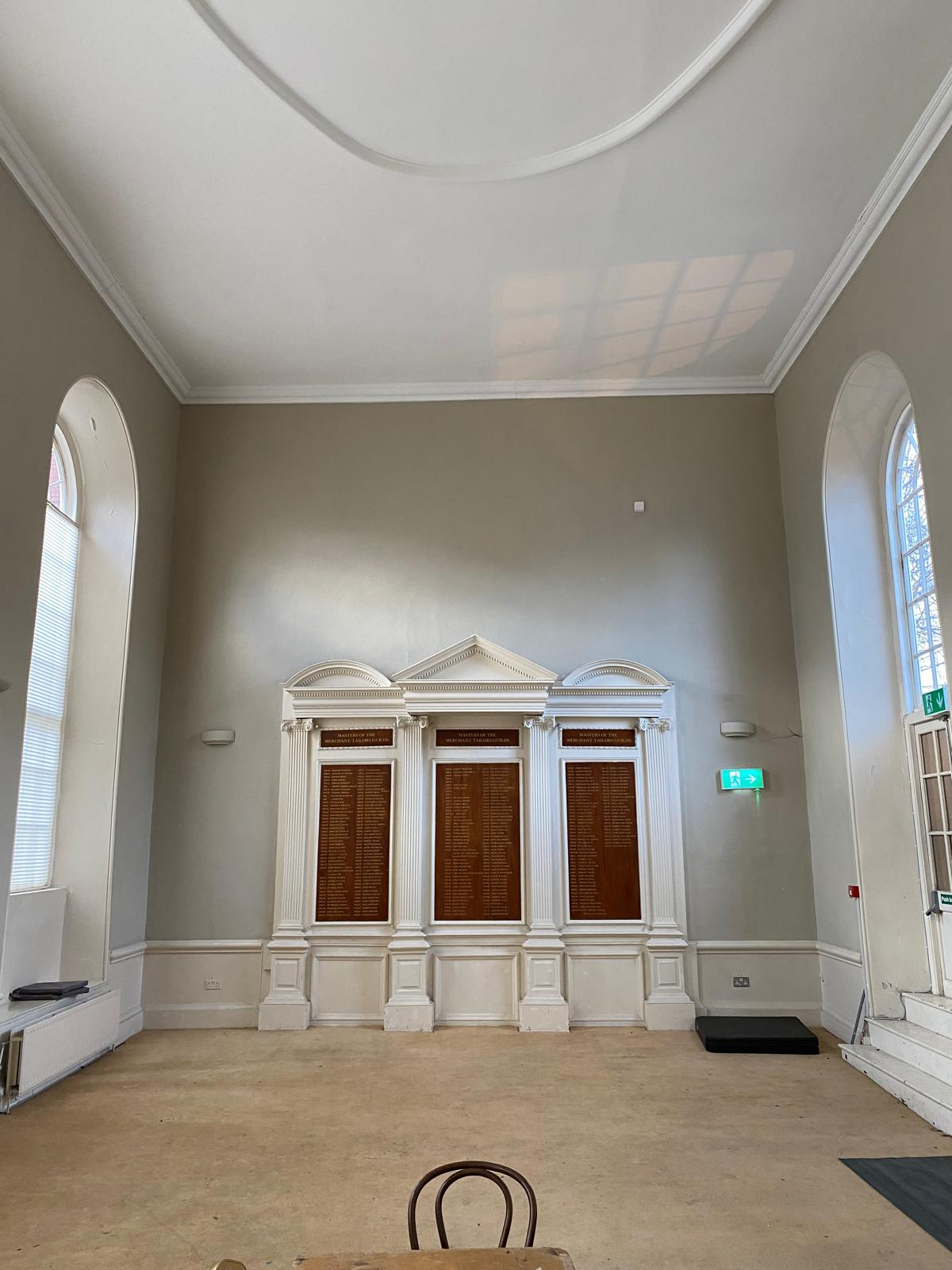
The great hall

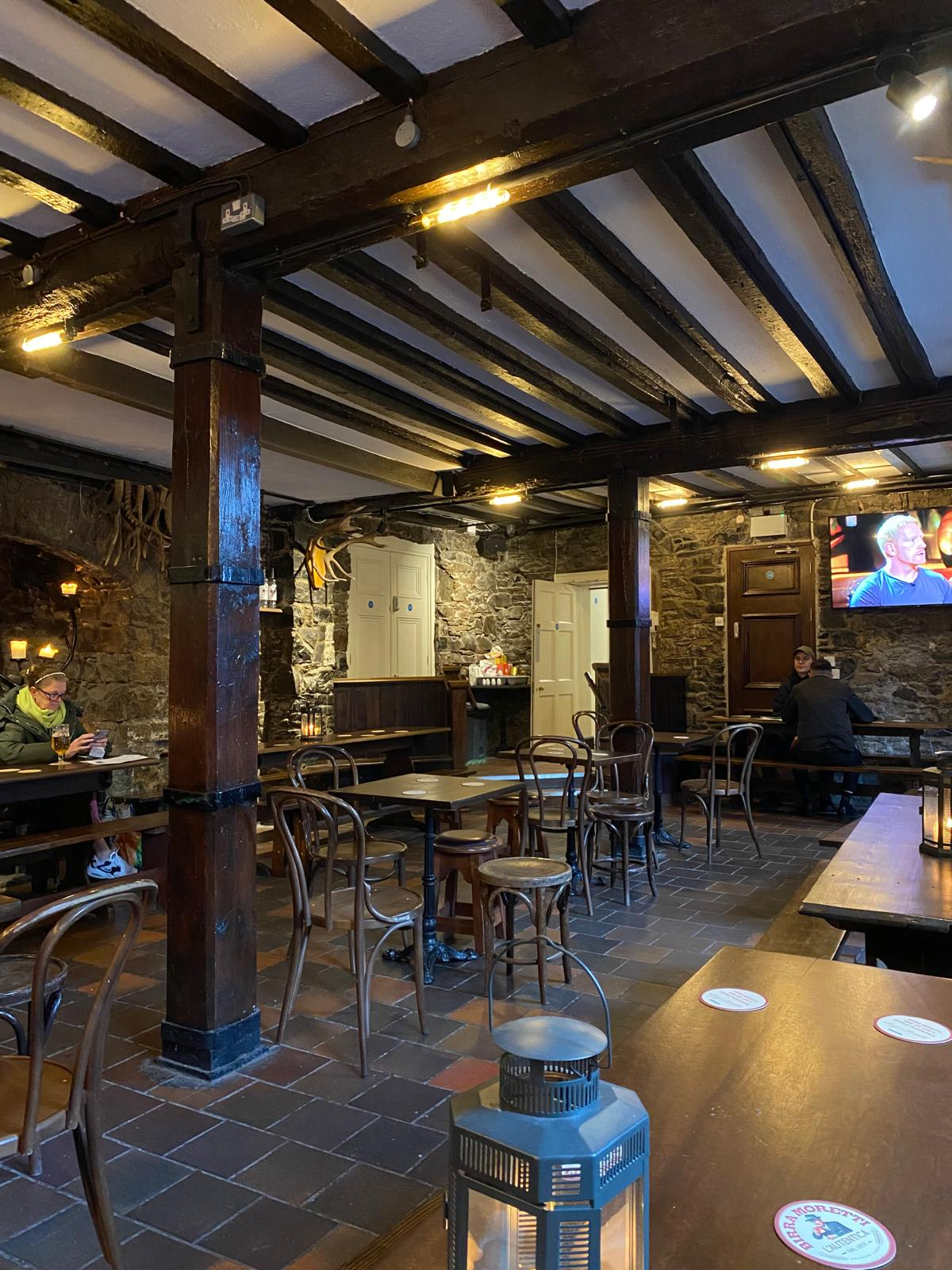
The basement of the Tailors' Hall

== See also ==
- Merchants' Hall
- Merchant Taylors' Hall, London
- Weavers' Hall, Dublin
