= Society of Artists in Ireland =

18th century arts organisation in Dublin, Ireland

- Formation: 1764
- Founders: Richard Cranfield and Simon Vierpyl
- Dissolved: 1780
- Type: Cultural institution
- Purpose: Promotion and exhibition of fine arts in Ireland
- Headquarters: The Exhibition Rooms, 58 South William Street, Dublin (1766-80)
- Location: Dublin, Ireland

The Society of Artists in Ireland was an artists group and guild formed for the purposes of holding exhibitions which was founded in Dublin in 1764 by Richard Cranfield and Simon Vierpyl along with ten other founding members including Thomas Roberts, Hugh Douglas Hamilton, William Ashford, Robert Hunter, Robert Carver, Robert Healy and Jonathan Fisher.

The organisation was effectively dissolved in 1780 with no further formal exhibitions taking place in Dublin for a period of 20 years.

== History ==
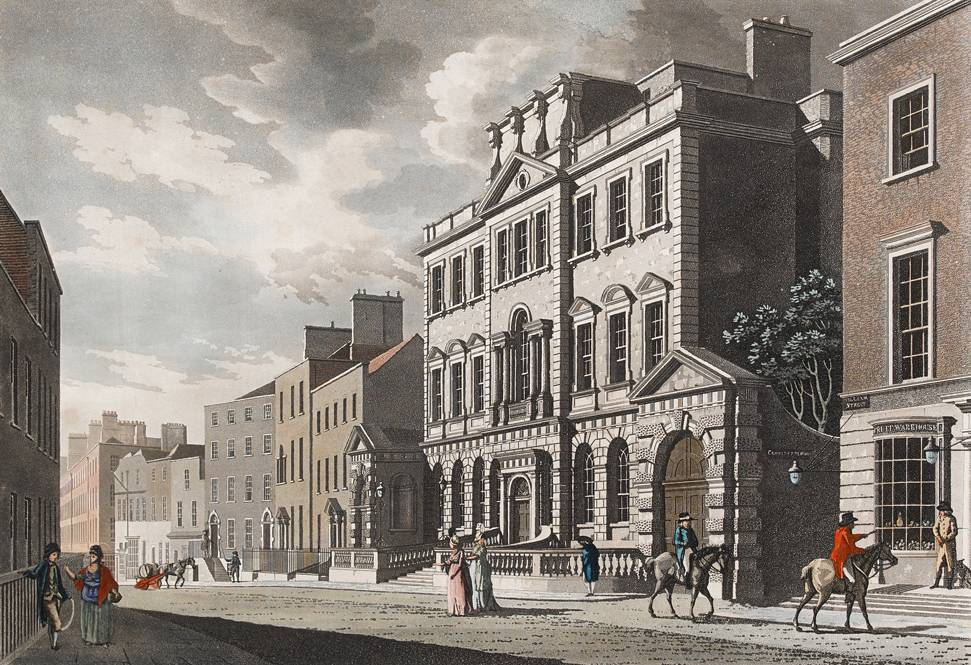
The Exhibition Rooms (right) from c1791 in one of James Malton's views of Dublin situated beside Powerscourt House (centre).

A few years earlier in 1761 the Society of Artists of Great Britain had also been founded in London and its leaders had encouraged the formation of the Irish society. Influenced by their comments, as well as the London-based society's success, the founding members decided to start their own society.

Around the same time, the Dublin Society had also tried to establish its own exhibition at Shaw's Court, Dame Street in February 1764 but the initiative failed.

The first exhibition was held at Charles Napper's Great Room on George's Lane on the 12th of February 1765 with 85 works exhibited. By the time of this exhibition, the membership had increased to include 27 of the most prominent artists of the day including 21 painters, 4 sculptors and 2 architects.

The exhibition was so successful that the society decided to build a dedicated exhibition space and gallery from 1764 to 1771 which was later to go on to become the seat of the City Assembly as City Assembly House from 1810. Today it is the headquarters of the Irish Georgian Society. The first exhibition to be held at the gallery was in March 1766.

After 1780, it has been said no formal exhibition of art was held in Dublin for 20 years.

=== The Society of the Artists of Ireland (1800) ===
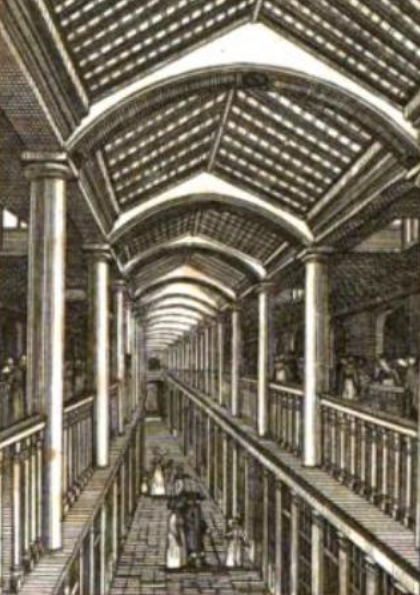
Home's Royal Arcade, College Green, where the first exhibition of the Royal Hibernian Academy was held in 1821.

In 1800 a new organisation was formed and named The Society of the Artists of Ireland under the patronage of the Lord Lieutenant Charles Lennox, 4th Duke of Richmond. Exhibitions were held at Allen's printsellers at 32 Dame Street in 1800, in 1801 and 1802 in the former House of Lords chamber of Parliament House, in 1804 back at Allen's on Dame Street and later on from 1809 to 1811 at the Dublin Society's headquarters on Hawkins Street.

In 1812 the group split into the seceders 'Irish Society of Artists for the agitating mostly more junior members who wished for more control and The Society of Artists of the City of Dublin.

These two organisations re-amalgamated in 1814 under the title of The Hibernian Society of Artists.

In 1815, another division took place with the senior members calling themselves The Artists of Ireland while other members continued under the name The Hibernian Society.

Between 1816 and 1819, various coalitions of artists exhibited under no formal body's administration other than the Royal Dublin Society as the host of the exhibitions at its Hawkins Street premises. Upon the RDS moving to Leinster House in 1819, and selling its former premises, the artists were left stranded without an exhibition space and held their last exhibition in 1819.

=== Royal Hibernian Academy ===
In 1821, prior to any new organisation being granted a charter, a successful exhibition had been held at Home's Royal Arcade at College Green. On 5 August 1823, the various groups were finally brought together as the Royal Hibernian Academy incorporating all individuals by royal charter.

== See also ==
- Royal Irish Institution
