= Lillias Mitchell =

Irish artist and teacher

- Born: Helen Lillias Mitchell; 1915; Rathgar, Dublin
- Died: 10 January 2000 (aged 84–85); Dublin, Ireland
- Education: National College of Art and Design; Royal Hibernian Academy

Helen Lillias Mitchell MRDS MRHA (1915 – 10 January 2000) was an Irish craft artist and teacher. She was the founder of The Irish Guild of Weavers, Spinners, and Dyers and the Weaving Department of National College of Art and Design.

== Early life and education ==
Helen Lillias Mitchell was born in Rathgar in 1915. She was the youngest child of David W. Mitchell and Frances Kirby Mitchell and showed a talent for art from an early age, attending painting classes with Elizabeth Yeats first, and later with Lilian Davidson. With the encouragement of Davidson, Mitchell studied at the Royal Hibernian Academy School under Dermod O'Brien, going on to study sculpture at the National College of Art and Design. From 1937 to 1938, she lived in Switzerland, studying sculpture and clay modelling.

== Artistic career ==
Mitchell won second place in the RDS Taylor Art Award in 1940, for her statue St Patrick Struggling in his Soul for Peace. After World War II she opened a weaving workshop at 84 Lower Mount Street, Dublin, where she developed her Golden Fleece emblem. She regularly attended Carl Malmsten's craft school at Viggbyholm, Sweden from 1949 onwards, studying traditional techniques of weaving and spinning. Numerous students attended Mitchell's weaving workshop, which led to her being appointed to establish a Weaving Department at the National College of Art and Design in 1951. From here, she taught spinning, weaving and dyeing up until her retirement. Mitchell had a particular interest in craft weaving using natural fibres and dyes. She studied with traditional spinners, dyers and weavers in County Kerry, County Donegal and Connemara.

Mitchell founded The Irish Guild of Weavers, Spinners, and Dyers in 1975.

She was an active member of Royal Dublin Society, particularly the Society's Arts and Crafts programmes. She established the Lillias Mitchell Award in 1987, an annual award as part of the RDS National Crafts Competition in the Textiles category. She was awarded an Honorary Life Membership of the RDS in 1993.

Mitchell continued to paint and sketch into her 80s, regularly exhibiting with the Water Colour Society of Ireland. She was elected an Honorary Member of the Royal Hibernian Academy in 1995. She died on 10 January 2000.

== Publications ==
In 1978, she published her anthology Irish Spinning, Weaving and Dyeing, and in 1986 she published Irish Weaving: Discoveries and Personal Experiences.

== Influence and legacy ==
By bequest, she established The Golden Fleece Award which is an independent artistic prize fund. The Award was launched in 2001, and awards Irish artists working in woven textiles, spinning, dyeing, glassmaking, metalwork, ceramics, stonework or woodwork.
