= Weavers' Hall, Dublin =

Former guildhall in Dublin, Ireland

Weavers' Hall
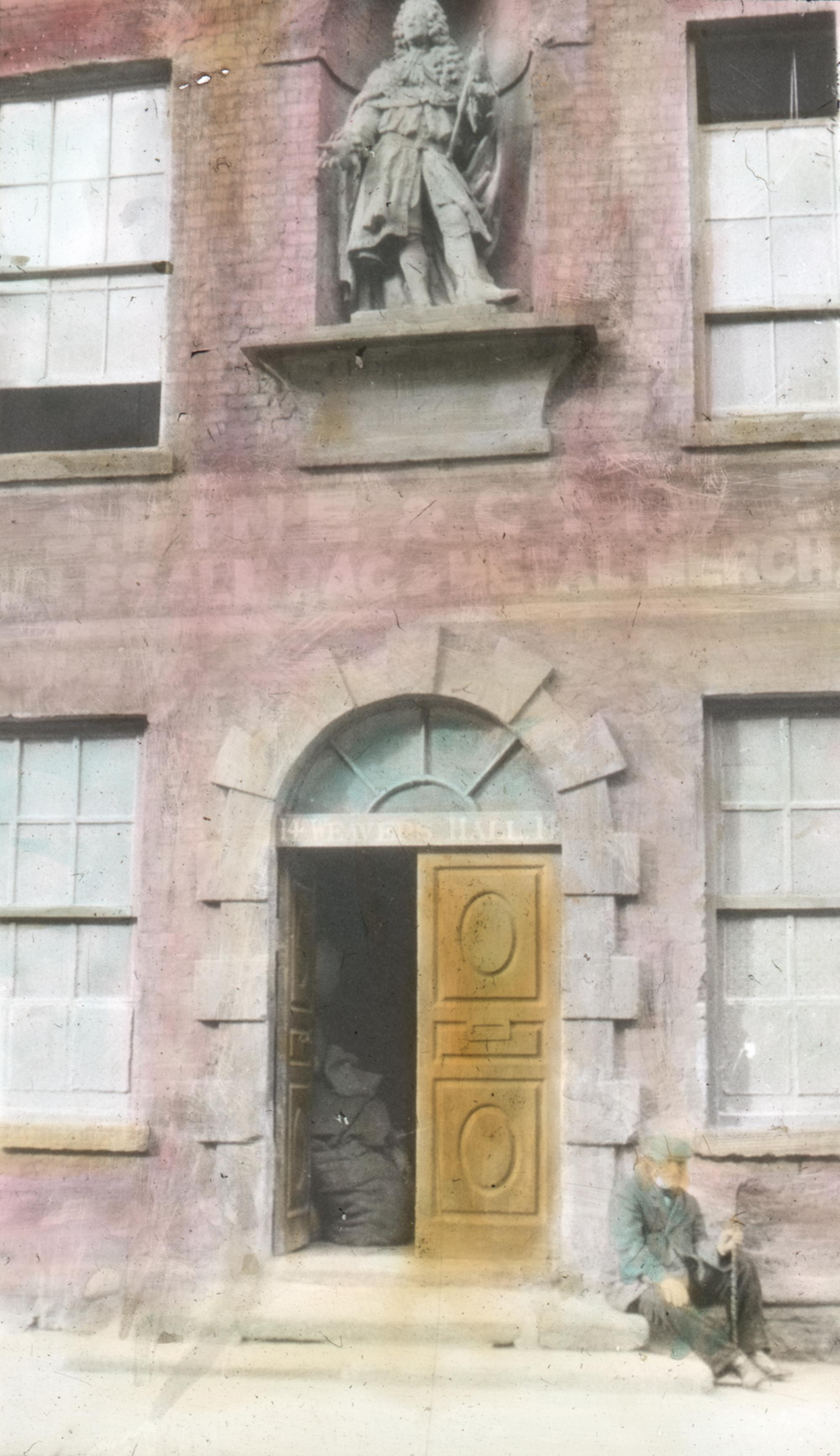
- A view of the front of Weavers' Hall in 1925

- Location within Central Dublin

General information
- Type: guildhall
- Architectural style: Georgian
- Location: 14 The Coombe, Dublin 8, Dublin, Ireland
- Coordinates: 53.33948°N 6.27457°W
- Groundbreaking: June 1745
- Completed: 1745
- Demolished: 1965
- Cost: £200 from David Digges La Touche was provided for the construction, £80 was used to acquire the leasehold of the cleared site
- Affiliation: Guild of Weavers

Technical details
- Material: Red brick and granite
- Floor count: 2

Design and construction
- Architect: Joseph Jarratt
- Developer: David Digges La Touche

Weavers' Hall was a guildhall at 14 The Coombe, Dublin, Ireland, which housed the Guild of Weavers (sometimes called the Guild of St Philip and St James or the Guild of the Blessed Virgin Mary), one of the 25 Guilds of the City of Dublin. The building was constructed in 1745 to a design by architect Joseph Jarratt to replace an earlier nearby weavers' guildhall in the Lower Coombe which was built in 1681–2 and was located in what was originally the Earl of Meath's Liberty. The building was demolished in 1965, with elements including furniture, fireplaces, door surrounds and stone floors sold off as scrap.

== History ==
The Weaver's Guild was first established on the 28th of September 1446 and was made up of a master, two wardens and a brethren. The first dedicated weavers' guildhall is recorded as only being built in 1681.

=== Construction ===
A committee was established in 1738 to arrange for the building of a new weavers' hall. They were empowered in 1740 to purchase the interest in a lease of some houses in the Lower Coombe for £80. David Digges LaTouche, Master of the Guild, put forward £200 for the construction of the hall. The hall was under construction at the time of his death on the 17th of October 1745 so he never got to see the final fruits of his donation. The architect is believed to have been Joseph Jarratt who likely also designed LaTouche's townhouse and bank in a similar restrained red-brick and granite Georgian style and which was constructed on Castle Street some time in the 1730s opposite Newcomen Bank.

The interior of the hall was wainscotted to pedestal height in the fashion of the time and the main hall was recorded as being fifty-six feet long by twenty-one feet wide.

The adjacent building was no. 13 Weavers Alms House, the Alms House being initially established in 1767. The guild also maintained a charitable school at number 17 the Coombe in an adjacent building but owing to financial difficulties at certain times had to cease the operations of the school and let the building to generate income.

=== Later years ===
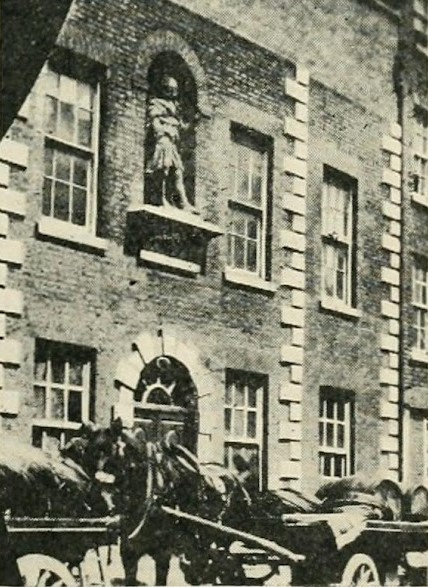
The hall, before 1898

The hall is noted as being little used by 1825, after the guilds had largely ceased to function, and acted as a meeting hall for Methodists at that time. It is likely that the guild went into gradual decline with the downturn which followed the Act of the Union and fluctuating prices of woven materials while the cessation of the guild lead to the building being in a near derelict state. At some stage in the 19th century the pediment was removed and with it the coat of arms detailed upon it and the original inscription which read "MDCCXLV JAMES DIGGES LATOUCHE - MASTER, FRANCIS GLADWELL, THOMAS ANDREWS - WARDENS".

By 1898 the building was used as a store by an ironmonger. It was demolished in 1965, with elements including furniture, fireplaces, door surrounds and stone floors sold off as scrap.

== Statuary and interior ==
The building housed numerous notable pieces of art, tapestries and statues during its lifetime.

=== George II - statue ===
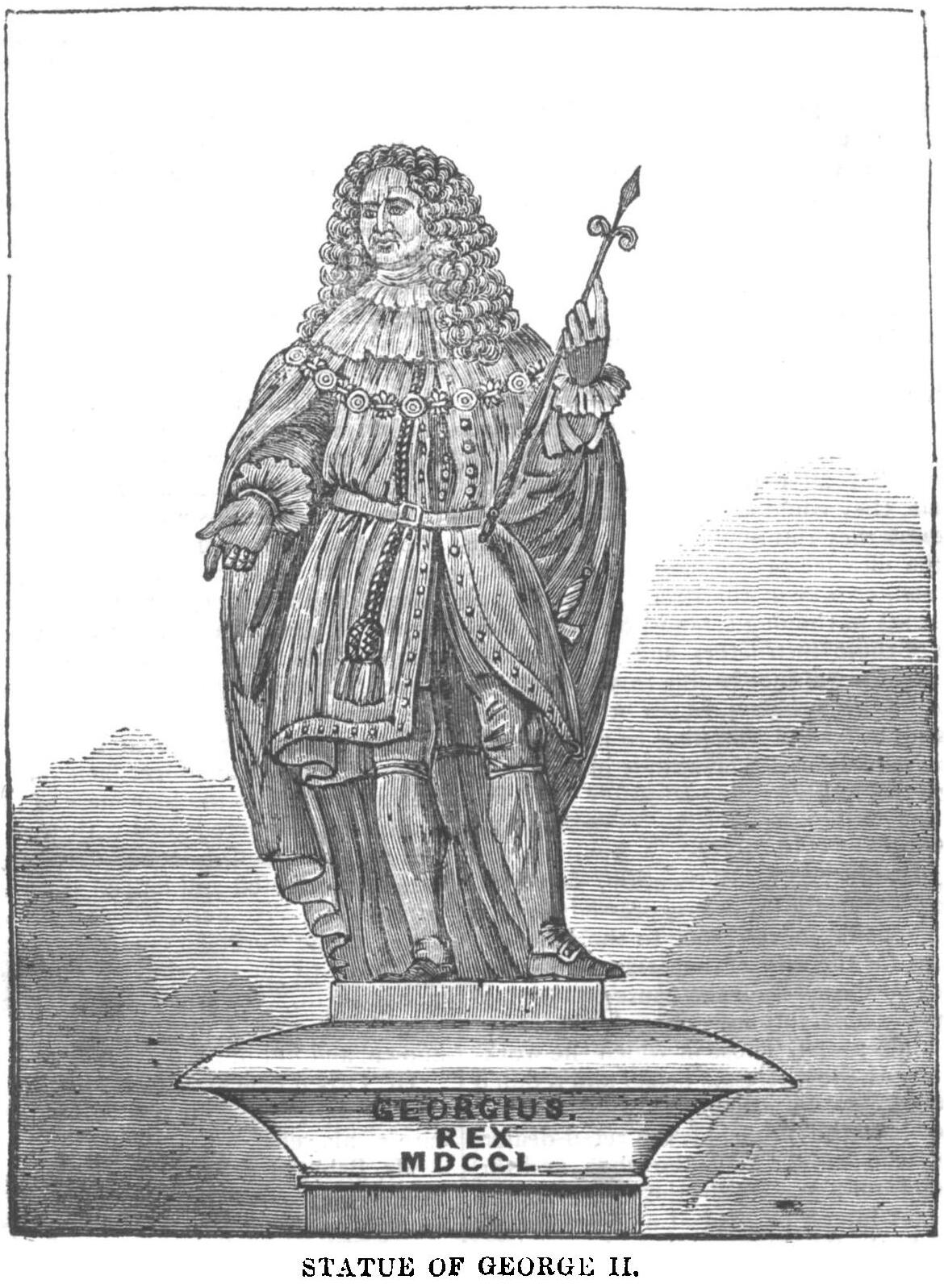
Statue of George II, Dublin Penny Journal 1835

A leaden statue of George II by John van Nost the younger (later some experts have suggested it may be by Benjamin Rackstrow) was located on the second floor in an arched niche in the front façade of the building with an inscription on the supported plinth below reading "Georgius Rex MDCCL". It was originally unveiled on the anniversary of the Battle of the Boyne on the 1st of July 1750 and was finely gilted and ornamented with intricately carved weavers' tools but over time lost its luster and was finally removed on the 16th of November 1937. The statue was taken down by the owners of the premises at the time, Messrs S. Fine and Company Limited, a furnishing company, who feared it may be blown up. Some of the remains of the statue can still be found in Dublin today after it was hacked apart and sold as scrap. Currently the head is located in the Dublin Civic Museum collection.

=== George II - tapestry ===
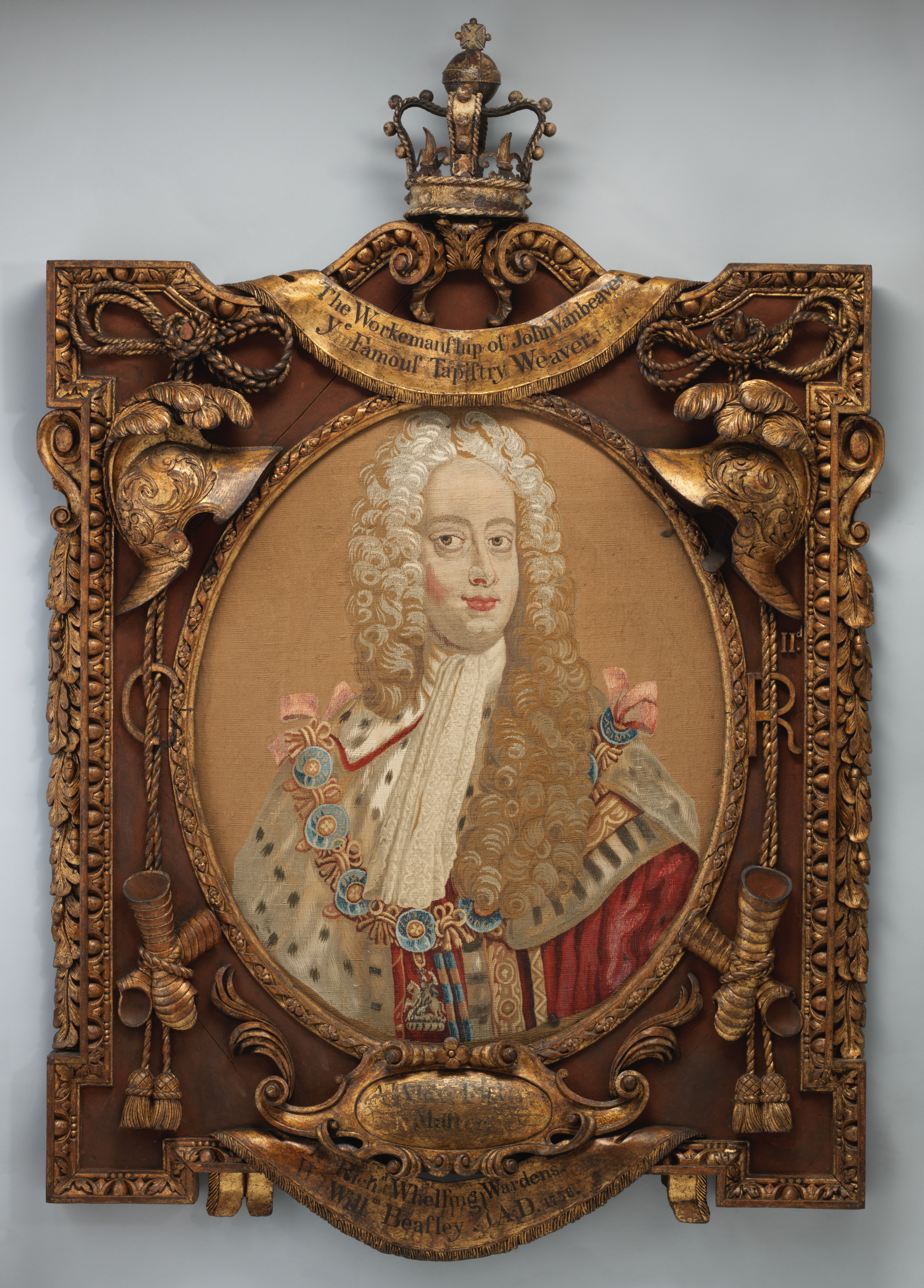
King George II tapestry

A famous tapestry made in 1738 by John Van Beaver of George II hung over the fireplace in the main hall and now hangs in the Metropolitan Museum of Art in New York. The elaborately carved oak frame of the tapestry was originally inscribed with the short rhyme 'The workmanship of John Vanbeaver, Ye famous tapestry (sic) weaver'. The tapestry was later purchased by Richard Atkinson, twice Lord Mayor of Dublin to adorn his poplin warehouse premises at 31 College Green. At one stage Atkinson also used the top floor of the hall as a weaving room for his manufactures as well as for a period using Merchants' Hall. The bottom of the frame has inscribed the name of the guilds master, Alex. Riky, and wardens, Richard Whelling and William Beasley in 1738.

=== David Digges LaTouche - marble bust ===
A marble bust of LaTouche by John van Nost the younger stood in his honour in the building and is now owned by the Huntington Library in California.

=== External links ===
- RSAI
- Dublin City Council
- RTE Stills Archive
- South Dublin County Council
- Oregon State University (see main image)
- Map showing precise location of Weavers' Hall

== See also ==
- Tailors' Hall
- Merchants' Hall
- Irish Guild of Weavers, Spinners, and Dyers - the modern version of the trade body established in 1975.
- St. Luke's Church, Dublin
