= Guilds of the City of Dublin =

List of ancient Guilds in the City of Dublin, Ireland

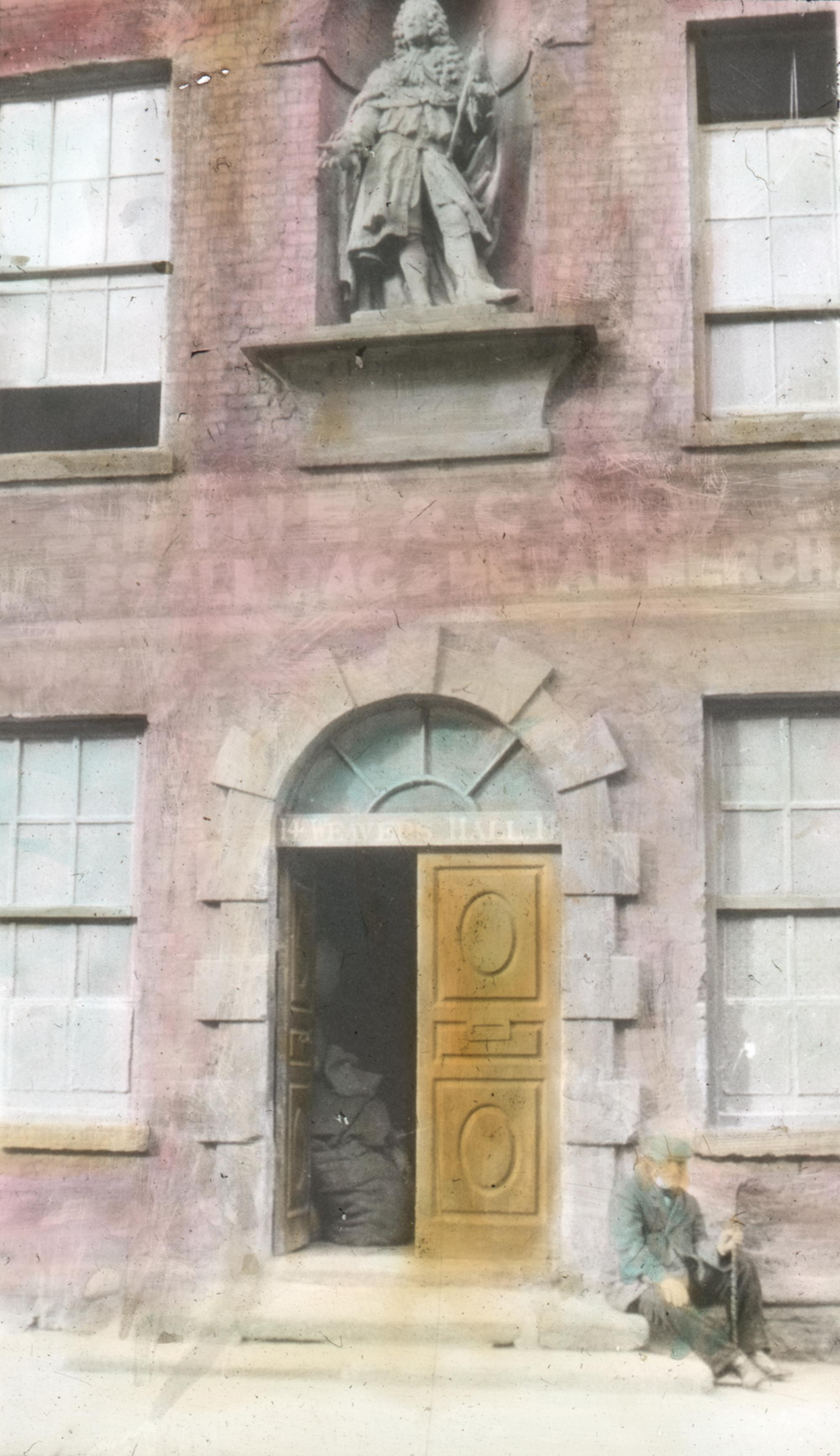
Lantern slide of Weaver's Hall featuring a statue of George II

The Guilds of the City of Dublin were associations of trade and craft practitioners, with regulatory, mutual benefit and shared religious purposes. In their eventual number they were sometimes called the "25 minor corporations", in contrast to the city's principal authority, the Dublin Corporation). They operated in various forms from near the time of the Norman invasion of Ireland until the mid-19th century, and a few of which have descendent operations to the present day.

The guild system in Ireland was first established under a royal charter from Prince John in 1192 where Dublin was granted the liberty "of having all reasonable guilds, as the burgesses of Bristol has". The guild system largely ceased between 1840 and 1845, but subsequently some guilds developed residual activities.

The Guilds elected 96 of the up to 144 members of the Common Council, the lower house of the City Assembly, the governing body of Dublin Corporation, with 31 seats controlled by the Merchants Guild, and each of the others electing 2, 3 or 4 Common Councillors. The remainder of the Common Council consisted of up to 48 Sheriffs' Peers, former holders of the office of Sheriff of Dublin City, while the upper house of the Assembly was the Board of Aldermen, with 24 aldermen, the Lord Mayor of Dublin, elected from a slate of nominated aldermen, and two Sheriffs, who had to have a certain level of property value.

== List of Guilds of the City of Dublin ==
Order (Note: of Precedence in Common Council and on the procession of Riding the Franchises)	Name	Other name(s)	Meeting place / Hall	Date established	Date of cessation	Common Council seats	Notes
1	Merchants	Holy Trinity Guild	Merchants' Hall, Wellington Quay	1190 (reputedly, first explicit charters mentioned re. 1451 and 1438)		31	See Dublin Guild Merchant
2	Tailors	Guild of St John the Baptist	Tailors' Hall, Back Lane	1207 (reputedly, first formal charters known 1418, 1419)		4	Claimed precedence of all guilds, but then ceded first place to the Merchants, and remained second in precedence thereafter. Tailors' Hall was used by many other guilds over time (as was Carpenters' Hall). By the 19th century, possessed multiple properties on Back Lane, a mill and other plots in central Dublin, the area of Baskin in north Dublin, and multiple properties near Wicklow town. Assets transferred to Trust in 1841, school formed, moved to Merchants' Arch 1873, then to Molesworth St.; Trust subsists.
3	Smiths	Guild of St Loy	Used Merchants' Hall, Tailors' Hall and Carpenters' Hall at Audeon's arch; previously Gormond's Gate	1474 (earliest known charter)	1841 (dissolution)	4	Third in precedence from early times. As of 1688, included ironmongers and girdlers, and by the 19th century also included glaziers, pewterers, braziers, founders, tinplate workers, pattern makers, wire-drawers and workers, embroiderers and trunk makers.
4	Barbers (& Surgeons, Apothecaries and Periwigmakers)	Guild of St Mary Magdalen	Used Tailors' Hall, (previously based at the Pole Gate (tower, Werburgh St.), a hall on Smock Alley and various pubs)	1446 (1577) (1687) (Charters, as Guild of Barbers, later Barber-Chirurgians or Barber-Surgeons, or at one point "of Barbers, of Chirurgeons, of Apothecaries and of Periwig-Makers")		4 (reduced to 2 when Apothecaries seceded in 1747)	Chartered 15 years before the equivalent London guild. Second charter granted 1577, which formally took in surgeons, though they had been joining the guild for many years already. Similarly, a new charter in 1687 specifically included the apothecary and wig-maker trades, acknowledging that both were already members. Apothecaries seceded in 1747 when the Guild of St Luke was established subsequent to a Charter of 1745. Many guild roles taken over by the Royal College of Surgeons in Ireland (seceded in 1784).
5	Bakers	Guild of St Anne and St Clement	Used Carpenters' Hall at Audeon's arch, Bakers' Tower on Wood Quay, Bakers' Hall near St Audeon's	1478 (first known charter; banners showed 1483)		4	See Saint Anne's Guild. Additionally various "Bakers' Societies" operated over time - including the Boot Lane, Little Britain St., New Lane West, Werburgh Street and other Bakers', or Operative Bakers' Societies.
6	Butchers	Guild of the Virgin Mary	Used Tailors' Hall	1684		3	
7	Carpenters, Millers, Masons and Tylers	Guild of the Fraternity of the Blessed Virgin Mary of the house of St Thomas the Martyr	Carpenters' Hall at Audeon's arch	1508 (Charter, 23 Henry VII)		3	The hall at Audeon's Arch was the headquarters of the Carpenters' Guild, who then allowed other guilds to use it. As of the 1830s, there was a ruinous hall on St Andrew's Lane, and some plots on Thomas St.
8	Shoemakers	Guild of the Blessed Virgin Mary	Used Carpenters' Hall at Audeon's arch	1465 (Charter, 5 Edward IV)		4	Held two houses on each of High Street and Castle Street to provide rental income
9	Saddlers, Upholders, Coach and Coach-harness makers	Guild of the Blessed Virgin Mary	Used Tailors' Hall	1588 (Charter, 1677: 29 Charles II)		3	
10	Cooks and Vintners	Guild of St James the Apostle	Originally Cooks' Hall on Cook Street	1444 (Charter, 22 Henry VI)	1841	2	The Cooks' Guild operated out of a hall on Cook Street until 1782. They later moved to the Eagle Tavern on Eustace Street from 1816 to 1841, before having a listed address at 1 Dawson Street (Morrison's Hotel) until the last meeting was held in 1841.
11	Tanners	Guild of St Nicholas	Used Tailors' Hall	1688 (Charter, 4 James II)		2	Also known as the Guild of the Arts and Mysteries of Tanners
12	Tallow-chandlers	Guild of St George	Used Carpenters' Hall at Audeon's arch	1583 (Charter: 1674)		2	Also known as the Guild of Tallow-chandlers, Soap-boilers and Wax-light makers
13	Glovers and Skinners	Guild of the Blessed Virgin Mary	Hoey's Court and used Tailors' Hall	1476 (Charter, 16 Edward IV)		2	
14	Weavers	Guild of St Philip and James (at least two charters: Guild of the Blessed Virgin Mary)	Weavers' Hall, Coombe (built 1681–1682, new Hall nearby started 1745)	1446(Charter, 25 Henry VI)	1840	3	Jurisdiction in city and within 6 miles of its precincts. Reconstituted 1688. Combers added as a wing, 1697. Also known as the Corporation of the Arts and Mysteries of Weavers. Guild ceased in 1840. The much altered Weavers' Hall in the Coombe area, and two adjacent houses, were finally demolished only in 1956.
15	Sheermen and Dyers	Guild of St Nicholas	Used Tailors' Hall	1660		2	
16	Goldsmiths	Guild of All Saints	Werburgh Street (1709); 22 Golden Lane (1812)	1637(Charter, 13 Charles I)	Successor office still in operation	4	Existed in some form in the 15th century but formally incorporated when issued with royal charter by Charles I, 22 December 1637. The guild successor, The Company of Goldsmiths, continues to exist and runs the Dublin Assay Office.
17	Cooper	Guild of St Patrick near Dublin	93 Abbey Street	1666 (Charter, 18 Charles II)	1983		Received its royal charter from Charles II in 1666. The guild survived until 1983 when its remaining members voted it out of existence. See also Amalgamated Society of Coopers. For a period they met at Homes Hotel on Usher's Quay.
18	Felt-makers		Used Carpenters' Hall at Audeon's-arch	1667 (Charter, 19 Charles II)		2	
19	Cutlers, Painters, Paper Stainers and Stationers	Guild of St Luke the Evangelist	Stationers' Hall on Skinners Row (demolished June 1762), later Capel Street	1670 (Charter, 22 Charles II)		3	The Dutch golden age painter Ludowyk Smits was a member from 1681 - 1688.
20	Bricklayers and Plasterers	Guild of St Bartholomew	Used Carpenters' Hall at Audeon's-arch	1670 (Charter, 22 Charles II)		2	Its successor body later operated from a dedicated hall at 49 Cuffe Street, Dublin 2 from the 1880s until it was demolished as part of a Dublin Corporation road widening scheme in 1985
21	Hosiers and Knitters	Guild of St George	Weaver's Hall	1688 (Charter, 4 James II)		2	
22	Curriers	Guild of St Nicholas	4 French Street (Mercer Street Upper)	1695 (Charter, 7 William III)			
23	Brewers and Maltsters	Guild of St Andrew	Hoey's Court and Morrison's Hotel, 1 Dawson Street	1696 (Charter, 8 William III)		4	
24	Joiners, Coylers and Wainscotters		Used Tailors' Hall, Back Lane	1700 (Charter, 12 William III)		2	
25	Apothecaries	Guild of St Luke	Guild of St Luke and Company of Apothecaries' Hall: Apothecaries' Hall, 40 Mary Street, later 95 Merrion Square, from 2011 at Royal College of Physicians of Ireland, Kildare Street.	(1446) (1577) (1687) 1745 (Charters) 1791 (Act of Parliament)	Successor body still in operation	2	Previously members of the Guild of Barbers, see above, but seceded in 1747 following incorporation of the Guild of St Luke by the Charter of 1745. See Apothecaries' Hall of Ireland. Company of Apothecaries' Hall incorporated by an Act of Parliament in 1791. Now hosted by the Royal College of Physicians of Ireland at their building on Kildare Street

== See also ==
- Guild
- Guildhall
- Livery company
- Brotherhood of Saint George - a short-lived Dublin military guild
