= The Tholsel, Dublin =

Historic public building in Dublin, Ireland

The Tholsel
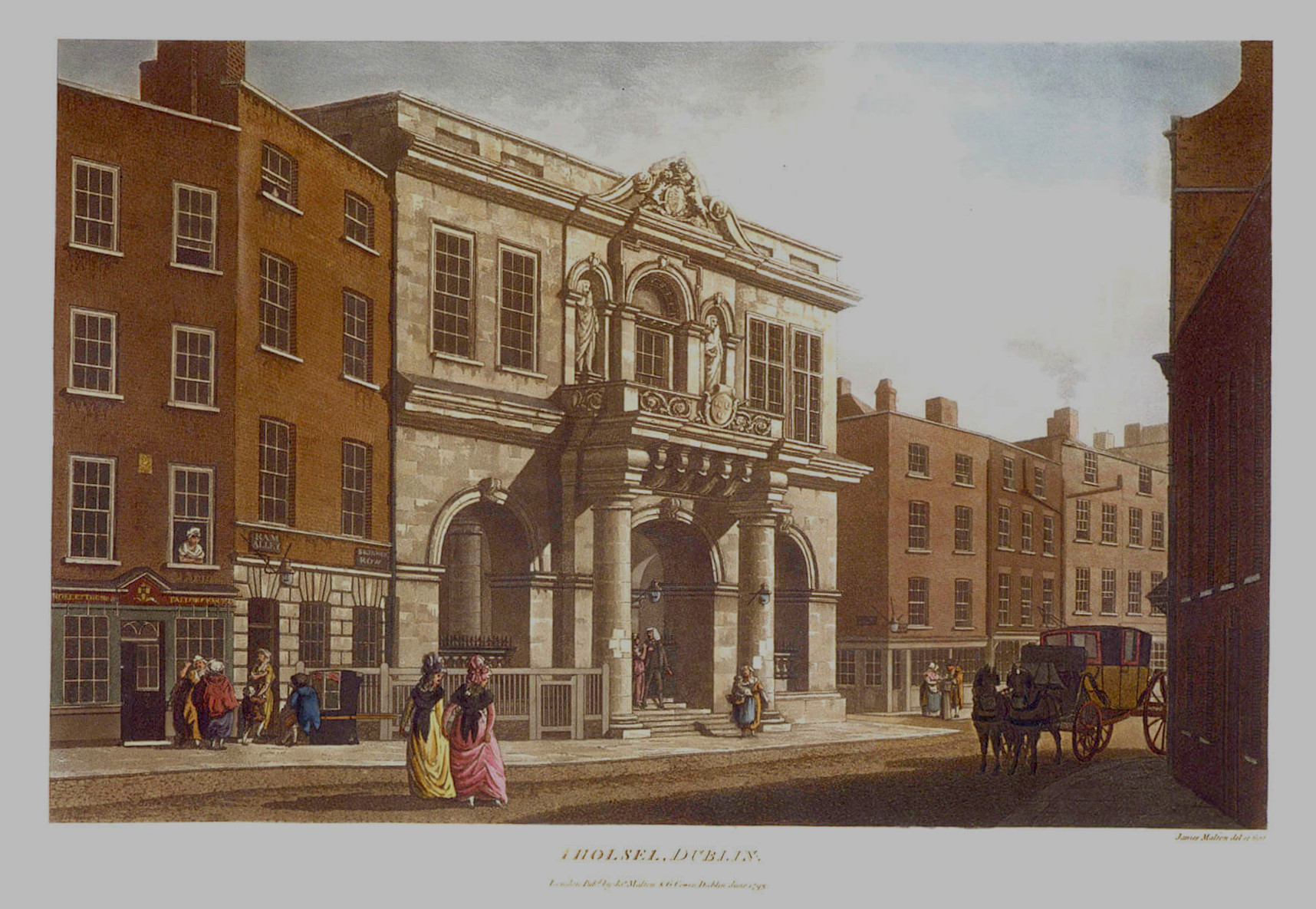
- An illustration of the tholsel in c.1790 by James Malton

General information
- Architectural style: Baroque, Classical
- Classification: Demolished
- Location: Skinner's Row; Dublin 2, Dublin, Ireland
- Coordinates: 53.342860°N 6.271182°W
- Completed: First version in 1200s "New tholsel" 1311; Re-built 1681
- Demolished: 1818
- Owner: Dublin Corporation

The Tholsel was an important building in Dublin, Ireland which combined the function of civic hall, guildhall, court house, gaol, meeting place of Dublin Corporation and even for a period (1641–1648) acted as Parliament House.

Its final iteration was located on Skinners Row within the old city walls of Dublin after having existed in various forms from after the Norman invasion of Ireland until the remaining portions were finally demolished sometime after 1818. It was one of the most important and imposing buildings in medieval Dublin. It was a secular and commercial focal point within the city walls situated at a major crossroads close to Dublin Castle, St Patrick's Cathedral and Christchurch Cathedral. It was one of several tholsels which were constructed in the major cities and towns of medieval Ireland and the Dublin tholsel also housed the first public clock in Ireland on its tower from 1466.

== History ==
=== Early history ===
There are mentions of the tholsel as far back as 1311 being called the 'new' tholsel, indicating that an earlier building had been constructed.

In 1343, the tholsel was again mentioned when there was a charter granted by Edward III which set an exemption from the portion of tolls due to the King so that the burghers of the city could repair the building.

In 1395, Gerardus Van Raes was appointed keeper of the Dublin Tholsel for life. He was granted the keep of both the upper and lower gaol in that tholsel, indicating an increasing number of prisoners. The upper keep was usually reserved for debtors while the lower keep was for felons and more serious criminals.

In 1590, Archbishop of Dublin Adam Loftus addressed the lord mayor and Corporation of Dublin at the tholsel and requested the use of the old Priory of All Hallows to establish a university. He was granted permission and two years later he established Trinity College Dublin on the site.

In 1597, the condition of the building, already weakened by a great cleft in the eastern flank, deteriorated under the force of the Dublin gunpowder explosion.

From 1641-48 the Parliament of Ireland met at the tholsel. The parliament was transferred here from the Castle because some of the parliamentarians were suspected to sympathise with the rebels and might try to seize the castle, which held important stores of weapons and munitions.

=== Reconstruction of 1681 ===
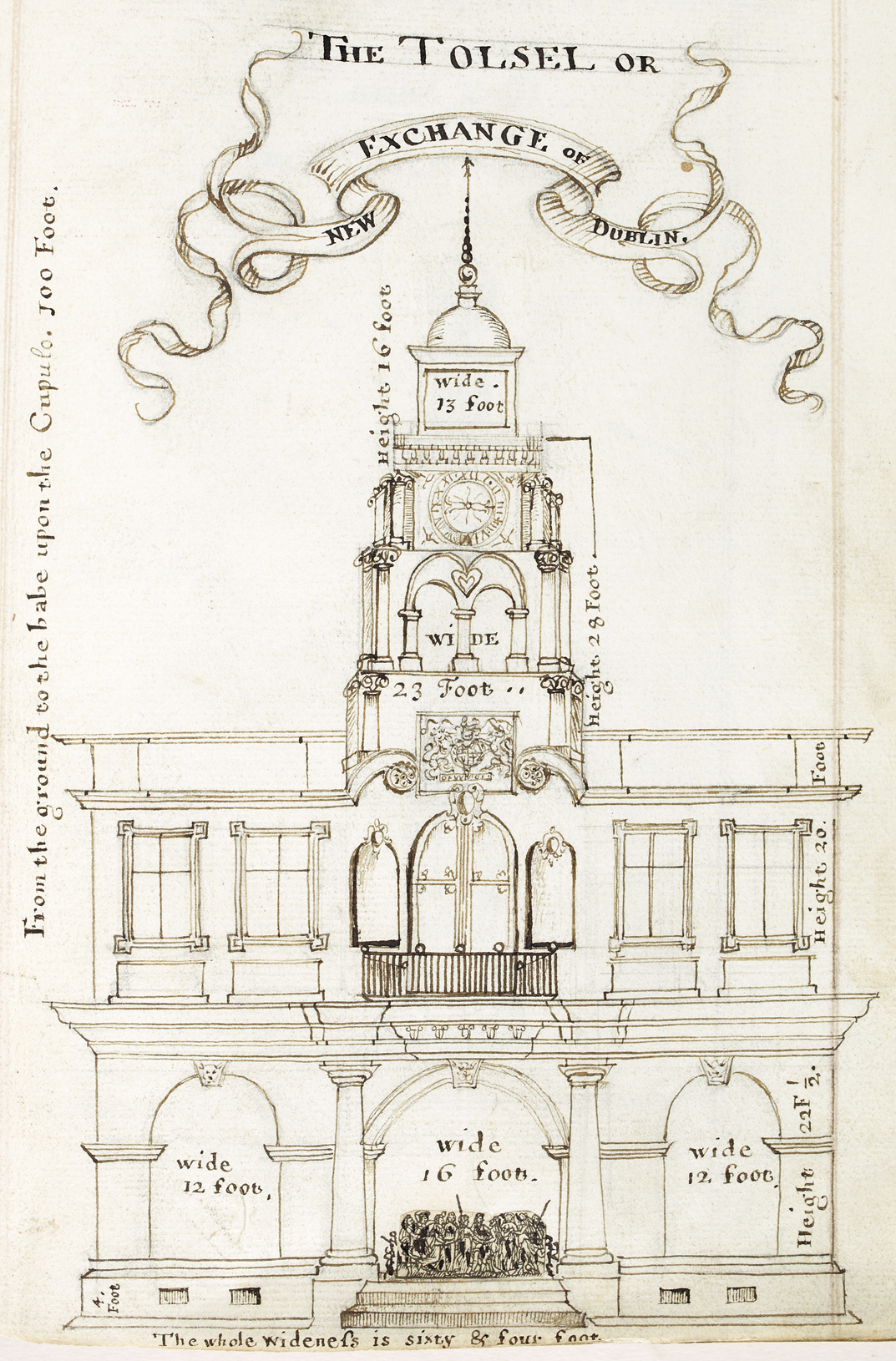
Sketch of the Dublin Tholsel by Thomas Dingley (1680-1)

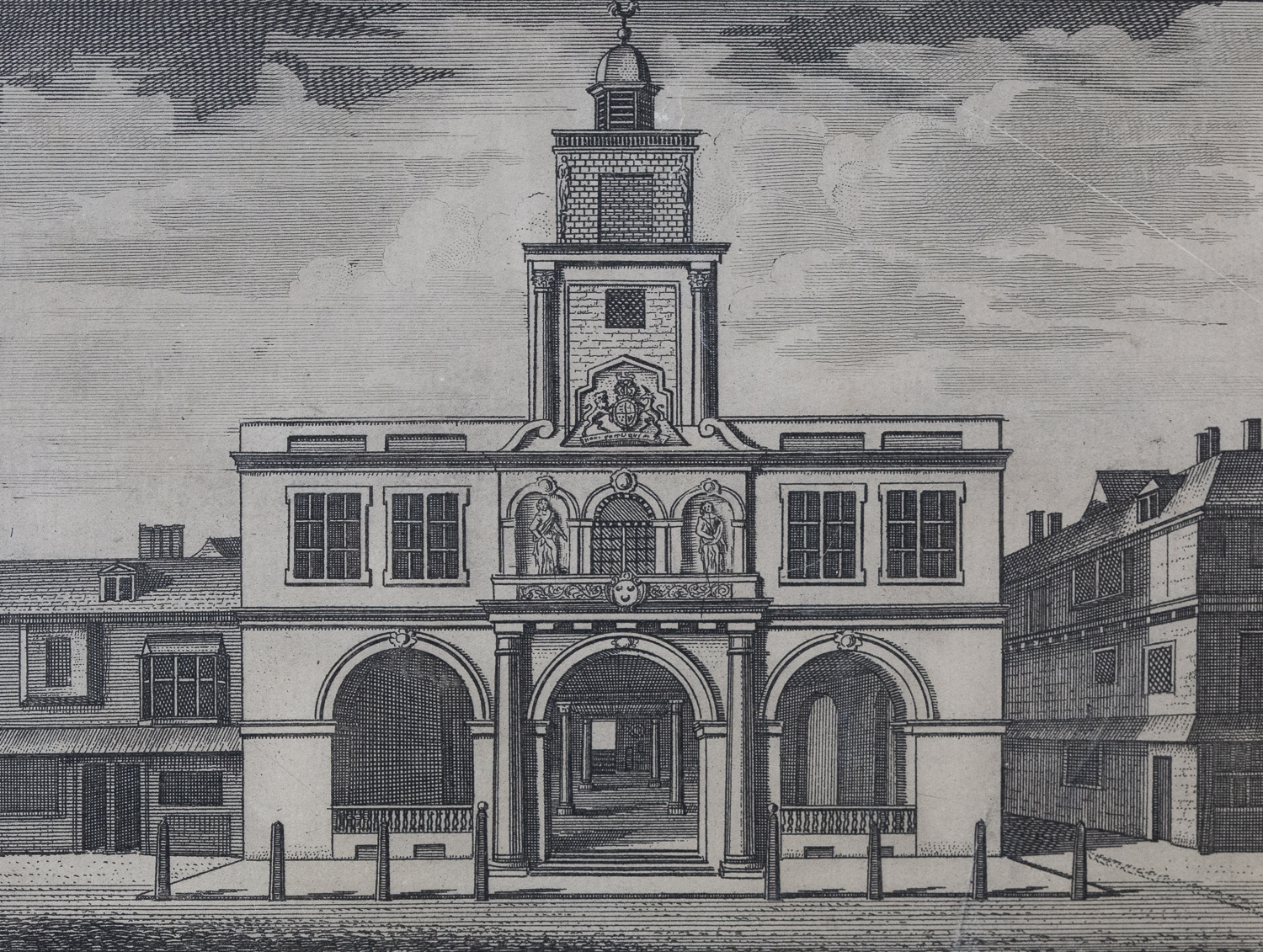
The Tholsel as it appeared in 1728.

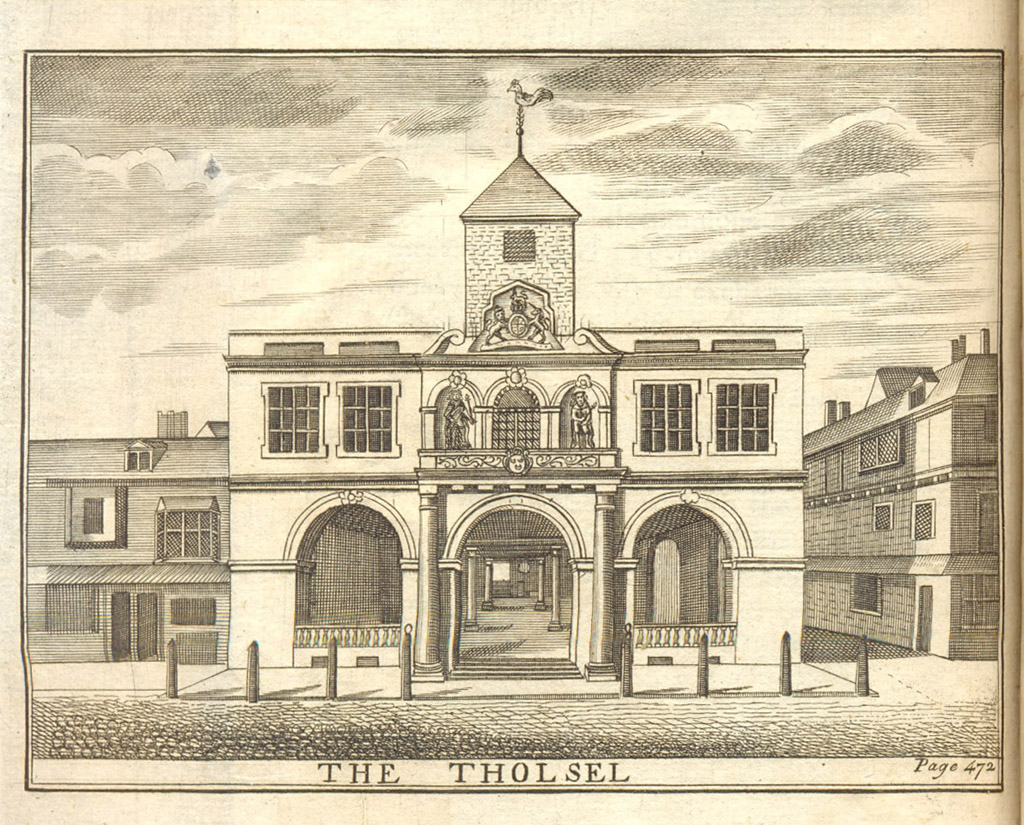
An engraving of the tholsel with tower and weathercock taken from an original in Charles Brooking's map of Dublin (1728). The tower was later amended for this illustration in 1766.

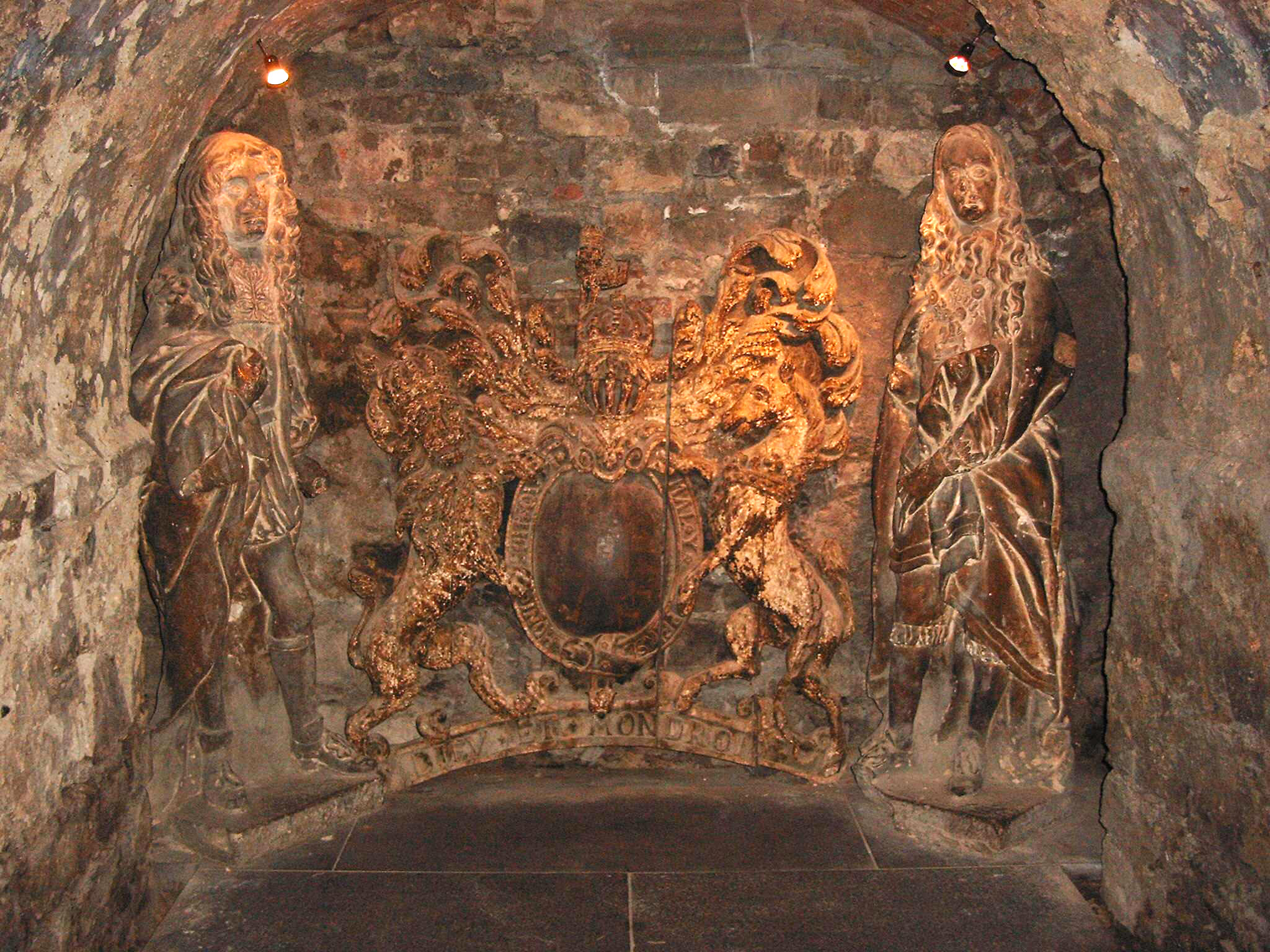
The coat or arms from the front of the Tholsel now stored in the crypt of Christchurch cathedral.

The last tholsel building was completed around 1681 and was finally occupied by Dublin Corporation and the Merchants' Guild in 1682. It is unknown who designed the building although various masons including a William Rothery are recorded as having worked on it at various stages. In 1683, the exchange of Dublin was transferred from Cork House to the tholsel.

In his study of Protestant Dublin in the seventeenth and eighteenth centuries, Robin Usher describes the building as roughly square in plan and abutted on one side by houses. The elevations consisted of an arcaded ground storey, open to the elements on the north and western sides with a fenestrated piano nobile above. The city assembly and the board of alderman met in richly ornamented rooms over the ground floor loggia, itself fitted out as the merchants’ exchange. Two statues sculpted by William De Keysar depicting King Charles II, and his brother, James Duke of York, along with the royal coat of arms faced the building to the front.

Among its more notable features include a swan-neck pediment, which could formerly be seen over the door of the Blue Coat School on Queen Street and can still be seen on St. Michan's Church.

The tholsel features as one of the most notable of the 25 illustrations in James Malton's A Picturesque and Descriptive View of the City of Dublin and is one of the few structures depicted which does not remain standing as of 2020. The building is shown facing directly onto Skinner's Row at the corner of Nicholas Street near the Church of St. Nicholas Within with an adjacent lane named Ram Alley running alongside as well as the property of Robert Thomas, Tallow Chandler at 1 Skinner's Row. Records indicate that this was historically accurate with the business of Robert Thomas in situ at the adjacent property around the time of Malton's illustration in 1791. The illustration shows the building without a tower, cupola or weather vane which had all been lost in the previous decades as the building gradually degraded and fell out of functional use.

Voting in the 1713 Irish general election took place at the Tholsel (then considered a Whig stronghold), rather than at the Blue Coat School, setting off a chain of events which led to the Dublin election riot.

In 1718, persons broke into the tholsel and slashed the painting of George I with knives.

Its ultimate demise came with the construction of the Royal Exchange and the migration of all major trade and mercantile operations to this more grand and spacious commercial building in 1769.

Various plans for replacements were drawn up with a site at the old Custom House on Essex Quay earmarked for a new design by Benjamin Eaton in 1797 while another design by Richard Johnston in 1805 was proposed for further upriver alongside a new marshalsea to replace the City Marshalsea.

The building was later used as a courthouse. At that point, the corporation took a lease of 100 years of City Assembly House on South William Street from Richard Cranfield.

By 1818, the building was said to be in a ruinous state with only a third of it still in existence and still being used as the Court of Conscience.

== Clerks of the Tholsel ==
The Clerk of the Tholsel or Town Clerk was one of only two elected officials of Dublin Corporation, the other being the Recorder of Dublin.

=== List of Clerks of the Tholsel ===
Year	Clerk of the Tholsel	Deputy Clerk of the Tholsel	Notes
1354	Richard Colman		
1493	Richard Allon		
1563	John Dyllon or Dillon		
1607	Sir Thady Duffe		
1626	John Malone		
1644	Sir Thady Duffe		Employing a William Whyte.
1650	John Preston		
1656	Patrick Tallant		
1659	Patrick Tallant		
1660	Patrick Tallant		
1662	Patrick Tallant		
1663	Richard Blondevile	Richard Blondeville	
1664	Philip Croft	Philip Croft	
1665	Sir William Davys		
1668	Philip Croft		
1670	Sir John Totty		
1671	Sir William Davys		A disagreement between the Lord Lieutenant, John Berkeley, 1st Baron Berkeley of Stratton, the mayor and the aldermen around the rules for regulating the corporation and the admittance of Catholics resulted in the Lord Lieutenant being recalled in May 1672.
1672			
1673	Sir John Totty		Formerly the mayor of Dublin.
1674	Philip Croft		
1677	Philip Croft		
1680	Philip Croft		
1683	Philip Croft		
1686	Philip Croft	Rowland Savage	
1687	John Kearney		
1692	Philip Croft		
1693	Thomas Twigge		
1701	Thomas Twigge		Thomas Twigge died on the 26th of April 1702 having said to have served as the Clerk for 9 years.
1702	Jacob Peppard		Jacob Peppard appointed on the 10th of April 1702.
1705	Jacob Peppard		
1711	Francis Skiddy	Francis Skiddy	
1713	Charles Atkins		
1724	Jacob Peppard		
1725 - 1739	Thomas Gonne		

== See also ==
- Church of St. Nicholas Within, Dublin
- Church of St Nicholas Without, Dublin
- St. Werburgh's Church, Dublin
- Dick's Coffee House
- Recorder of Dublin
