= Dublin Corporation =

Former name of the local authority for the city of Dublin, Ireland (c. 1192–2002)

Dublin Corporation (formally: The Lord Mayor, Aldermen and Burgesses of the City of Dublin) (Irish: Bardas Bhaile Átha Cliath)
- Coat of arms of Dublin City: Motto: Obedientia Civium Urbis Felicitas ("The Obedience of the citizens produces a happy city")

Type
- Type: Local authority
- Houses: Board of Aldermen (1661–1840); Common Council (up to 24 Sheriffs Peers and 96 Commons) (1661–1840); City Council (52 Councillors) (1840–2001)

History
- Established: c. 1192, reformed 1660–1661
- Disbanded: (renamed) 1 January 2002
- Seats: 52 Councillors; 24 Aldermen (1661–1840)

Meeting place
- The Tholsel (prior to 1791); City Assembly House (1791–1852); City Hall (1852 onwards)

Dublin Corporation (Irish: Bardas Bhaile Átha Cliath), known by generations of Dubliners simply as The Corpo, is the former name of the city government and its administrative organisation in Dublin since the 1100s. Significantly re-structured in 1660–1661, even more significantly in 1840, it was modernised on 1 January 2002, as part of a general reform of local government in Ireland, and since then is known as Dublin City Council. This article deals with the history of municipal government in Dublin up to 31 December 2001.

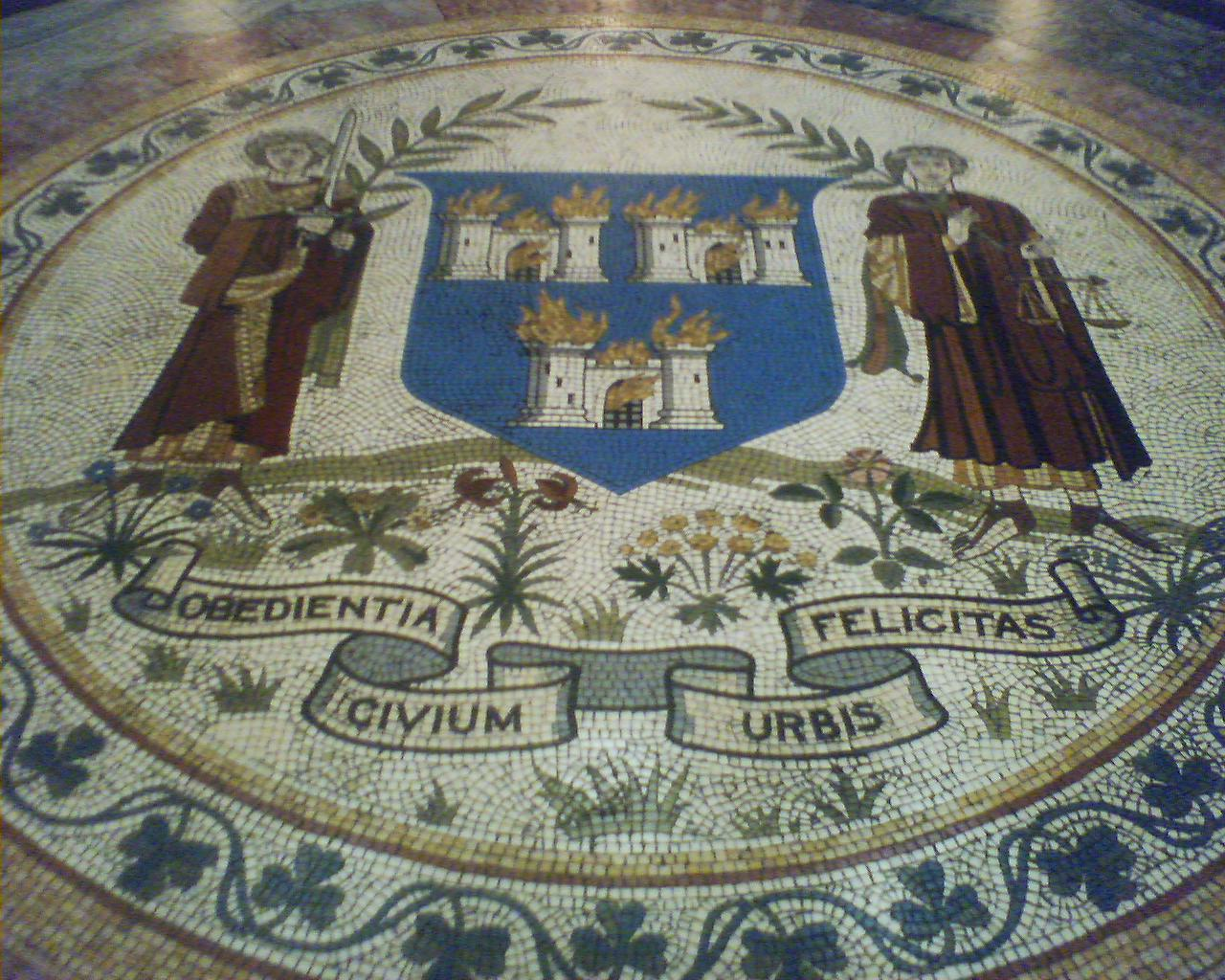
The coat of arms and motto of Dublin Corporation, from a floor mosaic in City Hall. The arms underwent numerous revisions but always featured the original 13th-century image of three burning castles on its shield.

The long form of its name was The Lord Mayor, Aldermen and Burgesses of the City of Dublin.

== History ==
Dublin Corporation was established under the Anglo-Normans in the reign of Henry II in the 12th century early in the Lordship of Ireland.

=== Two-chamber corporation ===
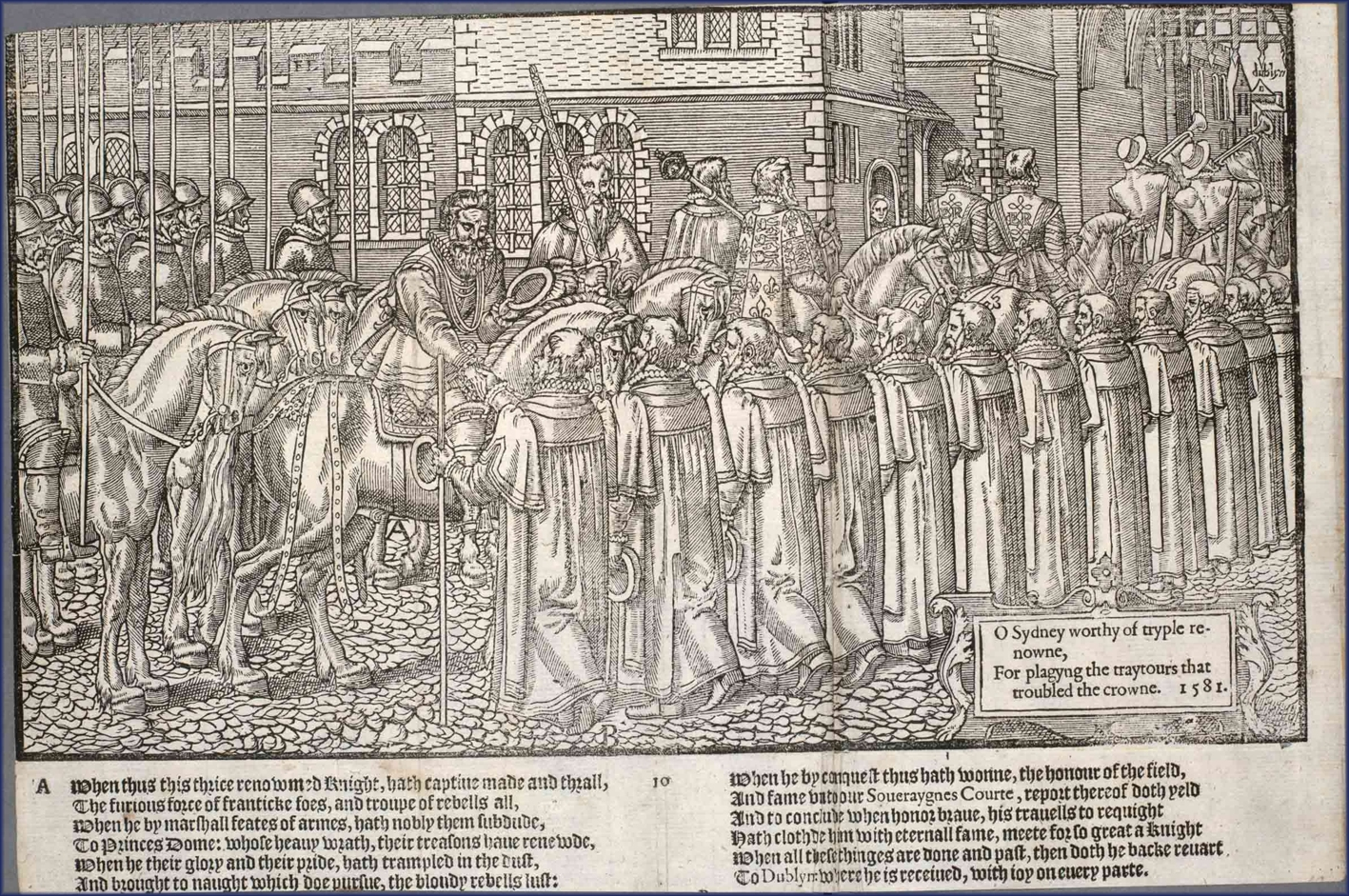
16th century illustration showing the aldermen and Lord Mayor of Dublin welcome back Sir Henry Sidney from battle.

For centuries it was a two-chamber body, made up of an upper house of 24 aldermen, who elected the Lord Mayor of Dublin from their number, and a lower house, known as the "sheriffs and commons", consisting of up to 48 sheriffs peers (former sheriffs of Dublin city) and 96 representatives of the Guilds of the City of Dublin with 31 of those seats controlled by the Merchants' Guild.

The business of the corporation was transacted at The Tholsel at four quarterly assemblies (Christmas, Easter, Midsummer and Michaelmas) while extraordinary assemblies were held at post assemblies.

=== 19th-century reform ===
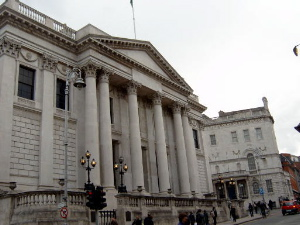
Dublin City Hall (formerly the Royal Exchange)

The modern Dublin Corporation was restructured by late 19th-century and 20th-century legislation, particularly, the Municipal Corporations (Ireland) Act 1840, with the elected body reduced to a single chamber Dublin City Council, presided over by the Lord Mayor of Dublin, an office first instituted but not filled by Charles I and reconstituted following the Stuart Restoration of Charles II.

Queen Victoria refused to visit Ireland for a number of years, partly in protest at Dublin Corporation's decision not to congratulate her son, Prince Albert Edward, the Prince of Wales, on both his marriage to Princess Alexandra of Denmark and on the birth of the royal couple's oldest son, Prince Albert Victor.

=== 21st-century change of name ===
On 1 January 2002, following a major reform of local government in the Local Government Act 2001, which also abolished the 300-year-old title of alderman in the Republic of Ireland and the 700-year-old title of "town clerk" in Dublin, the name Dublin City Council, which previously had been used simply to refer to the assembly of elected councillors, was also used in place of Dublin Corporation for the local authority. The body had full corporate continuity but there were some other changes.

== See also ==
- Lord Mayor of Dublin
- City Hall, Dublin
- Mansion House, Dublin
- Guilds of the City of Dublin

== Sources ==
- Doyle, Mel (1977). "The Dublin Guilds and Journeymen's Clubs". Saothar. 3: 6–14. JSTOR 23195202.
