= Chichester House =

Historic building in Dublin, Ireland

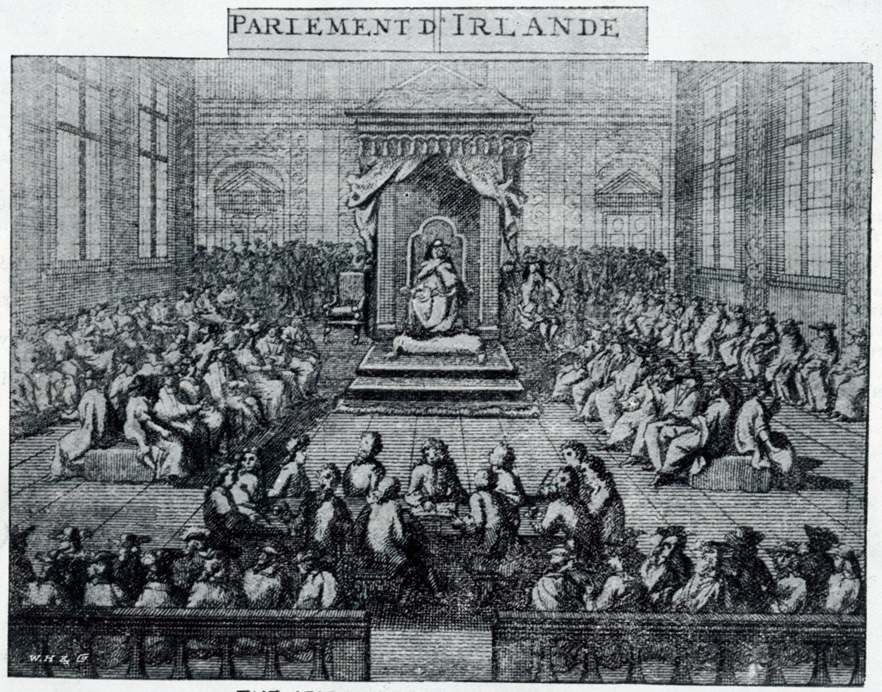
- Speculative interior illustration of Chichester House from a French print of 1704.
- Interactive map of the Chichester House area

General information
- Type: House
- Classification: Demolished
- Location: Ireland
- Coordinates: 53.3449°N 6.2613°W
- Estimated completion: Early 1600s
- Demolished: 1723-28
- Landlord: Edward Parry (until 1650); John Parry (1650-77); Benjamin Parry (1677-

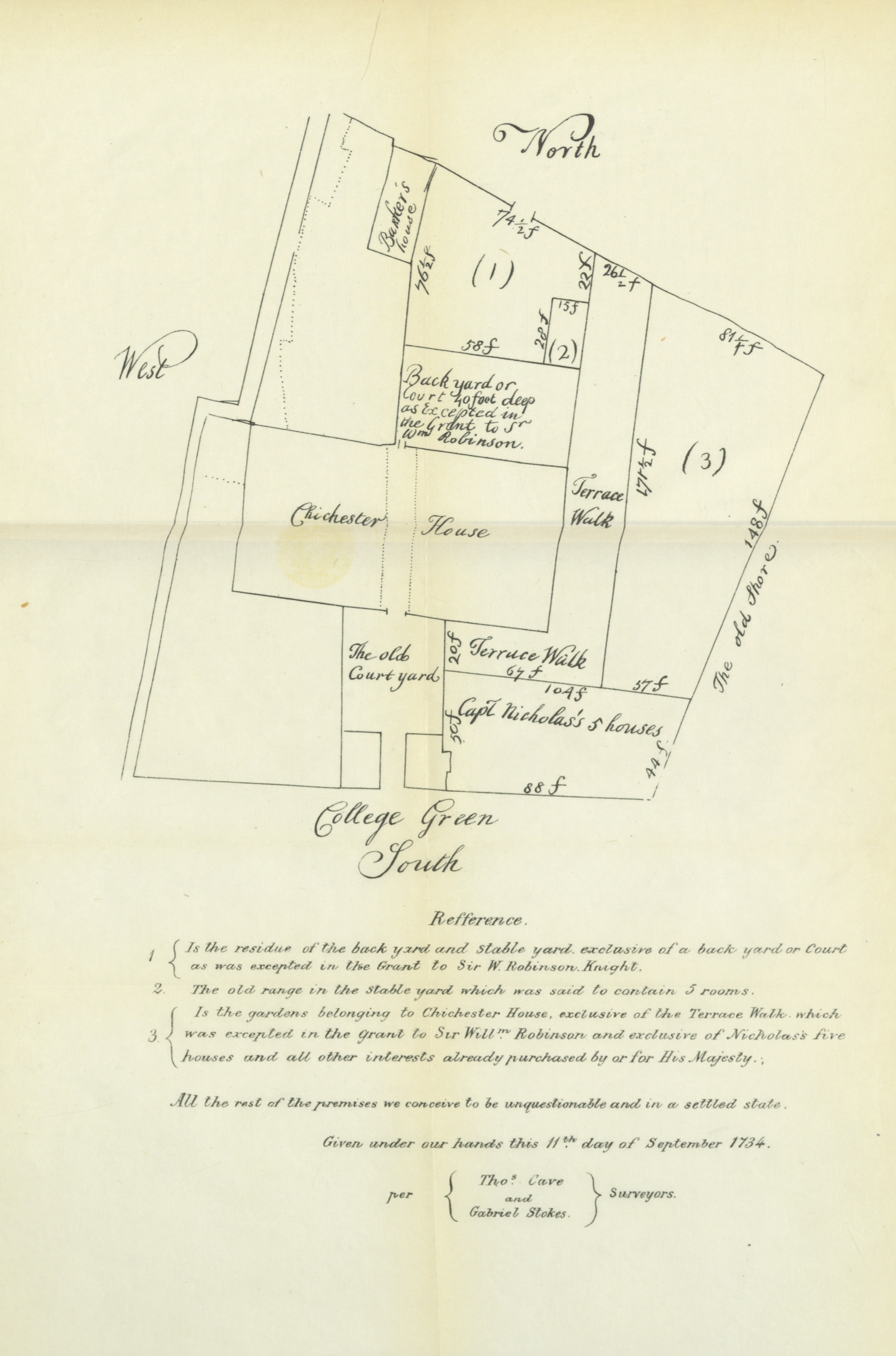
A plan of Chichester House and College Green from 1734 by surveyors Thomas Cave and Gabriel Stokes.

Chichester House or Carew's House was a building in College Green (formerly Hoggen Green), Dublin, Ireland, used from 1661 to the early 1700s to house the Parliament of Ireland. Originally built to be a hospital, it was never used as such.

== History ==
The area around the building features on John Speed's Map of Dublin (1610) where it is noted as "Hospitall" close to the River Liffey shore and Trinity college.

At one time, the building had been owned by Sir George Carew, President of Munster and Lord High Treasurer of Ireland. The house itself was partially built on the site of the Priory of All Hallows which had earlier been dissolved by King Henry VIII.

Carew's House was later purchased by Sir Arthur Chichester and renamed Chichester House. Some sources state that the house was then built by Chichester in the early 17th century. It was used as a temporary home of the Kingdom of Ireland's law courts during the Michaelmas law term in 1605. Documents facilitating the Plantation of Ulster were signed in the house on 16 November 1612.

Following his death in 1625, the house passed to his brother Edward Chichester, 1st Viscount Chichester who in turn sold it to Sir Edward Smyth. It was Smyth who soon after leased the property to Edward Parry as his home.

On the 26th of April 1661, Sir Paul Davys, clerk of the council, leased the great hall from the merchant, Richard White. Later, on the 8th of May 1661, the first parliament convened in Ireland after the Stuart Restoration was held at the house.

In 1673 it was assigned as the home of the parliament by Charles II. In 1675, John Parry had made a lease to Sir Henry Forde, secretary to the Lord Lieutenant of Ireland for a term of 99 years, for the use of the two houses of parliament.

From its opening it was in a bad state of repair and by 1723 a committee had been appointed to report on the condition and estimate the cost of a replacement building on the site.

Following a meeting held in 1728 it was decided that the site would be used for a replacement building, Parliament House, designed by Sir Edward Lovett Pearce, in 1729.
