= List of monastic houses in County Dublin =

The smaller establishments such as monastic cells and notable monastic granges (particularly those with resident monks) and camerae of the military orders of monks (Knights Templars and Knights Hospitallers) are included. The numerous monastic hospitals per se are not included here unless at some time the foundation had, or was purported to have, the status or function of an abbey, priory, or preceptory/commandery.

== Layout ==
Communities/provenance: shows the status and communities existing at each establishment, together with such dates as have been established as well as the fate of the establishment after dissolution, and the current status of the site.

Formal name or dedication: shows the formal name of the establishment or the person in whose name the church is dedicated, where known.

Alternative names: some of the establishments have had alternative names over the course of time. In order to assist in text-searching such alternatives in name or spelling have been provided.

== Abbreviations and key ==
The sites listed are ruins or fragmentary remains unless indicated thus:
*	current monastic function
+	current non-monastic ecclesiastic function
^	current non-ecclesiastic function
=	remains incorporated into later structure
#	no identifiable trace of the monastic foundation remains
~	exact site of monastic foundation unknown
ø	possibly no such monastic foundation at location
¤	no such monastic foundation
≈	identification ambiguous or confused

Locations with names in italics indicate probable duplication (misidentification with another location) or non-existent foundations (either erroneous reference or proposed foundation never implemented).

Trusteeship denoted as follows:
NIEA	Scheduled Monument (NI)
NM	National Monument (ROI)
C.I.	Church of Ireland
R.C.	Roman Catholic Church

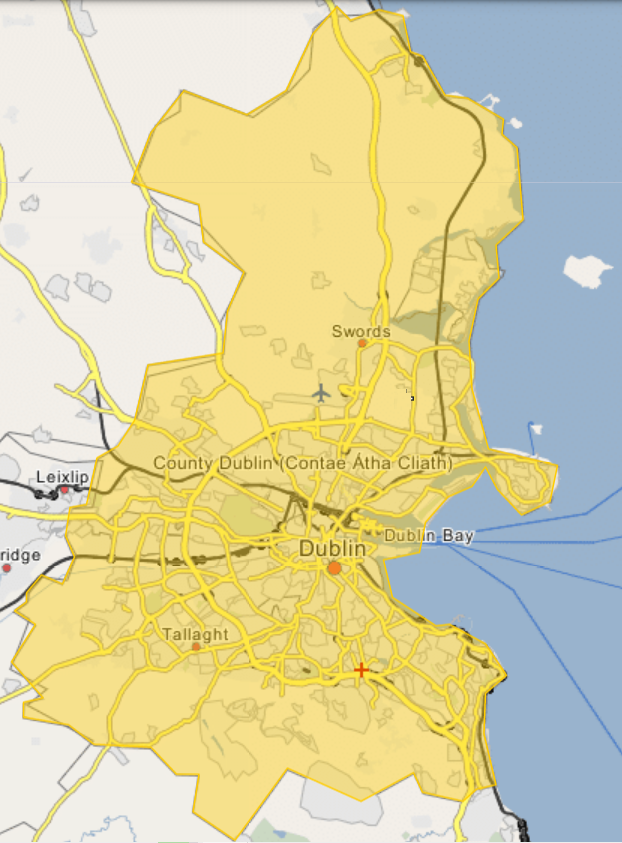
Locations of monastic houses in County Dublin
Locations of monastic houses in Central Dublin

Foundation	Image	Communities & provenance	Formal name or dedication & alternative names	References & location
Balally Monastery ^{~}		supposed Early Christian monastic site (Irish: Baile Amhlaoibh, meaning 'the town of Olaf') may commemorate a Viking saint		
Baldongan Monastery		supposed monastic site of friary & nunnery within the walls of the 13th-century Baldongan Castle - order and period unknown; traditionally Knights Templar preceptory	Baldungan	53°33′48″N 6°06′47″W (approx)
Ballyboghill Monastery		early monastic site, Gaelic monks prior to the arrival of the Anglo-Normans	Ballyboughal	53°31′06″N 6°15′59″W (approx)
Ballymadun Monastery ^{ø}		supposed monastic site — order and period doubtful; purported Augustinian Canons Regular cell	Ballymad with Balrothery	53°32′22″N 6°24′13″W (approx)
Ballyman Monastery ^{ø}		supposed Knights Templar site Glanmonder; Glenmunder	53°12′09″N 6°10′21″W (approx)	
Castleknock Priory		Benedictine monks dependent on Little Malvern; founded c.1185 by Hugh Tyrrell, Lord of Castleknock; erroneously also given as Augustinian (Note: Harris's Table in Ware-Harris, Antiquitie, 1745 and Mervyn Archdall, Monasticon Hibernicum, 1786) dissolved before 1485	St Brigid ____________________; Caislen-cnoc; Caislen-Cnucha	53°22′19″N 6°21′33″W (approx)
Clondalkin Abbey		early monastic site, Gaelic monks, traditionally founded by St Cronan (Mo-Chua); plundered by the Danes, 833; burned 1071; granted to the Culdees in perpetuity; possibly continuing after 1111	Cluain-dolcain; Dun Awley	53°19′19″N 6°23′43″W
Clontarf Monastery		early monastic site, Gaelic monks church founded 550 by St Comgall of Bangor; site now occupied by the remains of St John the Baptist's C.I. parish church	Cluain-tarbh	53°21′58″N 6°12′27″W
Clontarf Preceptory ^{#^}		Knights Templar founded before 1180, granted by Henry II; dissolved 1308-10; Knights Hospitaller refounded 1313 (after 1314); dissolved after 1400; granted to Prior Rawson of Kilmainham; Clontarf Castle built on site, now the Clontarf Castle Hotel	St Congal	53°21′53″N 6°12′26″W
Cruagh Monastery		early monastic site, Gaelic monks founded 5th century by D. Daluan of Croibige in the time of St Patrick	Craibeach; Creevagh	53°14′37″N 6°18′47″W (approx)
Dalkey Island		Benedictine monks chapel	St Begnet ____________________; Deilginis-cualan	
Dublin — All Saints' Priory		Augustinian Canons Regular — Arroasian founded c.1166, Canons installed by Dermot Mac Murrough, King of Leinster; dissolved 1539; granted to Lord Devlin 1565; College of the Holy Trinity built on site by Queen Elizabeth I		53°20′40″N 6°15′28″W
Dublin — Holy Trinity Cathedral and Priory ^{+}		traditional early monastic site, founded 7th century?; church founded c.1030; apparently Benedictine monks before 1085 to 1096; episcopal diocesan cathedral 1152; Augustinian Canons Regular — Arroasian founded c.1163; dissolved 1541; continuing as secular cathedral by Queen Mary		53°20′36″N 6°16′16″W
Dublin — St George's Monastery ^{≈}		purported monastery of St George mentioned 1199, (Note: Calendar of Documents relating to Ireland, edited by H. S. Sweetman and G. F. Handcock, 1875-86) doubtless a reference to St Mary de Hogges, which is located in the parish of St George	St George	
Dublin — St Mary's Abbey		Savignac monks — from Chester founded c.1139; Cistercian monks orders merged 1147-8; apparently dependent on Combermere 1147; apparently dependent on Buildwas 1156-7; attempt to break with Buildwas failed 1307; dissolved 28 October 1539, surrendered by the last abbot, William Laundie; occupied for munitions by John Travers by 1540; granted to James, Earl of Desmond 20 December 1543; (NM)	St Mary ____________________; Baile-atha-cliath; Ath-cliath; Duibhlinne	53°20′52″N 6°16′10″W
Dublin — St Mary de Hogges Abbey		Augustinian nuns — Arroaisian dependent on Clonard; founded c.1146 by Dermot Mac Murrough, King of Leinster; independent from before 1195; dissolved 1536, apparently suppressed early 1536; demolished by William Brabazon, under-treasurer of Ireland, materials used in repair of the King's castle in Dublin; granted to Francis Gosby 26 December 1537; granted to James Sedgrave c.1542	St Mary de Hogges	53°20′36″N 6°15′41″W
Dublin — St. Mary del Dam		purported nunnery; (Note: Mervyn Archdall, Monasticon Hibernicum, 1786, p.173) parish church occupied by a woman recluse 1276-7		
Dublin — St Saviour's Priory *		Dominican Friars; church opened 15 January 1861; priory added 1885; Studium - House of Studies since 2000. extant		53°21′10″N 6°16′02″W
Dublin — St Thomas's Abbey		Augustinian Canons Regular priory founded March 1177 by King Henry II; Augustinian Canons Regular — Victorine raised to abbey status c.1192; dissolved 1539; granted to William Brabazon 1545	The Abbey Church of Saint Thomas the Martyr, Dublin ____________________; Thomas Court	53°20′29″N 6°16′49″W
Dublin Augustinian Friary of the Most Holy Trinity		Augustinian Friars founded c.1259; Observant adopted 1517; dissolved 1540; granted to Robert Casey 6 May 1541	Holy Trinity	
Dublin Augustinian Priory (at the (East) Gate of Dublin)		purported Augustinian Canons Regular (Note: Louis Augustin Alemand, Monasticum Hibernicum, translated and edited by John Stevens, 1722, p.6, however, identical to St Catherine's Priory, which he lists on p.123)		
Dublin Augustinian Priory, St Olave		Augustinian Canons Regular church belonging to Bristol		
Dublin Carmelite Friary *		Carmelite Friars founded 1274 by Sir Robert Bagot, Chief Justice; dissolved 3 August 1539, surrendered by the last prior William Kelly; granted to Nicholas Stanyhurst; demolished before 18 August 1541; granted to Francis Aungier by Elizabeth I modern Carmelite priory built on site, extant	St Mary	53°20′23″N 6°16′00″W
Dublin Priory Hospital		Fratres Cruciferi and nuns founded before 15 November 1588 (1185-8) by Ailred the Palmer; dissolved 1539; granted to Maurice, Earl of Thomond, 1544	St John Baptist ____________________; Palmer's Hospital	
Dublin Dominican Friary		Dominican Friars founded 1224; destroyed by fire in Dublin 1304; rebuilt before 1308 by Eustace le Poer; dissolved 1539; granted to Sir Thomas Cusack 1542; granted to the Earl of Ormond 1578; The King's Inns established on site c.1582;	St Saviour	53°20′46″N 6°16′30″W
Dublin Dominican Friary, later site		Dominican Friars founded c.1622		53°20′39″N 6°16′27″W (approx)
Dublin Franciscan Friary *		Franciscan Friars Minor, Conventual founded before 13 January 1233 (possibly on an earlier site); possibly transferred here c.1236; Observant Franciscan Friars adopted 1521; dissolved 1540; granted to Thomas Stephens 1541		53°20′27″N 6°16′26″W
Dublin Franciscan Friary *		Franciscan Friars Minor, Conventual extant	Adam and Eve's	53°20′42″N 6°16′21″W
Dublin Knights Hospitallers		Knights Hospitaller frankhouse of Kilmainham, founded before 1290; continued until the suppression		53°20′38″N 6°16′18″W (approx)
Dublin Sack Friars		Friars of the Sack probably founded 1268; dissolved after 1309-10		
Finglas Monastery		early monastic site, Gaelic monks founded 560 by St Canice; possibly not continuing after 10th century (last recorded abbot died in Rome 1038); site occupied by remains of a medieval church	Fin-ghlais; Fionn-ghlais; Fionn-glass	53°23′16″N 6°17′59″W (approx)
Firhouse Carmelite Monastery *		Carmelite nuns extant		53°16′49″N 6°20′26″W
Glasmore Monastery		early monastic site, Gaelic monks founded by St Cronan (Mochua)	Glaismor; Moortown	53°29′11″N 6°18′49″W (approx)
Glasnevin Monastery		early monastic site, Gaelic monks founded before 545 by St Mobi; possibly not continuing after 10th century	Glas-naoidhen; Glais-noiden	53°23′34″N 6°14′15″W (approx)
Grace Dieu Abbey, nr. Donabate		Augustinian nuns — Arroaisian — from Lusk; (community founded at Lusk after 1144) transferred here c.1195; founded after 1195? by John Cumin, Archbishop of Dublin; dissolved 1539; Turvey House was built from the remains of the abbey	St Mary ____________________ de Gratia Dei; Turvey House	53°30′02″N 6°11′23″W (approx)
Grange Abbey		chapel of All Saints' Priory; disused since 17th century; ruined; (NM)		53°23′57″N 6°09′38″W
Holmpatrick Priory, Skerries		Augustinian Canons Regular — from St Patrick's Island founded 1220; dissolved 1557; granted to Thomas FitzWilliams 1578; site now occupied by C.I. church	Holm Patric; Inis-patraic; Skerries	53°34′25″N 6°06′20″W
Howth 'Abbey' ^{ø}		non-monastic collegiate church	The Collegiate Church of St. Mary Howth	53°23′15″N 6°03′57″W
Ireland's Eye Monastery		early monastic site; besieged 897; plundered 960		53°24′18″N 6°03′50″W (approx)
Killester Monastery		purported remains of a monastery in Killester House (Note: Gazetteer of Great Britain and Ireland, iii, p.447)		53°22′20″N 6°12′28″W (?)
Killiney Monastery		early monastic site, Gaelic nuns		53°15′17″N 6°06′59″W (?)
Killiney Friary *		Franciscan Friars founded 1945; extant	Dun Mhuire	53°15′02″N 6°06′55″W
Killininny Monastery		early monastic site, Gaelic nuns	Cell-na-n-ingen; Kilnaninghean	53°16′22″N 6°21′03″W (?)
Kilmacud Carmelite Monastery *		Carmelite nuns founded 1881; extant	St Joseph	53°17′06″N 6°12′30″W
Kilmainham Monastery		early monastic site, founded 7th century by St Magnenn (Maignenn/Maighnenn) (in the time of St Fursey); later Knights Hospitaller site (see immediately below)	Cell-maignenn; Kil-maignend	53°21′03″N 6°20′19″W (?)
Kilmainham Preceptory		Knights Hospitaller founded c.1174 by Richard Fitz Gilbert de Clare, Strongbow, Earl of Pembroke and Striguil, on the site of earlier monastery (see immediately above); erroneously given as Knights Templar ; (Note: Mervyn Archdall, Monasticon Hibernicum, 1768, p.221, and others) dissolved 1540; restored 1557; dissolved November 1558	Priory of St John the Baptist	53°21′03″N 6°20′19″W (?)
Kilnamanagh Monastery		early monastic site	Cell-na-managh	53°17′53″N 6°21′51″W (?)
Kilsallaghan Monastery		purported monastic site, order, foundation and period unknown	Kilsaghlan	53°28′29″N 6°19′09″W (approx)
Kinsaley Monastery ^{=?}		early monastic site, founded by St Garban (Gobban) or St Doulagh; St Doulagh C.I. parish church built on site	Cean-saile; Cenn-saile; Kinsealy	53°24′55″N 6°10′45″W
Lambay Island Monastery ^{#}		early monastic site, founded by St Colmcille	Reachrainn; Rechra; Lambey	53°29′18″N 6°01′25″W
Loreto Abbey ^{^}		Sisters of Loreto founded 1821 by Frances Ball at Rathfarnham House		53°17′32″N 6°16′48″W
Loreto Abbey, Dalkey		Sisters of Loreto founded 1843 by Frances Ball; boarding school for girls opened 17 August 1843; boarding school closed 1982, continuing as a day school		53°16′47″N 6°06′00″W
Lusk Abbey ^{=+}		early monastic site, founded before 496/8, possibly c.450, by Cuinnidh mac Cathmugh (St MacCullin), who died 496/8; burned and plundered by the Danes 827 and 856; burned and plundered by Munstermen 1053; burned by men of Meath 1133; St MacCullin's C.I. parish church built on site, incorporating round tower into tower	Lusca	53°31′34″N 6°10′03″W
'The Abbey', Malahide		ruins of a chapel	Alahid; Mullachide	53°26′42″N 6°09′49″W
Malahide Carmelite Monastery *		Carmelite nuns extant	Star of the Sea Carmelite Monastery	53°26′39″N 6°08′26″W
Newcastle Monastery		early monastic site, founded by a St Finnian	Caislean-nua-liamhain	
Portrane Priory		Augustinian nuns — Arroasian — from Grace Dieu founded 1539; dissolved after 1577		
Rathmichael Monastery, Carrickgolligan Hill		early monastic site, enclosure with slight remains of church and round tower		53°13′58″N 6°08′47″W
Red Island Monastery, Skerries				
Roebuck Carmelite Monastery *		Carmelite nunsSee Roebuck, Dublin	The Immaculate Conception	53°18′14″N 6°13′52″W
Saggart Monastery		early monastic site	Tech-sacra; Tassagard	53°35′04″N 6°04′34″W (approx)
St Anne's Monastery		early monastic site, possibly founded by Bishop Sanctain (possibly St Sanctain)	St Anne ____________________; Killeaspuigsanctain; St Anne's Chapel	
St Catherine's Priory		Augustinian Canons Regular — Victorine founded 1219 by Warisius dePech; cell dependent on St Thomas's, Dublin, 1323; dissolved 1539, surrendered 25 June 1539	St Katherine; Salmon Leap	53°22′06″N 6°28′11″W (approx)
St Doolagh's Monastery		early monastic site, founded by St Doolagh? chapel and cell 1200 possibly built for a hermit or small community	St Doolagh ____________________; St Doilough; Clochar	53°24′25″N 6°09′42″W (approx)
St Patrick's Island Monastery		early monastic site, founded by St Patrick burned by the Danes 798; Augustinian Canons Regular founded after 1140; dissolved 1220, transferred to a new site at Holmpatrick	Inis Patraic	53°35′04″N 6°04′34″W
Santry Monastery		early monastic site, founded by 6th century	Sentrebh	53°23′23″N 6°15′08″W (approx)
Sruthair Monastery		early monastic site, possibly in County Dublin	Sruther	
Swords Monastery ^{=}		early monastic site, founded c.560 by St Columbkill (Note: Mervyn Archdall, Monasticon Hibernicum, 1786 p.256)	Sord-coluim-cille; Suird	53°27′27″N 6°13′28″W
Swords Priory		nuns 1474 mention of a prioress here probably refer to Grace Dieu (Note: King's Collection manuscripts, compiled by Dr Madden, late 17th century, revised by Harris, National Library of Ireland and Trinity College Dublin, p.136 (Mervyn Archdall, Monasticon Hibernicum, 1786), but see Extents of Irish Monastic Possessions 1540-1, edited by Newport D. White (Irish MSS. Commission), 1943, p.75)		
Tallaght Monastery ^{#+}		early monastic site, founded 769 by Saint Maelruan; burned and plundered 811 by the Danes; rebuilt; possibly not continuing after 1125; site now occupied by St Maelruain's C.I. parish church	Tamlacht-maelruain; Taulaght	53°17′21″N 6°21′57″W
Tallaght, St. Mary's Priory *		Dominican Friars founded 1855; novitate; new wing added 1903 connecting church and tower; library block completed in 1958; Studium 1935-2000; The Priory Institute incorporated 2000 extant	St Mary	53°17′19″N 6°21′38″W
Taney Monastery		early monastic site		53°17′01″N 6°13′33″W (approx)
Tullow/Tully Monastery?		early monastic site, founded by St Brigid (possibly Brigid, daughter of Leinin); ruined 13th-century church may occupy site of an Early Christian monastic site	Telach--na-n-epscop; Tulach-na-n-epscop; Irish: tulach na n-Epscop, meaning 'the hill of the bishops'	53°16′44″N 6°11′05″W

The following location in County Dublin lacks monastic connection:

- Rathfarnham Priory: sometime home of the Curran family

== Map link to lists of monastic houses in Ireland by county ==
Click on a county to go to the corresponding article.	Antrim; Armagh; Down; Fermanagh; Londonderry; Tyrone; Carlow; Cavan; Clare; Cork; Donegal; Dublin; Galway; Kerry; Kildare; Kilkenny; Laois; Leitrim; Limerick; Longford; Louth; Mayo; Meath; Monaghan; Offaly; Roscommon; Sligo; Tipperary; Waterford; Westmeath; Wexford; Wicklow

== See also ==
- List of monastic houses in Ireland
