= John Speed's Map of Dublin (1610) =

17th-century map of central Dublin, Ireland

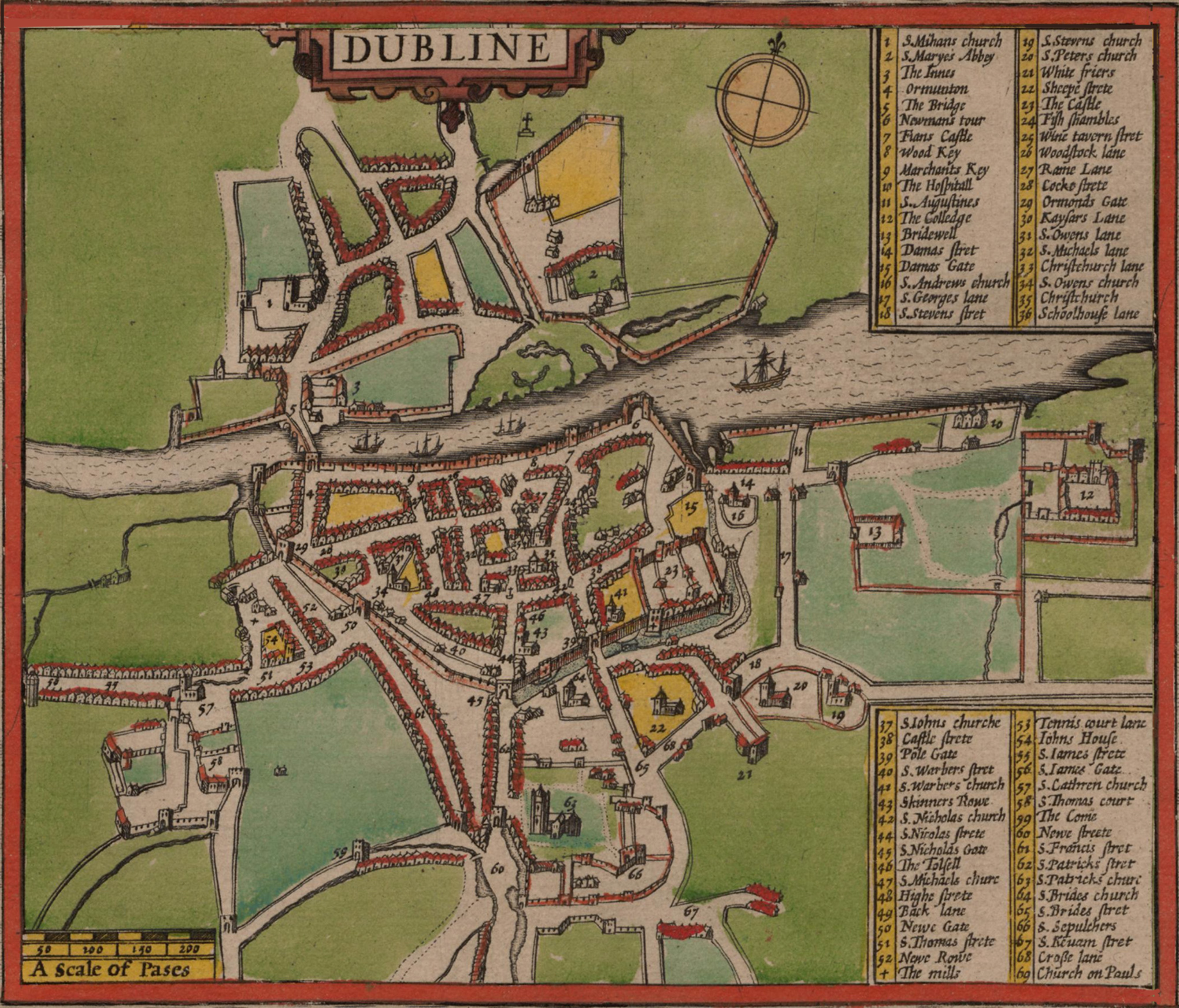
Colourised version of the map of 1610.

John Speed's Map of Dublin of 1610 was one of the first detailed maps of Dublin and the first published map of Dublin, produced by cartographer John Speed around 1610 and printed first in London in 1611.

It appeared as an inset in a map of the Province of Leinster in Speed's atlas The Theatre of the Empire of Great Britaine and features 69 placenames and other locations annotated at the side by symbols, geographic features or crude illustrations. Speed's map combines information borrowed from other maps but also appears to have mapped most of the town plans himself.

It is the oldest surviving map of the city of Dublin. The next authoritative map of Dublin wasn't until Herman Moll's map of 1714, which drew heavily on Speed's map, followed by Charles Brooking's map of Dublin (1728) and John Rocque's maps from 1756 onwards.

== List of annotated locations ==
Number	Name (sic)	Name	Details
1	S. Mihans church	St. Michan's Church, Dublin	The church also gives its name to Church Street which is also detailed on the map, although not annotated, as one of the main thoroughfares heading northwards from the River Liffey.
2	S. Maryes Abbey	St. Mary's Abbey, Dublin	
3	The Innes	King's Inns	Later to become the site of the Four Courts.
4	Ormunton	Oxmantown	
5	The Bridge	Father Mathew Bridge	
6	Newmans tour		Newman’s (or Isolde’s) Tower which were rediscovered and excavated in 1993. See List of gates of Dublin.
7	Fians Castle		Referred to since at least 1305 as Fyan's Castle and later sometimes referred to as Proudfoot's Castle on later maps.
8	Wood Key	Wood Quay	
9	Marchants Key	Merchant's Quay	
10	The Hospitall	Chichester House	Later the site of Parliament House, Dublin.
11	S. Augustines	Augustinian Friary of the Most Holy Trinity, Dublin	
12	The Colledge	Trinity College Dublin	
13	Bridewell		An archaic term for a prison or house for the homeless, named for a prison beside St Bride's Well in the City of London, near which such a building stood.
14	Damas Stret	Dame Street	Named for St. Mary del Dam
15	Damas Gate	Dame Street	See List of gates of Dublin.
16	S. Andrews church	St Andrew's Church, Dublin (Church of Ireland)	
17	S. Georges lane	South Great George's Street	
18	S. Stevens Stret	Stephen Street, Dublin	Takes its name from St Stephen's Church
19	S. Stevens church		Takes its name from St Stephen's Church
20	S. Peters church	St. Peter's Church, Aungier Street, Dublin	
21	White friers	Whitefriar Street Carmelite Church	
22	Sheepe Strete	Ship Street Little	
23	The Castle	Dublin Castle	
24	Fish Shambles	Fishamble Street	
25	Wine Tavern Stret	Winetavern Street	
26	Woodstock lane		Referred to since at least 1270 as Woodstock Lane and later and sometimes earlier as Rosemary lane. It connected Cook Street with Merchants Quay.
27	Rame Lane		Referred to since medieval times as Skippers Alley and later as Rame Lane. It connected Cook Street with Merchants Quay and Ushers Quay.
28	Cocke Strete	Cook Street, Dublin	
29	Ormonds Gate		See List of gates of Dublin. Also referred to as Wormwood Gate and Gormund Gate.
30	Kaysars Lane	Keyser's Lane	It connected Cook Street to Newgate Street (Cornmarket). It was a common Norse era name used in other Viking cities and towns across Ireland and corrupted versions of the name include Kishers Lane and Kaysers Lane.
31	S. Owens lane	St. Audoen's Church, Dublin (Church of Ireland)	
32	S. Michaels lane	St. Michael's Church, Dublin	
33	Christchurch lane	Christ Church Cathedral, Dublin	
34	S. Owens church	St. Audoen's Church, Dublin (Church of Ireland)	
35	Christchurch	Christ Church Cathedral, Dublin	
36	Schoolhouse lane		A reference to a nearby schoolhouse.
37	S. Johns churche	Church of St. John the Evangelist, Dublin	
38	Castle Strete		A reference to Dublin Castle.
39	Pole Gate		A reference to the nearby Church of St Michael le Pole which partially took its name from the nearby pool of Dublin created by the River Poddle to the rear of Dublin Castle. See List of gates of Dublin.
40	S. Warbers Stret	Werburgh Street	
41	S. Warbers church	St. Werburgh's Church, Dublin	
42	Skinners Rowe	Skinners Row	
43	S. Nicholas church	Church of St. Nicholas Within, Dublin	
44	S. Nicholas Strete		A reference to the Church of St. Nicholas Within, Dublin.
45	S. Nicholas Gate		A reference to the Church of St Nicholas. See List of gates of Dublin.
46	The Tolsell	The Tholsel, Dublin	
47	S Michaels Church	St. Michael's Church, Dublin	
48	Highe Strete	High Street, Dublin	
49	Back lane		The street later famously held the back lane parliament and still contains Tailors' Hall.
50	New Gate		See List of gates of Dublin and Newgate Prison, Dublin
51	S. Thomas Strete	Thomas Street, Dublin	
52	New Rowe		Still extant as New Row
+	The mills		Mill complex on the map which isn't numbered.
53	Tennis court lane		A reference presumably to a nearby tennis court, one of the first references to organised sport in the city.
54	Johns House		Close to present day John's Lane Church.
55	S. James Strete		A reference to St James' Church, Dublin (Church of Ireland).
56	S. James Gate	St. James's Gate	See List of gates of Dublin.
57	S. Cathren church	St Catherine's Church, Dublin (Church of Ireland)	
58	S. Thomas court	Abbey of St Thomas the Martyr	
59	The Come	The Coombe, Dublin	
60	New Streete		Still extant as New Street
61	S. Francis Stret		Still extant as Francis Street
62	S. Patricks Stret	Patrick Street, Dublin	
63	S. Patricks church	St Patrick's Cathedral, Dublin	
64	S. Brides church	St. Bride's Church, Dublin	
65	S. Brides Stret	Bride Street	
66	S. Sepulchers	St. Sepulchre's Palace	A reference to the Palace of the Manor of St. Sepulchre which is still extant and forms a police station.
67	S. Kevan Stret	St. Kevin's Church, Camden Row, Dublin	Beside present day Wexford Street.
68	Cross lane	Golden Lane, Dublin	
69	Church on Pauls	Church of St Michael le Pole	Likely meant to be "Church on Pool", the pool being the pool created by the Poddle nearby from which Dublin gets its name. The actual number 69 does not appear annotated on the map itself and only appears in the reference schedule.
+	Market Cross		Featured on the map between Christchurch and St Michaels church. A drawing of the cross was recorded by John Simmons as late as 1776 but it was likely removed soon after this point.

== See also ==
- Charles Brooking's map of Dublin (1728)
- Cartography of Dublin
- Bernard de Gomme
- Herman Moll
- Joseph Tudor
- James Malton
