= John Elliott (judge) =

Irish judge

Sir John Elliott (1546–1617) was an Irish judge of the late sixteenth and early seventeenth centuries, who held office as third Baron of the Court of Exchequer (Ireland). He was also occasionally employed on diplomatic missions. Though his highly successful career was due partly to his own merits, it probably also owed something to his useful family connections, notably with the Rochfort family and the Usshers.

== Background ==
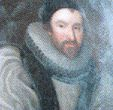
Henry Ussher, Archbishop of Armagh, Elliott's brother-in-law

He was born at Balreask (or Balrisk), County Meath, son of Thomas Elliott, former Master Gunner for Ireland, and Elizabeth Smart. His sister Margaret was the first wife of Henry Ussher, Archbishop of Armagh. The two men were close friends, and the Archbishop made Elliott co-executor of his will of 1613. Elliott and his second wife Ismay built a church (now a ruin) on the Archbishop's lands at Balsoon in County Meath, and are buried there. Elliott inherited Balreask about 1595.

== Career ==
The date of his call to the Bar is uncertain, but he is recorded as a member of Lincoln's Inn in 1587. He was then made Clerk of the Crown for four counties of Ulster. He was appointed a Baron of the Exchequer in 1590, and was praised for his hard work and diligence. During the Nine Years War, he was sent to negotiate with the Gaelic leader Hugh O'Neill, 2nd Earl of Tyrone in 1596. Following the establishment of the Irish Assize system for the whole island in 1603-4, he went on circuit regularly as a judge of assize. This no doubt raised his credit with the English Crown, which complained that many judges were reluctant to travel outside Dublin. He was knighted in 1609.

In 1607 the King's Inns, after a hiatus of some years, was revived. Elliott became Treasurer of the Inns in the same year. He was the first member of the Inns to have a barrister's chambers "the first that began to build a chamber in the King's Inns", and as a special privilege three of his sons, who were described as "attorneys", were allowed to share the chambers. They also had their fees remitted, in recognition of Sir John's services to the Inns. He served as Treasurer until 1610.

During the Flight of the Earls he and his colleague Sir Christopher Sibthorpe of the Court of King's Bench (Ireland) were sent to Ulster in the winter of 1607 with the formal indictment for rebellion against Tyrone and Rory O'Donnell, 1st Earl of Tyrconnell. During the Parliament of 1613-15 he attended with his colleague, Sir William Sparke of the Court of King's Bench, before the House of Lords to act as their legal advisor, a role commonly performed by the High Court judges at the time.

== Death ==
He died in 1617 and was buried with his second wife Ismay Rochfort in Balsoon Church, which they had built. Though the church is in a ruined condition their gravestone is still visible.

== Marriages and children ==
He married four times and had issue by his second marriage. His first wife was Joan Might, daughter of Thomas Might. His second wife was Ismay Rochfort, daughter of Christopher Rochfort of Kilbryde, County Meath and his wife Margaret Lynch. They had four sons, Henry, Thomas, Oliver and Christopher, three of whom followed their father into the legal profession. His third wife, whom he married after 1602, was Archbishop Ussher's cousin Eleanor Ussher, daughter of Alderman Robert Ussher of Santry and his first wife Margaret Fitzjohn. She was the widow of Walter Ball, Mayor of Dublin (died 1598) and of Dr. Robert Conway, Master in the Court of Chancery (Ireland) (died 1602). Eleanor died in 1613, and Sir John made a fourth marriage to Alice Kennedy, daughter of Hugh Kennedy of Dublin and widow of John Arthur.

== Sources ==
- Ball, F. Elrington The Judges in Ireland 1221-1921 London John Murray 1926
- Kenny, Colum King's Inns and the Kingdom of Ireland Dublin Irish Academic Press 1992
- Lodge, John Peerage of Ireland Dublin 1754
- Montgomery-Massingberd, Hugh Burke's Irish Family Records London 1976
- Wright, William Bell The Ussher Memoirs Dublin Sealy Bryers and Walker 1889
- "Ussher, Henry (1550?-1613)" . Dictionary of National Biography. London: Smith, Elder & Co. 1885–1900.
