= Edward Parry (bishop of Killaloe) =

Anglican Irish bishop

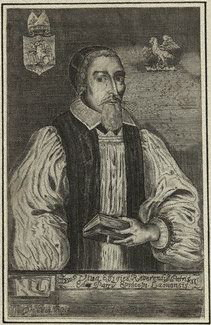
An engraved portrait by John Dickson of Dr. Edward Parry, Bishop of Killaloe, from a book authored by the bishop entitled "David restored; or an Antidote against the Prosperity of the Wicked, and the Afflictions of the Just", published at Oxford in 1660.

Edward Parry (c.1599 – 20 July 1650) was Church of Ireland Bishop of Killaloe, County Clare, Ireland from 28 March 1647 until his death 20 July 1650.

== Career ==
Parry was the son of Rhys Parry, a merchant of Newry, County Down. The name of his mother is disputed. The 'Pedigree of Parry of Newry, Co. Down and City of Dublin 1560–1735', pp. 86–88, in MS. 173, Genealogical Office, Dublin states his mother was named Frances Price. The will of his father also refers to My wife Frances Parrie. However the Cheshire Sheaf issue of September 1883, page 72, states his mother was Mary Darby. He was born c. 1599 in Madyn Dyswy, Amlwch, Anglesey, Wales. His siblings were Arthur, Grace and Magdalen. Bishop Parry was educated in Newry where his father was chaplain to Sir Nicholas Bagenal, (It seems improbable that Rhys Parry was chaplain to Nicholas Bagenal, as Nicholas died in 1591 when Rhys was about 20 years old. It looks as if Rhys moved to Ireland shortly after the birth of Edward, as Edward's siblings were born in Newry, not Anglesey. At that time Arthur Bagenal, Nicholas Bagenals grandson received a patent of James II in 1637 confirming a grant and mortgages, wherein he held a Newry monastic building at the corner of Castle Street which is referred to in error as a Castle by some authors, this was formerly Abbot Crellys Cistercian built House Circa 1144 (see Crelly, Bagenal 1588 patent). Newry had one Bagenal Castle at all dates in the Bagenal reign in the town.) In 1616 he enrolled as a student of Trinity College, Dublin where he graduated in Easter 1620 as a B.A. He obtained his master's degree there in 1623 and a fellowship in 1624. In Easter 1630 he graduated as a Doctor of Divinity and later became Pro Vice-Chancellor of the college.

In Anglican politics he was regarded as a Laudian. In 1627 he was appointed Prebendary of Tipperkevin, a living belonging to St Patrick's Cathedral, Dublin. In 1630 he was Incumbent of St. Bride's Church, Dublin, where several of his children were baptised. In 1634 he was made Treasurer of Christ Church Cathedral, Dublin and chaplain to Lancelot Bulkeley, Archbishop of Dublin. In 1635 he was appointed one of the High Commission for Ecclesiastical Causes. In 1636 he was appointed Prebendary of Stagonyl, another living belonging to St Patrick's Cathedral, Dublin. By patent dated 28 April he was presented to St. Olave's in Waterford where he was installed on 11 May, but was also licensed to hold his other preferments at the same time. In 1640 he resigned from St. Olave's and was appointed Dean of Lismore, County Waterford. Some of the Deanery lands had been seized by Richard Boyle, 1st Earl of Cork and Dean Parry tried to get them back but failed. His successor as Dean of Lismore was his first cousin, Robert Parry. In 1643 he was Archdeacon of Glendalough, County Wicklow.

On 29 December 1646 King Charles I of England in a letter stated he favoured Edward Parry for the See of the Diocese of Killaloe, County Clare. On 20 March 1647 a patent was issued confirming his appointment as Bishop of Killaloe and he was consecrated at Christ Church Cathedral, Dublin, on 28 March 1647 by Lancelot Bulkeley, Archbishop of Dublin, assisted by the Bishops of Kildare and Cloyne. However, as this was in the middle of the Irish Rebellion he was unable to travel to his diocese and remained in Dublin, where he resided in Chichester House, St. Stephen's Street, which building later housed the Irish Parliament. In the Hearth Money Rolls the house was assessed for eight hearths so was quite large. On 9 July 1647 he signed the petition of the clergy praying to be allowed the use of the Liturgy, then abolished by order of the commissioners under Oliver Cromwell. On account of his good character and the smallness of the revenues of Killaloe, the King permitted him to hold his former preferments in commendam [Rot. Pat. 19 Car. I.].

Bishop Parry died in his house in St. Stephen's Street on 20 July 1650 at the age of 51, after contracting the plague which raged there, and was buried in St. Audoen's Church, Dublin. His will dated 17 July 1650 was proved in the Prerogative Court, Dublin. Its terms were, inter alia,- (1) "My Body to be interred in St. Audeon's Church neere the doors, with my face to the East, where also I desire the body of my deare wife may be translated, and laid by my side, if it may be." (2) "I give to my eldest daughter, Mary Parry, alias Bulkeley, a little silver watch, and her mother's dear-head ring. (3) To his other daughter "Eleynor Parry" other ornaments that belonged to her mother. (4) To his sister "Madelius Evans" five pounds (5) To other beneficiaries were given legacies out of the fifty pounds due to him by William Usher (6) To his "cosen, Robert Parry" he left his lexicon and other books (7) To his "loving cosen, Richard Parry" he left a gold ring (8) To his cosen "Mary Parry", wife of Richard, he left a money legacy (9) He appointed "his cosen, Robert Parry as overseer" of his will

== Works ==
Bishop Parry wrote a book entitled David restored; or an Antidote against the Prosperity of the Wicked, and the Afflictions of the Just, which was a Sermon on the seventy-third Psalm; this was afterwards published by his son, John Parry (bishop) at Oxford in 1660. This work contains an engraved portrait of Edward Parry (see right).

== Descendants ==
Edward Parry married the daughter of John Price and by her had six children, who were John Parry, Bishop of Ossory; Benjamin Parry, Bishop of Ossory; Edward Parry; Robert Parry; Mary Parry who married John Bulkeley; and Elinor Parry who was a love and correspondent of John Locke and later married Richard Hawkshaw.

== Monument ==
The vestry book of St. Audeon's Church, Dublin states at 16 April 1681 that in a recess on the northern side of the church door, a corner of the north-west part of the church (now the vestibule) was railed off with "a rail and banister", for the Parry family burial place. It measured 14 feet by 8 feet and a rent of forty shillings a year was due for it by the Parry family, which was split fifty-fifty between the Prebendary and Churchwardens of St. Audeons. It acquired the name of the "Bishop of Ossory's Chapel". Many generations of the Parrys were buried in this tomb, which, having become defaced by time, was, on the repair of the Church in 1848, surmounted with an inscribed white marble slab at the expense of Dr. John Parry's representatives, Dame Emma Elizabeth Puleston of Albrighton Hall, Shropshire, relict of Sir Richard Puleston, Bart., Anna Eleanora, Frances and Elizabeth Hawkshaw, daughters of Lieutenant Colonel John Stuart Hawshaw of Divernagh, County Armagh. The monument of the spot, which still exists, reads- "In memory of Edward Parry and his two sons John and Benjamin Parry, who were interred near this spot. Edward Parry, D.D., Pro-Vice-Chancellor of the University of Trinity College, Dublin, was consecrated Bishop of Killaloe, 28 March 1647, and died of the plague in this city, 20 July 1650. John Parry, D.D., was promoted to the Deanery of Christ's Church, Dublin, Apl. 2, 1666; was consecrated Bishop of Ossory Apl. 22, 1672; and departed this life 21 December 1677. Benjamin Parry DD was promoted to the Deanery of St Canices Kilkenny 19 February 1673, to the Deanery of St. Patrick's Dublin 17 February 1674, was consecrated Bishop of Ossory on the death of his brother John Parry and departed this life 4 October 1678. On the repairing of this church AD 1848 by permission of the Rev. James Howie AM prebendary of the same. Dame Emma Elizabeth Puleston of Albrighton Hall, Shropshire relict of Sir Richard Puleston Bart and Anna, Eleanora, Frances, and Elizabeth Hawkshaw, daughters of the late Lieut Colene John Stewart Hawkshaw of Divernagh Co. Armach, caused this new monument to be erected in memory of the above named bishops. The said Sir Richard Puleston and Lieut. Colonel John Steward Hawkshaw having been Lineally descended from the above named Edward Parry. The monument underneath was the one originally erected by the said John Parry to the memory of his Father Edward Parry"
