= William Sparke =

English-born judge in Ireland

- Born: Suffolk
- Died: 1623; Dublin
- Occupation: Judge
- Known for: Sparke Memorial, St. Audoen's Church, Dublin

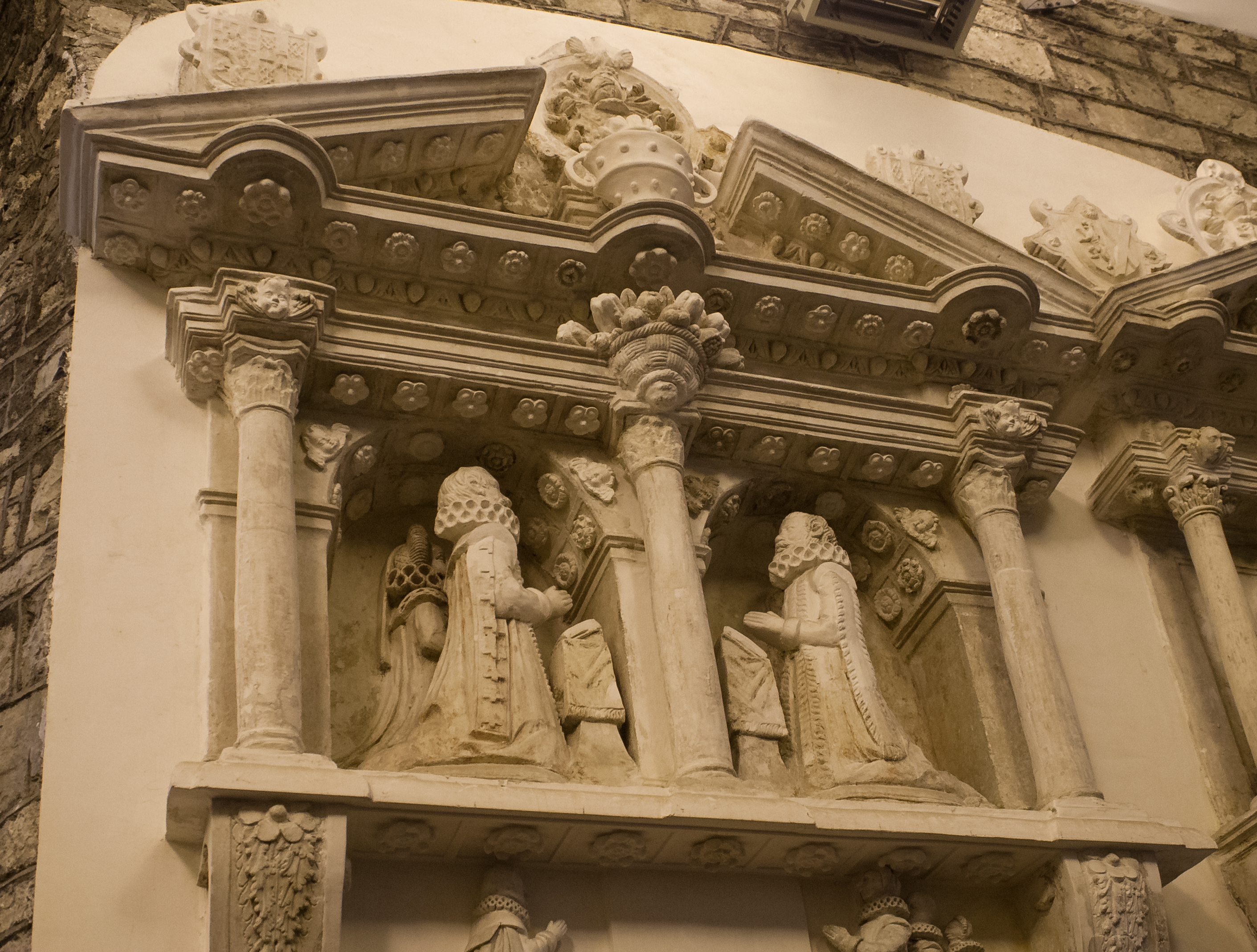
Memorial to Sir William Sparke and his second wife Mary, St. Audoen's Church, Dublin, erected by Lady Sparke in William's memory

Sir William Sparke (died 1623) was an English-born judge in Ireland, whose memorial can still be seen in St. Audoen's Church, Dublin.

== Career ==
He was born in Suffolk. He studied law at Thavie's Inn, and then Lincoln's Inn. He was called to the Bar in 1594. He appears to have lived in Ireland for some years in the 1590s. Joan Sparke, who died in Dublin in 1596, and was the wife of Stephen Sedgrave of Dublin, was clearly a close relative, possibly a sister, of William. There is a memorial to Joan and Stephen in St. Audoen's Church, adjoining William's own.

He was sent back to Ireland as a justice of the Court of King's Bench (Ireland) in 1610. He was an extra justice, appointed to help clear the large backlog of work which had built up (King's Bench was normally the busiest of the Irish Royal Courts, though the Crown generally regarded the Court of Exchequer (Ireland) as more important), and in the hope that, unlike some of his colleagues, he would be willing to go on assize (in the event he proved a diligent assize judge and won praise for his erudition and good service to the Crown). He was quickly made fourth justice of the King's Bench, with an assurance of becoming second justice in due course. A fresh patent of appointment was issued to him in 1615, presumably to confirm his status as a permanent judge.

He attended several sessions of the Parliament of Ireland of 1613–15, to act as legal adviser to the Irish House of Lords, as was customary for High Court judges at the time (Sir John Elliott, Baron of the Exchequer, attended these sessions in the same capacity).

He was knighted by the Lord Deputy of Ireland in 1619, and granted a coat of arms. He joined the King's Inns and was its Treasurer in 1620–21. He died in 1623, and was remembered as a learned and upright judge.

== The Sparke Memorial ==
He married firstly Elizabeth Hales, and secondly Mary Bryce or Brice, daughter of John Bryce, Mayor of Dublin 1605–6, and widow of John Hoey, Sergeant-at-arms in Ireland, and of Roger Downton.

It was Mary who erected the memorial to William, which can still be seen in the North Nave of St Audoen's Church, Cornmarket, Dublin. The memorial features a pediment and Corinthian columns; Mary is shown kneeling beside William. Other figures on the memorial represent Mary's first husband John Hoey and her parents, John Bryce and Katherine Sedgrave. A memorial to Joan Sparke, who was probably William's sister, and her husband Stephen Sedgrave stands side by side with Sparke Memorial.

== Sources ==
- Ball, F. Elrington The Judges in Ireland 1221-1921 London John Murray 1926
- Casey, Christine Dublin: the City Within the Grand and Royal Canals Yale University Press 2005
- Haydn, Joseph Book of Dignities London Longman Green Brown and Longmans 1851
- Kenny, Colum Kings Inns and the Kingdom of Ireland Dublin Irish Academic Press 1992
- Smyth, Constantine Joseph Chronicle of the Law Officers of Ireland London Butterworths 1839
