= Saint Anne's Guild =

Saint Anne's Guild (also spelt gild) was a medieval religious guild in Dublin, Ireland. It is noteworthy among such guilds for the considerable documentary evidence extant and for having survived as a Roman Catholic lay association until the eighteenth century.

== Origin ==
Father Myles Ronan, in his essay 'Dublin Medieval guilds', found in The Irish Ecclesiastical Record, Volume XXVI, July to December 1925, states:

…Occasionally money was left by deed for prayers (evidently meaning Masses) for the donor. One such deed tells how in 1478 Sir Robert Dowdall, in his lifetime, bestowed on St. Ann's guild of St. Audoen's Church, Dublin, a gift of 100 marks, to be put out at interest, used in merchandise at a profit, or invested in the purchase of land in the country; the yearly income derived to be devoted to the support of two priests, who were to sing and pray for him in St. Audoen's. After his death, the guild was to see to such priests keeping his mind on the anniversary of his death…

The guilds filled gaps in the social fabric not provided for by the systems of agricultural life, military defence or the Church. Guilds were unmentioned in Ireland before the Norman Conquest of 1169–71. To devote money to education or religion, the Irish nobility had to obtain permission from the English Crown. Guilds fell into two classes: social-religious, and Dublin trade guilds. The latter were either merchant guilds and craft guilds. Although both classes were present in the thirteenth century, they abounded in the period between the fourteenth and the sixteenth century. Many were set up shortly before the Reformation. They received royal charters that enabled them to hold property and devote some of it to the upkeep of a chapel and chaplain. This was a corporate imitation of the foundation of the chantry, which was made by private and wealthy individuals. On the religious side, the two classes of guilds had much in common.

From the Middle Ages the bakers' guild of Dublin was devoted to St. Anne, and represented her story at Mystery plays and during the triennial "Walking the Franchises" march around the city's limits. In 1528 the bakers represented Ceres at the Corpus Christi play for variety. After the Reformation in Ireland (1533–70) members of trade guilds such as the bakers had to join the Church of Ireland. They sent four legislators to the former Dublin Corporation, which divided the purely religious guild that was mostly Roman Catholic from the trade guild that had to become Protestant. Into the 1700s the bakers were always described as the "Guild of St. Anne". St. Ann's Church, Dawson Street (founded in 1720) still provides free loaves of bread on a "bread shelf" for hungry Dubliners that are given daily by the city's bakers.

In religious matters, the medieval trade and religious guilds had many things in common, but their primary purposes were distinct. Religious Guilds were fraternities of lay men and women, formed in many parishes for exclusively religious purposes. The only known guilds in the Dublin diocese were St. Anne's, in the church of St. Audoen; St. Sythe in the church of St. Michan; Corpus Christi, in St. Michael's on the Hill; St. George's, in George's Lane; St. Mary's in Balrothery; St. Mary's, at Mulhuddart; St. Canice's, at Hollywood, North Dublin, and St. John the Baptist's, in St. John's Church, Fishamble Street. Records of only St. Anne's and a few St. George's survive.

== Records/deeds ==
St. Anne's records form a portion of what is known as the 'Halliday Collection' in the Royal Irish Academy. Among the 160 extant deeds, one is numbered 831, indicating that many more once were. No other extant deed has a number greater than 600. A volume of abstracts of 841 documents was made in 1772 by James Goddard, clerk of the guild, among the Gilbert MSS.

The guild acquired extensive property in the city and county of Dublin and elsewhere. Although the guild was not founded until 1430, some of the title deeds of its subsequently acquired property extend as far back as 1285, and continue until 1740. The fate of the rest of the records is unknown. After the Reformation it became safer to conceal or destroy incriminating documents, because of inquiries by the Established Church and Government. It had been suspected that the trusts impressed on the guild were not carried out.

Lancelot Bulkeley, Church of Ireland Archbishop of Dublin, may have preserved the deeds in the academy. James I and Charles I tried to investigate the guild and its alleged, illegal procedures. The eagerness of Wentworth, Earl of Strafford, a minister of Charles I, in searching into the affairs of the fraternity may have hastened his end.

== St. Anne's Chapel ==
The devotion in Dublin became so popular that in a Provincial Council on 21 March 1352, under Archbishop de St. Paul, 26 July festival of St. Anne was ordered to be celebrated as a double, and the people to refrain from labour and attend their parish churches. Thus it became a holiday of obligation, along with the festivals of the Conception of the Blessed Virgin Mary, the Translation of Thomas Becket, and St. Katherine who was a virgin and martyr. It was further ordered that curates, on pain of excommunication, if they performed not the proper services on these days, were to procure them within six months. On St. Anne's Day, the service for St. Mary Magdalene was to be used mutatis mutandis. When the religious guild was to be established in 1430 in St. Audoen's, it was natural to find its patron in St. Anne.

In 1430 Henry VI, by letters patent dated 16 December, with the assent of Richard Talbot, Archbishop of Dublin and Justiciar of Ireland, granted licence to found a chantry in St Audoen's Church and to endow a chapel and guild.

The guild was to support six chantry priests, one to celebrate in a chapel that was to be built and dedicated to St. Anne, one in the Lady Chapel, and one at each of the four altars above named, for the souls of the king, founders, and brethren, etc., and it was allowed to receive income up to 100 marks (£66 13s. 4d. equivalent to about £1,000 before 1939) yearly for their maintenance.

St. Anne's Chapel was erected at the south side of the nave, running parallel to it as far as the chancel. The south wall was taken down, and six new pillars formed five bays, causing the chapel to become the south aisle of the church. Later, this aisle was continued eastwards by the erection of the Portlester Chapel, and forming a church of 'two aisles'.

Unfortunately, no other records of the other religious guilds survive, with the exception of the original charters of St. Sythe's and St. George's.

== Procedures ==
Each of the six chaplains of this guild had an altar or chapel assigned to him on appointment, where he celebrated daily and served in the choir. It would seem that even on 'feryall' days, there was a Missa Cantata, the Mary Mass, at which they were bound to assist, and on Fridays at the Jesus Mass. They were also bound to assist at all services on principal feasts and holidays.

They had the assistance of the two clerks attached to the church, one of whom sang and played at the organs, at all those services, for which he received a special annuity of £8 (£120 before 1939), and half of the profit of the 'bells and church cake'. The other clerk was appointed to assist the chaplains by singing and reading in choir daily at divine service at a salary of 7 marks. Every second week he caused fire and water to be brought, rang the bells, and accompanied the parish priest or curate in visiting the sick. He was granted the other half profit of the church cake, bells and 'mind' money.

Separate chambers were allotted to the chantry priests, and the average yearly salary pertaining to their office appears to have been 8 marks (£80 before 1939). The senior clerk received about £40 (before 1939) a year more than any of the chaplains. Board was provided —'a table honestly found, according to the degree of a priest'.

They had life tenure, 'as well in sickness as in health, as far forth as God would give grace and bodily health'. The guild paid for all accoutrements necessary for singing Mass—bread, wine, wax, chalice, Mass-book, vestments, etc., while the priests agreed to sing at all divine services, so far as their learning and 'conyng' extended, unless special leave was granted, and not to relinquish their posts except on promotion to benefices.

=== Housing ===
Chambers were allotted in houses near the church. The 'chamber of St. Mary's chaplain', was mentioned as standing by the stile at the corner of Audoen's Lane and Cornmarket. In 1534 they moved into a single building, which became known as the college. This had been known as Blakeney's Inns, with turret and garden. James Blakeney conveyed it to the guild. It occupied the site on which the present Catholic St. Audoen's now stands.

Special apartments were assigned to each chaplain, and were known as the 'second tower of Blakeney's Inns', the 'fourth chamber', etc.. The guild paid for repair and maintenance. The chaplains planted hedges around the college, constructed buildings, and built 'St. Anne's Workhouse', which was evidently a special workshop for the men employed by the guild in connection with its property in the neighbourhood.

The presence of a school was suggested by Joan Douce' will (381) which left 2s. to the four scholars in St. Audoen's church, and a person named Codde bequeathed 4 marks for a two-year exhibition in the schools. These may have been for the choristers attached to the church.

=== Commerce ===
The guild accumulated property between 1430 and 1558, through bequests and donations. Houses, rents and lands were deeded to it, many of which remain in the guild collection.

The guild sometimes carried on a kind of co-operation in commerce. One deed (No. 1 in Calendar) Robert Dovedall, a knight, gave 100 marks to be disposed of in merchandise, iron and salt being mentioned as the probable commodities.

The trustees were to ensure security for the trust. Out of every 12d. increase or yearly profit on the 100 marks' over and above the 1½d., went to the merchant in charge of the commodities for the time being. The goods were loaned to some guild members. The grantor's cousins or allies were to receive preference for the loan, provided they gave the usual collateral. Recipients paid interest on the value. But the master and wardens could choose to invest the money in lands in a 'good part of the country'. This lending system was also found in the religious guild of St. Mary at Cambridge. These arrangements prefigured more recent cooperative and tontine societies, as well as Bona Mors associations.

=== Rituals ===
The handling of a death was of supreme importance. Each departed villager received special remembrance on the 'mind' or anniversary day. A book of obituaries was probably kept, as in the case of Christ Church. St. Anne's recorded special deeds drawn up by the merchants and others, who could afford the expense, by which the donor bestowed on the guild certain premises in the city, or outside, on condition that the priests maintained on St. Anne's 'Rent' should, yearly, in St. Audoen's, on a certain Sunday, observe same, with solemn Mass, by plainsong, or, as it is again called, Requiem Mass by note, with five 'pryketts' (torches) of wax burning. And on the Saturday previous, the Dirige was to be sung, with the same wax lights, and, according to the 'old laudable custom', the city bellman (polictor) was to go to the old station-places appointed in the city to 'bid' a Pater Noster and Ave for the said deceased. Some parishioners were buried in one of the chantry chapels, beneath the groundsill. It does not appear that every member had this right. Benefactors, funders if special chantry priests and guild chaplains left specific directions as to which chapel—St. Clare, St. Mary, etc.—they wished to be buried in.

== Investigations ==
Guilds became numerous and collectively important in England. They were so much feared as wealthy agencies supporting 'superstitious uses' that in the last year of Henry VIII and the first year of Edward VI two Acts were passed which suppressed them all, and appropriated their property to the Crown. The trade guilds had so much in common with the religious guilds that they were included in the inquiry which preceded the Acts; but they escaped the religious guilds' fate because they were clearly mercantile and trade companies. No record explains the fate of Dublin's religious guilds, although abundant records show that St. Anne's guild continued at least until 1740. It thrived until 1611, when the Crown, the Irish Council, other public bodies and private individuals began to be directed against it. The Attorney-General required the master and wardens to justify the liberties taken in the chapel. In response, they presented their charter and their history. The Attorney-General replied that such a plea was not sufficient to protect their assets from the King, but did not confiscate their property.

In 1634 Thomas Lowe attempted to compel the guild to devote its income to the Church. The now-reformed religion ended the need for a chantry, with priests to celebrate for the souls of the founders and brethren. Love affirmed that the fraternity was bound to support a chanting minister (himself) and six vicars. He evaded the question of Mass, which was a fundamental object of the guild. However, 'a chanting minister and six vicars' were not contemplated in the charter, and no revision of the charter had been made. The guild pleaded that its entire revenue was only £74 14s. yearly, which was expended on the parson, organist, choristers, and singers. However, the commission reported that the annual income amounted to £289 1s. 7d. Again the question was postponed. The commission that had been appointed consisted of John Bramhall, Bishop of Derry, Sir James Ware, and two others. The inquiries were to be preliminary to order for the establishment of six 'priests' who were to be in possession of the college house, which had been granted for other uses for years. Lowe advocated that the college and funds be restored, new brethren be appointed, and a principal room in the college be reserved for guild meetings and as a place to keep its muniments. From the account of the transaction collected by Sir James Ware:

"The Foundation of St. Anne’s Guild in Dublin: with the Escheats of that Fraternity found out. King Henry the Sixth granted a Patent for the Fraternity of St. Anne's Guild, bearing the date of the sixteenth of December, in the ninth year of his reign. This Fraternity continued, notwithstanding the dissolution of Abbeys, Priories, and other Religious Houses, in King Henry the Eighth's reign: consisting of a body corporate, and a master, in the reign of Queen Elizabeth, not being questioned until, or about, the year of our Lord 1634. Upon the sixteenth of February 1634: Thomas Lee, Preacher of the Gospel of Jesus Christ, and Vicar of both Cathedrals in Dublin, brought John Edmonds, an attorney in Dublin, unto Lancelot Buckeley, Archbishop of the same, who delivered unto him the said Archbishop a bundle of Papers, and an old Rent Roll Book concerning the Guild of St. Ann, by St. Audoen’s Church in Dublin, amongst which Papers was a Parchment bull bearing date the third year of Pope Pius Quintus [1569], which Bull Thomas Lee translated as followeth:-

"PIUS QUINTUS, Servant of the Servants of God, etc. To all our beloved Brethren and Sons of the Catholique Mother Church of Rome, now dwelling or inhabiting within the Dominions of England and Ireland, greeting: We will and command yee the Trustees, Masters, Overseers and Brethren of our Hospitals, Guilds, and other of our Religious Convents within those Dominions of England and Ireland, for to set, let, and to make sale of all our said sacred Lands, Tenements, and Hereditaments, of this kind or nature unto none, saving unto those of the true Antient and Apostolic Faith, viz., of the Mother Church of the blessed Apostle of St. Peter of the See of Rome, now under our jurisdiction, and owing ours and our successors supremacy. Further, we will and command ye to observe this our Mandate, especially that those said lands, tenements, and hereditaments might be, and remain in the custody of Catholicks, and not of Hereticks, in case of our happy Restoration unto all our Ecclesiastical Livings and Privileges due unto the holy See of St. Peters of Rome. We further taking into our Sacred consideration, the compulsions and slaveries of Catholicks living under Heretical Powers, paying Taxes, Tythes, and Pence unto Heretical Clergies, contrary to our Will and Commands. We, therefore, absolve ye, until ye by the Prayers, Tears, and Assistance of the Mother Church be redeemed and freed. Provided that our Mandates be fulfilled always by ye and your posterities, viz., To pay unto all such Archbishops, Bishops, Abbots, Priors, Deans or other Sacred Orders, shewing commission from Us, or from our Vicars, such Tythes, Sums, and Perquisits that ye can spare, and is conscionable, as testimonies of your due reverence unto Us, and the holy Mother Church of St. Peters at Rome. Also to have a Parish Prriest in every Parish, he to be of the Catholick Faith, and to pay unto them their just Tythes and Perquisits, as formerly: So ye observing these our Mandates and Precepts, we sprinkle our Benediction on ye and your children, with the blessing of the Holy Undivided Trinity, of the Blessed Virgin Mary, the Mother of God, of the Heavenly Host of Archangels, Angels, Patriarchs, Prophets, Apostles, Saints, and Holy Martyrs. Amen. From St. Peters at Rome, 4th Ide May, anno ter Pontivic. PIUS QUINTUS

"The Archbishop delivering up these papers unto Thomas, Lord Viscount Wentworth, then Lord Deputy of this kingdom, his Lordship issued out a Commission under the Great Seal, nominating John Lord, Bishop of Derry, Sir James Ware, Knight, John Atherton, Doctor in Divinity, and Richard Fitzgerald, Esq., for to inspect into the Records touching the said Guild, the commission beareth date the eleventh of February undecimo anno Caroli Regis, etc.

3 March 1636. John Edmond declared before the Archbishop of Dublin, John, Bishop of Derry, and Sir James Ware, Knight, that these papers were found amongst several papers sometimes belonging unto Richard and Christopher Fagan, who had been formerly Alderman and Mayor of the City of Dublin: who held part of the houses and lands of St. Ann’s Guild.

Search being made upon this commission, by the Commissioners therein named, they returned a large discovery of divers houses within the City of [Dublin], also without the walls thereof: And likewise several towns and farms in the counties of Dublin and [Meath], which return bears date upon 20 June 1637, several parcels since were discovered, but all lay dormant since the recal of Thomas Wentworth Earl of Strafford from the Government of Ireland.

These four things following hastened this loyal Peer's death, viz.: His reforming of Ireland unto our English station; the procuring of subsidies by a Parliament held at Dublin during his Government; the setting up the Star-Chamber; and his eagerness in searching into this Guild. All combined and contrived chiefly by the Roman Catholicks party of this kingdom, who were glad to get some persons of quality to be their leaders, whom this peer had chastised during his government of this kingdom.

Three Aldermen (viz., Carroll, James, and Malone) of Dublin, Brethren and Tenants of the said Guild, were great enemies unto this noble peer.

The names of the Brethren and Tenants of this Guild when the Commission was granted as aforesaid, viz. :- Sir Richard Brown, Knight; Patrick Brown; Plunket, Alderman; Thomas Ball, Edward Fyan, Clement Ash, Christ. White, Alderman; Patrick Bath, John Harrison, Robert Caddoll, John Brice, Lymrick Nottingham, Esq.; George Forster, Sir Phil. Percival, Knight; John Ball, John, the Son of Alderman Kennedy; Clement Usher, William Purcell, Robert Malone, Walter Kenedy, Alderman; Dame FitzWilliams, widow; Andrew Clerk, Alderman; Sir Robert Dixon, Knight; William Malone, Alderman; Nich. Stephens, Alderman; Edward James, Alderman; James Mey, Christopher Hancock, Elliner Terrel, now with Alderman Pallace; Robert Usher of Cromlin; William Nangle, Baron of the Navin in Com. Mid.; Christ. Barnewell.

All were specified in the said return, and answer unto the above commission of inspection: several others hold parcels of the above Guild not yet discovered or returned."

The result of this commission is unknown.

The list of "Brethren and Tenants" included well-connected Protestants such as Bishop Robert Ussher, who was the prebendary of St Audeons from 1617, Sir Philip Perceval, an English-born official in Dublin Castle, and Sir Robert Dixon, Lord Mayor of Dublin in 1633–34 and father-in-law of the future Lord Chancellor Maurice Eustace.

From 1642 to 1644, the affairs of the guild were the subject of inquiry by the Irish House of Commons.

From 1558 onwards, the status of the guild's property is unknown. The Bull of St. Pius V was a natural warning to preserve Roman Catholic property during the troubled times. It seems extraordinary that the guild retained its property The master and wardens could not appoint priests to the chantry, which had reformed itself. The college premises fell into ruin. Under James I some effort was made to trace the property, and the charters were brought into Court, to no avail. Wentworth began the real searching. It is possible that the property remained mostly in Roman Catholic hands, and that the revenues were devoted to St. Audoen's. The admission that from 1638 to 1681 nearly all the masters and wardens were of the Established Church would indicate that before 1638 that was not the case. There is no doubt, however, that the insurrection of 1641 began the downfall of Roman Catholic domination of the guild. Some of the principal members in 1682 were Catholics. In that year, after the storm created by the Titus Oates 'Popish Plot', the imprisonment and death of Peter Talbot, Archbishop of Dublin (1680) and execution of Oliver Plunket (1681), the Church tried again to appropriate the guild's property.

=== Chancery Bill of 1682 ===
The most important proceedings occurred on 27 March 1682. The prebendary and churchwardens of St. Audoen's filed a Bill in Chancery against the guild's master and wardens. As in Lowe's case, the plaintiffs assumed that its revenues, should be used solely for St. Audoen's Church and parish (see: Purpose trust). The bill cited the charter and added that its annual revenues now amounted to £2,500; and alleged a gross breach of trust. It stated that the reason the guild had continued its illegal acts was that before 1641 most members were Roman Catholics; that since that year the guild had been reconstructed, church services properly maintained, and the church fabric repaired. But since the 1641 Rebellion, they asserted, Roman Catholic masters and wardens were elected, who distributed the revenues among popish priests and the members of the fraternity, and allowed the ruin of the college. These Catholic brethren had concealed the nature and true value of the revenues. The Protestant plaintiffs, therefore, sought to compel the Catholic defendants to reveal the extent of guild property and return the guild to its original purposes.

On 16 June 1682, the defendants provided a general history of the guild from about 1620, and denied that they or their predecessors were bound to support St. Audoen's. It submitted a list of masters and wardens from 1638 showing that its principal officers were nearly all up to 1681 Protestants. Again, the guild was not punished. In 1684 a vestry meeting at St. Audoen's decided to submit the case to the Lord Chancellor (Michael Boyle, (Church of Ireland Archbishop of Armagh) for arbitration. The fraternity evaded this reference to the Archbishop, and the matter again fell through.

== Modern adaptation ==
A group of Roman Catholics attending the Traditional Latin Mass in St. Audoen's Roman Catholic Church formed a branch of the Sodality of Our Lady called 'Saint Anne's Guild' in May 2001.
