= Keyser's Lane =

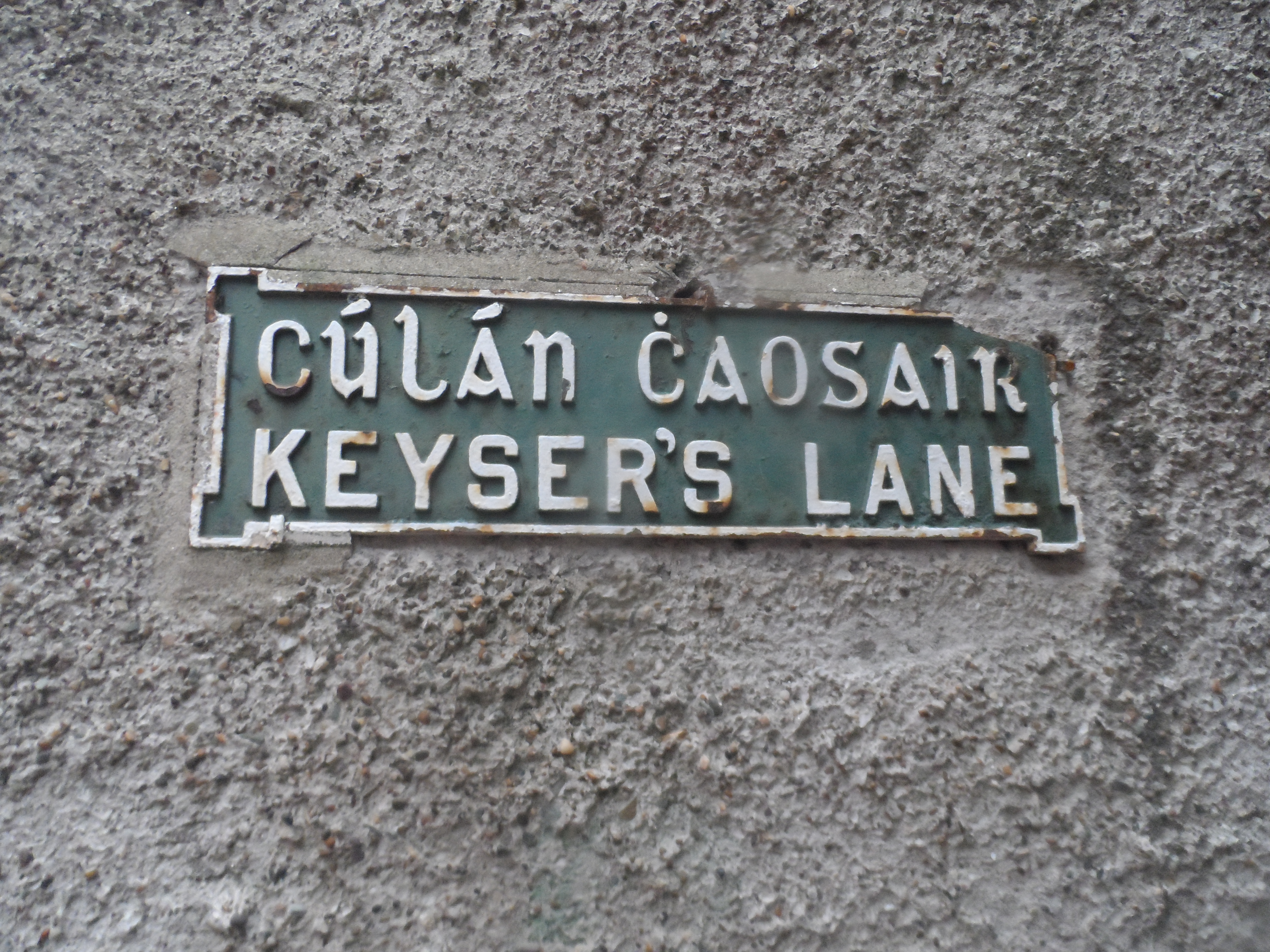
Street sign in Wexford

Keyser's Lane (or Keyser's Hill, Kezer's Lane, Keizer Street, Keyzer-street) is a street name found in several former Viking towns in Ireland.

The name generally applies to a street which runs from the medieval town centre down to the quays or harbour, and is believed to derive from Old Norse keisa, meaning "bend", perhaps a reference to the steep slope of the hill or the curve of the river. Holinshed's Chronicles (1575) mentions that it is an ancient name of uncertain origin. Other sources give "lane to the quays" or "ship wharf" as its meaning; however, "quay" is a Celtic/French word, not Norse.

== Locations ==
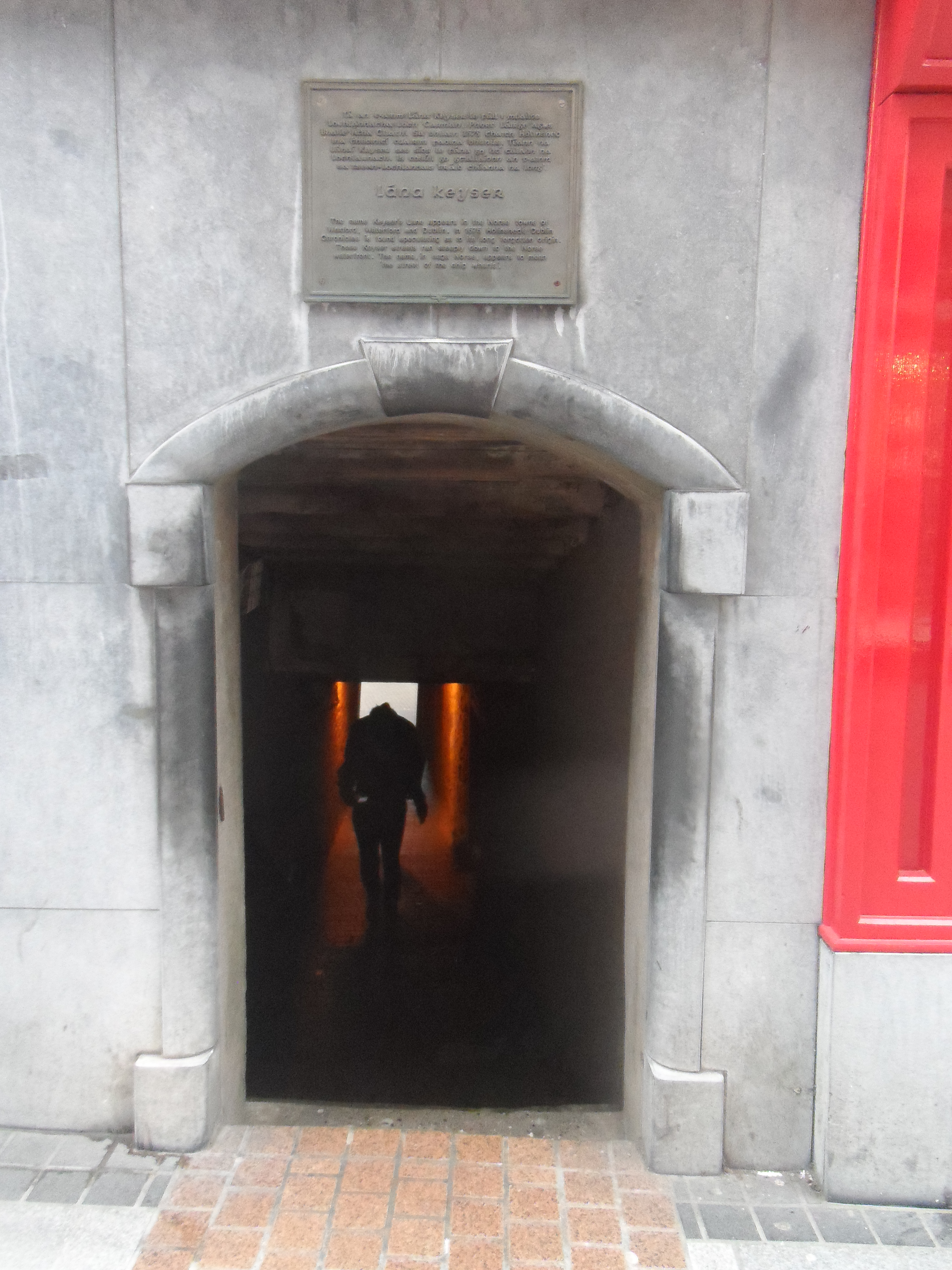
Entrance to Keyser's Lane, Wexford

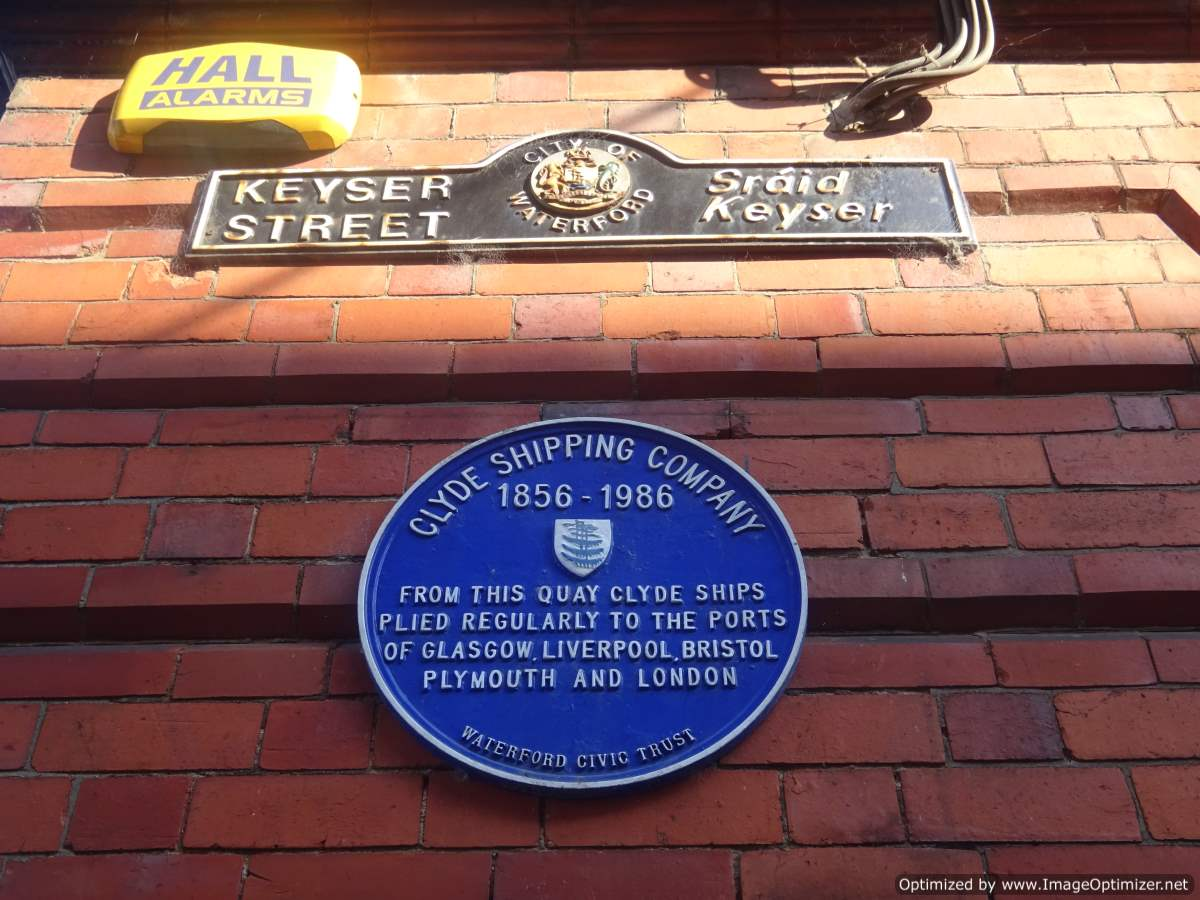
Sign on Keyser Street, Waterford

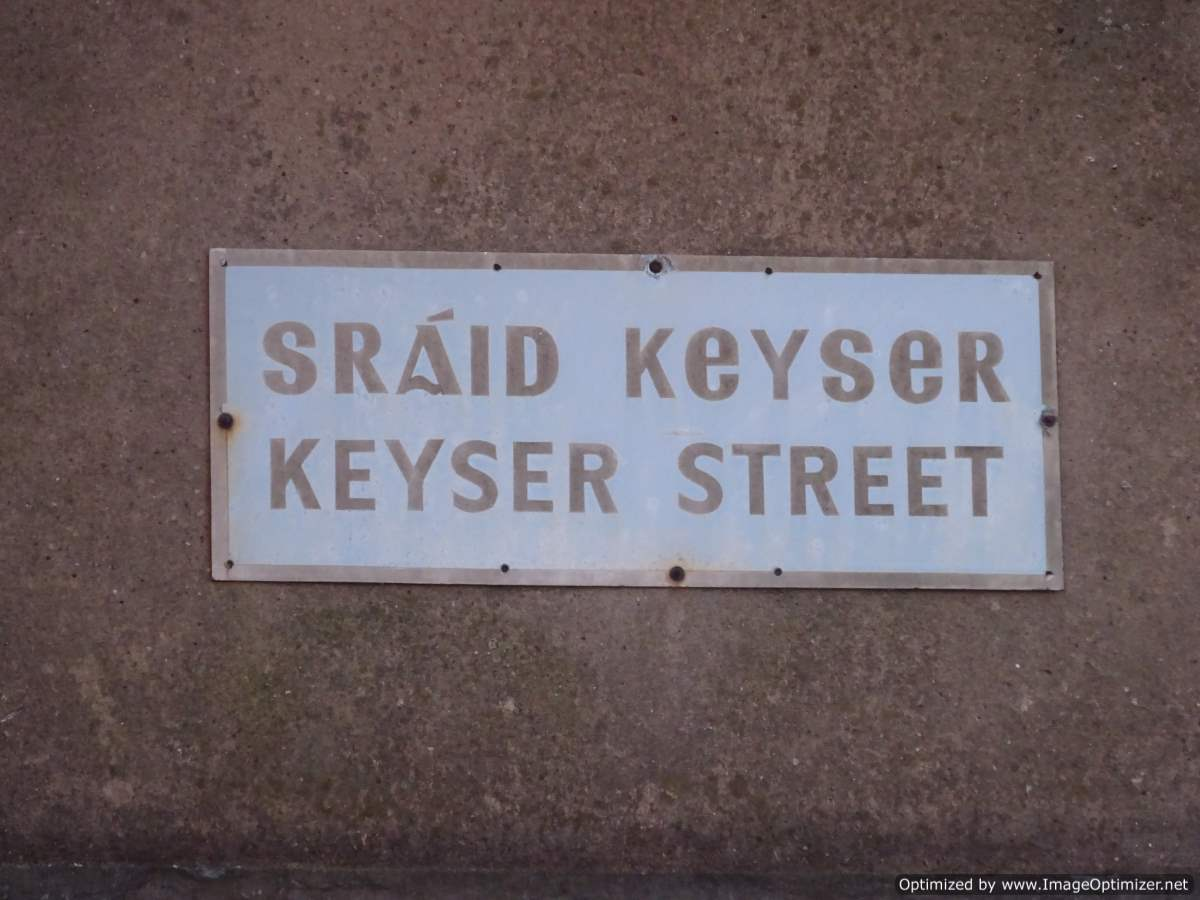
Sign in Waterford

- Cork: Keyser's Hill (also called Keyser's Lane) is the name of a lane running from Proby's Quay up to Elizabeth Fort, on the south bank of the south branch of the Lee.
- Drogheda: Keyser's Lane (also spelled Kezer's Lane, today called "Highlanes") connects Bachelors Lane with St Laurence's Street.
- Dublin: Keyser's Lane was located in The Liberties and connected Cook Street to Newgate Street (today called Cornmarket). It is named Kaysars Lane on John Speed's Map of Dublin (1610). In the 19th century it was nicknamed "Kissarse Lane," apparently because the stones were slippery when wet and pedestrians sometimes fell on their bottoms.
- Dublin: Cazer's Lane is detailed on John Rocque's map of 1756 linking up Frenchman's Lane with the North Strand near the location of the Custom House.
- Waterford: Keyser Street, formerly called Keyser's Lane, Keizer Street or Keyzer-street, connects High Street to the quays.
- Wexford: Keyser's Lane in Wexford is well-preserved and runs from High Street to Crescent Quay. It is entered via an archway and is walled and roofed.
