= Priory of All Hallows =

Medieval monastic priory in Dublin, Ireland

The Priory of All Hallows (or Priory of All Saints) was an Augustinian monastic foundation just outside of the walls of Dublin, Ireland. It was demolished by King Henry VIII and in 1592, Trinity College Dublin was established in its place by Queen Elizabeth I.

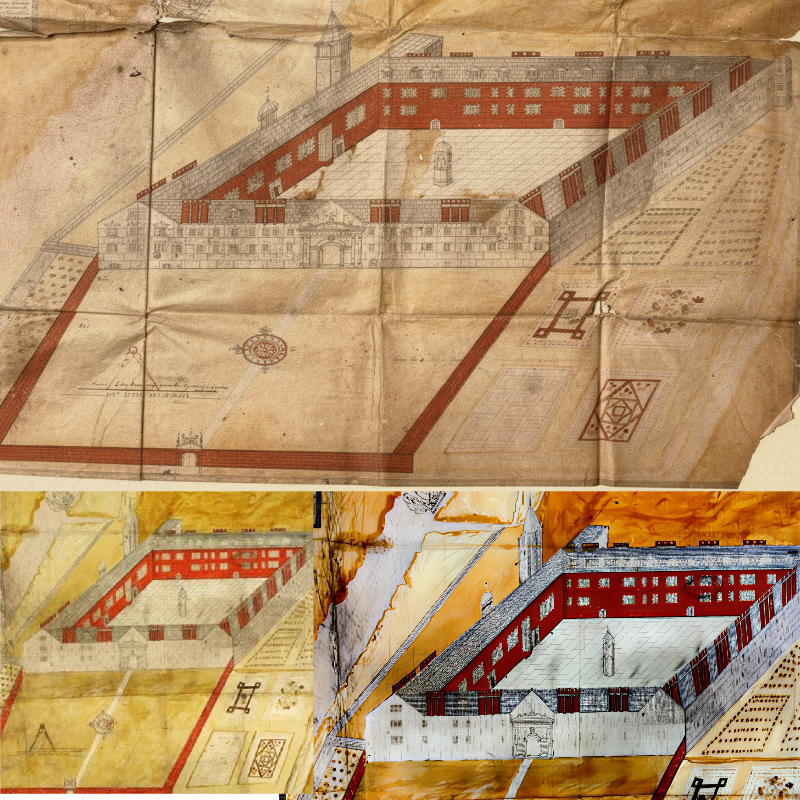
Medieval drawing of the Priory of All Hallows in Dublin, circa 1590.

== History ==
=== Priory ===
All Hallows was founded in 1166 by Diarmait Mac Murchada shortly before his deposition as King of Leinster. It was situated east of the walled city in an area known as "Hoggin Green" or "Hogges Green" or "Le Hogges". It was an Araosian (Augustinian) foundation, with canons regular. The priory was one of the most important, and over time became one of the wealthiest, religious establishments in the vicinity of Dublin, along with the Priory of St John the Baptist (Thomas Street), the Priory of the Holy Trinity and St. Mary's Abbey, Dublin (as well as the more remote foundations such as Grace Dieu Abbey).

Four years after founding the priory, Mac Murchada, by then restored to his lands by his Cambro-Norman allies, landed an invasion at the Steine and captured the walled city from the ruling Hiberno-Norse dynasty. The priory survived the invasion and a period of prosperity followed.

In 1240, grants from the parish of Taghadoe enlarged the priory, resulting in the Papal confirmation of the priory in 1276, some of which came with serfs attached to the land. Throughout the remainder of the 13th century and most of the 14th, some of the property was subject to attack, and the remoter estates were difficult to control. The Prior often complained of poverty and due to the occupation of its lands and distraction of its buildings, the priory and related convent fell into hard times, causing the Archbishop of Dublin to relax the proxies they were required to pay.

In 1367, the passing of the Statutes of Kilkenny forbade the rulers of religious houses from receiving any Irish people to their profession under penalty of confiscation of their temporalities; in the years following, Richard II issued a writ to the priory ordering the obeisance of the statute. Subsequently in 1380, the Parliament of the Pale enacted that "no mere Irishman should make his profession in the Priory of All Hallows". The writ was never repealed, however, it seems that it was not long obeyed; a number of the subsequent abbots and church officers have Irish names.

After the campaign of 1394 by Richard II, the prior was granted a charter stating "We concede and confirm for ever to have and to hole him and his successors, all the aforementioned manors, lands, tenements, rents, services, and other possessions, spiritual and temporal, together with liberties, franchises, privileges, and customs which they and their predecessors were accustomed as of right and use to enjoy". There appears to have been a fire that destroyed all previous muniments, so not much else is known.

As was common for religious houses at the time, the Priory often lodged visitors and deputies from the king. In 1488, Sir Richard Edgcumbe stayed at the priory in his efforts to secure oaths of allegiance to Henry VII in the face of Lambert Simnel’s claim to the English throne. In the Priory he conducted interviews with the Earl of Kildare.

In 1489 an Act of Parliament exempted the Priory of All Hallows from any subsidies and taxes, and confirmed the land grants made to All Hallows by Edward IV earlier in the century.

As part of the Reformation in Ireland, the Crown dissolved the priory. The chapter, under Walter Hancocke, met for the last time on 16 November 1538, and sent the seal of the house to the Crown. The inmates were expelled from the cloisters, and the prior and other officials were granted an annuity of £40 on which to live.

On 4 February 1539, the buildings and lands were granted, for a Crown head rent of 4 pounds, 3 shillings and a halfpenny, to the mayor and corporation of Dublin on behalf of the citizens. On 7 August 1539, the priory was leased to Nicholas Stanyhurst and Walter Forester for £100.

The demolition of the old buildings of the priory, which had begun in 1539, was finally completed around 1593, with the spire being the only remaining structure from the original Priory of All Hallows.

=== Trinity College ===
Archbishop Loftus asked the Mayor of Dublin to grant the All Hallows lands, then generating a rent of only 20 pounds a year for the city, for the use of a college and when this was done, he employed Henry Ussher to appeal to Elizabeth I of England for a charter for a college and a licence for the land, which was granted in December 1591. This new foundation became Trinity College, Dublin of which Archbishop Loftus became first Provost.

== Natural features ==
Two natural features made the site an important space in both the Viking and Hiberno-Norse periods: the River Steyne and the landing stage of the River Liffey. The Steyne or Stein ran along the western edge of the priory lands. One of two bridges over the small river was located where the current main entrance to Trinity College now stands. A watermill and associated pond lay nearby. The landing stage, at a place called the "Long stone" of the Steine, was located north of the priory near the present day Pearse Street Garda Station.

== Artefacts ==
A tile from the original priory is in a collection of the Library of Trinity College, Dublin.

== External sources ==
- Warburton, Whitelaw and Walsh, "History of the City of Dublin, etc." London, Cadell & Davies, 1818, especially "The Priory of All-Hallows, All-Saints" (pp. 353–357)

== See also ==
- List of monastic houses in County Dublin
- Augustinian Friary of the Most Holy Trinity, Dublin
- St. Mary del Dam
