= St. Michael's Church, Dublin =

Former church in Dublin, Ireland

Coordinates: 53°20′35″N 06°16′17″W

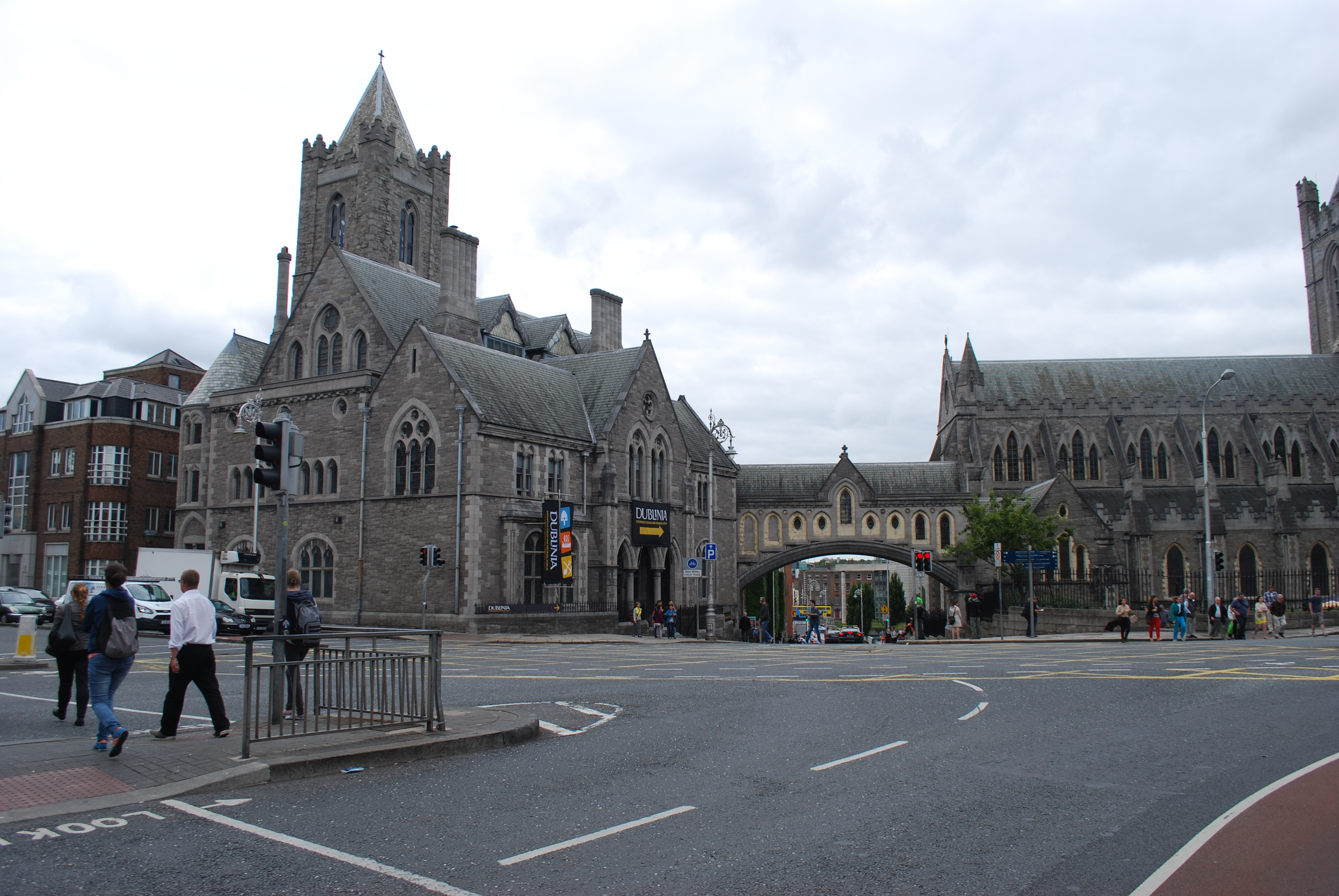
The Synod Hall of Christ Church Cathedral, Dublin. The tower of St. Michael's, all that now remains of the church, can be seen in the middle of the building.

St. Michael's Church was a Roman Catholic and later Church of Ireland church which was located in High Street, Dublin, Ireland.

== The church ==
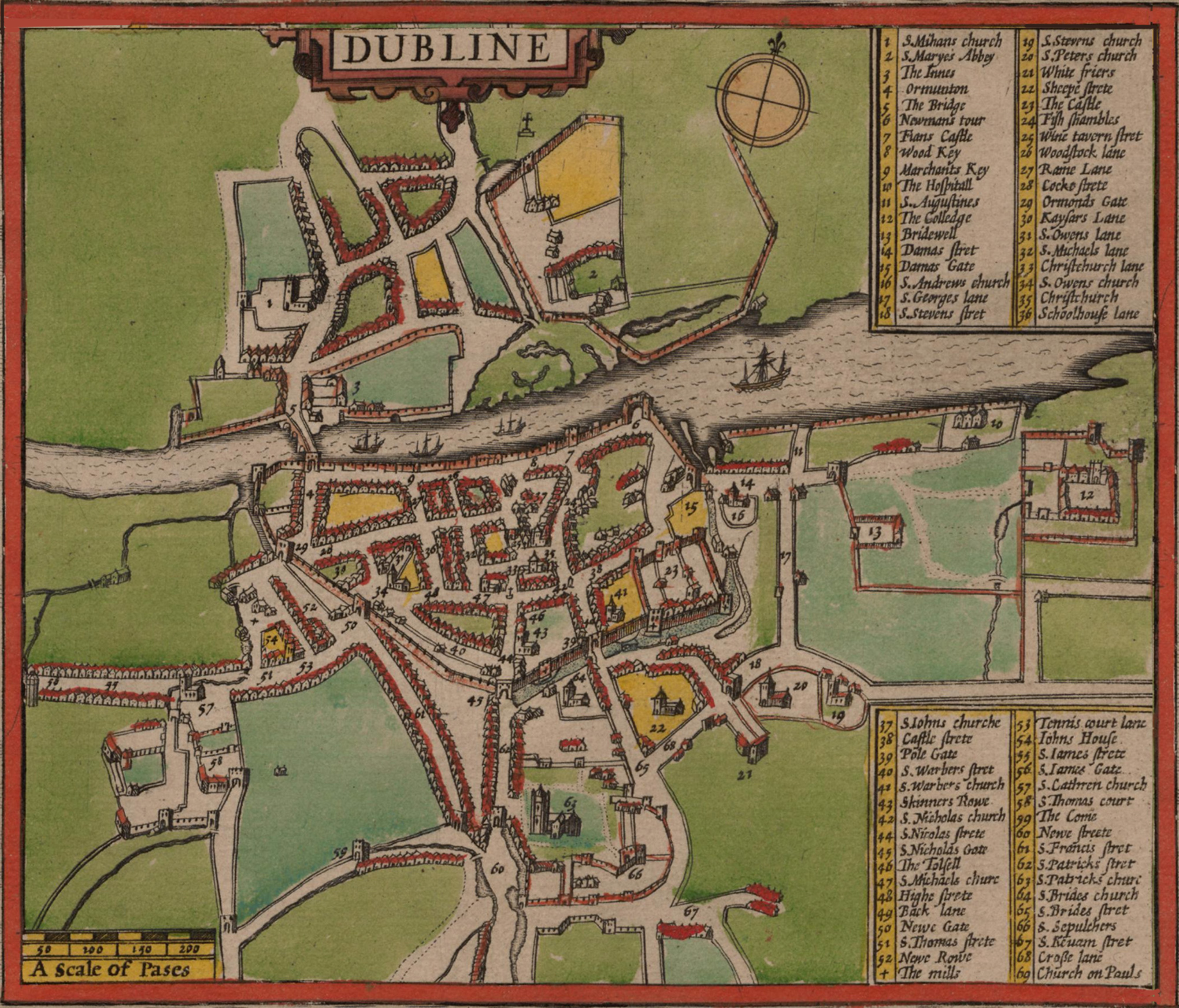
Map (reprinted 1896) showing the layout of Dublin in 1610. St. Michael's church is no. 47, just across from Christ Church (no. 35)

A chapel was originally erected by Donat, Archbishop of Dublin, in 1076, which was converted into a parish church by Archbishop Richard Talbot in 1417. It was used by the Corporation of Shoe-makers, a guild. It was situated in High Street, at the corner of Christ Church lane, immediately opposite the western end of the cathedral, where the former Synod Hall now stands. In 1554 St. Michael's was one of three Prebends in Christ Church set up by Archbishop Browne.

The church is annotated on John Speed's Map of Dublin (1610) as "S Michaels churc".

For a number of years, it fell into ruin, but was rebuilt in 1815, when Dr. Graves, Dean of Armagh, was Prebendary. It was mostly demolished with the exception of the tower by George Edmund Street later in the 19th century during his restoration of Christ Church Cathedral. The tower has been incorporated into the Synod Hall.

== The parish ==
The parish was one of the smallest in Dublin, covering just over 5 acres (2.0 ha). Around 1850 it contained 1,317 inhabitants.

== Notable parishioners ==
- Daniel Wytter (rector 1662–1664), who became Bishop of Dromore
- Gabriel Jacques Maturin (rector 1734–35)
- Edward Ledwich (rector 1749–1761, not the antiquary of the same name, who was born in 1739 across the road in Nicholas St.), who became Archdeacon of Kildare and Prebendary of Christ Church.
- Thomas Taylour, 1st Marquess of Headfort, founder of the Bective family, who worked with William Petty in compiling the Down Survey of Ireland, was interred here in 1682.
- Fielding family, ancestors to the Earls of Desmond. Ford Lambart, 5th Earl of Cavan, was interred here in 1772.

== References and sources ==
Notes

Sources

- Gilbert, John (1854). A History of the City of Dublin. Oxford: Oxford University.
- George Newenham Wright (2005). "An Historical Guide to the City of Dublin (1825)". Online book. Archived from the original on 31 October 2007.
