= Benjamin Parry =

Benjamin Parry (February 1634 – 4 October 1678) was Church of Ireland Bishop of Ossory from 27 January 1678 until his death later the same year.

== Life ==
Parry was born in February 1634 in Dublin and baptised on 12 March, the son of Edward Parry (Bishop of Killaloe) and Miss Price. His siblings were John Parry (bishop), his predecessor as Bishop of Ossory; Edward Parry; Robert Parry; Mary Parry who married John Bulkeley; and Elinor Parry who was a love and correspondent of John Locke and later married Richard Hawkshaw. Benjamin Parry was educated at Trinity College, Dublin and Jesus College, Oxford before becoming a Fellow of Corpus Christi College, Oxford in 1654. He was ordained, later becoming the prebendary of Knaresborough and a canon of York. he also served as rector of Hope, Flintshire, rector of Godington, Oxfordshire and rector of St Antholin's, London. Arthur Capell, 1st Earl of Essex, the Lord Lieutenant of Ireland, appointed him as one of his chaplains in 1672. In 1674, he became Dean of Ossory, becoming Dean of St Patrick's in 1675. After his brother John died (on 21 December 1677), Parry succeeded him as Bishop of Ossory, and was consecrated on 27 January 1678. He also succeeded his brother as rector of Llaniestyn, Anglesey and of St Andrew's, Dublin. However, he died within the year, on 4 October 1678 and is buried with his father and brother in the vestibule of St. Audoen's Church, Dublin.

== Descendants ==
Benjamin Parry married Elizabeth Barrington, the sister of Herbert Barrington. Their children were four sons and one daughter- George born c.1672, Benjamin, James who was baptised in St. Michan's Church, Dublin on 7 August 1674, Thomas who died about 26 March 1679 and Catherine who died about 10 April 1676 and who are both buried at St. Audeon’s Church, Dublin.

== Monument ==
The vestry book of St. Audeon’s Church, Dublin states at 16 April 1681 that in a recess on the northern side of the church door, a corner of the north-west part of the church (now the vestibule) was railed off with "a rail and banister," for the Parry family burial place. It measured 14 feet by 8 feet and a rent of forty shillings a year was due for it by the Parry family, which was split fifty-fifty between the Prebendary and Churchwardens of St. Audeons. It acquired the name of the "Bishop of Ossory's Chapel". Many generations of the Parrys were buried in this tomb, which, having become defaced by time, was, on the repair of the Church in 1848, surmounted with an inscribed white marble slab at the expense of Dr. John Parry's representatives, Dame Emma Elizabeth Puleston of Albrighton Hall, Shropshire, relict of Sir Richard Puleston, Bart., Anna Eleanora, Frances and Elizabeth Hawkshaw, daughters of Lieutenant Colonel John Stuart Hawshaw of Divernagh, County Armagh. The monument of the spot, which still exists, reads- “In memory of Edward Parry and his two sons John and Benjamin Parry, who were interred near this spot. Edward Parry, D.D., Pro-Vice-Chancellor of the University of Trinity College, Dublin, was consecrated Bishop of Killaloe, 28th March, 1647, and died of the plague in this city, July 20th, 1650. John Parry, D.D., was promoted to the Deanery of Christ’s Church, Dublin, Apl. 2, 1666; was consecrated Bishop of Ossory Apl. 22, 1672; and departed this life Dec. 21st 1677. Benjamin Parry DD was promoted to the Deanery of St Canices Kilkenny Feb. 19th 1673, to the Deanery of St. Patrick's Dublin Feb. 17th 1674, was consecrated Bishop of Ossory on the death of his brother John Parry and departed this life Oct. 4th 1678. On the repairing of this church AD 1848 by permission of the Rev. James Howie AM prebendary of the same. Dame Emma Elizabeth Puleston of Albrighton Hall, Shropshire relict of Sir Richard Puleston Bart and Anna, Eleanora, Frances, and Elizabeth Hawkshaw, daughters of the late Lieut Colene John Stewart Hawkshaw of Divernagh Co. Armach, caused this new monument to be erected in memory of the above named bishops. The said Sir Richard Puleston and Lieut. Colonel John Steward Hawkshaw having been Lineally descended from the above named Edward Parry. The monument underneath was the one originally erected by the said John Parry to the memory of his Father Edward Parry”
