= John Parry (bishop) =

Church of Ireland Bishop of Ossory (died 1677)

John Parry (died 1677) was Bishop of Ossory in the Church of Ireland from 1672 until his death.

== Life ==
Parry, the son of Edward Parry (Bishop of Killaloe) and Miss Price was born in Dublin and educated at Trinity College, Dublin. His siblings were Benjamin Parry who succeeded him as Bishop of Ossory; Edward Parry; Robert Parry; Mary Parry who married John Bulkeley; and Elinor Parry who was a love and correspondent of John Locke and later married Richard Hawkshaw. After moving to the University of Oxford, John Parry became a Fellow of Jesus College, Oxford in 1653, obtaining his MA in the same year. After being ordained, Parry became rector of Hope, Flintshire in 1660; his brother Benjamin succeeded him in this post in 1666. He was one of the chaplains of the Lord Lieutenant of Ireland, James Butler, 1st Duke of Ormonde, and on his return to Ireland obtained his BD and DD degrees from Trinity College, Dublin in 1661 and 1662 respectively. He was also appointed treasurer of Christ Church Cathedral, Dublin in 1661, prebendary of Bugthorpe, Yorkshire in 1662 and rector of St John of Jerusalem in the Diocese of Cork. He became Dean of Christ Church Cathedral, Dublin and precentor of St Patrick's Cathedral, Dublin, through the influence of Ormonde. He held these positions until his death. He was consecrated as Bishop of Ossory in 1672, and also appointed as rector of Llaniestyn, Anglesey. He was highly regarded as a bishop, helping to restore the cathedral and install new bells. John Parry married Constance Kennedy, the daughter of Richard Kennedy.

He died on 21 December 1677 and was buried on 26 December 1677 with his father and brother in the vestibule of St. Audoen's Church, Dublin.

== Monument ==
The vestry book of St. Audeon's Church, Dublin states at 16 April 1681 that in a recess on the northern side of the church door, a corner of the north-west part of the church (now the vestibule) was railed off with "a rail and banister," for the Parry family burial place. It measured 14 feet by 8 feet and a rent of forty shillings a year was due for it by the Parry family, which was split fifty-fifty between the Prebendary and Churchwardens of St. Audeons. It acquired the name of the "Bishop of Ossory's Chapel". Many generations of the Parrys were buried in this tomb, which, having become defaced by time, was, on the repair of the Church in 1848, surmounted with an inscribed white marble slab at the expense of Dr. John Parry's representatives, Dame Emma Elizabeth Puleston of Albrighton Hall, Shropshire, relict of Sir Richard Puleston, Bart., Anna Eleanora, Frances and Elizabeth Hawkshaw, daughters of Lieutenant Colonel John Stuart Hawshaw of Divernagh, County Armagh. The monument of the spot, which still exists, reads- “In memory of Edward Parry and his two sons John and Benjamin Parry, who were interred near this spot. Edward Parry, D.D., Pro-Vice-Chancellor of the University of Trinity College, Dublin, was consecrated Bishop of Killaloe, 28th March, 1647, and died of the plague in this city, July 20th, 1650. John Parry, D.D., was promoted to the Deanery of Christ’s Church, Dublin, Apl. 2, 1666; was consecrated Bishop of Ossory Apl. 22, 1672; and departed this life Dec. 21st 1677. Benjamin Parry DD was promoted to the Deanery of St Canices Kilkenny Feb. 19th 1673, to the Deanery of St. Patrick's Dublin Feb. 17th 1674, was consecrated Bishop of Ossory on the death of his brother John Parry and departed this life Oct. 4th 1678. On the repairing of this church AD 1848 by permission of the Rev. James Howie AM prebendary of the same. Dame Emma Elizabeth Puleston of Albrighton Hall, Shrophire relict of Sir Richard Puleston Bart and Anna, Eleanora, Frances, and Elizabeth Hawkshaw, daughters of the late Lieut Colene John Stewart Hawkshaw of Divernagh Co. Armach, caused this new monument to be erected in memory of the above named bishops. The said Sir Richard Puleston and Lieut. Colonel John Steward Hawkshaw having been Lineally descended from the above named Edward Parry. The monument underneath was the one originally erected by the said John Parry to the memory of his Father Edward Parry”
