= Lancelot Bulkeley =

Anglican Archbishop of Dublin (1619-1650)

The Right Reverend Lancelot Bulkeley D.D.
- Archbishop of Dublin; Bishop of Glendalough; Primate of Ireland
- Church: Church of Ireland
- Diocese: Dublin and Glendalough
- Appointed: 30 April 1619
- In office: 1619–1650
- Predecessor: Thomas Jones
- Successor: James Margetson

Orders
- Ordination: 1594 by Hugh Bellot
- Consecration: 3 October 1619 by Christopher Hampton

Personal details
- Born: 1568/9 Beaumaris, Anglesey, Wales
- Died: 8 September 1650 Tallaght, South Dublin, Ireland
- Buried: St Patrick's Cathedral, Dublin
- Denomination: Anglican
- Parents: Richard Bulkeley & Agnes Needham
- Spouse: Alice Bulkeley
- Children: 3

Lancelot (Launcelot) Bulkeley (1568? – 8 September 1650) was a Welsh Archbishop of Dublin and member of the Privy Council of Ireland.

== Life ==
He was the eleventh and youngest son of Sir Richard Bulkeley of Beaumaris and Cheadle, but the eldest by his second wife, Agnes, daughter of Thomas Needham of Stenton. He was thus half-brother of Sir Richard Bulkeley. His parents' marriage was unhappy: his mother was unfaithful to his father, and his father's sudden death led to an accusation by his brother that she had murdered him (she was tried for murder but acquitted). He entered at the beginning of 1587, as a commoner, Brasenose College, Oxford, where he proceeded B.A.; he afterwards moved to St. Edmund Hall, where he took his M.A. degree in 1593. On 13 November of the same year he was ordained deacon by Hugh Bellot, bishop of Bangor.

Some years later he became Archdeacon of Dublin, and he was promoted to its see in 1619. Subsequently, he was named by James I a member of the Privy Council. He revived the controversy regarding the primacy of Ireland, and on the question being submitted to Thomas Wentworth, Lord Deputy of Ireland, the precedency was given to the Archbishop of Armagh. At Christmas 1628 he was involved in an unsuccessful attempt to prohibit the public celebration of the Roman Catholic Mass. When the news reached the city there was a large scale riot, and a mob stoned Bulkeley, who had to seek refuge in a private house; to his outrage, Dublin Corporation refused to take any steps to assist him and refused entry to the town to the troops sent by the Crown to quell the riot.

In 1630 he complained about the activities of Saint Anne's Guild, the leading religious guild in medieval Dublin. Based in St. Audoen's Church, it was still in effect a Roman Catholic body. Bulkeley complained that the guild "hath swallowed upp the Church's means."

Bulkeley was one of the Council who in 1646 issued a proclamation confirming the peace treaty concluded in that month between the Marquis of Ormonde and the Roman Catholics. On 8 March 1649, it was decreed that all honours, castles, etc. belonging to the archbishopric of Dublin should be vested in General Henry Ireton, president of Munster, and Bulkeley was committed to prison for resisting the act passed by the English Parliament in 1647, prohibiting the use of the Book of Common Prayer.

The archbishop died at Tallaght on 8 September 1650, in his eighty-second year, and was buried in St. Patrick's Cathedral, Dublin under the communion table.

He was the author of a pamphlet, Proposals for sending back the Nobility and Gentry of Ireland.

== Marriage & children ==
By his wife Alice, daughter of Roland Bulkeley of Conwy, he had at least seven children:

- William (Archdeacon of Dublin). William was the father of Sir Richard Bulkeley, 1st Baronet.
- Richard,
- Margaret,
- Alice,
- Dorothy,
- Mary,
- Grizel. Grizel married Ambrose Aungier (1596-1654): two of their sons held the title Earl of Longford.

Church of Ireland titles
Preceded by Thomas Jones	Archbishop of Dublin; 1619–1650	Succeeded by vacant, then James Margetson
