= Augustinian Friary of the Most Holy Trinity, Dublin =

Medieval Roman Catholic priory in Dublin, Ireland

Coordinates: 53.3432°N 6.2776°W

Most Holy Trinity, Dublin
- Interactive map of Most Holy Trinity, Dublin

Monastery information
- Order: Order of Saint Augustine
- Established: c. 1259
- Disestablished: 1540
- Dedication: The Most Holy Trinity
- Diocese: Dublin

People
- Founder: The Talbot family

Site
- Location: Temple Bar, Dublin, Ireland
- Visible remains: Underground, one subterranean wall in St. Cecilia Street

The Augustinian Friary of the Most Holy Trinity was an Augustinian Roman Catholic Priory, founded c. 1259, by the family of Talbot on the south bank of the river, near what is now Crow Street, Dublin. At the time the priory was built, it was just outside of the city walls. The Friary most likely followed the design of the parent priory Clare Priory in the town of Clare, Suffolk. The Friary was suppressed in 1540 when it was described as a "church with belfry, a hall and dormitory". The friars continued to operate in secret within the city and there are several mentions of them in the city archives until the late 1700s when they consecrated a new church.

Very little is known of the Augustinian Friary, and the full extent of the friary lands and ancillary buildings have not yet been established, though the area bounded by Temple Lane, Temple Bar, Fownes Street Upper and Cecilia Street, is believed to mark the boundaries of the friary. In 1281 Geoffrey FitzLeones and his wife Joanna made a gift of the rents of their lands to the Friary.

The site is shown on John Speed's Map of Dublin (1610) (number 11), has been partially excavated, and is listed on the National Monuments Service database, Those excavations revealed c. 70 burials of late 12th -14th century (1993), surviving remains of the friary on the east side of Cecilia House (1995 test excavations) and in 1996 excavations exposed a section of wall with a relieving arch and a corner tower.

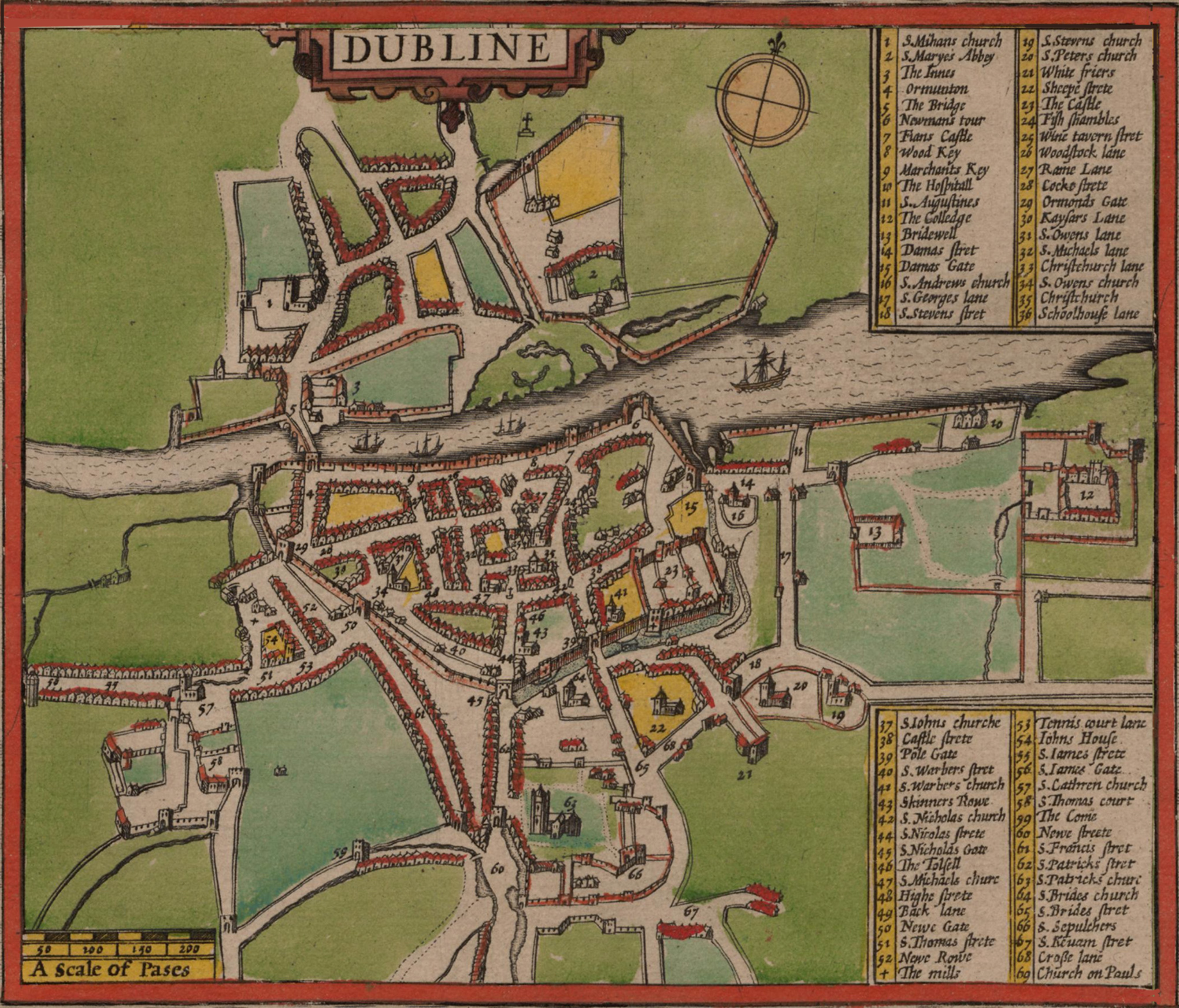
John Speed's Map of Dublin (1610)

== History ==
No description of the original friary exists, however, much detail exists on similar and contemporaneous Augustinian friaries in England. Archdall in his 'Monasticon' states "This monastery was very considerable, erected on the banks of the River Liffey, and was the General College for all the Augustinian Friers in Ireland". The buildings alone covered one and a half acres, and would have followed the pattern of an English Augustinian friary, with a number of individual buildings around a courtyard, including a church, cloisters leading to a dining room, dormitory buildings, a kitchen, the Prior's house, with a building set aside for sick and elderly friars, a bakehouse, guesthouse, a house for students, a novitiate house and a house for lay brothers, a garden and also a farm.

=== The Augustinians Friary of the Most Holy Trinity (1259-1540) ===
Augustinian friars under ‘The Order of St Augustine’ first established in Ireland in the 13th Century, during the medieval period. Dublin at this time, was now an Anglo-Norman walled town but was in origin a Viking settlement. Augustinian ‘Rule’ (way of life) was present in Dublin from at least 1146. Augustinian Canons were present at ‘Christ Church’ (founded in 1162) and the priory at Priory of All Hallows. All Hallows founded in 1166 by Dermot McMorrow became the property of the mayor and corporation in 1538, later becoming the part of site of Trinity College as established in 1592. While the Augustinians date their history to their St Augustine (354-430) a Bishop in Hippo, North Africa, it wasn’t until the early 13th century in Tuscany, Italy that they formally developed.

The story of the Dublin Augustinians is party a storey of the Augustinians in England, because it was from there that they came. The order prospered in England with several Priories (over 20 in all) by the close of the 12th Century. They began to look westward to Ireland with expansion in mind. All they needed were some wealthy benefactors with Land at their disposal and these they found in Norman Families who had settled in Ireland since the previous century. The Normans had sought tutors for their children and chaplains for their manors. The Augustinians at the time numbered several learned friars in their ranks and they would later establish houses at Oxford (1266) and at Cambridge (1289). Patronage came from a wealthy Norman Family in Dublin, the Talbots

The first reference to the Augustinian Friars being in Dublin is in a will for 1282. The exact date of the friars arrivals unclear but suggests the foundation date closer to 1275. The site, donated by the Talbot Family, was located on the banks of the Liffey in open countryside and to the east of the city walls. The Friary itself was dedicated to the Holy Trinity and was described by the 18th century historian Mervyn Archdall as a very considerable foundation.

Archdall in his 'Monasticon' [26] states "This monastery was very considerable, erected on the banks of the River Liffey, and was the general college for all the Augustinian Friars in Ireland". According to the Archaeologists report, the northern boundary of the Friary was formed by the River Liffey. The southern boundary was formed by Dame Street. The early western boundary was possibly Temple Lane South, while the eastern boundary may have been where Fownes Street Upper now is.

The growth in numbers and in houses of Augustinian Friars in the 14th century received a severe setback with the outbreak of the Black Death (Plague) in 1348. The Dublin House had a high reputation for the learning of its members. The Archbishop of Dublin, John Allen noted this when in 1535 he said “the hermit friars of St. Augustines are distinguished in learning and surpass all other mendicants in excellence”.

=== Decline and Dispersal ===
The break (in c.1529) between Henry VIII and Rome over the refusal of Pope Clement VII to grant him a divorce from Catherine his wife, had major repercussions for all religious orders and their properties one both Britain and Ireland. With Henry assuming the role of head of The Church of England, the Augustinian Prior General was effectively prevented from exercising any supervision of the Order where the English province was concerned. The English provincial was forbidden to have any contact with Rome. Monasteries, Abbeys, Convents and Friaries were all closed and the properties confiscated, with their former occupants left to fend for themselves.

There was always the hope among the friars that a change in the monarchy would restore the freedom to practice religion and this freedom appeared intermittently for short periods. Within a couple of years of Stuart King James I), a royal proclamation ordered all priests out of Ireland, with fines for the recalcitrant and rewards for informers.

In 1540 the property of the Dublin priory was handed over to Richard Nagle, its former Prior (and loyal to Henry VIII). The buildings changed ownership a number of times in the ensuing decades and by 1627 the walls of the friary had entirely disappeared. Around 1654, Irish Augustinians exiled on the continent began searching for a place of their own eventually settling in Rome in 1656.

According to Thomas C. Butler in ‘John's Lane:a history of the Augustinian Friars in Dublin 1280 - 1980’ the friary buildings alone covers one and a half acres. The Friary was suppressed in 1540 when it was described as a "church with belfry, a hall and dormitory” - John Brennan (1840).

Part of the Friary complex included a tower later called the 'Crows Nest' from where Crow Street gets its name. The exact location of the Crows Nest remains uncertain but it was most likely located between no 3 and or 4 Cecilia Street. It was later noted in numerous accounts in the 1600s as a prominent meeting place and hosted many illustrious figures of the time including the following:

During 1654 William Petty often using high points in the landscape, completed the office work of his Down Survey "In Dec 1654 William Petty entered into a contract with the then government for the Survey of Ireland. It is noted that the office work for his now lauded Survey was carried out in a large house Known as ‘The Crows Nest’. His survey was completed in thirteen months with the aid of ‘foot soldiers’.

In 1683, The Dublin Philosophical Society (DPS) "By the 14th of April 1684, the meetings were taking place in the house known as Crows Nest, which was off Dame Street, close to the original meeting place in the provost’s lodgings in Trinity College. The rooms were let from the apothecary Robert Witherall, who was to lead the guild of Barber Surgeons in 1693" - Memoir of the Dublin Philosophical Society of 1683.
