= Court of King's Bench (Ireland) =

Former senior court of common law in Ireland

The Court of King's Bench (of Queen's Bench when the sovereign was female, and formerly of Chief Place or Chief Pleas) was one of the senior courts of common law in Ireland. It was a mirror of the Court of King's Bench in England. The King's Bench was one of the "Four Courts" which sat in the building in Dublin which is still known as "The Four Courts", and is still in use.

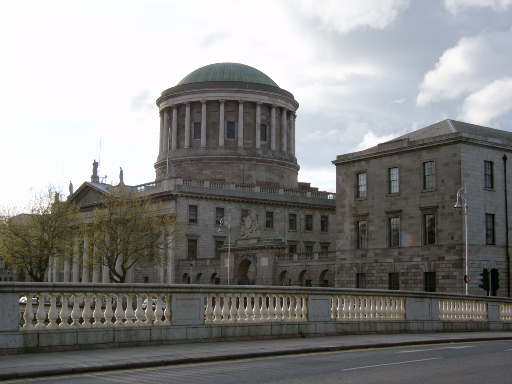
The Four Courts, present day

== Origins ==
According to Elrington Ball, the Court called the King's Bench can be identified as early as 1290. It was fully operational by 1324, headed by the Lord Chief Justice of Ireland, who was assisted by at least one, and usually, two or more associate justices, although for brief periods the Chief Justice was forced to sit alone, due to the lack of a suitably qualified colleague. A statute of 1410 provided that a trial in King's Bench set down for a specific county must proceed there, and must not be moved to another venue without good reason. By 1612 the workload, even with a full bench of four judges, was so heavy and the backlog of cases so large, that Sir William Sparke was appointed an extra justice of the Court (he later became fourth Justice), to avoid the protraction of lawsuits, and to ride the circuits (which many judges were reluctant to do, due to the condition and danger of the roads).

== Role ==
The King's Bench was the principal court of criminal jurisdiction and civil jurisdiction, and its Chief Justice was the most senior judge in Ireland after the Lord Chancellor of Ireland. Its workload was more onerous than that of the Court of Exchequer and the Court of Common Pleas (although the Crown regarded the Exchequer as more important, due to its central role in detecting fraud and collecting revenue). There was a tradition that King's Bench judges must be of a higher professional calibre than those of the other common law courts. In the sixteenth and seventeenth centuries the Crown expressed a strong preference for appointing English-born judges to the King's Bench, and especially to the office of Lord Chief Justice. From the beginning of the eighteenth century however no objection was made to the appointment of Irish-born judges.

== Abolition ==
The Court of Queen's Bench was abolished in 1878 by the Supreme Court of Judicature Act (Ireland) 1877 and its jurisdiction passed to the Queen's Bench Division of a new High Court of Justice in Ireland. The High Court was itself abolished by Section 40 of the Government of Ireland Act 1920. That section created a High Court in Northern Ireland, which still contains a Queen's Bench Division, with similar jurisdiction to its counterpart in England and Wales. In the Republic of Ireland the jurisdiction passed to the new High Court of Ireland.

== See also ==
- Court of King's Bench (England)
