= St. Mary del Dam =

Former parish church in Dublin, Ireland

Coordinates: 53°20′38″N 6°16′2.77″W

St. Mary del Dam is a former parish church in Dublin, Ireland that for many years occupied an important position in the city, and after which Dame Street is named.

The church was located close to the present day location of City Hall, Dublin.

== The church ==
In 1319 the Irish Parliament ordered that the belfry of St. Mary del Dam be repaired.

It was here that the coronation of the boy impostor, Lambert Simnel, took place in 1487. There was a statue of the Blessed Virgin with a crown in the church. From this church, the crown was taken to place on his head, and a great procession started from Dublin Castle, lords and nobles walking to Christ Church Cathedral.

The church came into the possession of Richard Boyle in the 16th century. The Earl of Cork built his house on the site of the church, which gave the name of Cork Hill to the locality.

In the 18th century it was proposed that a chapel for the use of the government should be erected on the site where St. Mary del Dam had stood, but the Dublin merchants, who had an exchange near there, petitioned that an exchange might be erected on this piece of ground, as most convenient for their business. The King agreed to this. The plan of Thomas Cooley was adopted in preference to one by James Gandon, and the foundation stone of the Royal Exchange was laid on 2 August 1769.

== The cemetery ==
The cemetery, which was next to the church, was taken over by the garden of Cork House where Cork Hill. It was named for the Earl of Cork.

== References and sources ==
Notes

Sources

- Peter, A. (1927). Dublin Fragments: Social and Historic. Dublin: Hodges Figgis & Co.
- Gilbert, John (1854). A History of the City of Dublin. Oxford: Oxford University.
- George Newenham Wright (2005). "An Historical Guide to the City of Dublin". Online book. Archived from the original on 31 October 2007.
- Craig, Maurice (1969). Dublin: 1660-1860. Dublin: Allen Figgis.
