= Green Street =

Green Street or similar terms may refer to:

== Streets ==
- Green Street, Cambridge, United Kingdom
- Green Street, Newham, East London
  - Green Street East (ward), Newham, East London
  - Green Street West (ward), Newham, East London
- Green Street, Mayfair, West End of London
- Little Green Street, Kentish Town, North London
- Green Street, New London, Connecticut, USA
- Green Street, Dublin, Ireland

== Buildings and structures ==
- Green Street (MBTA station), Boston, United States
- GreenStreet, a shopping mall and commercial development in Houston, Texas
- Green Street bunker, a fort built by the Australian air force in Queensland in World War II
- Green Street Courthouse, a former courthouse in Dublin, Ireland

== Entertainment ==
- Green Street (film), a 2005 independent drama film about football hooliganism in England
  - Green Street 2: Stand Your Ground, a 2009 crime drama film
  - Green Street 3: Never Back Down, a 2013 action drama film
- Green Street (album), a 1961 jazz album by Grant Green

== Other uses ==
- Greenstreet, a surname (includes a list of people surnamed Greenstreet)
- Greenstreet Software

== See also ==
- Green Dolphin Street (disambiguation)
