= City Marshalsea, Dublin =

Former debtor's prison, Dublin, Ireland

City Marshalsea
- Location: Various
- Status: Defunct
- Security class: Debtors
- Opened: 1704
- Closed: 1842
- Managed by: Dublin Corporation
- Director: Dublin City Marshal (to 1796)

The City Marshalsea was a debtor's prison in Dublin, Ireland. Debtors were imprisoned there by order of the Court of Conscience and Lord Mayor's Court of the county of the city of Dublin. The maximum debt was £10 in the Lord Mayor's Court, and 40s. (£2) in the Court of Conscience.

== Name ==
Other debtor's prisons in Dublin which shared the name were the Four Courts Marshalsea, and the Marshalseas of Saint Sepulchre (abolished 1856) and of Thomas Court and Donore (abolished 1826). The original Marshalsea prison from which these were named was built in Southwark south of the City of London, for prisoners from the Marshalsea Court presided over by the Knight Marshal.

== Conditions ==
After the closure of The Black Dog prison in 1794 the City Marshalsea was considered the worst prison in the city. It was run privately for profit; John Thomas Gilbert wrote that "the passers-by were incessantly assailed by the cries of the inmates soliciting charity for their maintenance, or the discharge of their fees". Families of prisoners could also reside there, to protect them from their creditors. In 1823 the inspectors of prisons report improvement from the previous year. In 1836 the Royal Commission on the Poorer Classes in Ireland said the common hall was "a disgrace to the city".

== History ==
The first City Marshalsea was built in 1704 on Merchants' Quay, between Skipper's Lane and Swan Alley. Until 1796, the Dublin City Marshal was Keeper of the Dublin City Marshalsea. In 1802 a report from the Committee on City Leases stated that the City Marshalsea had become so ruinous and insecure that a new one was absolutely necessary. In 1803 Robert Emmet used it as an arsenal during his abortive rebellion.

In 1805 it was relocated, to a brick building attached to the Sheriffs' Prison in Green Street, beside the sessions house (later Green Street Court House).

== Suppression ==
The Municipal Corporations (Ireland) Act 1840 abolished the power of arrest from the Court of Conscience and Lord Mayor's Court, so that no new prisoners were committed to the City Marshalsea. Remaining prisoners were transferred to the Four Courts Marshalsea.
