= The Marshalsea, Dublin =

The Marshalsea, Dublin may refer to the following defunct prisons in Dublin, Ireland:

- City Marshalsea, Dublin
- Four Courts Marshalsea
- Marshalsea of Manor of St. Sepulchre
- Marshalsea of Liberty of Thomas Court and Donore
