= Court of Conscience =

Court of Conscience may refer to:

- Court of equity, as opposed to court of law
- Court of conscience (debts), borough court chartered for recovery of small debts
- Court of Conscience (theology), concept held that one's conscience would testify for or against one's actions in life after death.
