= Dublin City Marshal =

Local government officer in Ireland

The Dublin City Marshal was an officer of Dublin Corporation in Ireland.

== History ==
External image
- 1874 caricature of John S. Carroll wearing his Marshal's uniform

The origins of the office were analogous to those of the Knight Marshal in relation to the City of London. Until 1786 the Dublin Marshal was Keeper of Dublin City Marshalsea, as the Knight Marshal was for the London Marshalsea. Prior to the Municipal Corporations (Ireland) Act 1840 the Marshal was elected annually by the common council from among the freemen; typically this was a formality with the incumbent returned unopposed. The office was often a sinecure given to a relative of a senior member of the common council. The Marshal in 1838 considered his appointment effective "for life". In 1876 Alexander Martin Sullivan called the Marshal "a perfectly needless office that might well be abolished". In the 1880s the council discussed and printed reports on whether to make the office a full-time position; subsequently vacancies were publicly advertised, with election from among the applicants still done by the councillors. Michael McCarthy said after the 1895 appointment of John Howard Parnell, "The post is a sinecure, and its existence probably indefensible; but certainly no man living in Ireland better deserved it than its present holder."

After the 1920 local elections there was a Sinn Féin majority on the council, which supported the self-proclaimed Irish Republic's independence war against the UK. In 1921, when the town clerk suggested that the office of Swordbearer might be abolished, the Marshal wrote to the clerk defending the existing pawnbroking regulations, and the council agreed not to change them. The 1926 report of the Greater Dublin Commission of Inquiry proposed to remove the ceremonial vestiges of the corporation, including the Marshal. The report was not implemented, and the office of Marshal survived until 1965.

== Functions ==
The Marshal had a ceremonial role, including leading the annual Lord Mayor's parade. In 1867, Michael Angelo Hayes "wore a scarlet tunic richly braided, and a cocked hat, a la Francaise, rode a decent-looking horse, and was admired by the crowd". In April 1900, John Howard Parnell as Marshal held the cushion holding the key of the city presented to Queen Victoria by the Lord Mayor at her ceremonial entry into the city.

The Marshal was an officer of the Lord Mayor and Sheriffs' Court, held at the Tholsel and latterly in Green Street Courthouse; in that role he took charge of the custody and sale of goods under attachment.

=== Register of pawnbrokers ===
Two 1780s statutes sanctioned a previous informal arrangement between Dublin pawnbrokers and the Marshal: the Pawnbrokers Act 1786 made the Marshal registrar of pawnbrokers' licences for the whole of Ireland; by the Pawnbrokers Act 1788, he was one of four people who could auction forfeited pledges. The others were the city Swordbearer and two nominees of the Lord Lieutenant of Ireland. The city wards were divided among the four (coterminous with the four police districts of the Borough Police) with the Marshal and Swordbearer holding the more profitable divisions. The 1838 select committee examining pawnbroking in Ireland said "the manner in which successive Marshals of the City of Dublin have discharged the duties imposed upon them by the Act, will be found by the evidence, and by the [1835] Report of the Commissioners of Municipal Inquiry, to have been exceedingly unsatisfactory". The Marshal had not made a report on registered pawnbrokers since 1787, and the data he supplied to the 1838 committee was patchy.

The pawnbroking divisions had been disregarded for some decades until 1941, when the new marshal lost a lawsuit against a pawnbroker on the basis that he did not have jurisdiction as her premises was in the district of the Swordbearer, an office which had fallen into disuse. The Oireachtas passed an act in 1943 to abolish the divisions and allow the marshal to operate everywhere. The registration of pawnbrokers was passed from the Marshal to the district court from 1 January 1965. The office was then obsolete, although the final incumbent, James Cockburn, was still described as "City Marshal" in Thom's Directory in 1972.

== Remuneration ==
An incoming Marshal had to pay surety (£2000 in 1836). The main expense prior to 1786 was the upkeep of the Marshalsea, though the Corporation sometimes granted sums to the Marshal for repairs. After 1786, the right to the fees collected in his various duties made the office of Marshal profitable; the holder often farmed out the work to subcontractors, allowing him to enjoy a sinecure. In 1833 his net income was £630. Pawnbroking had increased greatly from the 1780s to the 1830s. The reformed corporation elected in 1841 under the 1840 act was "determined ... that no officer should be considered as a sinecure", dismissed the incumbent Marshal, and hired a substitute on a fixed salary. In 1849 Thomas Reynolds received £250 and complained that he had lost money by taking the post. By 1876, the Marshal was paying the fees to the Corporation and receiving a salary of £300 from it. However, the Court of Queen's Bench ruled that the fees as registrar of pawnbrokers were not due to the Corporation, so the Marshal could keep them himself. Alexander Martin Sullivan condemned this. In 1894 the total income was about £1000 and Fenian supporters tried to get Jeremiah O'Donovan Rossa nominated to the position.

== List ==
List of Dublin City Marshals
Dates	Name	Notes
1493–	Robert Rouse	
By 1534	Thomas Whitt	
By 1540–1541 or later	Walter Long	
By 1546–1554 or later	John Wilkin	
1555–	Simon Umfrey	
1559–	John Heyne	
By 1568–1582	Nicholas White	Removed for "severall defectes of abilitie". Subsequent marshals had to pay a stipend to White.
1582–1585	James Connell	Merchant.
1585–1586	Thomas Stephens	Was "Keeper of the Marshalsea" from 1580. In 1585, Connell assigned his interest in the office of marshal to Stephens, who also took over Connell's contract with White. Stephens was dismissed "Upon complaint of divers persons".
1586–	Richard Duff	Took over pro tem. upon Stephens' dismissal.
By 1589–1596 or later	Thomas Verdon	Warned in 1589 that the office would revert to Nicholas White unless Verdon paid White the agreed stipend.
1599–1604	Robert Caddell	Received 53s.4d. arrears in 1609.
1604–1610	George Ussher	Merchant from an old Dublin family; brother and uncle of archbishops Henry and James Ussher respectively. Warned in 1606 about complaints against him.
1610–1618	Richard Proudfoot	Merchant. Was keeper of the Marshalsea from 1606. In 1608 he secured the Reversion of the marshal's office, with Ussher paying him 50s. per year for keeping the Marshalsea. "Surrendered his interest and right" to the Corporation in 1618, but not replaced until 1620.
1620–1621	William Thomas	Merchant.
1621–1637	John Butcher	
1637–1640	Robert Blower	
1640–	John Butcher	
1649–1653 or later	William Barloe	
1654–c.1665	Oliver Walsh	Died in 1665.
1665–1683	Edward Harris	A goldsmith.
By 1686	Robert Dowglass	In March 1688 he paid £100 for the office to Thomas Sheridan, the Chief Secretary for Ireland, through agent Henry Wilson via Henry Echlin; Sheridan was shortly thereafter deposed for corruption.
By 1687–1689 or later	John Bermingham	
1696–1701	George Stevenson	Died in office
1701–1704	Roger Gunne	Imprisoned and suspended in 1704.
1704–1707	Richard Blundevill	Was reimbursed the expense of replacing the Marshalsea in 1705. Discharged for "irregularities and misdemeanours".
1707–1722	George Walton	Resigned
1722–1723	Joseph Bentley	Died in office.
1723–1733	John Forrest	Removed from office for refusing to pay £500 rent arrears for the Marshalsea.
1733–1751	John Cooke	Cooke was required to pay rent to Forrest for the Marshalsea. A council committee in 1740 recommending dismissing him for £520 arrears. He negotiated a repayment schedule and a guarantor. In 1750 he owed £740 and proposed ceding the office of Marshal and its debts to another, but instead paid £400 with the balance written off. He died in office.
1751–1771 or later	William Delamain	From a Huguenot family with a delftware business. In 1760 he was warned about rent arrears and poor performance. In 1765 his debt was forgiven on the grounds that prisoners in the Marshalsea were too poor to pay their fines and that jailers had infringed the Marshal's monopoly on sale of beer to prisoners "whereby the City Marshal is deprived of the greatest benefit that he had". In 1771 he petitioned the Irish House of Commons that "by several Acts of Parliament for the Relief of Insolvent Debtors, the Petitioner has been so far abridged of his regulated and proper Fees, as to render said Employment scarce worth his Attendance. And praying Relief."
1772–1811	William Osbrey	Resigned.
1811–1820	William Ferrall	Upon election, he resigned as common councilman of the guild of sheermen and dyers. Died in office.
1820–1831	John Stanley	Died in office.
1831–1842	John Judkin Butler	Dismissed by the new corporation formed after the 1840 reform act.
1842–1867	Thomas Reynolds	Brother of John Reynolds, lord mayor and MP for the city. Henry O'Neill described him as "a sort of laughing-stalk [sic] to the idle gazers at corporation shows". Died in office.
1867–1873	Michael Angelo Hayes	An artist mentioned in Ulysses His wife's brother Peter Paul McSwiney was Lord Mayor in 1864. Henry O'Neill regretted that Irish art buyers had "so neglected his talent that he finds it necessary to play the Jack pudding before the mob of Dublin". Hayes failed to secure re-election. The Corporation unsuccessfully sued him for the fees he collected as registrar of pawnbrokers.
1873–1891	John S. Carroll	Died in office. Son of Sir William Carroll, Lord Mayor 1868–1869. Michael Angelo Hayes caricatured father and son, John in his Marshal's uniform; they sued unsuccessfully for libel. Died in office.
1891	James J. Henry	Assistant town clerk, appointed pro tem. but quickly resigned. Appears in Ulysses, troubled by corns.
1891	Edmund W. Eyre	Secretary of the council's finances and leases committee; appointed pro tem. until the election of a permanent successor.
1891–1894	Charles Kavanagh	Died in office, whereupon the town clerk was acting Marshal pending the election of a successor. In the Little Review edition of Ulysses, Leopold Bloom, after considering John Howard Parnell's lack of attention to the office of Marshal, remarks "Charley Kavanagh used to come out on his high horse, cocked hat, puffed, powdered and shaved." Later editions change the name to "Charley Boulger".
1894–1898	William E. Clancy	Censured in 1897 for absence and degrading the office after being imprisoned for "a small debt". Resigned in 1898.
1898–1923	John Howard Parnell	Brother of Charles Stewart Parnell, Irish nationalist political leader. His participation in the Corporation's ceremonies marking Victoria's 1900 royal visit were criticised by others in the Irish Parliamentary Party. Died in office. He appears at intervals in Ulysses, set in 1904; according to Leopold Bloom, "They say he never put on the city marshal's uniform since he got the job." Later, Parnell presents Bloom with the freedom of the city in a hallucinatory episode of the "Circe" chapter.
1923–1940	Jack Shaw	Shaw was elected from 13 candidates, with Thomas Devin and Peadar Kearney second and third. He was dismissed in November 1940, contesting this in 1941 in the High Court.
1941–	Patrick Meehan	He resigned from office.
By 1955–1964	James Cockburn	Father of Don Cockburn, Raidió Teilifís Éireann journalist and newsreader.
