= Little Britain Street, Dublin =

Street in Dublin, Ireland

Little Britain Street
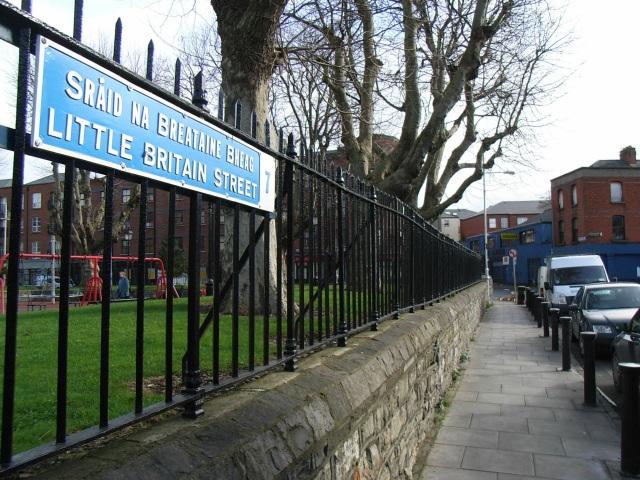
- Little Britain Street sign along St Michan's Park
- Interactive map of Little Britain Street
- Native name: Sráid na Breataine Bheag (Irish)
- Location: Dublin, Ireland
- Postal code: D07
- Coordinates: 53°20′57″N 6°16′11″W
- east end: Capel Street
- Major junctions: Halston Street
- west end: Cuckoo Lane

Little Britain Street (Irish: Sráid na Breataine Bheag) is a street in Dublin which connects Capel Street to the east and Cuckoo Lane to the west.

== History ==
1899 Little Britain Street facing towards Capel Street in 1899

Little Britain Street was named for its proximity and near continuation of the larger Great Britain Street, now Parnell Street. The majority of the street has been redeveloped, but there are some buildings surviving from the early 20th century. Some of the buildings are used for businesses involved in wholesale fruit and vegetables due to the street's proximity to Dublin City Fruit and Vegetable Market.

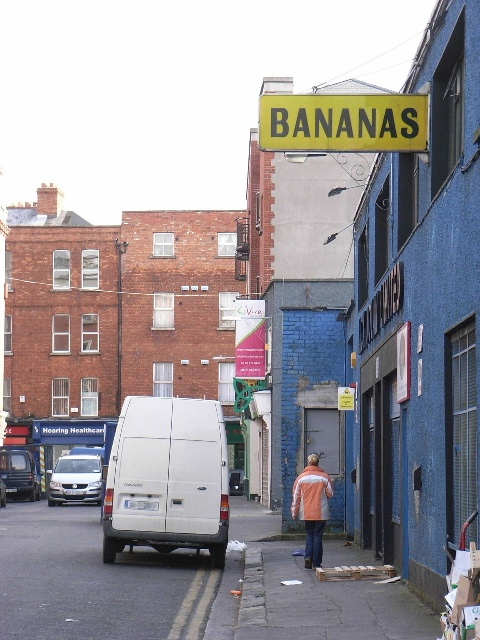
Little Britain Street in 2009

Number 9 was formerly Barney Kiernan's Public House, a pub that was mentioned in the Cyclops episode in James Joyce's Ulysses where Leopold Bloom meets "The Citizen". The pub was colloquially known as "The Court of Appeal" owing to Green Street Courthouse and the Newgate Gaol nearby, and was the setting for Roger McHugh's 1941 play, Trial at Green Street Courthouse.

On 18 January 2024 at 3 pm, a pipe bomb exploded in a hostel on the street run by DePaul Ireland. One man died in the explosion. The explosion resulted in the 70 residents of the hostel being temporarily placed elsewhere. In 2022, a fire broke out in a hostel on the street, with 6 people hospitalised.
