= The Black Dog, Dublin =

Prison in Dublin, Ireland

The Black Dog
- Location in Central Dublin
- Location: Newhall Market (now Cornmarket), Dublin; 53.343685°N 6.276280°W
- Status: defunct
- Capacity: up to about 50
- Population: mainly debtors, with some prostitutes
- Opened: Bef 1677
- Closed: 1794

Notable prisoners
- Rev. Thomas Emlyn (Unitarian, 1705), Father Paul Mac Egan and several other Roman Catholic priests (1708), Surgeon John Audouin (executed 1729), Henry Barry, 4th Baron Barry of Santry (1739)

The Black Dog was a prison in Newhall Market, now Cornmarket, in Dublin, Ireland. Built as a square tower and originally known as Browne's Castle, the site became a tavern and was in use as a prison from at least the 17th century. It was in use up until the late 18th century, when it was replaced by a number of new prisons, including Newgate Prison (built 1783) and a new Sheriff's Prison on Green Street (built 1794).

== History ==
The Black Dog was located in Browne's Castle, which became a tavern from which the prison got its name. From the early 18th century the Black Dog functioned as the main debtors' prison in Dublin. The length of a prisoner's stay was determined largely by the whim of his creditors. It was run privately for profit; beds could be rented from the head warder for one shilling a night. Those who could not afford a bed were consigned to a damp airless dungeon, about 12 feet (3.7 m) square and eight feet (2.4 m) high, which had no light except that which was admitted through a sewer, which ran close by it and rendering the atmosphere almost insupportable.

An early reference for the prison can be found in the burial register for St Audoen's Church of Ireland, Dublin - 'Dec 28 1677 Mr Lawrence Allen prisoner black dog buried'.

One section of the prison was called the "nunnery" because it was used to hold prostitutes who had been captured by the parish watch.

In the 17th century the senior Aldermen of the city and other members of the Dublin Corporation were given power to run the prisons. These functionaries were accustomed to commit the entire management of this department of their offices to clerks, who paid their employers a percentage on all fees received.

In 1729 the gaoler, John Hawkins was tried for mismanagement and corruption. The House of Commons of Ireland decided that "John Hawkins, Keeper of His Majesty's gaol of Newgate, and Sheriff's Marshalsea of the city of Dublin, had been guilty of the most notorious extortion, great corruption, and other high crimes and misdemeanors, in the execution of his said offices; had arbitrarily and unlawfully kept in prison, and loaded with irons, persons not duly committed by any magistrate, till they had complied with the most exorbitant demands; and had put into dungeons and endangered the lives of many prisoners for debt under his care, treating them, and all others in his custody, with the utmost insolence, cruelty, and barbarity, in high violation and contempt of the laws of this kingdom." He was dismissed from his office.

== Site today ==
There are no remains of the Black Dog today. The site is located between Upper Bridge Street and St Augustine Street, north of the Cornmarket.

== Folk tales ==
There is a legend associated with this prison and a mysterious inmate known since as "Dolocher". According to the story, the prisoner, who had been sentenced to death for rape and murder committed suicide. His spirit haunted the jail and caused several gruesome deaths in the vicinity in the guise of a demon or wild beast.

== See also ==
- Debtors' Prison Dublin, erected in 1794
