= Michael Angelo Hayes =

Irish watercolour painter (1820–1877)

Michael Angelo Hayes, RHA (25 July 1820 – 31 December 1877) was an Irish watercolourist who specialised in painting horses and military subjects.

== Life ==
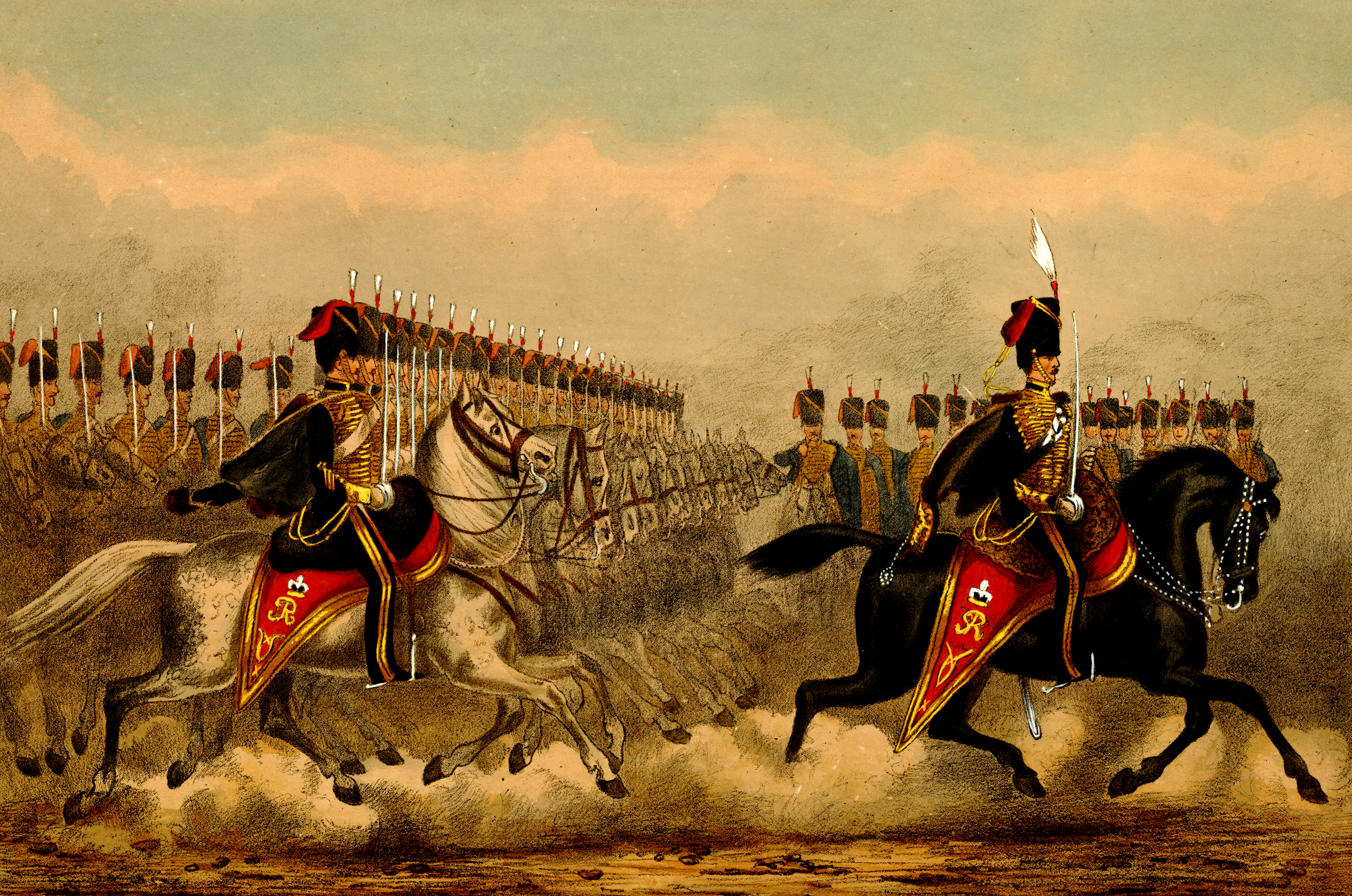
The 10th (The Prince of Wales's Own) Royal Regiment of Hussars (c. 1860)

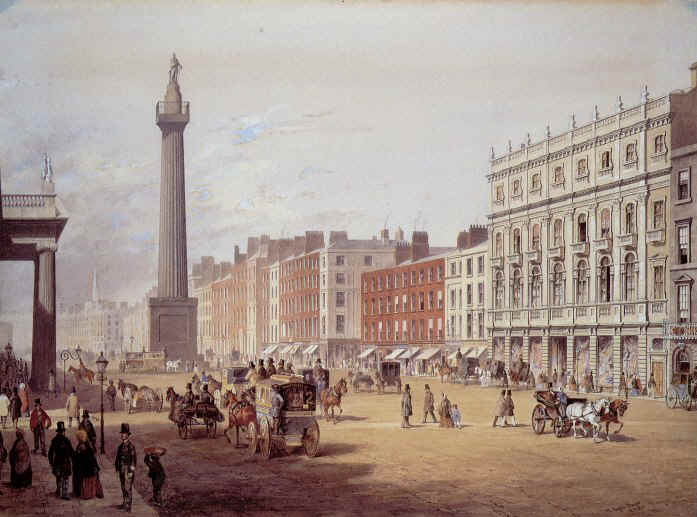
Dublin, Sackville Street 1853

Michael Angelo Hayes was born in Waterford on 25 July 1820, the son of Edward Hayes, a painter of portraits and miniatures who also possessed some skill as a landscape-painter. Trained by his father, Hayes first exhibited at the Royal Hibernian Academy's exhibition in Dublin in 1840, sending The Deserter. He gained a reputation for military subjects and other scenes in which horses took a prominent part, such as The Race for the Corinthian Cup at Punchestown, and Charge of the 3rd Light Dragoons at Moodkee. Large ceremonial subjects, like The Installation of the Prince of Wales as a Knight of St. Patrick in St. Patrick's Cathedral, Dublin, also occupied him.

Michael obtained a prize from the Irish Art Union for a set of drawings illustrating the ballad of Savourneen Deelish. Hayes was in 1854 elected a member of the Royal Hibernian Academy, and in March 1856 was appointed secretary. In spite of an unfortunate schism in the academy, Hayes retained the secretaryship, and published a pamphlet (Dublin, 1857) defending his position.

Hayes was elected an associate member of the New Society of Water-colours in London, and was a regular contributor to their exhibitions. He was much respected in Dublin, and served the office of Dublin City Marshal. On 31 December 1877 he was accidentally drowned by falling into a tank on the top of his house at 4 Salem Place, Dublin. A picture by him of Sackville Street, Dublin, Twenty-five Years Ago was at the Irish Exhibition in London, 1888. Another picture, Wayside Country, was engraved by the National Art Union.
