= Four Courts Marshalsea =

Former prison in Dublin, Ireland

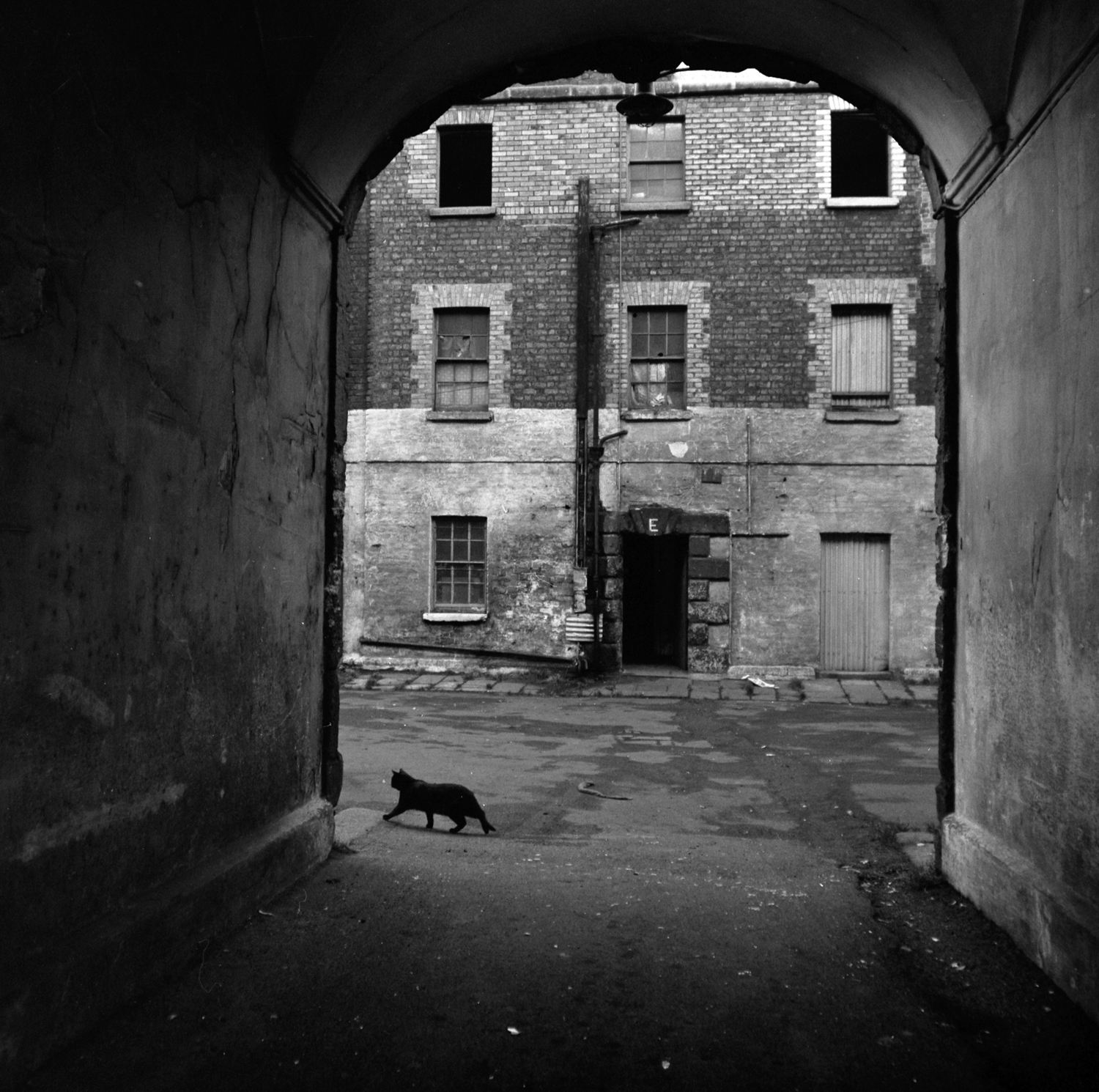
- Former Marshalsea used as tenements in 1969
- Interactive map of Four Courts Marshalsea
- Location: Marshalsea Lane (previously Werburgh Street and Molesworth Court); 53.344923°N 6.282325°W
- Status: defunct
- Security class: remand and debtors
- Closed: 1874
- Managed by: Dublin Castle administration
- Director: Constable of Dublin Castle (from 1546)

Notable prisoners
- Daniel O'Carroll George Francis Train

The Four Courts Marshalsea was a prison in Dublin, Ireland until 1874. The keeper of the prison was the Marshal of the Four Courts, a role filled after 1546 by the Constable of Dublin Castle.

== Name ==
Other debtor's prisons in Dublin which shared the name were the City Marshalsea, and the Marshalseas of Saint Sepulchre (abolished 1856) and of Thomas Court and Donore (abolished 1826).

The original Marshalsea prison from which these were named, was built in Southwark south of the City of London, for prisoners from the Marshalsea Court presided over by the Knight Marshal.

== Buildings ==
In 1580 the Four Courts Marshalsea was built on Werburgh Street.

By 1750 it was in Molesworth Court on the site of the current Dublin Civic offices (between Fishamble Street and Winetavern Street), which was abandoned in 1777 in disrepair. This location was close to the four courts which were at that time located adjacent to Christchurch Cathedral off Skinners Row and St Michael's Hill.

=== 1775 building ===
The final building was in Marshalsea Lane (no longer extant) off Marshal Lane (now Robert Emmet Close), off Bridgefoot Street, off Thomas Street and was likely constructed around 1775. It was described by Samuel Lewis as "a large building ... the prison has two court-yards, two chapels, several common halls and a ball-court."

== Conditions ==
John Dillon said in 1898:

I remember the Marshalsea Prison in Dublin, and in that gaol we had a nice suite of rooms, and we had balls there, and many a pleasant hour I have spent there, in the society of many of the most delightful men in Dublin, who were in the habit of spending some time at that resort. This was 25 years ago, and it was perfectly well recognised then that there was no kind of punishment in the debtors' gaol. They were held there until they made an arrangement with their creditors, but they had everything that their means would allow them to have in prison.

== Prisoners ==
Originally the Four Courts Marshalsea was a remand prison for criminal trials in the Four Courts, and a debtor's prison for cases brought to the Court of King's Bench (one of the Four Courts) from all over Ireland. In 1842, the Four Courts Marshalsea received remaining prisoners from three closing prisons:

- City Marshalsea, prisoners under warrant from the "Court of Conscience and Lord Mayor's Court". The Municipal Corporations (Ireland) Act 1840 had abolished the power of arrest from the Court of Conscience and Lord Mayor's Court, so that no new prisoners were committed to the City Marshalsea.
- Two prisons rendered obsolete by the Debtors (Ireland) Act 1840, which abolished arrest on mesne process in most civil actions:
  - Newgate, prisoners from the city coroner's court;
  - the Sheriff's Prison, prisoners from three of the Four Courts (King's Bench, Common Pleas, and Exchequer) and from the city recorder's court

In 1856, the Four Courts Marshalsea received remaining prisoners from the Marshalsea of the abolished Manor of St. Sepulchre.

== Closure ==
Four Courts Marshalsea Discontinuance Act 1874 (Note: Section 1.)
- Act of Parliament
- Parliament of the United Kingdom
- Long title: An Act for the discontinuance of the Four Courts Marshalsea (Dublin), and the removal of Prisoners therefrom.
- Citation: 37 & 38 Vict. c. 21
- Territorial extent: United Kingdom

Dates
- Royal assent: 30 June 1874
- Commencement: 30 June 1874 (Note: Section 3.)
- Repealed: 22 September 1893

Other legislation
- Amended by: Statute Law Revision Act 1883
- Repealed by: Statute Law Revision (No. 2) Act 1893

Status: Repealed

Text of statute as originally enacted

The Four Courts Marshalsea was abolished by the Four Courts Marshalsea Discontinuance Act 1874 (37 & 38 Vict. c. 21), because of "the very small and diminishing number of persons in that prison, and to the very large prison staff in proportion to the number of prisoners".

The Dublin Militia used it as a barracks in the later 19th century. It was used as a tenement for some years before being fully vacated in 1970 and demolished in 1975.

Some of the calp stone went to repair the City wall at Cook Street.

As of 2023, much of the complex is occupied by Bridgefoot Street Park with some of the remaining prison walls separating the park from nearby housing.

== Bibliography ==
- Gilbert, John Thomas (1854). A history of the city of Dublin. Vol. I. Dublin: James McGlashan.
- Royal Commission on the Poorer Classes in Ireland (1836). "Report on the Gaols of the City of Dublin". Third Report, Appendix (C), Part II. pp. 6b–9b.
