= Green Dolphin Street =

Green Dolphin Street may refer to:

- Green Dolphin Street (novel), a 1944 historical novel by Elizabeth Goudge
- Green Dolphin Street (film), a 1947 MGM film starring Lana Turner, based on the novel
- "On Green Dolphin Street" (song), a 1947 song written for the film
- On Green Dolphin Street (Bill Evans album), 1959
- On Green Dolphin Street (Archie Shepp album), 1977
- On Green Dolphin Street (novel), a 2001 novel by Sebastian Faulks, named for the 1958 Miles Davis rendition of the song
- Green Dolphin Street Prison, a fictional prison in JoJo's Bizarre Adventure: Stone Ocean.

== See also ==
- Green Street (disambiguation)
