= Green Street, Dublin =

Street in Dublin, Ireland

Green Street
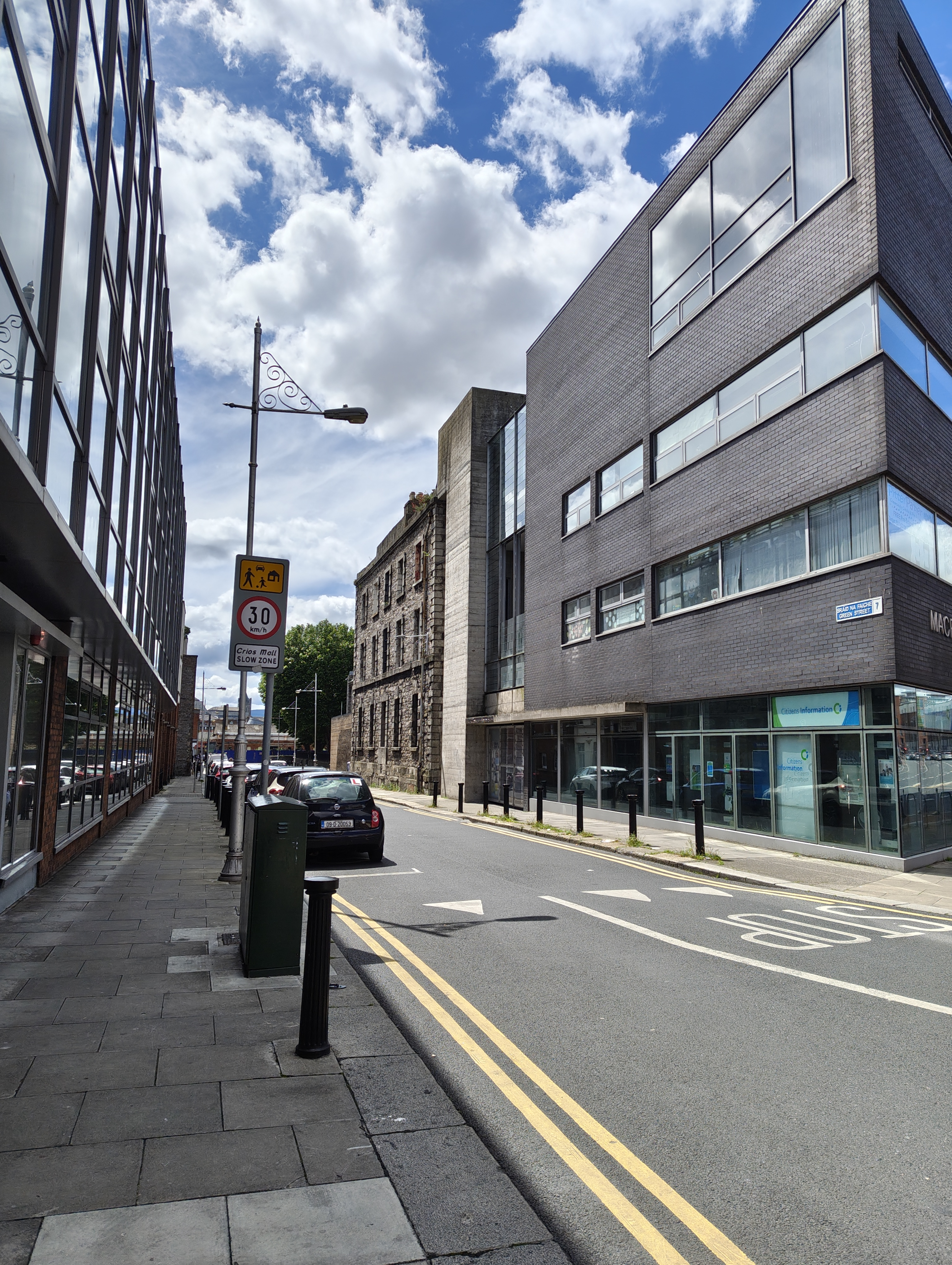
- Looking south down Green Street from North King Street
- Interactive map of Green Street
- Native name: Sráid na Faiche (Irish)
- Location: Dublin, Ireland
- Postal code: D07
- Coordinates: 53°21′03″N 6°16′13″W
- north end: North King Street
- Major junctions: Little Britain Street
- south end: Little Green Street

Green Street (Irish: Sráid na Faiche) is a street in Dublin which connects North King Street to the north and Little Green Street to the south, intersected by Little Britain Street.

== History ==
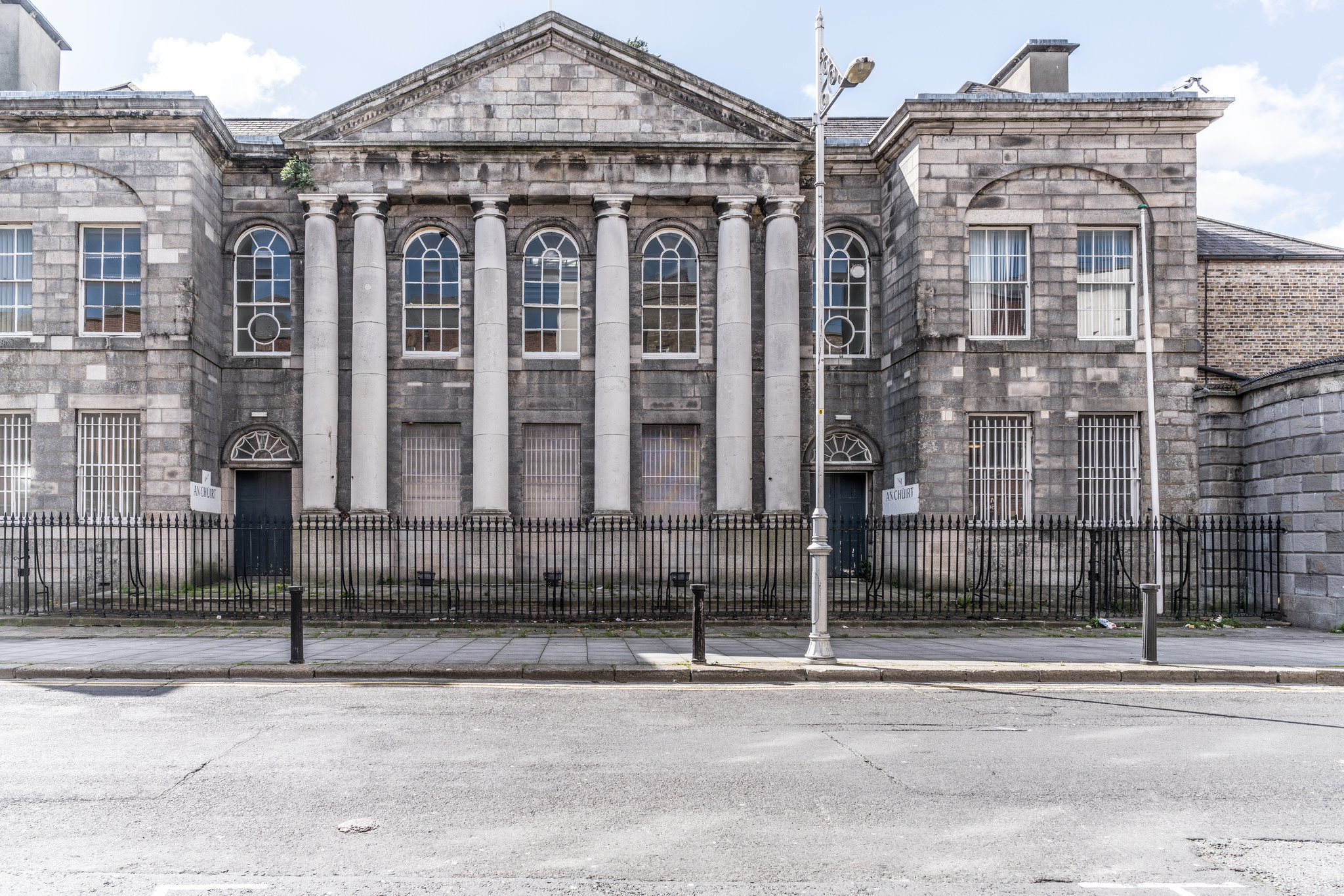
Green Street Courthouse in 2016

In 1558, Green Street was known as Abbey Green if the Green of St Mary's Abbey nearby on Abbey Street. The adjoining street, Little Green Street, was simply Little Green, before the Abbey lands were confiscated by Henry VIII.

The western side of Green Street is dominated by Green Street Courthouse, which was the location of the Special Criminal Court from 1972 until 2009. Many Fenian leaders were tried at the courthouse, such as Wolfe Tone and Robert Emmet. Lord Edward Fitzgerald died there. The former Debtor's Prison to the north of the courthouse is derelict and dates from 1794.

As part of the Smithfield area, Green Street has been largely redeveloped with only a few examples of the older houses on the eastern side of the street dating from the mid-1750s surviving. In the 1860s, many of those houses were listed as tenements.

=== St Michan's Park ===
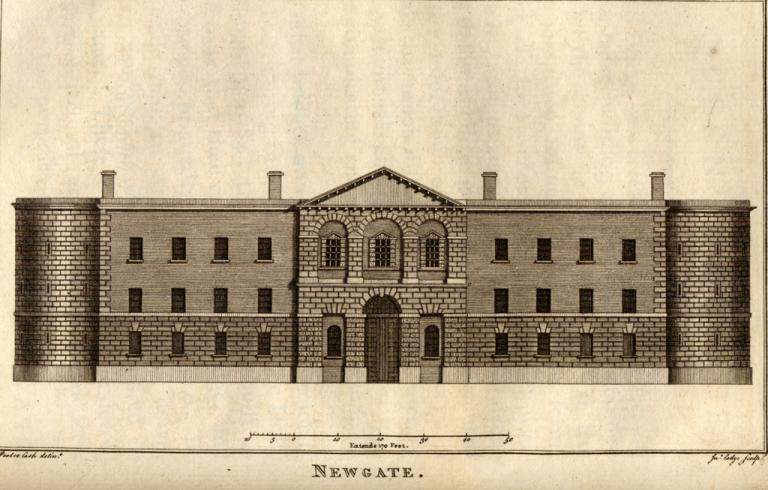
Newgate Prison, the Green Street front

The courthouse was adjoined by Newgate Prison, which is now the site of St Michan's Park. The park was constructed in 1898, and incorporates the foundations of the prison as the park's boundary walls. When built the park had numerous decorative elements and amenities including bandstand, seating, a handball alley and an ornamental drinking fountain. Only the gates, railings, and handball alley are extant. The park also features a Celtic Revival statue of Erin dating from 1903.

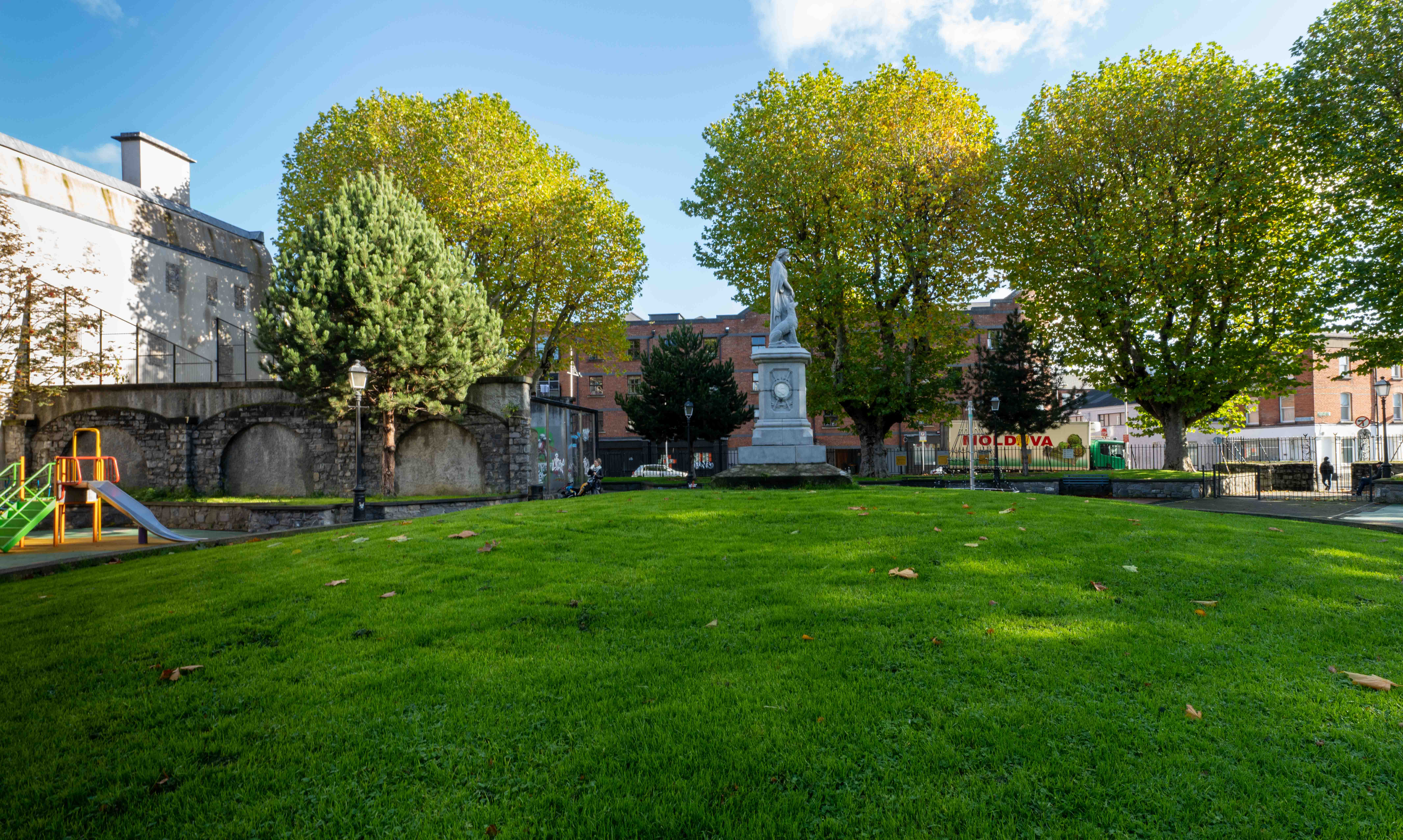
Erin statue in St Michan's Park

While the Green Street Courthouse was in use as the Special Criminal Court, the park was not open to the public. With the closing of the courthouse, the park reopened to the public in 2007 after being redeveloped by Dublin City Council. The redevelopment saw the addition of seating and play equipment. There are London plane trees, black pine, and birch trees within the park.
