= Assizes (Ireland) =

Former court in Ireland

The courts of assizes or assizes were the higher criminal court in Ireland outside Dublin prior to 1924 (and continued in Northern Ireland until 1978). They have now been abolished in both jurisdictions.

== Jurisdiction ==
The assizes had jurisdiction outside Dublin over the most serious criminal offences, such as treason and murder. Persons accused of these crimes would first come before the petty sessions, where a justice of the peace or resident magistrate would decide if there was sufficient evidence to justify a trial. If such evidence existed, the magistrate would issue a bill of indictment and refer the matter to a grand jury, which would decide if the bill was correct and supported by evidence, issuing an indictment.

The assizes themselves consisted of a judge of the Court of King's Bench, or after the Judicature (Ireland) Acts, the High Court of Justice in Ireland, sitting with a petty jury.

== Commissions ==
In Dublin city and county, there were no assizes. Until 1729 serious criminal trials were held at the Court of King's Bench. That year the Dublin Commission Court was established, having the commissions of oyer and terminer and jail delivery which elsewhere were held by the assizes. Technically there were separate city and county commissions; the same judges sat on each, but the Lord Mayor of Dublin formally presided at the city commission's opening. The Commission Court sat six times a year, latterly at Green Street Court House.

The city of Belfast, which became a county borough under the Local Government (Ireland) Act 1898, gained a City Commission on the Dublin model after becoming the capital of Northern Ireland under the Government of Ireland Act 1920. Sir Denis Henry, the first Lord Chief Justice of Northern Ireland, was instrumental in establishing it as part of the Courts of Northern Ireland.

== Abolition ==
=== Republic of Ireland ===
In the Irish Free State the assizes were abolished under the Courts of Justice Act, 1924. However, murder, rape and treason (the latter is now extremely rarely prosecuted) must still be heard by a High Court judge and a jury. When this court sits in Dublin, it is called the Central Criminal Court, when it sits (twice yearly) elsewhere it is the High Court on Circuit. Less serious indictable offences are heard by the Circuit Court.

=== Northern Ireland ===
After the partition of Ireland, the jurisdiction of the High Court of Justice was transferred in Northern Ireland to the High Court of Northern Ireland and judges of that Court now sat at Assizes. The Assizes, and the Belfast City Commission, were abolished under the Judicature (Northern Ireland) Act 1978 and replaced by a single Crown Court in Northern Ireland.
