= Students Against the Destruction of Dublin =

Student organisation

Students Against the Destruction of Dublin (SADD) was a student campaigning group active in Dublin, Ireland, between 1987 and 1991.

It lobbied for the sensitive restoration and re-use of old buildings instead of demolition. It also proposed a modern tram system in Dublin instead of destructive road-widening and ring road proposals. It was known for using large campaigning banners draped on historic structures. The first meetings of the group were held in the School of Architecture in the Dublin Institute of Technology, Bolton Street, Dublin 1. The group was initially set up by four students of architecture: Orla Kelly, Eunan McLaughlin, Roísín Murphy, and Brian O'Brien. They were soon joined by other students from the Dublin Institute of Technology, University College Dublin, Trinity College Dublin and the National College of Art and Design.

The Irish Times stated that SADD "...took the discussion out of drawing rooms and relatively polite meetings into the streets – occupying threatened buildings, staging well-flagged protests and acting as shock troops against road-widening schemes that had done so much damage to the inner city's fabric". Many of the key figures in SADD went on to work in architecture, planning, design and environmental management and continued to contribute to improving urban life in Dublin and further afield.

== Chronology ==
=== 1987 ===
In June 1987, the group campaigned to protect buildings on Clare Street in Dublin 2 that were threatened with demolition and replacement with a new entrance for the National Gallery of Ireland. Later in November 1987, it organised a symposium on Dublin's future in the Dublin Institute of Technology, Bolton Street while in December 1987, it helped organise a large protest march to Dublin's City Hall on Cork Hill to campaign against the City Council's proposals for an 'Inner tangent' road proposed to run through Clanbrassil Street, Dublin.

=== 1988 ===
In January 1988, it continued to campaign against road proposals. It was successful in seeking changes that reduced the eventual width of the redesigned street. In the same month it also campaigned unsuccessfully to save an historic Quaker meeting House in Gray Square in Dublin's Liberties from demolition. The following month members of the group addressed a meeting of the City Council and urged it to abandon its controversial road plans. In February 1988 members of the group occupied buildings on Eccles Street that were in the course of being demolished by the Mater Hospital and halted their demolition. In March 1988 it held an exhibition in the Atrium in Trinity College Dublin entitled 'Tempest, a storm in the mildness of the Millenium Year'. The group made submissions to Dublin City's draft City Development Plan in June 1988. In August the organisation spoke at a Bord Pleanála hearing and argued for the retention of buildings on Dublin's Harcourt Terrace. Later that year it campaigned against the comprehensive redevelopment of Dublin's Bachelor's Walk and produced a postcard entitled 'Don't destroy the central river bank of Ireland' featuring a facsimile of a ten-pound note.

=== 1989 ===
In January 1989, members of the group occupied buildings on Dublin's Arran Quay to try to halt their demolition. Several members of the group became members of the Green Street Trust that was set up in that year to undertake urban renewal projects including the refurbishment of the Debtors' Prison Dublin.

=== 1990 ===
In 1990, the organisation made a submission to Phase One of the 'Dublin Transportation Study 1990' seeking the re-establishment of the Dublin Transportation Authority. As a result, SADD was asked to become a member of the Consultative Committee of the Dublin Transport Initiative (DTI), which operated from 1991 to 1995. The DTI recommended construction of a three-line light rail system which, in a slightly truncated form, became the Luas system which opened in 2004.

=== 1991 ===
In January 1991, it held an exhibition entitled 'Cartoonatics' in the City Arts Centre in Dublin's Moss Street. In March 1991 it argued for a 'dedicated truckway' to remove heavy traffic from Dublin's city centre, instead of an 'Eastern Bypass' road. In September of that year the organisation addressed a meeting of the General Purposes Committee of Dublin Corporation suggesting that the Corporation seek European funding for public-transport and traffic-management projects.
