= Green Street Trust =

The Green Street Trust was an Irish company incorporated in 1990 with charitable status. Its aim was to promote urban renewal in disadvantaged inner city areas through the rehabilitation of historic buildings for contemporary use and where possible to secure multiple uses within individual buildings.

== Conservation Activity ==
The Trust obtained a 99-year lease from the Office of Public Works (OPW) of the former Debtors’ Prison situated on Halston Street and Green Street in Dublin's north inner city and undertook restoration works to the building to plans prepared by McCullough Mulvin Architects. In August 1992 a group of volunteers from Voluntary Service International carried out restoration works to the building.

In 1994 the Trust ran a carpentry and joinery course as a Fás Community Youth Training Project to replace the timber sash windows in the building that were in poor condition. The Trust carried out substantial works to refurbish the Debtors’ Prison in the 1990s but due to escalating building costs and a lack of funding construction work ceased and the Trust handed back the lease to the Office of Public Works.

== Directors and Patrons ==
Most of the directors of the company had been members of Students Against the Destruction of Dublin. The directors included Tony Connelly, Frank Cooney, Ciarán Cuffe, Deryck Fay (Company Secretary), Emma Kelly, Garret Kelly, Ger Lambert, Richard Lyons, Eunan McLaughlin, Rachel McRory (chair), Colm Murray, Jerome Ó Drisceoil, Colmán Ó Siochrú, and Blaise Smith.

Its patrons were Dermot Egan, The Knight of Glin, Justice Niall McCarthy, Dr. Edward McParland, John O’Connor, Breege O’Donaghue, Ruairí Quinn TD, Nicholas Robinson, Gerry Walker and Dr. Pat Wallace.
