= Greenstreet =

Greenstreet is a surname which may refer to:

- Anne Louise Ashley-Greenstreet (born 1835), English hymn writer
- Ivor Greenstreet (born 1966), Ghanaian lawyer and politician
- Lionel Greenstreet (1889–1979), British sailor and trans-Antarctic explorer
- Mark Greenstreet (born 1960), English actor
- Steven Greenstreet (born 1979), American documentary filmmaker
- Sydney Greenstreet (1879–1954), English character actor (known for performances in The Maltese Falcon and Casablanca)
