= Little Green Street =

Street in Kentish Town, London

Coordinates: 51°33′21″N 0°08′43″W

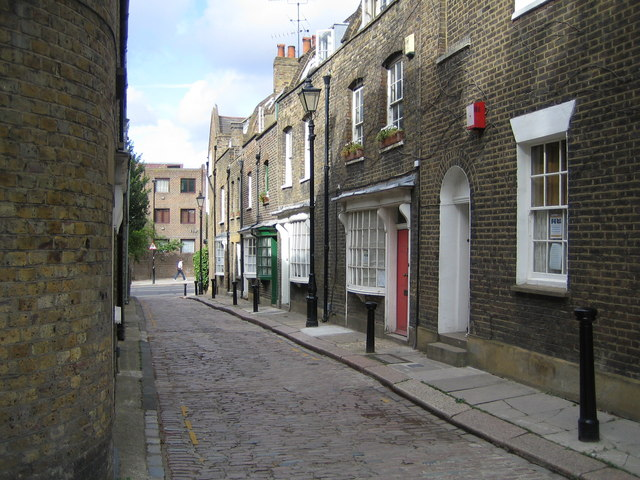
Looking towards Highgate Road

Little Green Street is an 18th-century street in London, located off Highgate Road in Kentish Town.

== Location ==
The street is located in Kentish Town, part of the London Borough of Camden, and is next to the B518 and the Gospel Oak to Barking train line. It is also on Bus route 88 and route 214, being a short distance from stops on both routes.

== History ==
The street is diminutive, with only eight houses on one side and two on the other. The houses were built in the 1780s, are Grade II listed, and remain one of the few intact Georgian streets in London. There are records of the small, bow-fronted shops selling ribbons and mousetraps, and previous inhabitants include manual workers such as carpenters.

One of the first official mentions of Little Green Street is in the court records of the Old Bailey for 10 July 1805, where Mary Lee, a female servant was fined and sent to the Clerkenwell House of Correction for "simple grand larceny" (theft under 40s).

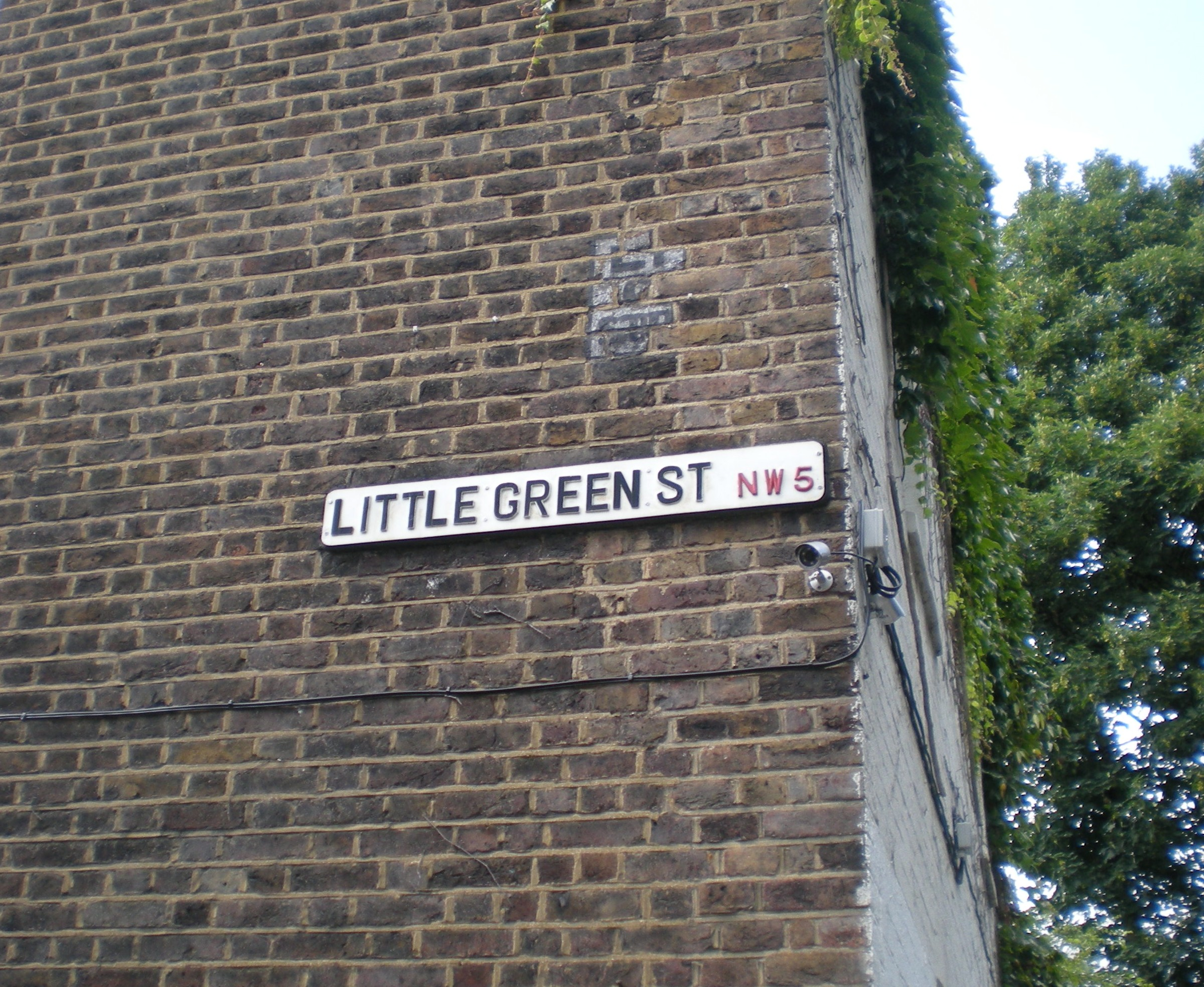
Street sign

Almost a century later, in 1898 or 1899, Charles Booth, in his survey Life and Labour of the People in London, gave the following description of Little Green Street:

"Little Green St. (E. side of H. Road) with 8 old-fashioned cottages; 2 st. and 2 plus attics; round projecting windows; small panes of glass; quaint; been done up; decent. Pink. These on N. side. On the S. are 2 or 3 more modern but much worse houses; 2 and 3 st. light blue."

(The colours in this description refer to Booth's poverty classifications. Light blue was: "Poor. 18s. to 21s. a week for a moderate family". Pink was "Fairly comfortable. Good ordinary earnings.")

== "Dead End Street" by The Kinks ==
Little Green Street was the inspiration for the 1966 song "Dead End Street" by The Kinks and was used as the backdrop to their video for that song.

The video was filmed in black and white and featured each member of the band dressed as undertakers, as well as playing various other characters throughout. With a length of roughly 3:15 in total, it represents one of the first true music videos. Dave Davies says that the BBC disliked the film, claiming it was in bad taste.
