= Green Street, New London =

Street in New London, Connecticut, USA

Green Street is a street in New London, Connecticut. It was laid out in 1787 principally through the land of Timothy Green in Downtown New London and is located off State Street. It retains its original length and width with a number of buildings within arm's reach of each other. Green Street is intersected by Golden Street (laid out in 1782) and Green's Alley (laid out 1786) as Cross Street.

Many of the structures in this area are listed as part of the Downtown New London Historic District, including the Richard Douglass House at 102 Golden Street, the 1801 Richard Douglass House on Green Street, the 1740s "Mistress House" next to the Richard Douglass House, and the 1789 Reverend West House.

Benedict Arnold led British and Tory forces in burning New London in 1781, also attacking across the Thames River in the Battle of Groton Heights. Green Street was laid out soon after, containing many houses and small businesses, including a bakery and a cooperage. Several churches also surrounded the neighborhood.

The New London Methodist Church was organized at the home of Richard Douglass on Green Street in 1793.
