= Anne Louise Ashley-Greenstreet =

English hymn writer

- Born: February 17, 1835; Sheffield, England
- Died: Unknown
- Occupation: hymn writer

Anne Louise Ashley-Greenstreet (17 February 1835 – unknown) was an English hymn writer.

== Biography ==
Not much is known about Ashley-Greenstreet's early life but she was born in Sheffield and her father was a schoolmaster. She married at the age of 41.

One hymn written by her survives, "A Little Talk with Jesus", published in 1871. This information is preserved in John Julian's 1907 Dictionary of Hymnology, which states that Ashley-Greenstreet's popular hymn "A little talk with Jesus" had appeared under the title "In affliction" in his collection of poems Heart Yearnings after Home in 1871. In the 1880 edition, the poem was titled "Communion".

The song was published in Swedish in 1880, translated by Lina Sandell, in the Korsblomman calendar, where the song was noted as having been written by Sandell in 1879. The song was numbered hymn 207 “En liten stund med Jesus” in the ecumenical section of the 1986 Church of Sweden hymnal. The song was published in Finnish in the Church of Sweden hymnal in Finnish, published in 1924, under number 248 “Jeesusen kanssa hetki, Se kaiken tasoitaa”, and the author of the song is noted as Lina Sandell-Berg. In the 2002 Church of Sweden hymnal, its translation “Vain hetki Herran kanssa se mielen tyynnyttää” is a new Finnish translation by Anna-Maija Raittila from 1999.

The song is also in Finnish in the Spiritual Songbook (Finnish: Hengellinen laulukirja), song 473, “A moment with Jesus refreshes the mind,” and in the Siionin kannel, song 126, “A moment with the Lord soothes the mind” (translation by Johanna Ailio).
