= Court of Conscience (theology) =

In 17th-century European theology, the Court of Conscience described the theory that, after death, one's conscience would testify for or against one's actions.

During life, the faculty of conscience was believed to be like, but not the same as, the voice of God. It was thought to draw on divine knowledge and precepts, and apply these laws in order to direct the individual toward right action and warn against wrong action.

Theologians speculated that, after death, the conscience functioned as a record, speaking to a divine tribunal which sat in judgement over each individual. Even a conscience which seemed inactive in life was supposed to awaken and provide a perfect account to the tribunal.

The court of conscience was believed to be governed by natural and divine law.
