= Debtors' Prison Dublin =

Debtor's Prison, Dublin

Debtors' Prison, Dublin
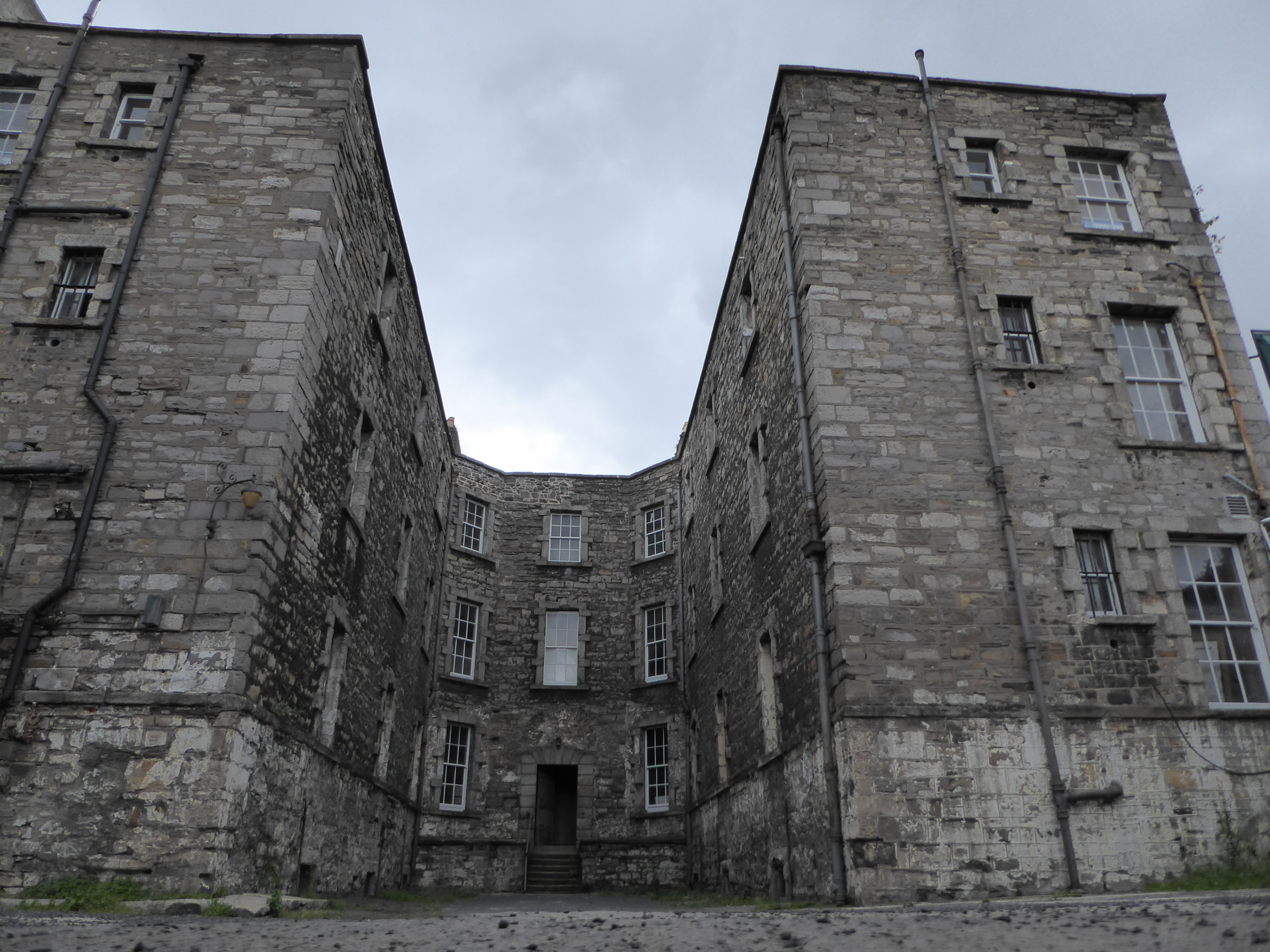
- Dublin Debtors' Prison in 2017

- Location within Central Dublin
- Alternative names: Green Street Prison

General information
- Architectural style: Georgian
- Location: 2 Green Street, Dublin, Ireland
- Coordinates: 53.35026°N 6.270872°W
- Current tenants: vacant
- Groundbreaking: unknown
- Completed: 1794; 232 years ago
- Owner: Office of Public Works

Technical details
- Floor count: three-storey over half-basement

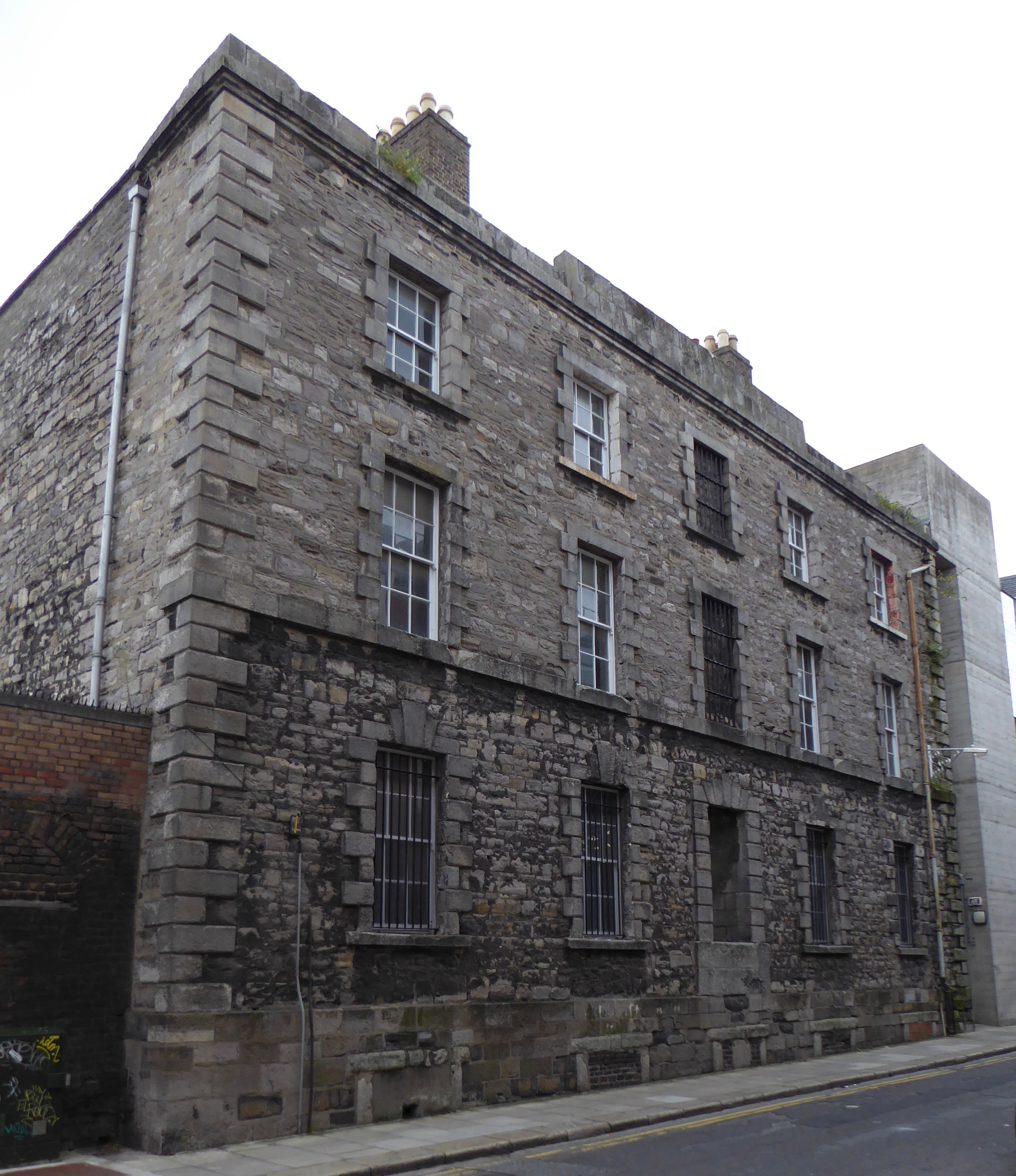
Back of building on Green Street

The Debtors' Prison Dublin is a historic debtors' prison in Dublin’s north inner city, between Halston Street and Green Street. While it is listed on Dublin City Council's Record of Protected Structures, it was also included on the list of 'Top 10 Most-at-Risk' buildings, published by An Taisce in 2021. It is adjacent to Green Street Courthouse.

== History ==
The Debtors' Prison Dublin was erected in 1794. It is situated between Halston Street and Green Street in Dublin 1. It is a U-shaped building built of granite and limestone, rising to three storeys over a vaulted basement. It contains thirty-three cells that were used for individuals who had run up debts, often through gambling. Rooms were rented either furnished or unfurnished, and less fortunate debtors were held in the basement cells. Prisoners were held until their debts were paid. The building was more recently used as a Garda barracks, and as accommodation for Garda widows. In the 1960s it was used as local authority housing by Dublin Corporation.

In the late twentieth century it was threatened with demolition as it lay on the path of Dublin Corporation’s road-widening plans for the Inner Tangent Road. In the 1990s the Green Street Trust, a charitable body composed mainly of members of the Students Against the Destruction of Dublin acquired a lease of the building from the Office of Public Works. It initiated refurbishment works on the building with a view to providing social housing. The Trust ran low on funds and returned the lease to Office of Public Works who now control the building which is currently unused. The building has been used as a location for several films including 'The Tale of Sweeney Todd' and 'David Copperfield'.

=== Squatting at the prison ===
In August 2016, a group of squatters who had been recently evicted from a nearby Grangegorman squat complex began occupying the prison with the stated aim of converting the building into a community art space. Having occupied the building, the State announced that the squatters had to vacate, citing health and safety concerns. The occupants sought support and cooperation from the Office of Public Works, as well as the local community with their stated intention being to restore the building and open the ground floor "for exhibitions and walking tours which would highlight social injustices from the past until today".

In mid-August 2016, an injunction was granted against the squatters, with an order for them to vacate the building by midnight on Sun 21 August 2016. The squatters were threatened with jail time if they did not leave the premises.

== See also ==
- Green Street Courthouse
- Newgate Prison, Dublin
- Squatting in Ireland
