= Newgate Prison, Dublin =

Former prison in Dublin, Ireland

Newgate Prison
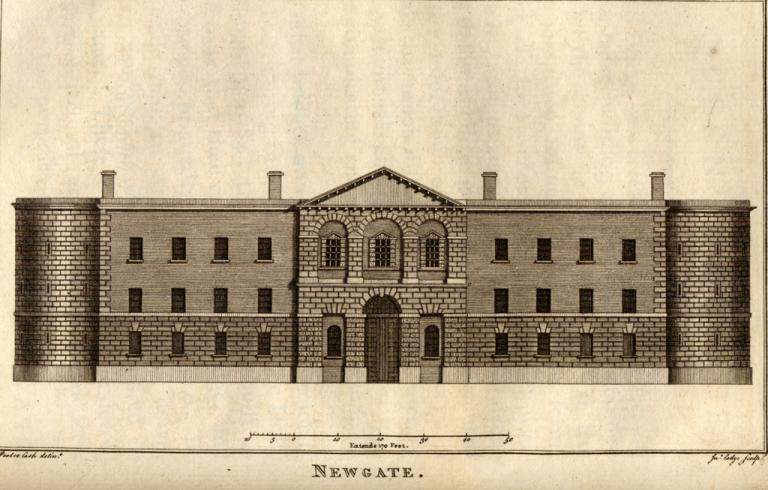
- Front elevation of Green Street building by Robert Pool

- Location within Central Dublin

General information
- Type: Prison
- Location: 'Little Green' (St. Michan's Park), Dublin. Formerly located at Cornmarket, Dublin 8
- Coordinates: 53.3494°N 6.2709°W
- Construction started: 1773
- Completed: 1783
- Demolished: 1893
- Cost: £16,000

Technical details
- Floor count: 3

Design and construction
- Architect: Thomas Cooley

Newgate Prison (Irish: Príosún an Gheata Nua) was a place of detention in Dublin, Ireland. It was initially located at Cornmarket, near Christ Church Cathedral, on the south side of the Liffey and was originally one of the city gates before being moved to a new purpose built prison on Green Street on the north side of the city in 1781. The prison finally closed in 1863 while the building was demolished in 1893. The site today contains Saint Michan's Park while the remains of the prison's boundary walls still form part of the boundary of the park.

== History ==
=== From city gate to prison ===
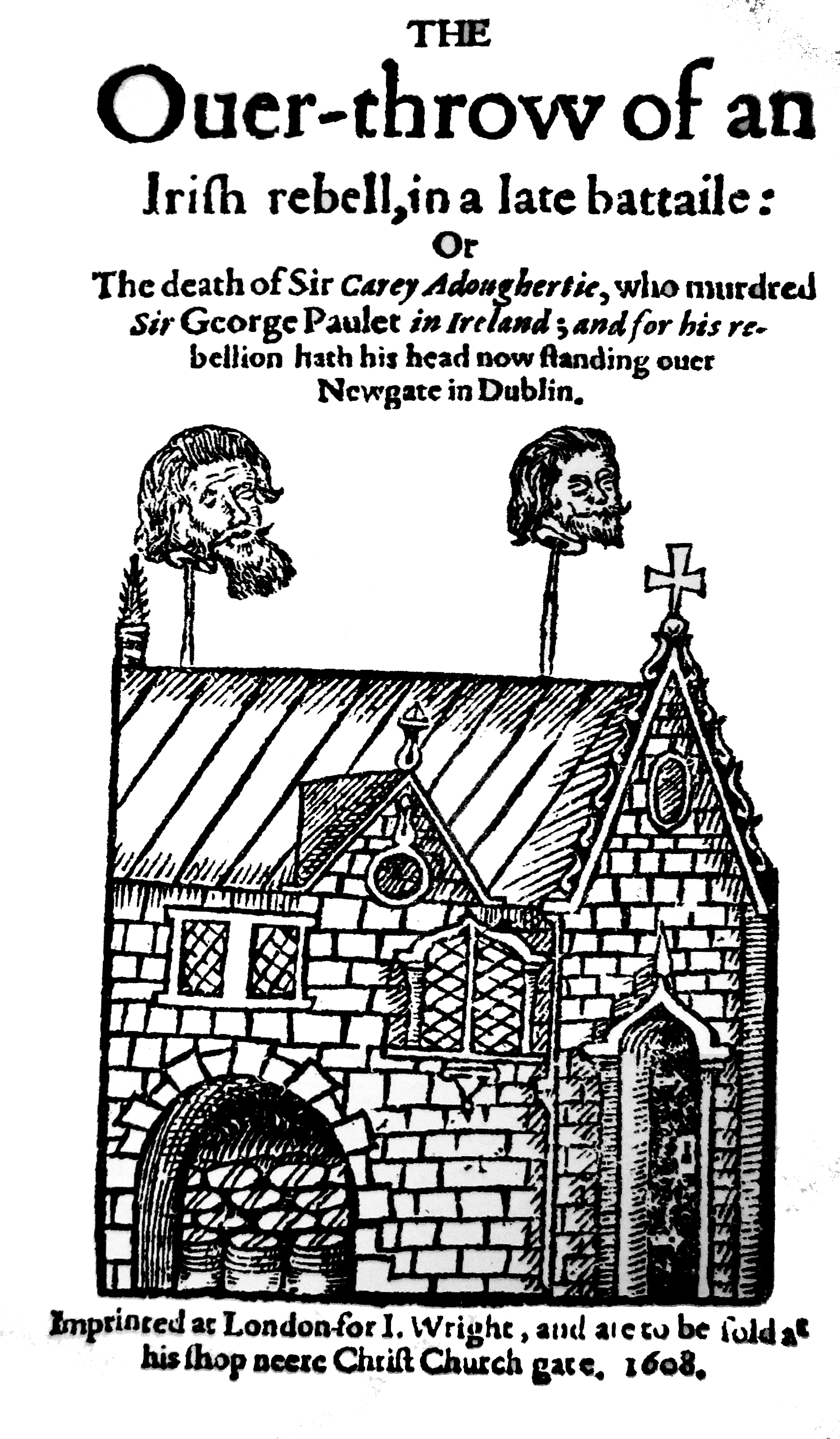
Dublin Gate 1608 displaying the heads of Irish rebels Cahir O'Doherty and Felim Riabhach McDavitt

The exact date of construction of the New Gate is uncertain but it is recorded in 1188. From 1485 this city gate, which marked the western boundary, was used as Dublin's main prison. It was 180 feet (55 m) south of another gate, Brown's Castle, which would also become a place of detention known as the Black Dog while the nearby Tholsel was also used as a jail and debtors prison at various times.

=== 18th century relocation ===
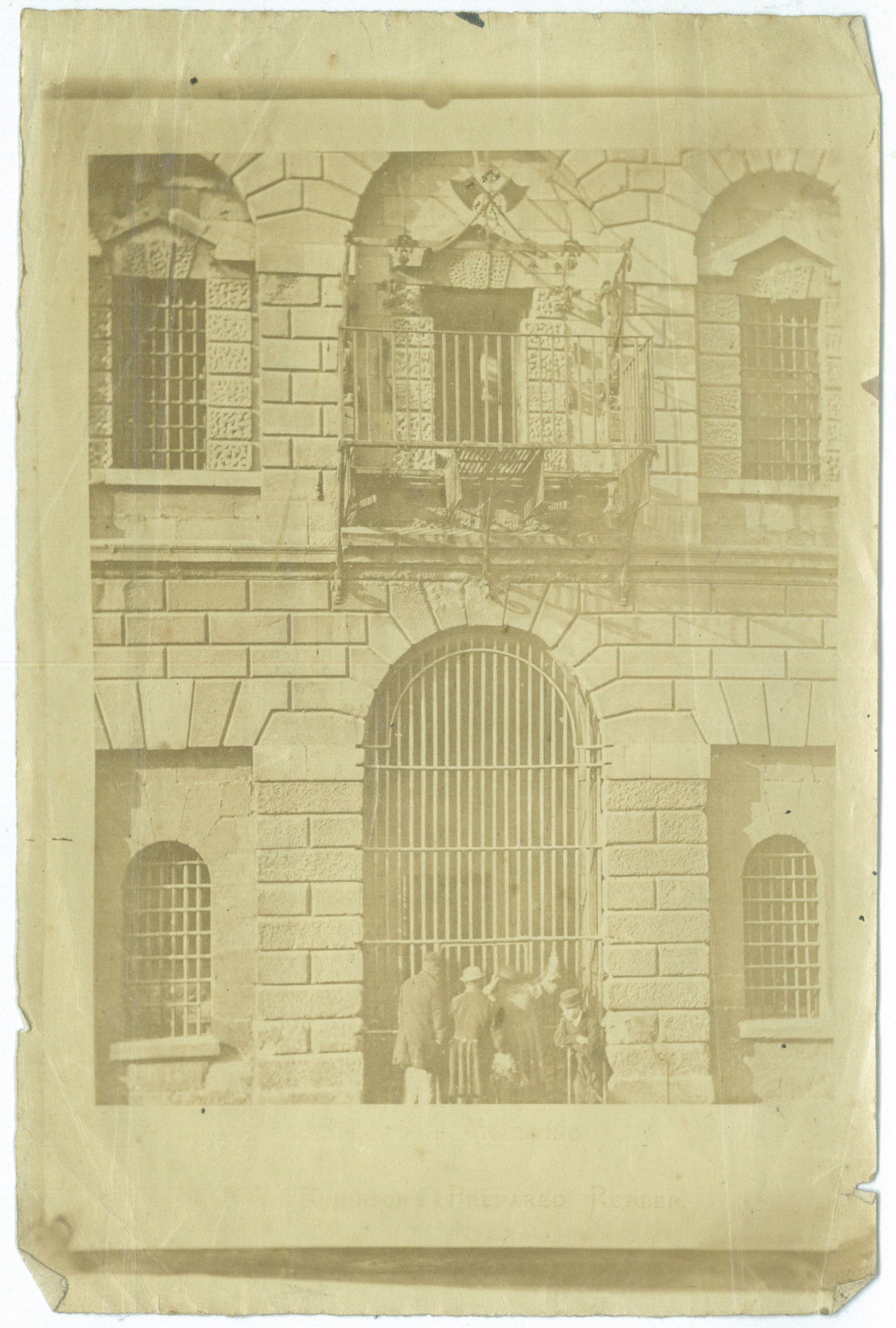
Newgate Prison front and gallows

Between 1773 and 1781, a new prison designed by Thomas Cooley was built to replace the earlier ruined prison. It was relocated to 'Little Green', present-day St. Michan's Park near Smithfield, and officially retained the old name. The new building was badly located and adequate sewerage could not be installed. There were also security concerns as the rear wall of the cells was also the site boundary wall. While there are no reports of successful escapes via this route, it was raised by Inspectors as an obvious design deficiency. All classes of prisoners were mingled together, up to 14 in a single cell. After inspections in the early 19th century some improvements were provided.

=== 19th century ===
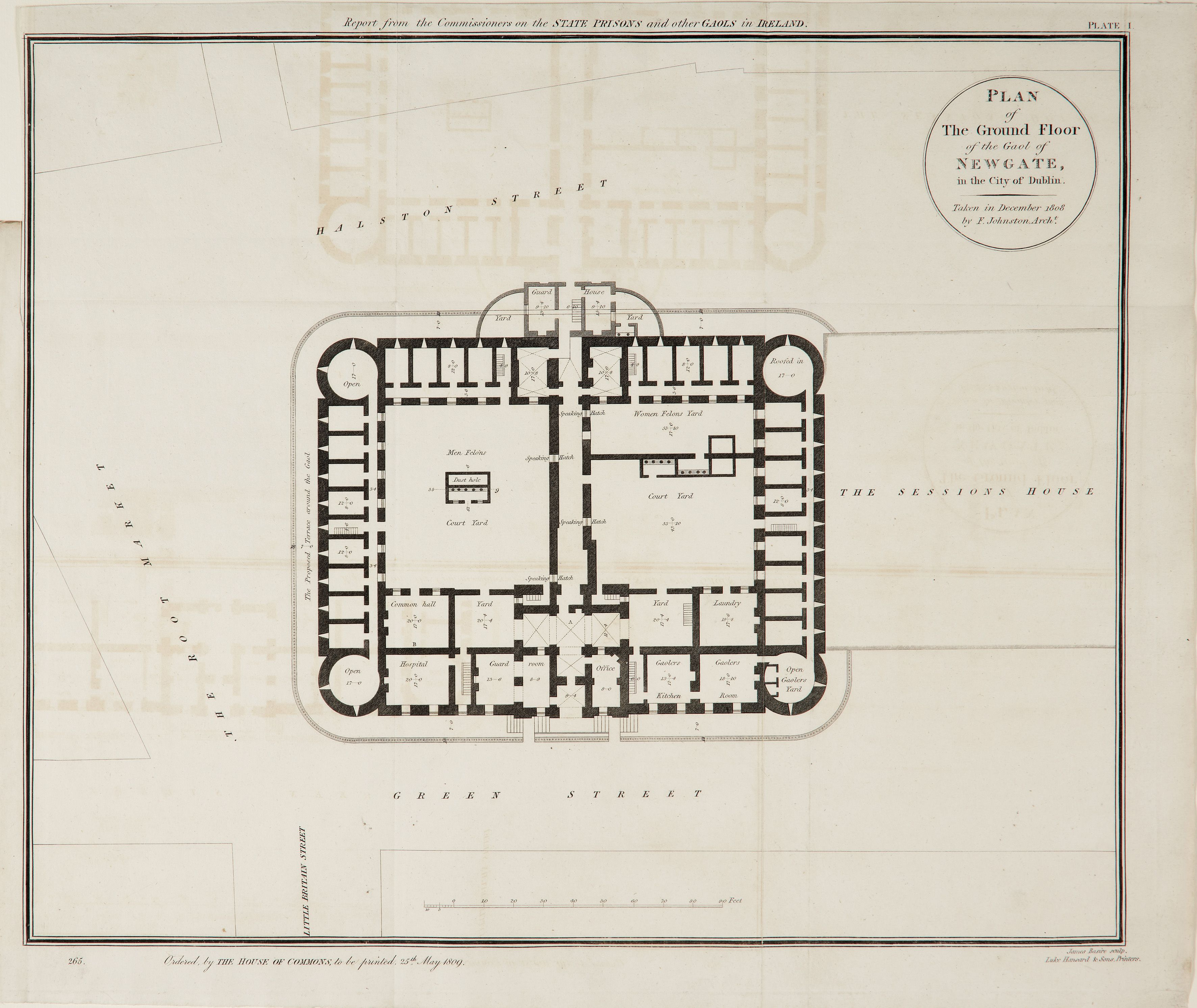
Plan of the prison in 1808 drawn by Francis Johnston.

By the 1840s it was used solely for the holding of remand prisoners, both male and female, usually for a period between a few days and three weeks. On conviction and before sentencing the men were transferred to Richmond Bridewell and the women to Grangegorman-lane Prison. When visited by one of the Prison Inspectors in 1843 there were "30 Males, 9 Females and 11 Lunatics" confined there, but this was considerably less than the average of 100 usually kept there. They were accommodated in 62 cells, 4 dark 'solitary cells', 9 day-rooms, a chapel, 4 small rooms used as a hospital and a number of rooms previously used to hold debtors. There was no laundry or kitchen, the food consisting of bread and milk only. It was staffed by a governor, deputy governor, clerk, schoolmaster and ten 'turnkeys'. The prison finally closed in 1863, from which time until its demolition in 1893 it was used as a fruit and vegetable market. The outline of some of the Newgate Prison foundations are still visible at St. Michan's Park.

== Notable prisoners ==
- Sheares brothers

== See also ==
- Green Street Courthouse
- Debtors' Prison Dublin
