= Green Street Courthouse =

Courthouse in Dublin, Ireland

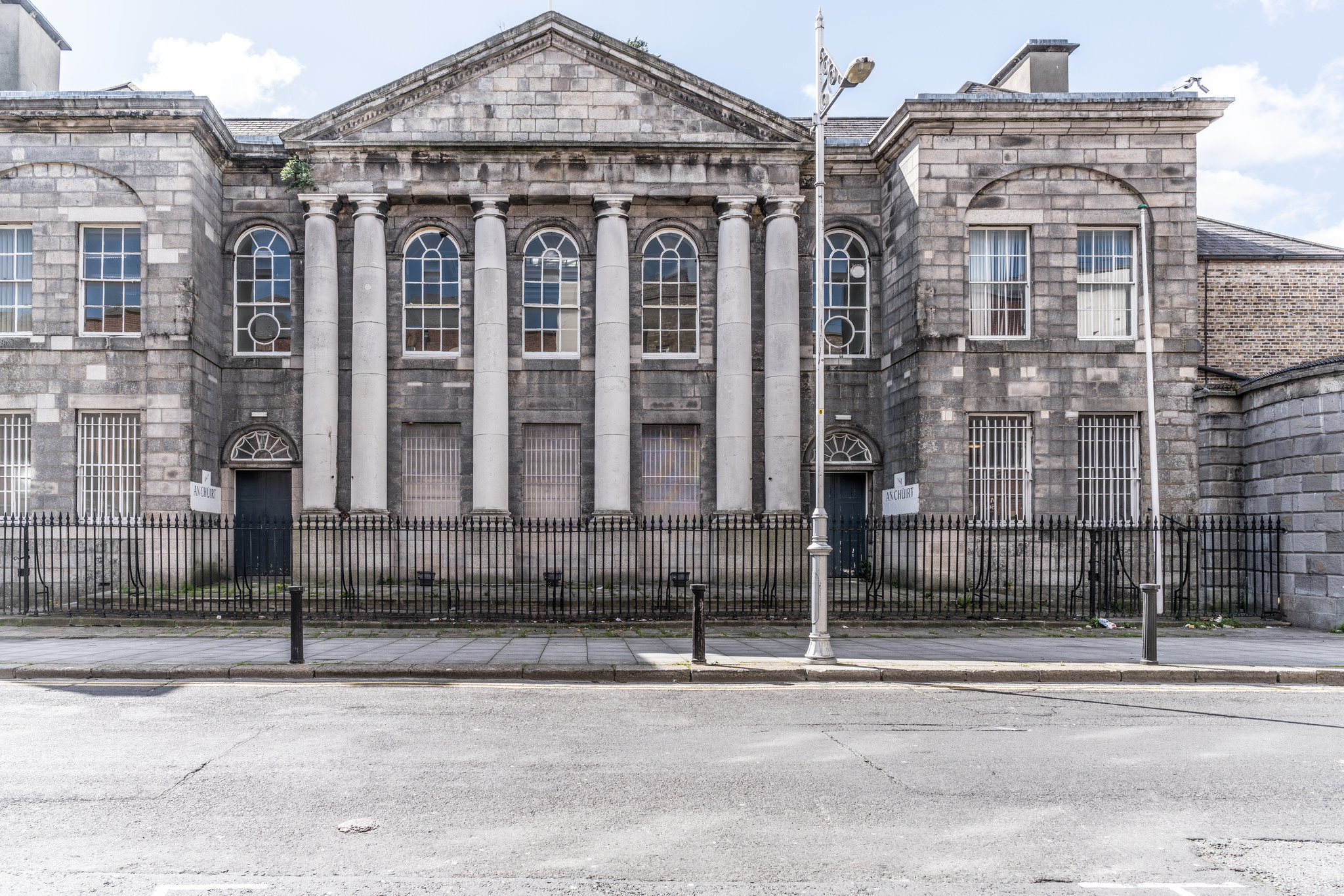
- Green Street Courthouse

- Location within Central Dublin

General information
- Architectural style: Neoclassical style
- Location: Green Street, Smithfield, Dublin, Ireland
- Coordinates: 53.349778°N 6.270866°W
- Completed: 1797

Design and construction
- Architect: Whitmore Davis

Green Street Courthouse (Irish: Teach Cúirte Shráid na Faiche) is a courthouse between Green Street and Halston Street in the Smithfield area of Dublin, Ireland. It was the site of many widely discussed criminal trials from 1797 until 2010, when the Criminal Courts of Justice building opened.

== Under British rule ==
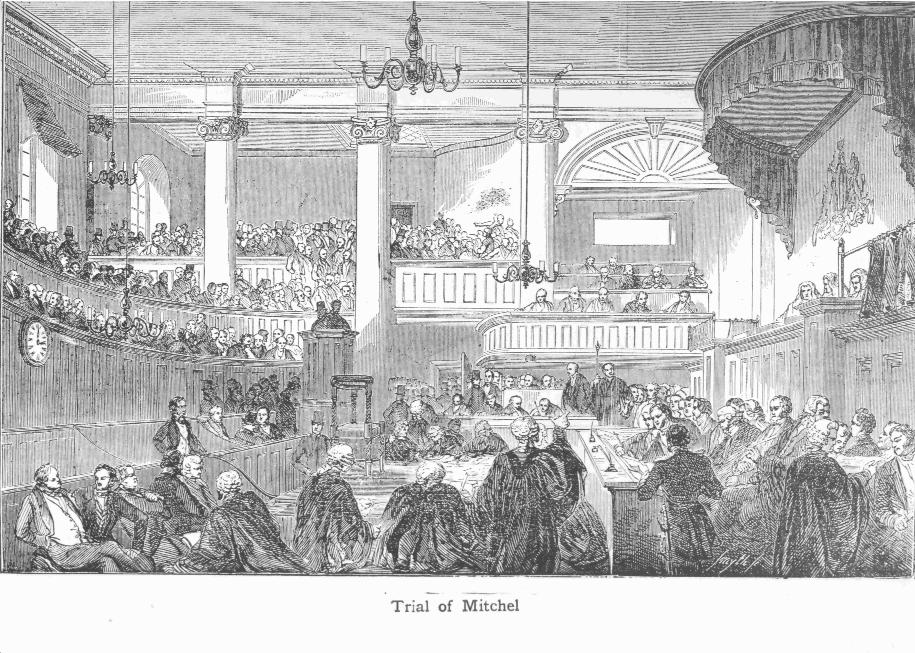
1848 trial of John Mitchel

The Dublin City Sessions House, which was designed in the neoclassical style and built in ashlar stone, was completed in 1797, on part of the "Little Green", which had been owned by St. Mary's Abbey before the Dissolution of the Monasteries, and was later used as a graveyard. The previous sessions house was the Tholsel, beside the Church of St. Nicholas Within. The architect of the new Sessions House is believed to have been Whitmore Davis. The design involved a symmetrical main frontage facing Smithfield; the central section featured a large hexastyle portico with Doric order columns supporting an entablature and a modillioned pediment.

The building held different courts, including the Dublin Commission Court (for the city and county, similar to the assizes held in other Irish counties), the city quarter sessions, and the courts of the Lord Mayor, the Sheriff, and the Recorder. The courthouse was part of a complex which also included three prisons — Newgate (completed 1781), the Sheriff's Prison (completed 1794), and the City Marshalsea (completed 1804) — and the Governor of Newgate's residence. The Newgate prison replaced the original county gaol of the county of the city of Dublin, which was located at the New Gate of the city wall. Which prison a convict or remanded defendant stayed in depended on the court and crime; besides those on Green Street there was Richmond Bridewell south of the Liffey, and Kilmainham Gaol west of the city took prisoners from the County Commission Court. (Kilmainham Courthouse held the county quarter sessions). Because the courthouse held Commission Courts for both County Dublin and the county of the city, it was legally treated as part of both counties.

Green Street Courthouse was the venue of trials of noted Irish republican rebels, including Robert Emmet in 1803, John Mitchel in 1848, and Fenian leaders later. As well as holding trials, the Sessions House was the venue for election of members of the UK parliament for the Dublin City constituency.

== Independence ==
After the 1922 creation of the Irish Free State, Green Street housed the Central Criminal Court established by the Courts of Justice Act 1924 to try murder and other serious crimes. Except during the Civil War (1922–23) and the Emergency (1939–45), all death sentences were handed down in Green Street.

The Special Criminal Court (SCC), for terrorism and organised crime, was revived in 1972 in response to the Troubles in Northern Ireland, and thereafter sat in Green Street. People convicted there include republicans Martin McGuinness in 1973, Colm Murphy in 2001, and Michael McKevitt in 2009; anarchists Marie and Noel Murray in 1976; and gangster John Gilligan in 2001. The Courthouse was modified for the February 1976 trial of the kidnappers of Tiede Herrema. On 16 July 1976, three IRA bombs exploded at the Courthouse, breaching a sidedoor and allowing the escape of five on trial for bombmaking. Four were apprehended in the vicinity.

The courthouse was one of only two in the state to have a dock for the accused. The last criminal trial at Green Street was on 11 December 2009, with the newly opened Criminal Courts of Justice building hosting trials from the start of 2010. The Green Street Courthouse building is still used by the Courts Service for juvenile custody summary hearings, and for administration, including the Drug Treatment Court Programme Office and the Reform and Development Office.

== See also ==
- Debtors' Prison Dublin
- Newgate Prison, Dublin
