= Powerscourt House =

Powerscourt House may refer to:

- Powerscourt House, Dublin, Ireland, a townhouse and shopping centre
- A house on Powerscourt Estate near Enniskerry, County Wicklow, Ireland

== See also ==
- Powerscourt (disambiguation)
