= David Dickinson (disambiguation) =

David Dickinson (born 1941) is an English antiques expert and television presenter.

David Dickinson may also refer to:

- David W. Dickinson (1808–1845), U.S. representative from Tennessee
- David T. Dickinson (1867–1930), mayor of Cambridge, Massachusetts
- David Dickinson (cricketer) (1929–1997), English cricketer
- David Dickinson, author of the Lord Francis Powerscourt Mysteries series of novels
- David Dickinson (academic), American scholar

== See also ==
- Dave Dickenson (born 1973), Canadian football player
