= Foster Place =

Street in Dublin, Ireland

- Parliament Row
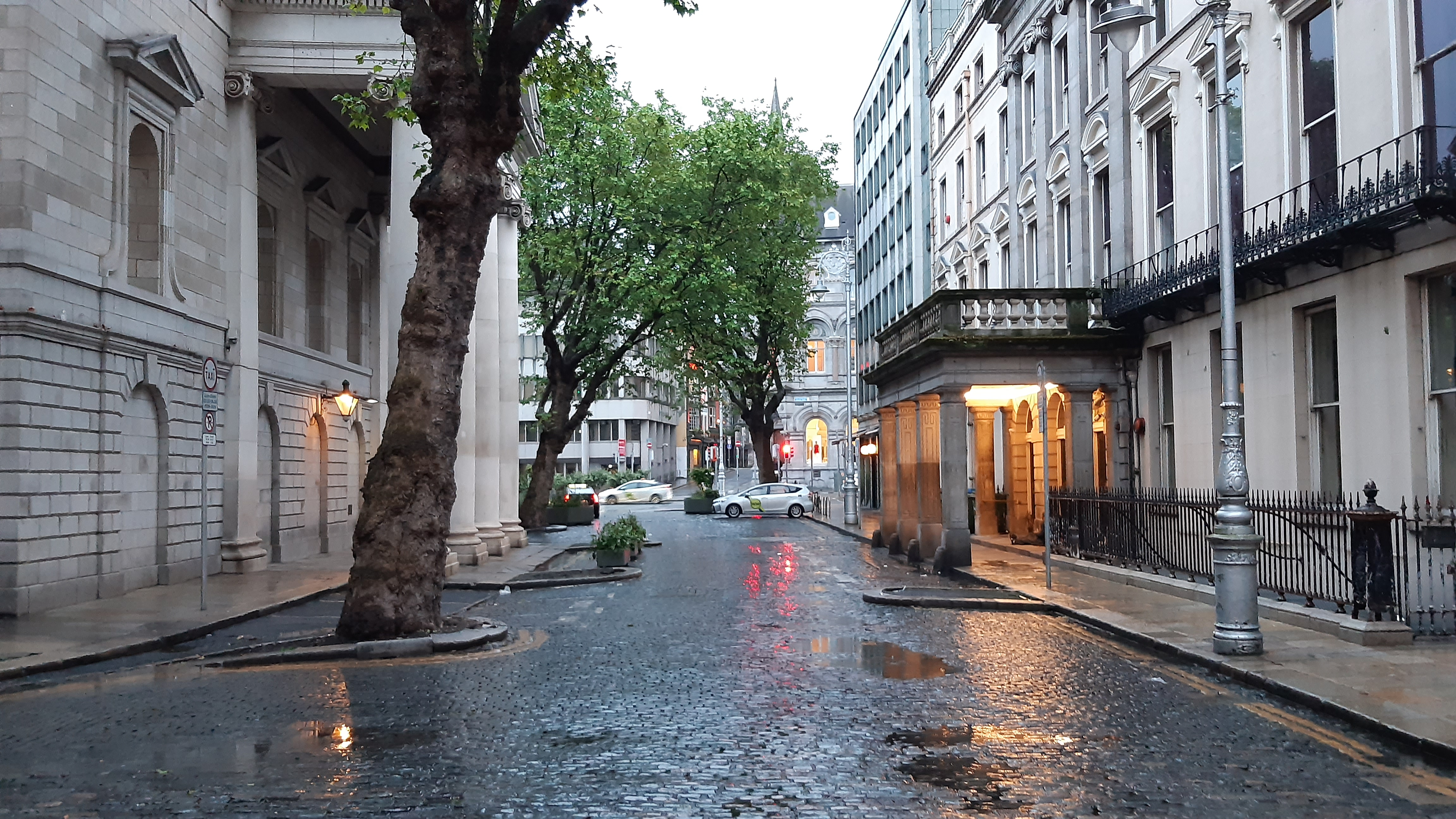
- Facing south towards Dame Street
- Interactive map of Foster Place
- Native name: Plás Foster (Irish)
- Former name: Turnstile Alley (until circa 1780)
- Part of: Temple Bar
- Namesake: John Foster, 1st Baron Oriel
- Location: Dublin, Ireland
- Postal code: D02
- Coordinates: 53°20′42″N 6°15′40″W
- South end: Dame Street

Construction
- Construction start: 1780s
- Completed: 1820s

Other
- Designer: Richard Johnston
- Known for: Georgian architecture Parliament House

Foster Place (Irish: Plás Foster) is a Georgian street in Dublin, Ireland, laid out by the Wide Streets Commissioners in the 1780s to coincide with the new western wing and extension of Parliament House and a new entrance for the House of Commons. It replaced a narrow lane named Turnstile Alley which had been in the same location and connected at the rear of Parliament house to Parliament Row and ultimately to Fleet Street.

The lane was also intersected to its west by Blackmore Yard which connected with Anglesea Street and extended to Cope Street. This was later blocked off entirely in the early 19th century.

As of 2025, the street is a cul-de-sac covered with setts and connects only with Dame Street and College Green.

== History ==
The street is clearly marked but left unnamed at the time of Charles Brooking's map of Dublin (1728). It is later annotated as Turnstile Alley on John Rocque's maps of 1756-60 where it extends fully to connect with Temple Bar at Fleet Street. It appears that for parts of the 18th century, it was also referred to as Parliament Row.

The street was renamed for John Foster, 1st Baron Oriel, who served three times as Chancellor of the Exchequer of Ireland and was also the last Speaker of the Irish House of Commons before its dissolution in 1800.

All of the current buildings on the street were designed by either Francis Johnston or Richard Johnston with the exception of the wing and extension of Parliament House which was designed by James Gandon although this may have had some input also from Robert Parke before his death in 1792. Substantial elements of all original Georgian buildings remain to the current day.

The original masterplan for the street in the files of the Wide Streets Commissioners was completed by Richard Johnston.

By the time of Thom's Alamanac of 1862, the buildings were in possession of a variety of professional services practitioners including solicitors, notaries, stockbrokers and bankers.

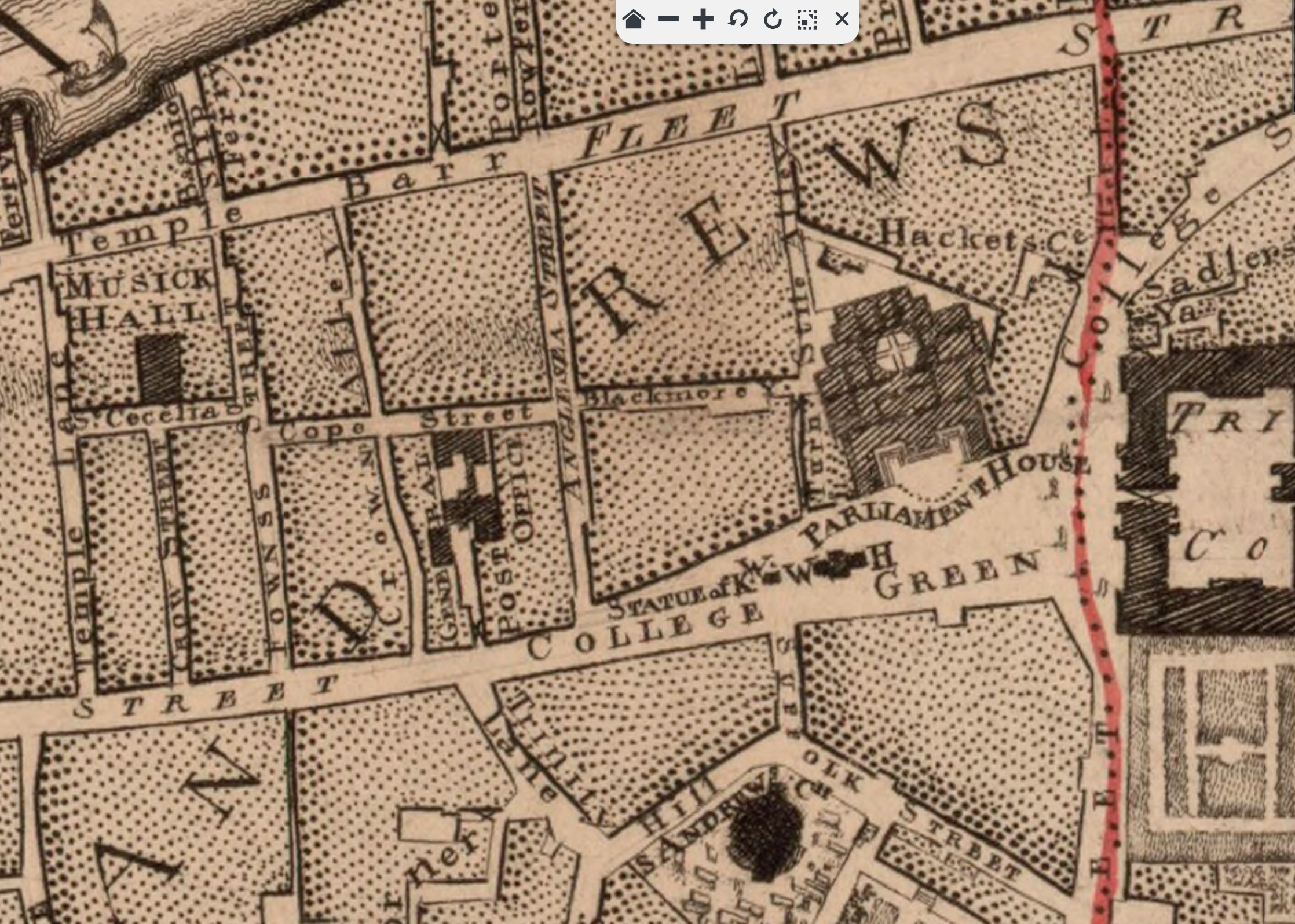
1757 map Post Office in Cope Street Dublin

== List of buildings on the street ==
Building	Year constructed	Architect	Older image	Modern Image	Status	Notes
The Armoury	1808-11	Francis Johnston			Protected Structure	Constructed as the guard house and armoury for the bank and later the offices of the Currency Commission and in recent years bought by the Irish Stock Exchange.
Daly's Club	1789-90	Richard Johnston			Protected Structure	Both of the wings of the original Daly's clubhouse building have now been demolished and reconstructed on two separate occasions in the 19th and 20th centuries. The central element remains with an additional roof story. It was originally opened with a grand dinner on 16 February 1791.
Stamp and Imprint Offices	1790-91	Richard Johnston			Protected Structure	Built as the Stamp and Imprint office but only ever used as the associated Account and Army Account Office. The Stamp Office itself moved Powerscourt House in 1811 from its previous location on Eustace Street. It was later used partially by Daly's Club and the Hibernian United Services Club before being used as a branch of the Royal Bank of Ireland which was later subsumed into AIB.
5 and 6 Foster Place	1821	Francis Johnston			Protected Structure	Twin houses and the last buildings constructed on the street broadly to the original masterplan design of Richard Johnston although apparently executed by his brother Francis for the Bank of Ireland. Number 5 houses the offices of An Taisce.
West wing of Parliament House	1782-89	James Gandon, Robert and Edward Parke			Protected Structure	The earliest and grandest structure on the street is the western wing and entrance to Parliament House being an addition by James Gandon and Robert and Edward Parke to Edward Lovett Pearce's earlier masterpiece. It was later again altered by Francis Johnston for the Bank of Ireland.

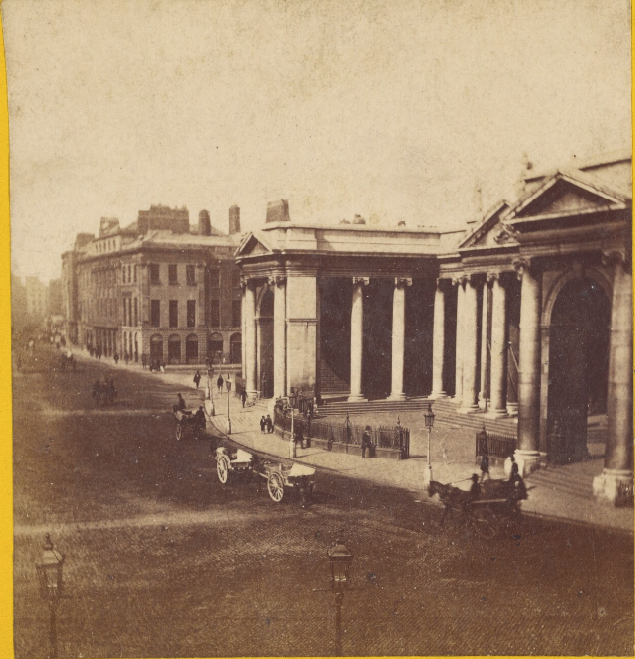
A photo of College Green circa 1860 showing the unified facade of Daly's clubhouse, and the Stamp Office on the corner of College Green and Foster Place.
