= State Heraldic Museum =

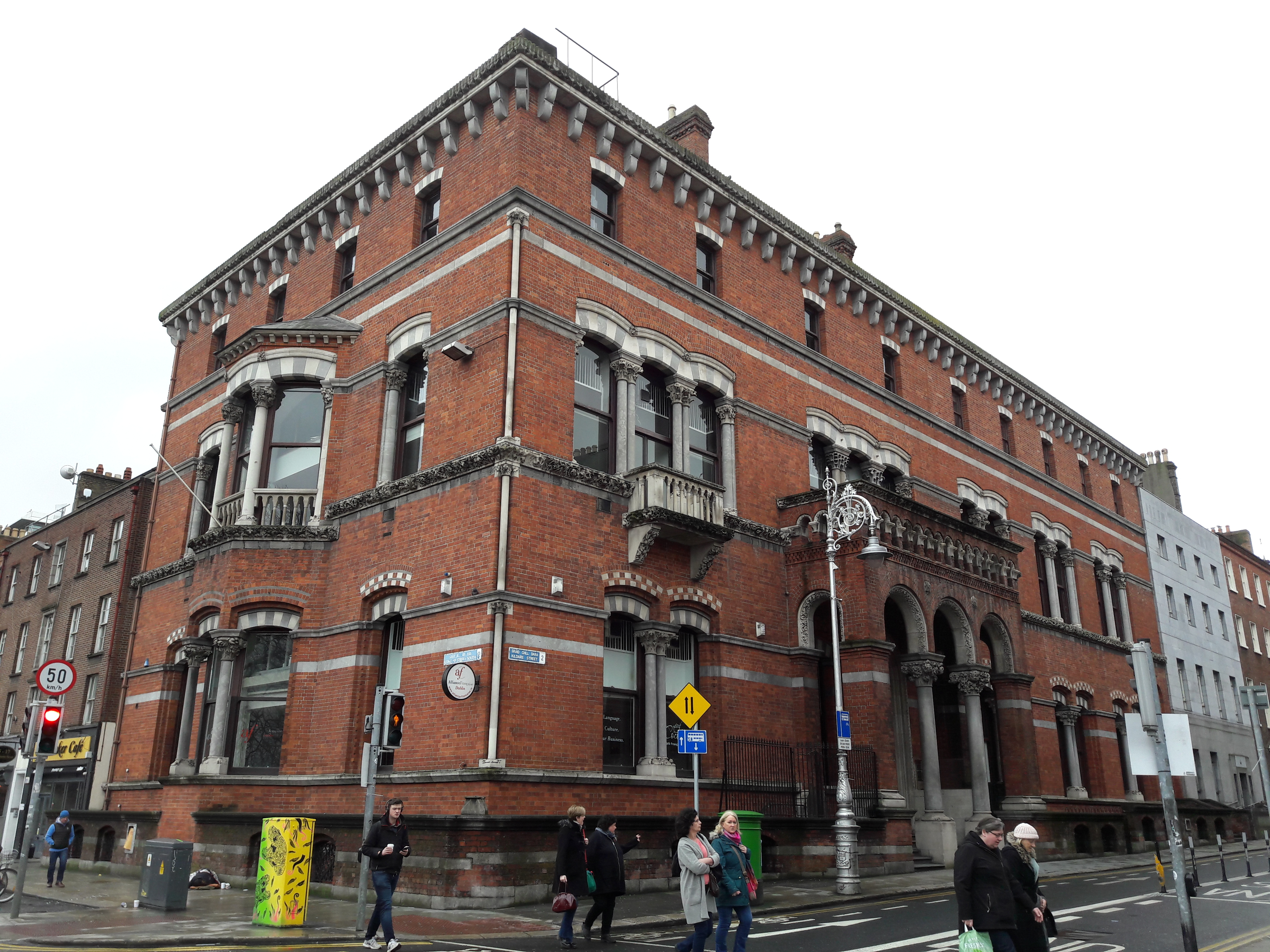
- Former museum site on Kildare Street in Dublin

- Location within Central Dublin
- Established: 1909
- Dissolved: 2007
- Location: 2–3 Kildare Street, Dublin, Ireland
- Coordinates: 53.341803°N 6.254515°W
- Type: Heraldic museum

The State Heraldic Museum in Kildare Street, Dublin, was founded in 1909 and was, prior to its closure in 2007, one of the oldest such museums in the world. Up to 2007, it was housed in part of the building occupied by the Office of the Chief Herald of Ireland, in the former Coffee Room of the Kildare Street Club.

Among its exhibits were representations of corporate and civic arms and the heraldic banners of the Chiefs of the Name. It also displayed arms of Ireland which once hung in the Houses of Parliament in College Green, a police notice on information on the 1907 theft of the Irish crown jewels, the funeral hatchment of Daniel O'Connell used on his hearse, the Irish Lord Chancellor's purse, and other items showing the use of heraldry.

The heraldic exhibition items were reportedly due to be moved "before the end of 2007" to make way for a replacement exhibition marking the 400th anniversary of the Flight of the Earls.
