= Chief Herald of Ireland =

Office of the Government of Ireland

- Incumbent; Audrey Whitty since 2025
- Inaugural holder: Edward MacLysaght
- Formation: 1943
- Website: Chief Herald

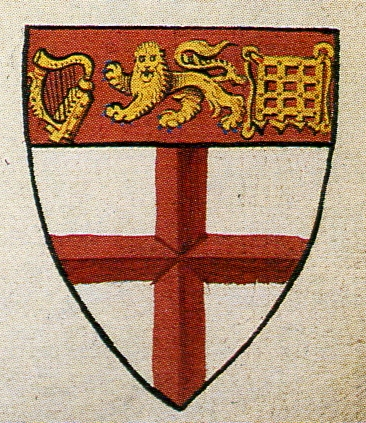
The coat of arms of Ulster King of Arms, who preceded the Chief Herald of Ireland. Taken from Lant's Roll

The Genealogical Office is an office of the Government of Ireland containing genealogical records. It includes the Office of the Chief Herald of Ireland (Irish: Príomh Aralt na hÉireann), the authority in Ireland for heraldry. The Chief Herald authorises the granting of arms to Irish bodies and Irish people, including descendants of emigrants. The office was constituted on 1 April 1943 as successor to the Ulster King of Arms, established during the Tudor period of the Kingdom of Ireland in 1552. The Ulster King of Arms' duties in relation to Northern Ireland were taken over by the Norroy and Ulster King of Arms.

As of 2026, a notice on the website of the Office of the Chief Herald stated that the office is "currently not accepting any new applications for grants or confirmations of arms [...or...] in a position to answer general queries about heraldry".

== Administration ==
The Genealogical Office was based in Dublin Castle until 1981. It was made part of the Department of Education in 1943. In 1987 it relocated to Kildare Street, occupying part of the former Kildare Street Club premises beside the National Library of Ireland (NLI). It was formally recognised as part of the NLI in 1997. In 2002, it was transferred from Education to the Department of Arts, Sport and Tourism.

The State Heraldic Museum was housed in the Genealogical Office until its closure in 2007.

== Jurisdiction ==
The tradition of the Irish abroad seeking grants of arms from the Chief Herald continues to the present. The office accepts petitions for grants of arms from the following:

- A citizen of Ireland or a person who has an entitlement to become a citizen.
- A person resident in the state for at least the five-year period immediately before the date of the application.
- A public or local authority, corporate body or other entity which has been located or functioning in Ireland for at least five years.
- An individual, corporate body or other entity, not resident or located in Ireland but who or which has substantial historical, cultural, educational, financial or ancestral connections with Ireland.

An application for a grant of arms should be made to the Chief Herald, on a prescribed form, setting out, in the case of a personal application, basic personal information and accompanied by supporting certificates or other appropriate documents. For a grant of arms to a corporate body or other entity, the application should include information about the legal status (if any) of the organisation, its structure, its activities and business, the length of time during which it has operated and, if relevant, information about membership. Where appropriate, a certified copy of the resolution of the council, board, or other controlling body should be submitted. If an application appears to be in order the matter is considered in detail by a herald of arms who will consult with the applicant about possible designs. A preliminary painting is then made for the approval of the applicant who will also be shown a draft of the letters patent. The final document is issued on vellum and includes a hand-painted exemplification of the arms. The grant of arms is recorded in the Register of Arms and is a matter of public record.

In November 1945 the Chief Herald granted the coat of arms of Ireland to the state itself.

At the request of the Irish government grants of arms were made to US presidents John F. Kennedy in 1963 and Bill Clinton in 1995. (Note: Mr Clinton's arms are blazoned thus: Or a lion rampant gules charged with three bars argent holding in the dexter paw a branch of olive proper between in the dexter chief and sinister base a cross crosslet fitchée sable and in the sinister chief and dexter base a shamrock slipped vert. And the Crest: An anchor erect azure on the stock the letters SPES argent. With the Motto: An leon do bheir an chraobh (English: The lion who bears away the branch))

== Titles of nobility ==
Article 40.2.1° of the Constitution of Ireland prohibits the conferral of a new title of nobility by the State, and Article 40.2.2° prohibits acceptance by any citizen of any title of nobility or of honour "without the prior approval of the Government."

The Constitution does not prohibit the granting of honours, other than titles of nobility, by the State. The Constitution is also silent as to untitled nobility. The Government acknowledges titles of nobility that have in the past derived from the British Crown as the fount of honour then exercising sovereignty over Ireland, and in fact, such titles continue to be mentioned in confirmations of arms by the Chief Herald of Ireland.

== Chiefs of the Name ==
When the Kingdom of Ireland was created in 1541, the Dublin administration wanted to involve the Gaelic chiefs in the new entity, creating new titles for them such as the Baron Upper Ossory, Earl of Tyrone, or the Barons Inchiquin. In the process, they were granted new coats of arms from 1552. The associated policy of surrender and regrant involved a change to succession to a title by primogeniture, and not by tanistry where a group of male cousins of a chief were eligible to succeed by election. This was accepted by the new title-holders, but not by some of their cousins. Thereafter the chiefs of the name succeeded by primogeniture for several centuries, in a similar way to the clan chiefs in Scotland.

Many other clan chiefs were never given formal titles or knighthoods from the Kingdom of Ireland, but were issued with arms and usually registered their genealogies with the heralds in Dublin, and became a significant part of the landed gentry.

After the Battle of Kinsale in 1601 and the subsequent Flight of the Earls, some dozens of the old Gaelic aristocracy scattered throughout Catholic Europe. Some of their descendants were granted courtesy recognition in 1943 by the Chief Herald as Chiefs of the Name, signifying that they were the senior male line descendant from the last recognised chief of the name.

The issue of the chiefs' succession arose again after the creation of the Chief Herald of Ireland in 1943. Some Chiefs of the Name favoured tanistry, while others saw primogeniture as a more practical system. In 1944–45, fifteen Chiefs of the Name were recognised by the Chief Herald, Edward MacLysaght, who had researched their lineages. In an address to the Irish Senate in December 2006, John O'Donoghue then Minister for Arts, Sport and Tourism, expressed the opinion that it was a matter for those who bore these titles to decide on the system they used for succession, but that he found it strange that an English system had been used for the succession of titles originally created under a native Irish system.

Following advice from the Attorney General that the recognition of Chiefs of the Name was without basis in law, the practice of courtesy recognition was abandoned in July 2003.

== Questions over legal status of the office ==
Due reportedly to uncertainty concerning the legal validity of grants of arms in Ireland, the post of Chief Herald remained vacant from September 2003 until August 2005. It had been assumed that the prerogatives of the British Crown, including the power to grant arms, had been inherited after Irish independence in 1922.

While many functions had passed under the Irish Free State (Agreement) Act 1922 to the Provisional Government of the Irish Free State in April 1922, the pre-existing office of the Ulster King of Arms continued unchanged until 1943.

In May 2005 the government commenced section 13 of the National Cultural Institutions Act 1997. This enables the Board of the National Library to "designate a member of its staff to perform the duty of researching, granting and confirming coats of arms and such member shall use the appellation Chief Herald of Ireland or, in the Irish language, Príomh-Aralt na hÉireann, while performing such duties". While this was intended to legitimise the granting of arms in Ireland, it initiated a debate as to whether any grants made since 1943 were valid. These would include the 1945 grant of the coat of arms of Ireland to the state itself.

The Genealogy and Heraldry Bill 2006 was introduced into Seanad Éireann to reform the Office and provide a firm legal basis for grants and confirmations of arms. This bill was withdrawn on 12 December 2006 with the consent of the sponsoring senator and was referred to the board of the National Library for consideration by John O'Donoghue, the Minister for Arts, Sport and Tourism.

In September 2007 a notice was added to the National Library website noting the suspension of grants of arms until the legal situation was clarified. Following the receipt of legal advice, the Board of the National Library was "satisfied that it can exercise the heraldic powers conferred on it by the 1997 Act", and grants are again being made.

The Board did, however, note that "doubts exist regarding the legal basis of heraldic functions exercised in the State prior to the establishment of the Board" and that "with minor amendment, the wording of the Act could be made more succinct".

While the issue of the legality of grants of arms by the Chief Herald has been resolved, no penalties or jurisdiction have yet been legislated for to discourage anyone from designing and using a new coat of arms. The specific emblazonments of self-designed arms may be protected by the current copyright law of Ireland.

== Chief Heralds ==
- Edward MacLysaght (1943–54)
- Gerard Slevin (1954–81)
- Donal Begley (1981–95)
- Patricia Donlon (1995–97)
- Brendan O Donoghue (1997–2003)
- Post vacant 2003–05
- Fergus Gillespie (2005–2009)
- Colette O'Flaherty (2010–2025)
- Dr. Audrey Whitty (interim; 2025–)

== Costs of granting and preparing arms ==
Prior applicants have been expected to provide genealogical information including birth, marriage and death certificates back to an ancestor that bore arms. Alternatively, an entirely new grant of arms may be discussed and designed. From 7 October 2013, the cost of a Grant of Arms (or confirmation of a prior grant) had been:

- Individual €4,400
- Corporate bodies (Commercial) €17,250
- Local authorities, government offices and agencies €8,600
- Schools, clubs, professional associations and other non-profit organizations €8,600
