= Powerscourt =

Powerscourt may refer to:

- Powerscourt (horse) (born 2000), a thoroughbred racehorse
- Powerscourt cocktail, a brandy-based cocktail
- Powerscourt Covered Bridge, a Canadian McCallum truss bridge
- Powerscourt Estate, County Wicklow, Ireland
  - Powerscourt Golf Club, on the estate
- Powerscourt House, Dublin, a townhouse, interior is now a shopping centre
- Powerscourt Waterfall, Glensoulan Valley on the River Dargle, County Wicklow, Ireland
- Lord Francis Powerscourt, a fictional detective
- Viscount Powerscourt, a title in the Irish peerage
