= Richard Johnston (architect) =

Irish architect and property developer

Richard Johnston (1759 - 20 March 1806) was an Irish architect and property developer active in Dublin from at least October 1784.

== Early life ==
Johnston was born in Armagh, Ireland, the eldest son of William Johnston by his first marriage to Margaret Houston and older brother of architect Francis Johnston.

He married his cousin Susanna Barnes while his brother Francis married her sister Anne. Neither him nor his brother Francis are recorded as having any children with the assets remaining in their wills ultimately going to their half-brother Andrew Johnston.

He was recorded as living at 40 Dorset Street from 1792 to 1800 and 24 Eccles Street from 1801 to 1806.

He was buried at the Taney Parish churchyard in Dundrum, Dublin.

== Career ==
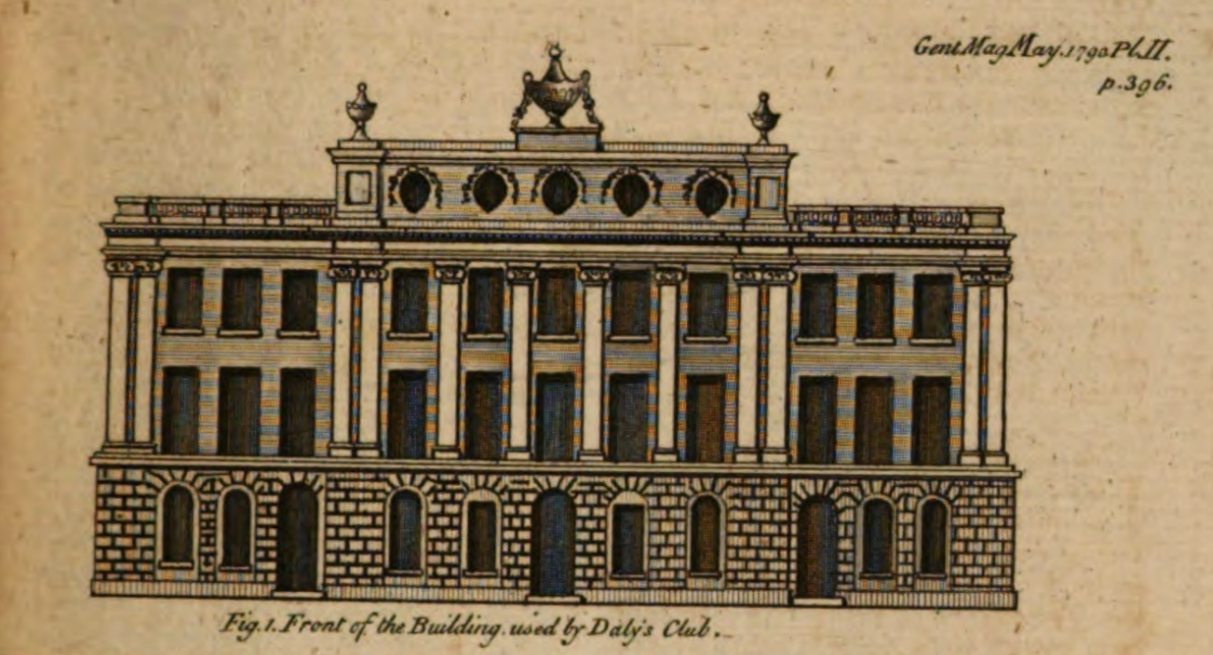
Daly's Club

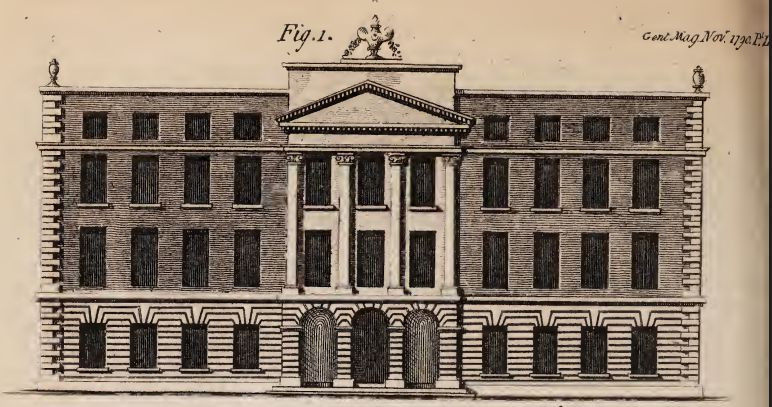
An illustration of the stamp and imprint office on Foster Place from the Gentleman's Magazine in 1790.

He is first recorded in Dublin as working on the Rotunda Assembly Rooms in October 1784-86 where he was the supervising architect based on a design by Frederick Trench which may have had some modifications by James Gandon.

He is later recorded as developing part of Eccles Street in 1793. A street in which he was later to live along with his brother Francis.

In 1789-90, he is recorded as presenting the design for the unified facade of Daly's Club on College Green and the Stamp and Imprint Office with frontage onto Foster Place although the building was only used for this purpose for a short time. It appears Johnston's design for Daly's Club was taken from a drawing submitted to the wide streets commissioners by a different unknown architect.

He carried out alterations to the Westmoreland Lock Hospital in 1792.

He was also likely the "Johnson" involved in designing and executing the building of Aldborough House from 1793 to 1796.
