= Ballynegall House =

Country house in County Westmeath, Ireland

Coordinates: 53.5775°N 7.3342°W

- Interactive map of the Ballynegall House area

General information
- Status: Ruined
- Type: Country house
- Architectural style: Regency
- Location: Ballynagall townland, County Westmeath, Ireland
- Year built: c. 1808
- Demolished: 1981 (gutted)
- Owner: James Gibbons (c. 1808–1846); James William Middleton Berry (1846–1855); Smyth family (1855–c. 1960s); Michael Hawkesworth Smyth (last owner of the Smyth family)

Design and construction
- Architect: Francis Johnston
- Known for: Considered one of Ireland's great architectural losses

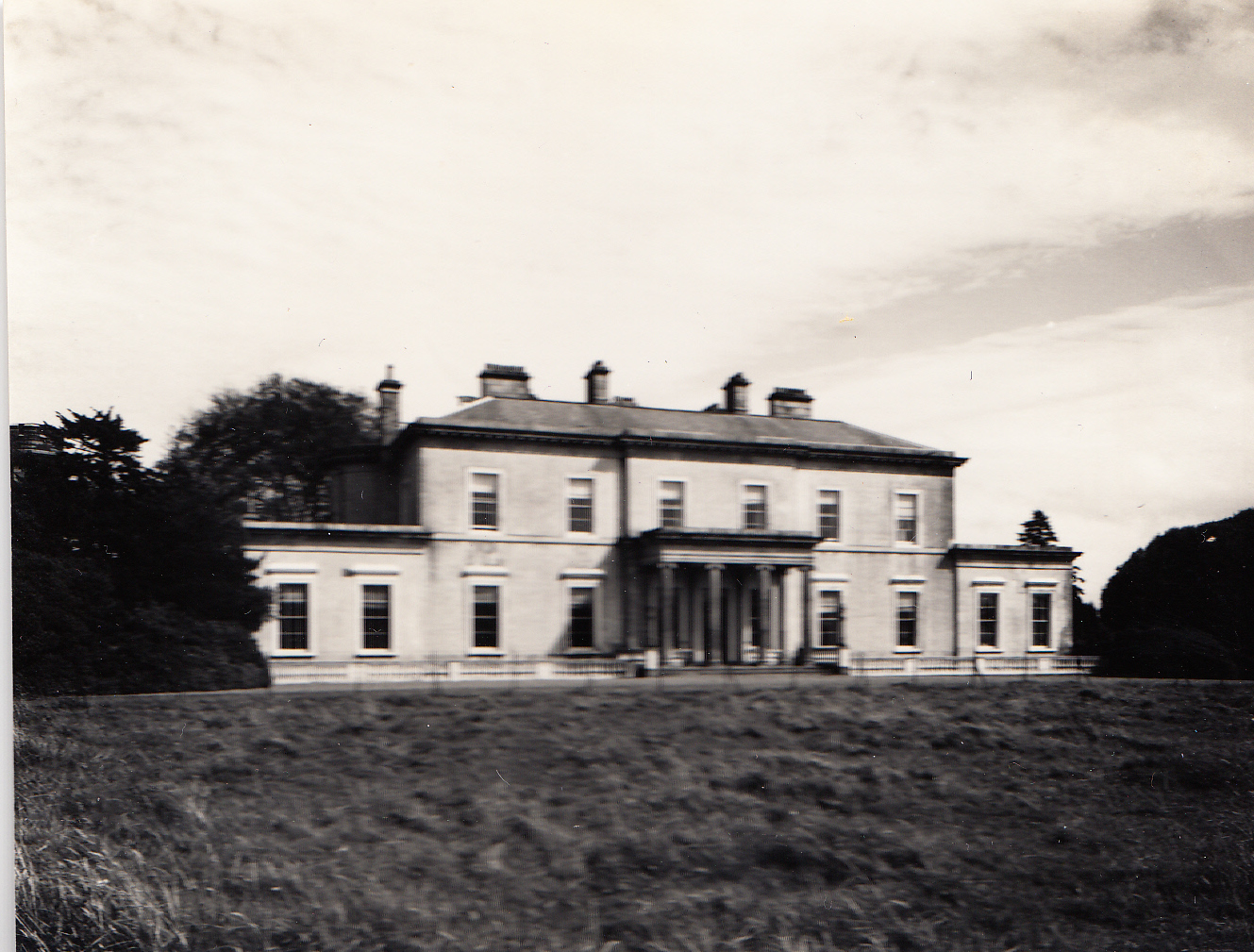
Ballynegall early 20c

Ballynegall House (sometimes spelled "Ballynagall") is a ruined Regency-style country house in Ballynagall townland, County Westmeath, Ireland. The house was constructed around 1808 and was designed by the architect Francis Johnston.

Its gutting and fall into ruins was said to be one of great architectural losses in Ireland.

== History ==
The house was originally built for James Gibbons and remained in the Gibbons name until 1846. James Gibbons died without issue and the house passed to James William Middleton Berry who in 1851 married Caroline Augusta Smith, daughter of Thomas Cusack-Smith but James then died suddenly in December 1855 while on a hunt. The house then passed to his in laws and it remained in the Smyth family until the early 1960s.

The last owner Michael Hawkesworth Smyth sold the house with several hundred acres of good farming land for about £12,000. It changed hands until in 1981 many of the fine architectural pieces were gutted and sold (the fireplace alone was reported sold for £6,000) the house became a ruin.

Many of the items from the house are still in existence today in other buildings: the fine portico found a new home at the entrance to the K Club, Straffan, County Kildare, and the Richard Turner conservatory at the La Serre restaurant on the Lyons Demesne, Celbridge, County Kildare.

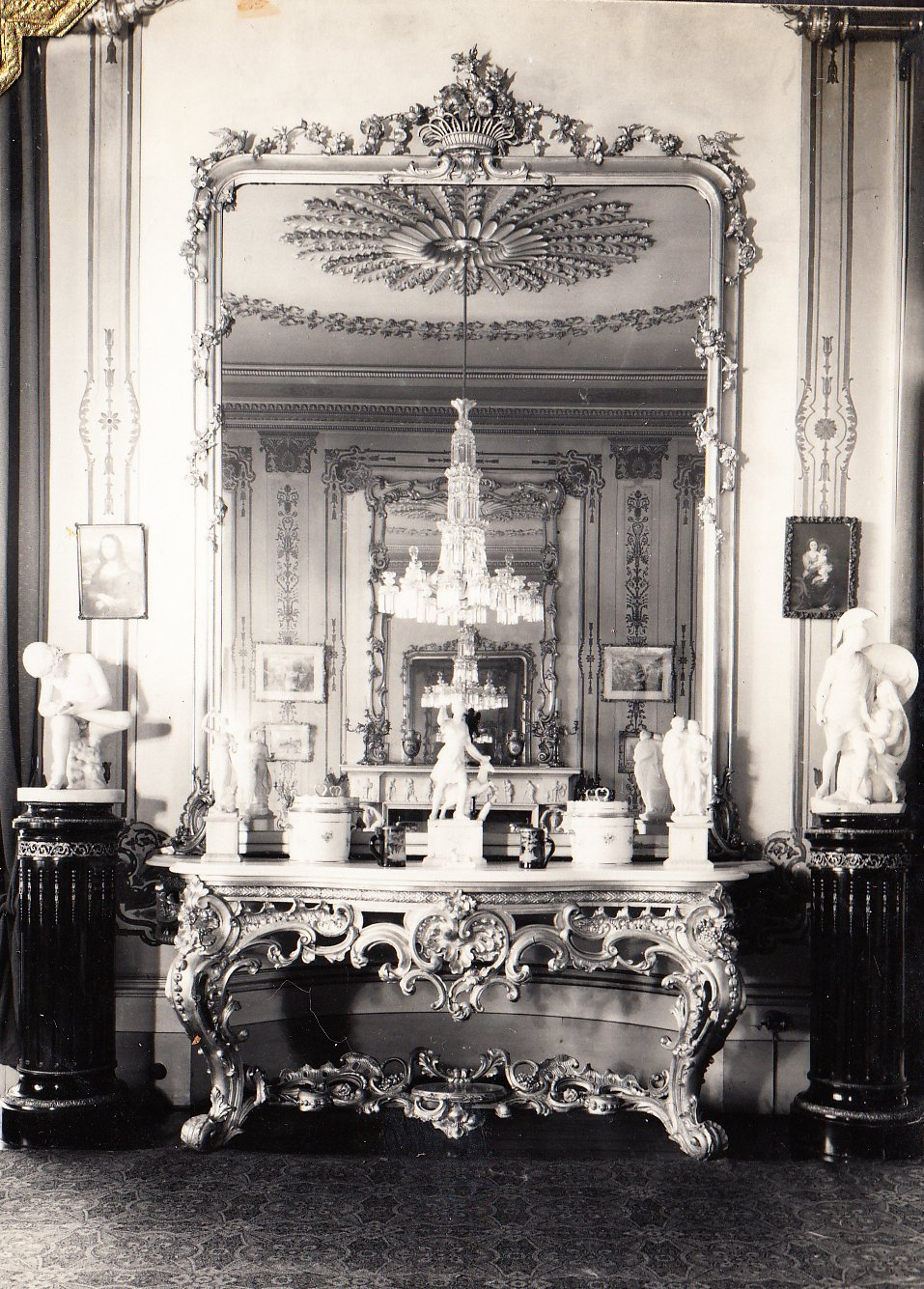

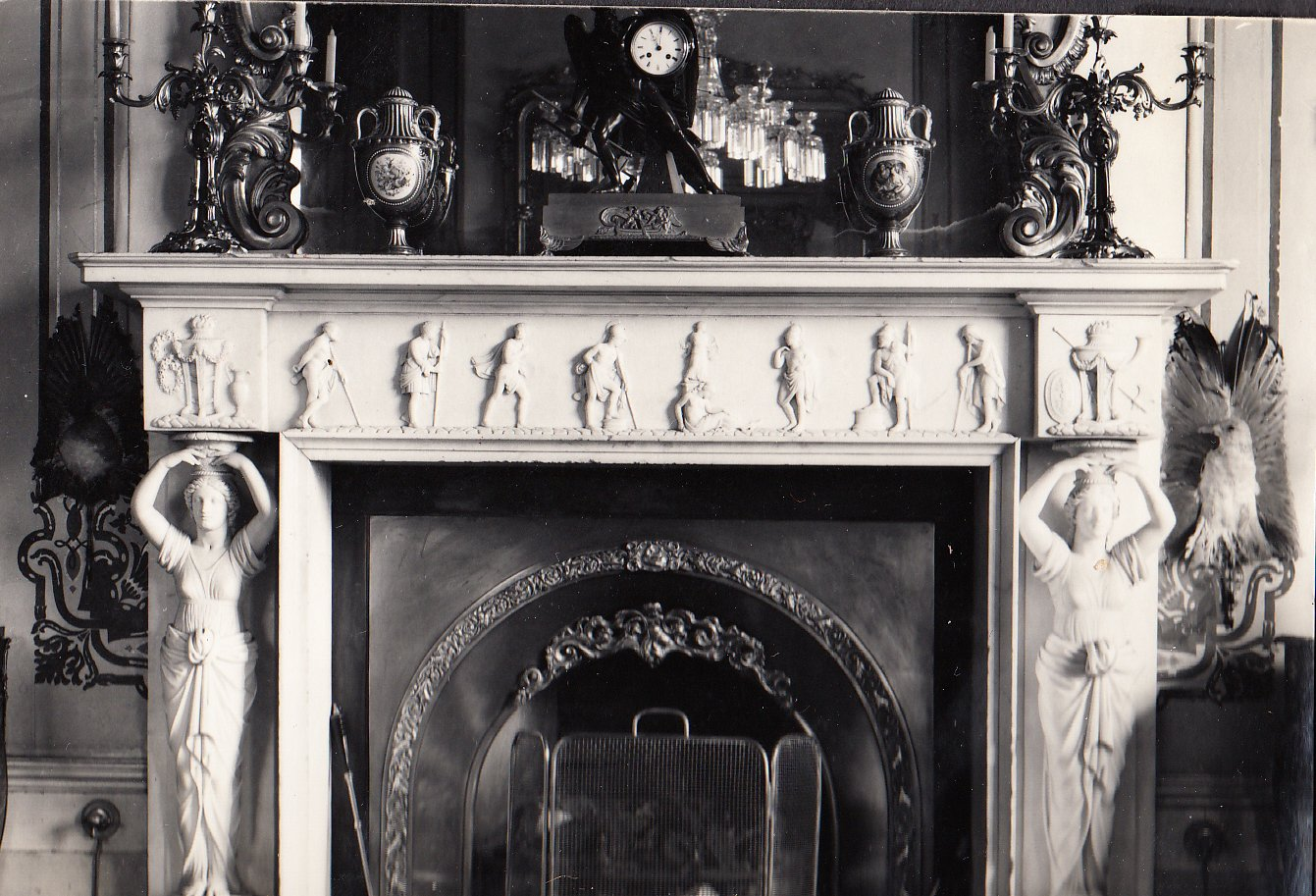
The fireplace was ripped out and reportedly sold for approximately half the value the whole estate was originally sold for

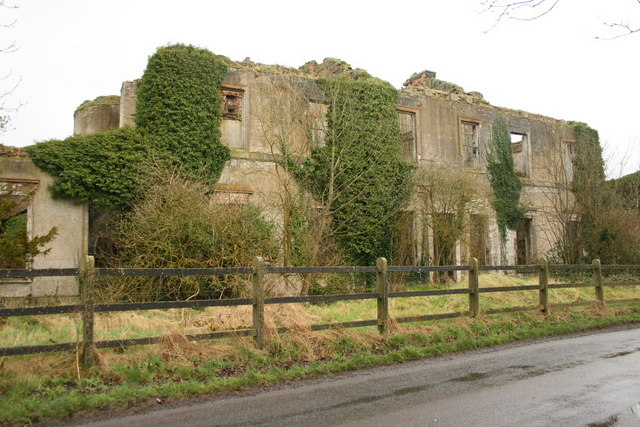
Ballynagall House in 2008
