= Andrew Johnston (surgeon) =

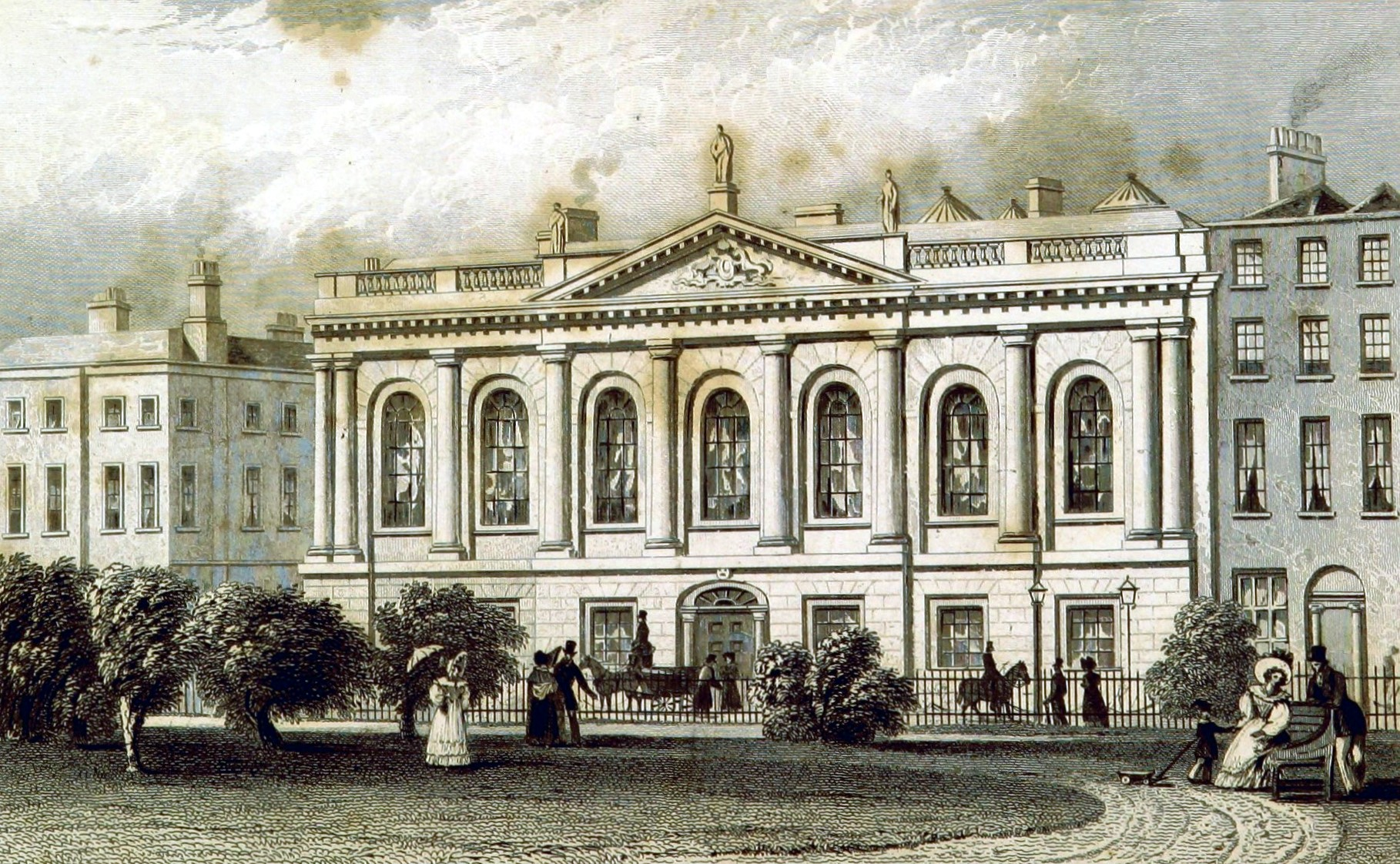
"The College of Surgeons, Dublin". 1837.

Andrew Johnston (1770 – 28 August 1833) was the president of the Royal College of Surgeons in Ireland (RCSI) in 1817.

He was a half-brother of the architects Francis Johnston and Richard Johnston through his father, the architect William Johnston.

== Career ==
Andrew Johnston was to surgeon William Hartigan in 1791 and he entered upon his professional studies in the Royal College of Surgeons in Ireland (RCSI), then situated in Mercer Street. On 3 December 1794, he passed the qualifying examination of the RCSI. He was commissioned as surgeon " to His Majesty's 44th Regiment, from the 1st Battalion of the Essex Regiment," and he served in the West Indies and also in Egypt.

He retired from the army in 1803, and was admitted to the Membership of RCSI in 1805.

He was elected in 1813 Professor of Surgical Pharmacy, and afterwards (in 1819) Professor of Midwifery.

For many years Johnston was Treasurer to the college.

He owned houses at Eccles Street which were developed along with his brother Francis.

Andrew married Sophie Cheney and had at least six sons and two daughters. His eldest son, named Francis Samuel Johnston, inherited most of the properties on Eccles Street and Abbey Street of his extended family including those of the architect Francis Johnston via his wife Anne's will while his second son also named Andrew Johnston is also mentioned in the will as well as Doctor George Johnston (1814–89) and the Reverend Richard Johnston.

His son George Johnston later became Master of the Lying in Hospital from 1868 to 1875.

== See also ==
- List of presidents of the Royal College of Surgeons in Ireland
