= Kildare Street Club =

Historical building and former member's club in Dublin, Ireland

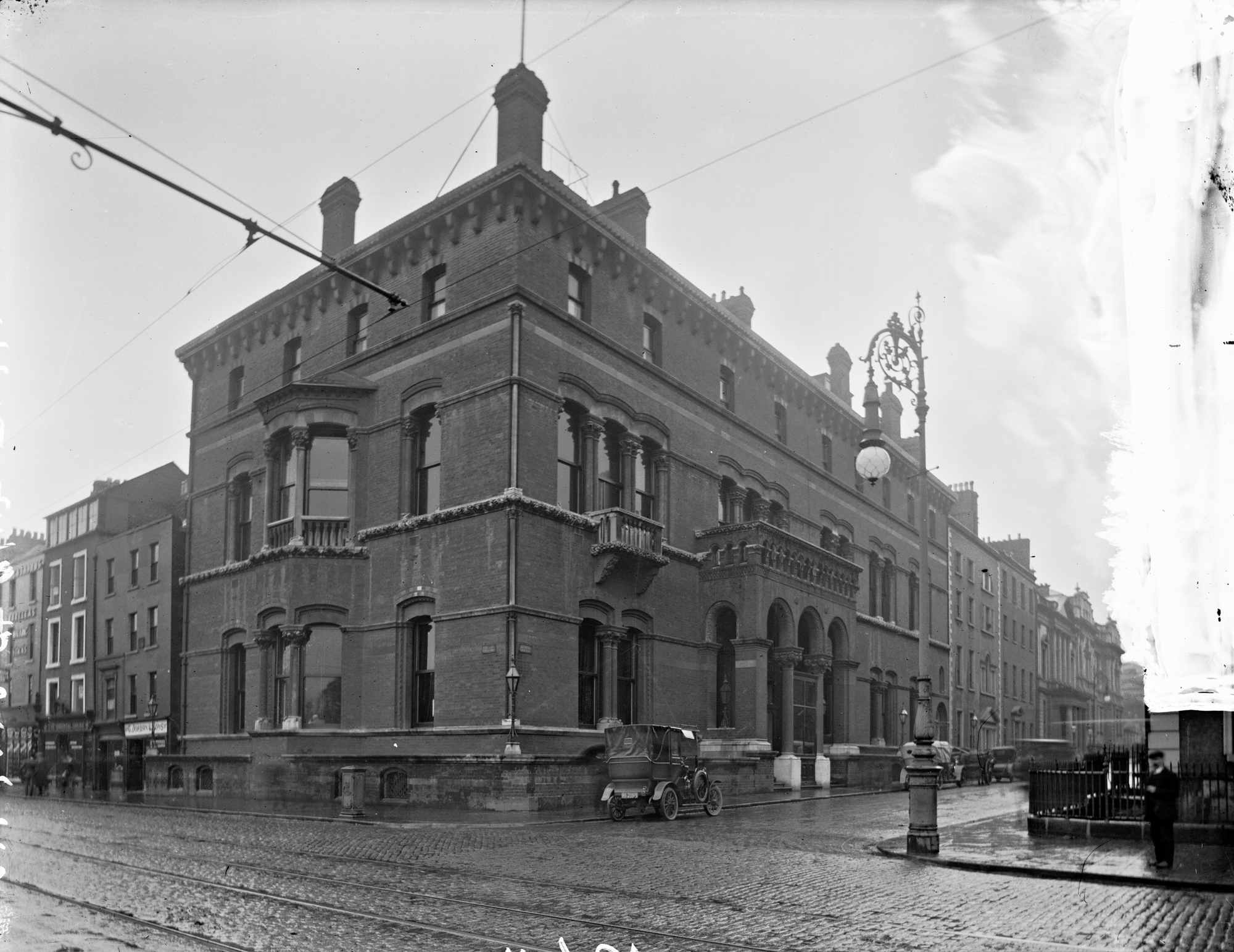
The building in the 1910s

The Kildare Street Club is a historical member's club in Dublin, Ireland, at the heart of the Anglo-Irish Protestant Ascendancy.

The club remained in Kildare Street between 1782 and 1977, when it merged with the Dublin University Club to become the Kildare Street & University Club, moving to the University Club's 1776 premises at number 17 on the North side of St Stephen's Green. Its second Kildare Street clubhouse, built between 1859 and 1860, has not been disposed of but, as of 2002, was leased to the Alliance Française.

== History ==
Founded in the year of the Constitution of 1782, the club's first home was a house in Kildare Street built by Sir Henry Cavendish on land bought from James FitzGerald, 20th Earl of Kildare, later first Duke of Leinster. In 1786 the club acquired an adjoining house also built by Cavendish, thus completing its original clubhouse.

There is a tradition that what prompted the foundation of the club was the blackballing of William Burton Conyngham at Daly's Club in Dame Street. This led to an exodus of members from Daly's, who formed a new club which soon rivalled their old one as a fashionable haunt and which in the end eclipsed it. A Dublin Tourism booklet from the mid-1990s maintains that the club was founded in 1782 "as a polite alternative to the notorious Daly's Club, then the most luxurious in Dublin."

Although by the later 19th century the club was closely associated with the Protestant Ascendancy and Irish Unionism, nevertheless its earliest members included men strongly opposed to the British connection, such as Sir Jonah Barrington, who argued against the creation in 1801 of a United Kingdom of Great Britain and Ireland.

In a famous incident at the Kildare Street Club in 1806, Earl Landaff, a supporter of Catholic Emancipation, denounced the "eighty-five scoundrels" who had blackballed his brother Montague James Mathew, and stalked out of the club, never to return.

By 1840, the club had some six hundred and fifty members, "a large and elegant card-room, coffee, reading, and billiard-rooms". There was a committee of fifteen members, elected annually. Admission to membership was by ballot, with an entrance fee of £26, 10s., and an annual subscription of £5.

In 1858, it was decided to build a new clubhouse, as the original premises at 6, Kildare Street, were now too small for the club's needs. In 1859, the club was described in The Building News as "an institution famous for aristocracy, claret and whist..." Between 1859 and 1860, the new clubhouse was built, designed by Thomas Newenham Deane and Benjamin Woodward, at a cost of some £21,000. This replaced three existing houses on Kildare Street and one on Leinster Street, which were demolished, giving an L-shaped new building, with an internal plan similar to that of the Reform Club in Pall Mall, London. The club committee had altered Deane and Woodward's original Italian Gothic design, insisting on large arched windows divided by thin columns, and the outcome was described as Byzantine. The new building is adorned by "whimsical beasts".

The club had planned to move from the old to the new building in 1861, but on 11 November 1860, there was a disastrous fire at the old clubhouse. Three maids died, and a fourth was saved by being at the time in the bedroom of the club accountant, from which she was rescued. All of the club's pictures and furniture and a library of fifteen thousand books were destroyed, and the club moved into its new building before completion.

In Parnell and his Island (1887), George Moore wrote scathingly of the club:

The Kildare Street Club is one of the most important institutions in Dublin. It represents in the most complete acceptation of the word the rent party in Ireland; better still, it represents all that is respectable, that is to say, those who are gifted with an oyster-like capacity for understanding this one thing: that they should continue to get fat in the bed in which they were born. This club is a sort of oyster bed into which all the eldest sons of the landed gentry fall as a matter of course. There they remain spending their days, drinking sherry and cursing Gladstone in a sort of dialect, a dead language which the larva-like stupidity of the club has preserved. The green banners of the League are passing, the cries of a new Ireland awaken the dormant air, the oysters rush to their window – they stand there open-mouthed, real pantomime oysters, and from the corner of Frederick Street, a group of young girls watch them in silent admiration.

Overwhelmingly Protestant and Anglo-Irish, in 1900 the club was called by a member "the only place in Ireland where one can enjoy decent caviar". It has been estimated that at about this time only between two and six per cent of the club's members were supporters of Irish Home Rule. The most popular Dublin club for the Irish Parliamentary Party was the Stephen's Green Club, while the Kildare Street Club was closely associated with the Irish Conservative Party and later the Irish Unionist Alliance.

== Redevelopment and reuse ==
After the partition of Ireland of 1921, and again after the Second World War, the Kildare Street Club found itself in decline. During The Troubles in Ulster (1920–1922) the club and the Masonic Order in Molesworth Street were commandeered by the Irish Republican Army and housed some of the hundreds of refugees from newly formed Northern Ireland. In 1976 it merged with the Dublin University Club, thereafter sharing the premises of the latter at 17, St Stephen's Green, under the name "Kildare Street and University Club". In 1967 the owner of the Kildare Street premises, Phoenix Assurance, sought permission to demolish half the building and replace it with an office block, having printed the notice in the newspapers in Irish. Dublin Corporation refused permission in June 1967. The next owners, Rampart Holdings, sought permission to redevelop the interior of the building in March 1971, and as only the exterior of the building was protected by a preservation order, this work was allowed to go ahead. The interior of the building was gutted, with the vaulted arcades, stone fireplaces, carved columns, staircase and flying buttresses removed. The work began in 1971, and was finished by 1973, having converted the interior to accommodate 1,440 square metres (15,500 ft^{2}) of office space.

As of 2002, the building was leased to the State Heraldic Museum and Genealogical Office and the Alliance française.

== Notable members ==
- Sir Jonah Barrington
- Lord Henry FitzGerald
- Arthur O'Connor of the Society of United Irishmen
- Field Marshal The 1st Duke of Wellington
- Viscount Castlereagh
- Sir Boyle Roche
- Thomas Conolly
- Sir William Gregory
- Field Marshal The 1st Viscount Gough, of the First Anglo-Sikh War
- Henry Arthur Herbert of Muckross
- The 2nd Earl of Erne
- The 3rd Earl of Enniskillen
- The 4th Earl of Longford
- The 1st Baron Ashbourne
- The 5th Earl of Longford
- The 1st Baron Rathmore
- The 2nd Earl of Dudley
- The 4th Earl of Bandon

== In fiction ==
In the genre of new Sherlock Holmes stories, Peter Tremayne's "The Affray at the Kildare Street Club" appeared in The Mammoth Book of New Sherlock Holmes Adventures (1997). The story is set in 1873, when before going up to Oxford Holmes is visiting Trinity College, Dublin. He solves the theft at the Kildare Street Club of a hair-brush from an Irish duke.

The first two chapters of John Banville's novel The Secret Guests (1920) are set in the Kildare Street Club.

== Club Soda ==
The 'club' in club soda refers to the Kildare Street Club, which commissioned Cantrell & Cochrane to produce it under trademark in 1877.

== Gallery ==
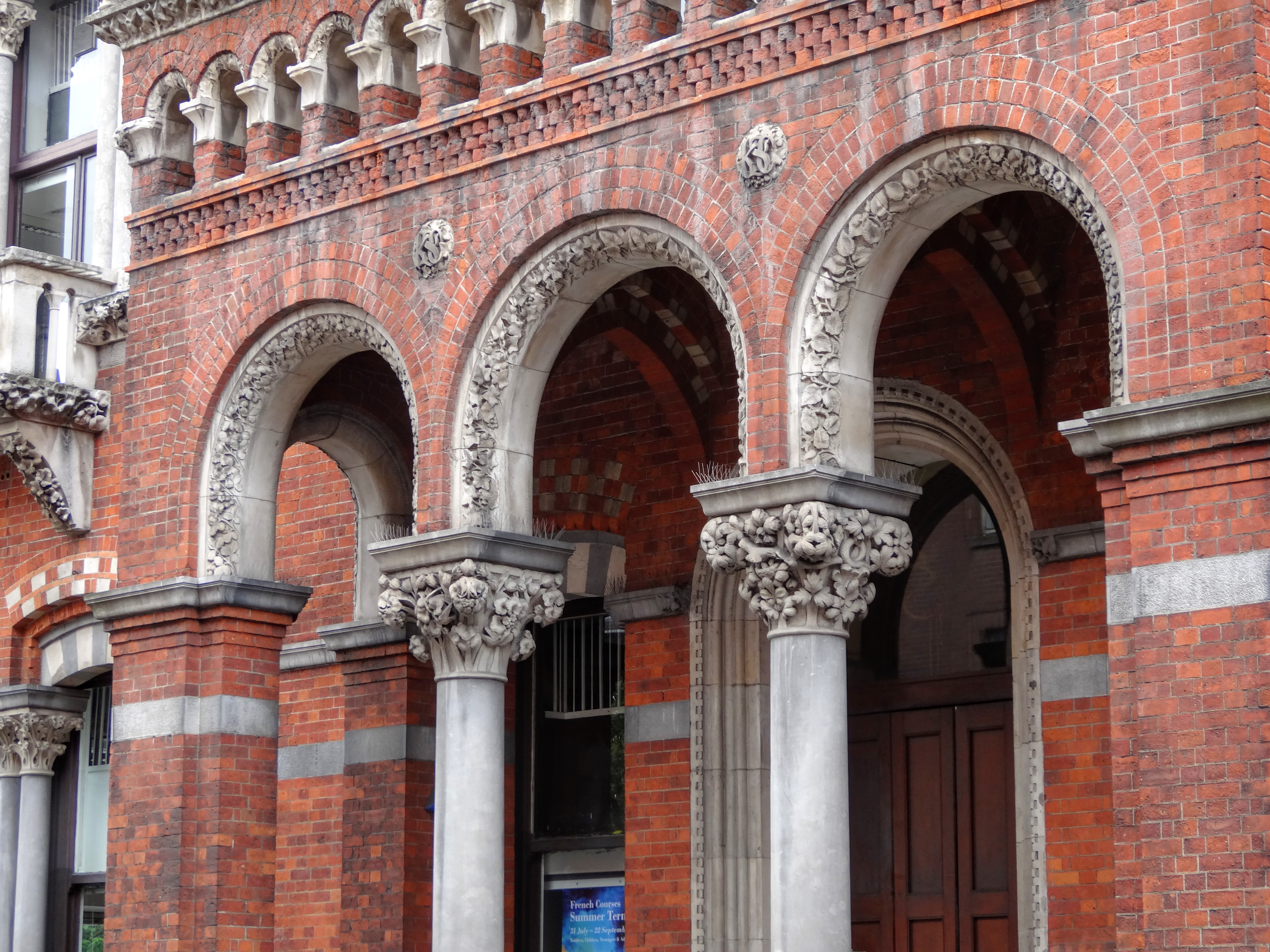
Portico of the building

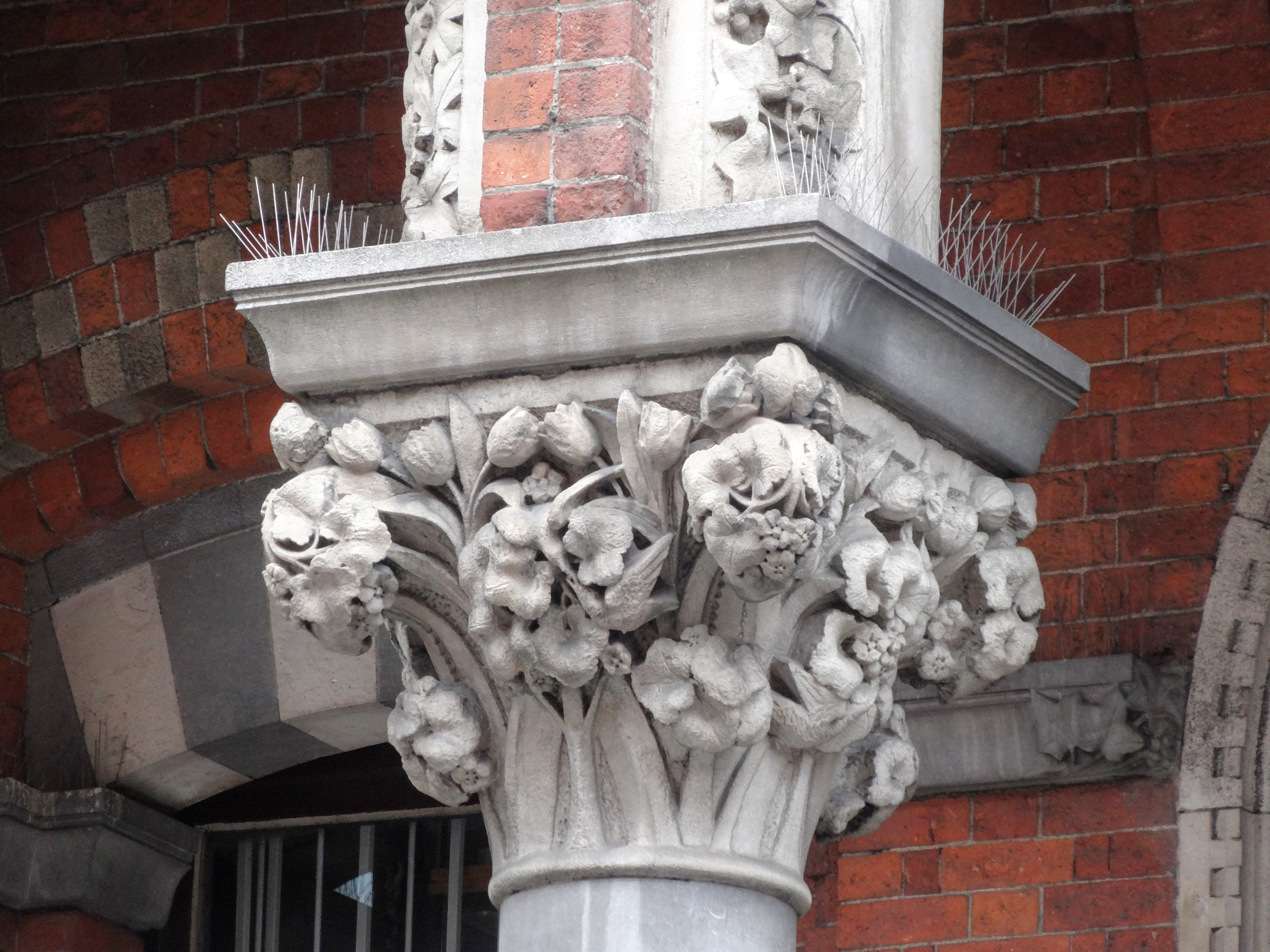
Carved capital

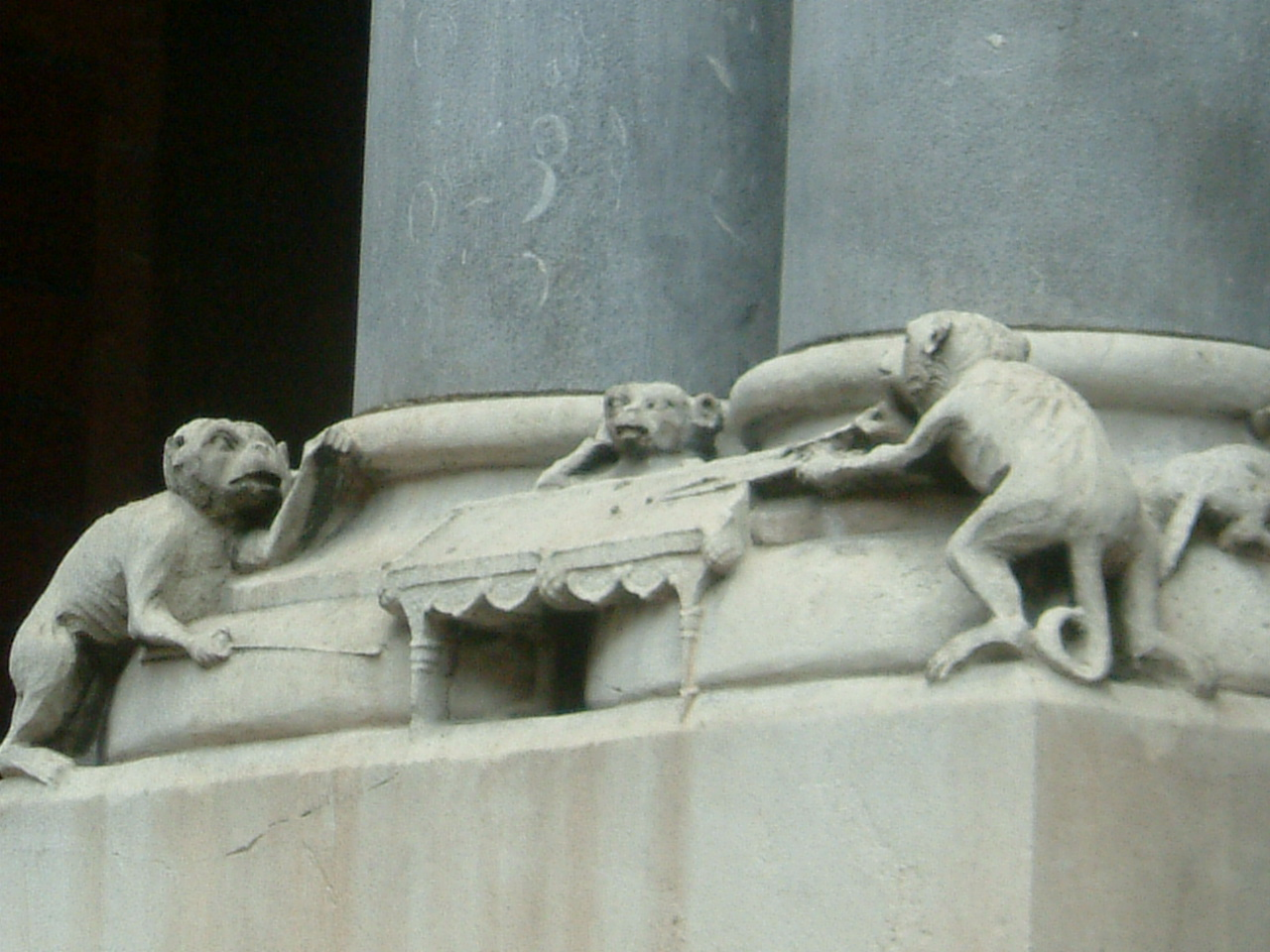
Decorative carving of monkeys playing billiards

== See also ==
- Daly's Club

== Notes ==
=== Sources ===
- Dublin Tourism, Office. Heritage Trails. Signposted Walking Tours of Dublin (PDF). Dublin Tourism.
