= Powerscourt House, Dublin =

Palladian townhouse in Dublin 2, Ireland

Powerscourt House
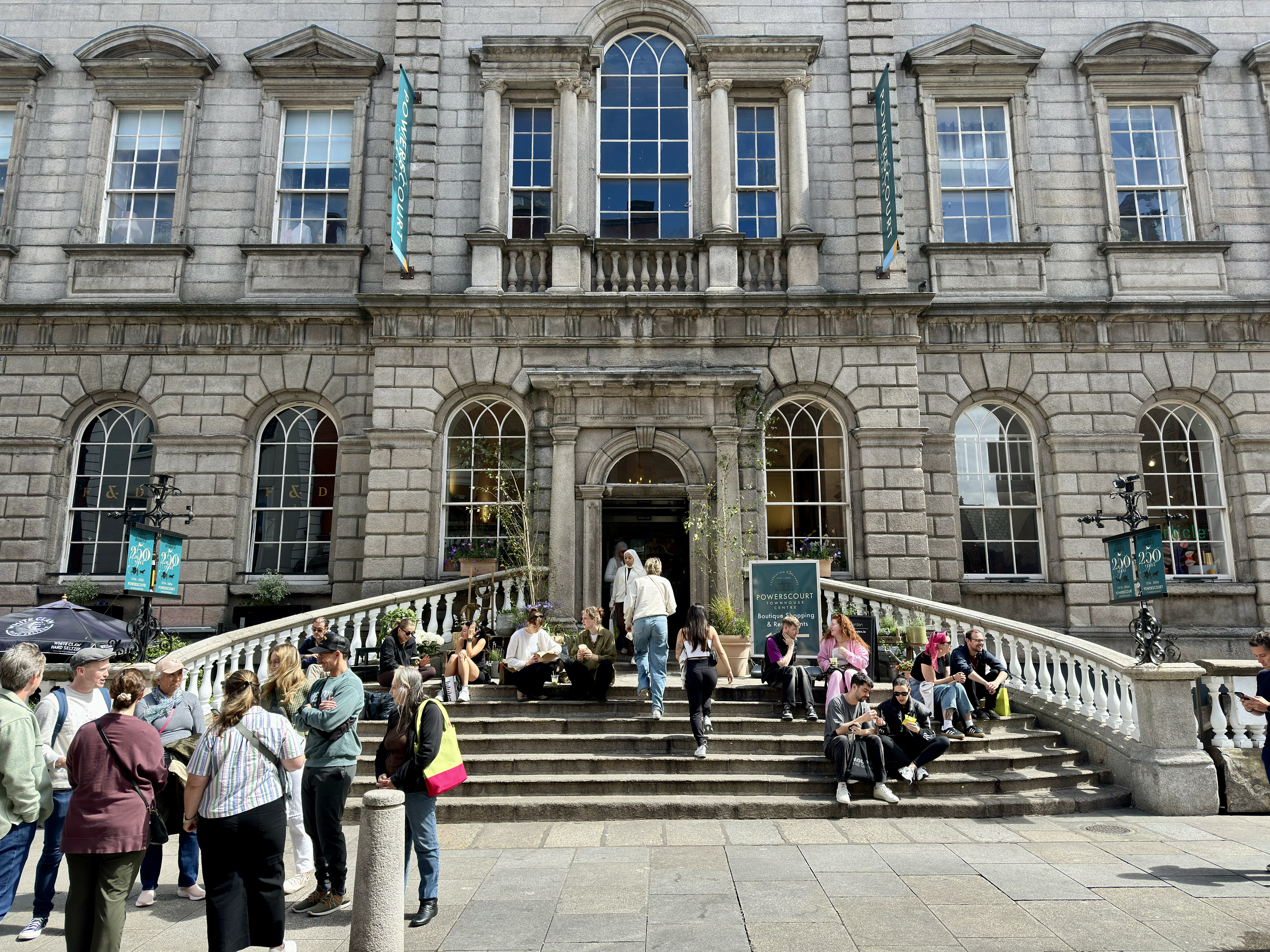
- Main entrance
- Interactive map of the Powerscourt House area
- Alternative names: Powerscourt Townhouse Centre

General information
- Architectural style: Palladian, Georgian
- Location: 59 South William Street, Dublin, Ireland
- Coordinates: 53°20′32.05″N 6°15′42.54″W
- Groundbreaking: 1771
- Completed: 1774; 252 years ago
- Cost: £10,000 (1771-74)
- Owner: Clarendon Properties Group

Technical details
- Material: granite (front facade), brick (rear and sides)

Design and construction
- Architect: Robert Mack
- Developer: Richard Wingfield, 3rd Viscount Powerscourt

Renovating team
- Architect: Francis Johnston (1807-11)

Powerscourt House is the former Dublin townhouse of Viscount Powerscourt and now the Powerscourt Townhouse Centre, located on South William Street, Dublin.

== History ==
The townhouse was constructed between 1771 and 1774 on a broad vacant site for Richard Wingfield, 3rd Viscount Powerscourt overlooking a garden in front with granite stone from his own Powerscourt Estate in County Wicklow. Wingfield was a member of the Irish House of Lords and the house enabled him and his family to stay there when they were visiting from their rural estate of the same name in Enniskerry. The house was constructed adjacent to the newly built gallery developed by the Society of Artists in Ireland which would later go on to become City Assembly House.

The house was designed by the architect and stonemason Robert Mack and has been characterised as "last-gasp Palladianism on a grand scale on a narrow street", more reminiscent of a country house than a city townhouse.

Various notable craftsmen were noted as having worked on the building including Ignatius McDonagh's woodcarving on the interior mahogany staircase balustrade and furniture.

James McCullagh completed stuccowork throughout the house including on the stairhall and study while Michael Stapleton completed stuccowork on the principal reception rooms. In both cases, this is some of the first stuccowork in the city in the more delicate neo classical style of Robert and James Adam and marked the transition in taste away from the more elaborate Rococo style which had dominated many of the city townhouses of the prior period from around 1740 onwards.

=== Stamp Office ===
Within a couple of years of the abolition of the Parliament of Ireland, the viscount sold this Dublin residence since he received his seat now at the House of Lords in London.

The government then bought the property and the court at the rear of the building was created with the addition of three brown-brick office buildings from 1807 to 1811 to the design of Francis Johnston at a cost of £15,000. Between May 1811 and 1835 the Stamp Office, where impressed stamp duty newspaper stamps, a form of revenue stamp were applied to newspapers, journals and periodicals, was located in Powerscourt House having moved from Eustace Street with an original office having been designated for Foster Place.

=== Shopping centre ===
Powerscourt House was purchased and redeveloped as a shopping centre between 1978 and 1981 by Robin Power. The journalist Frank McDonald described the conversion of the building as "imaginative" and "the city's smartest shopping centre".

== Gallery ==
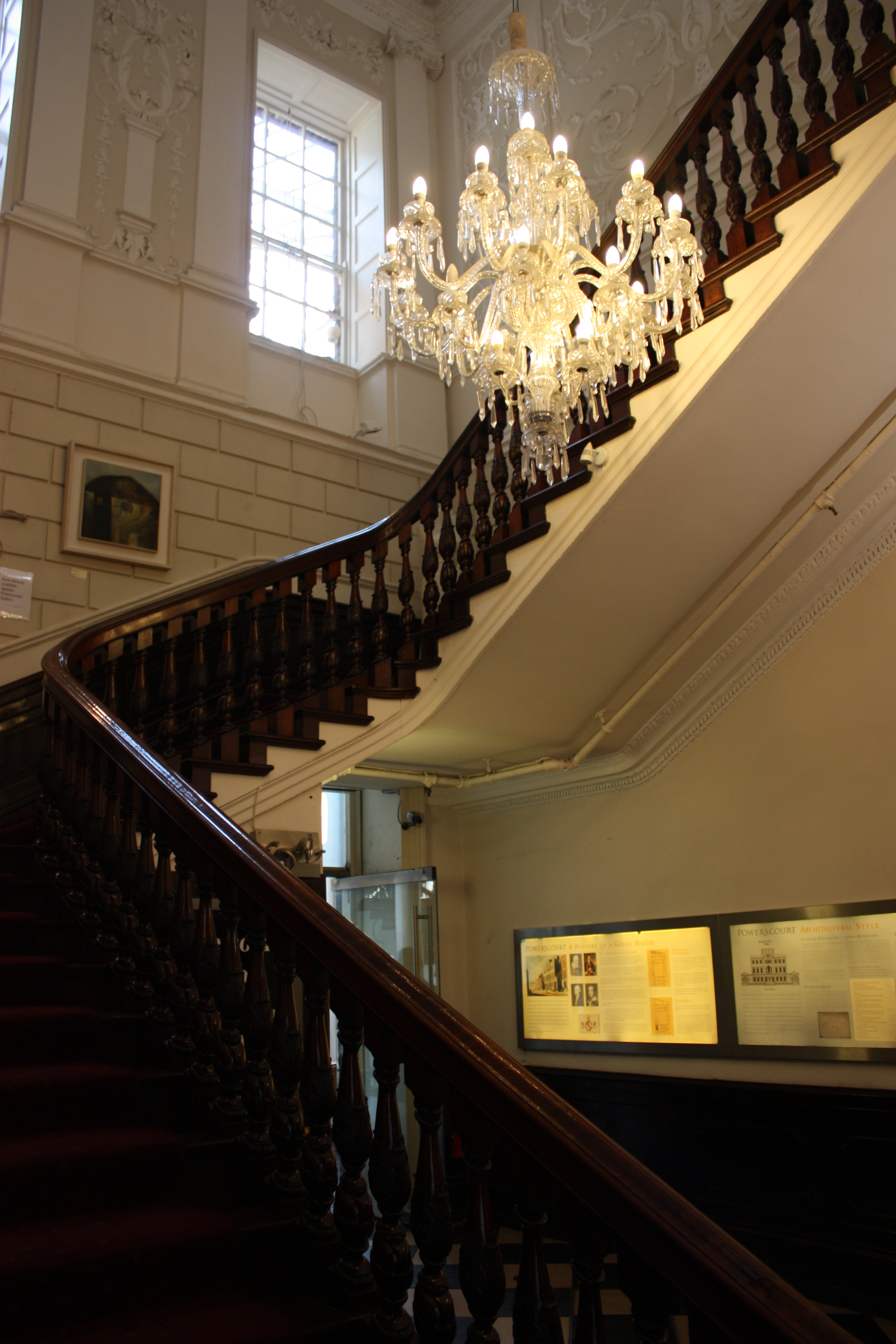
Main staircase

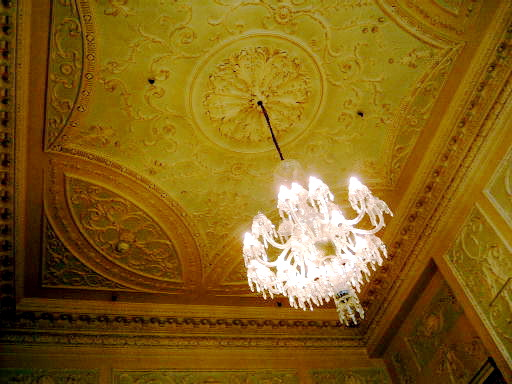
Ceiling and stuccowork on staircase

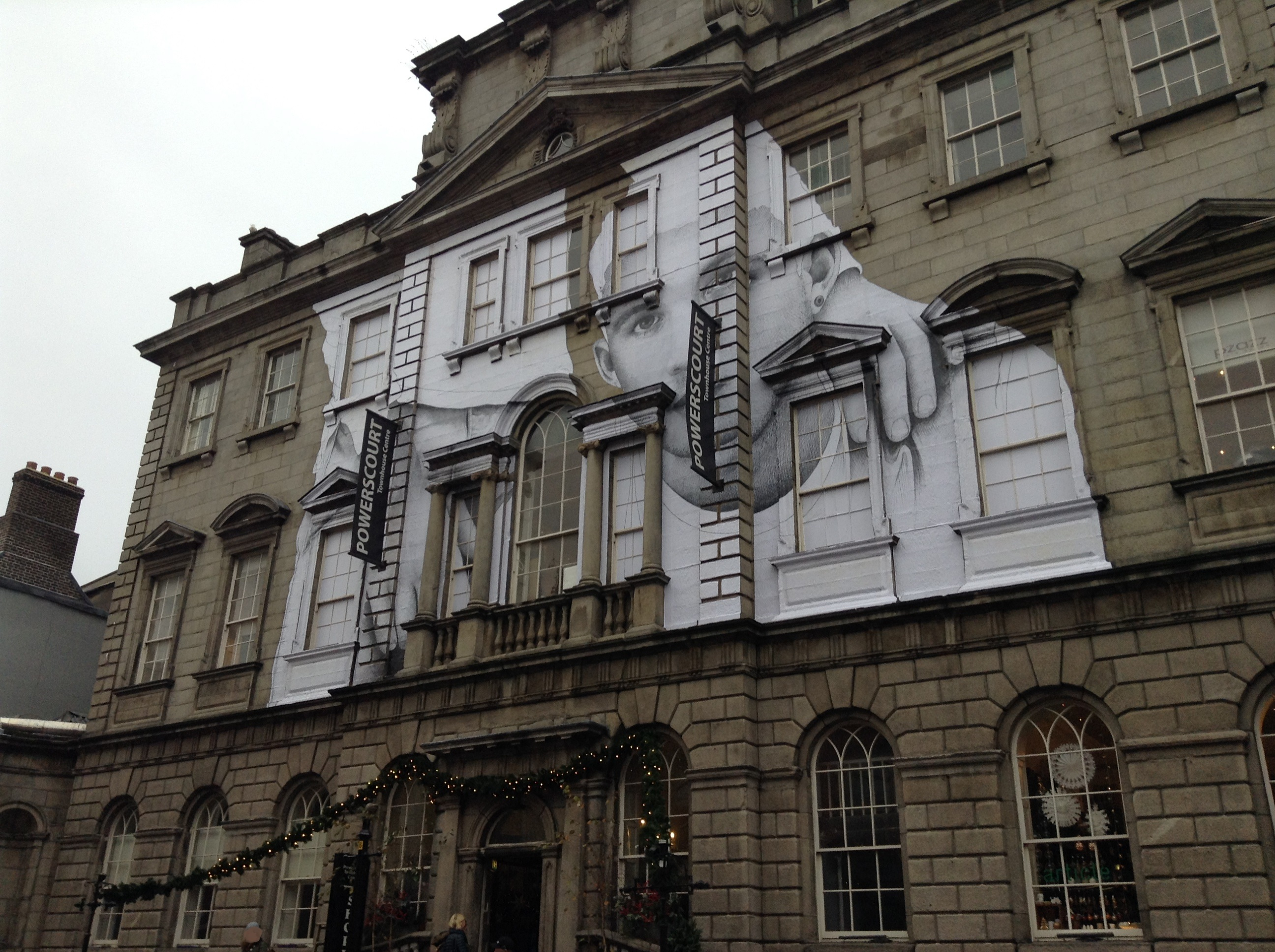
Front of the building with a projected light show in 2014

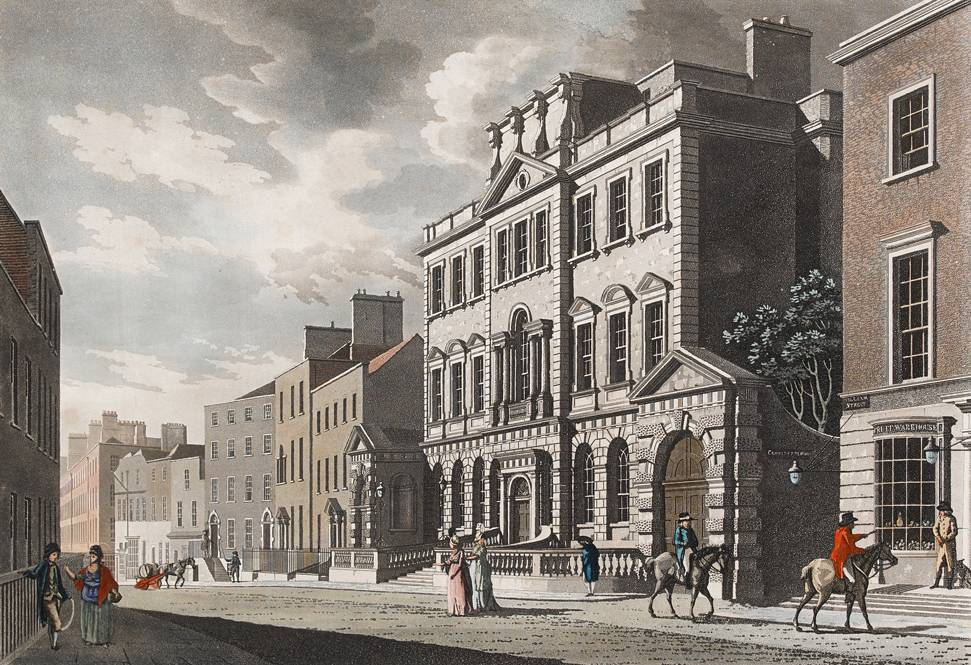
Illustration of the building by James Malton in 1792

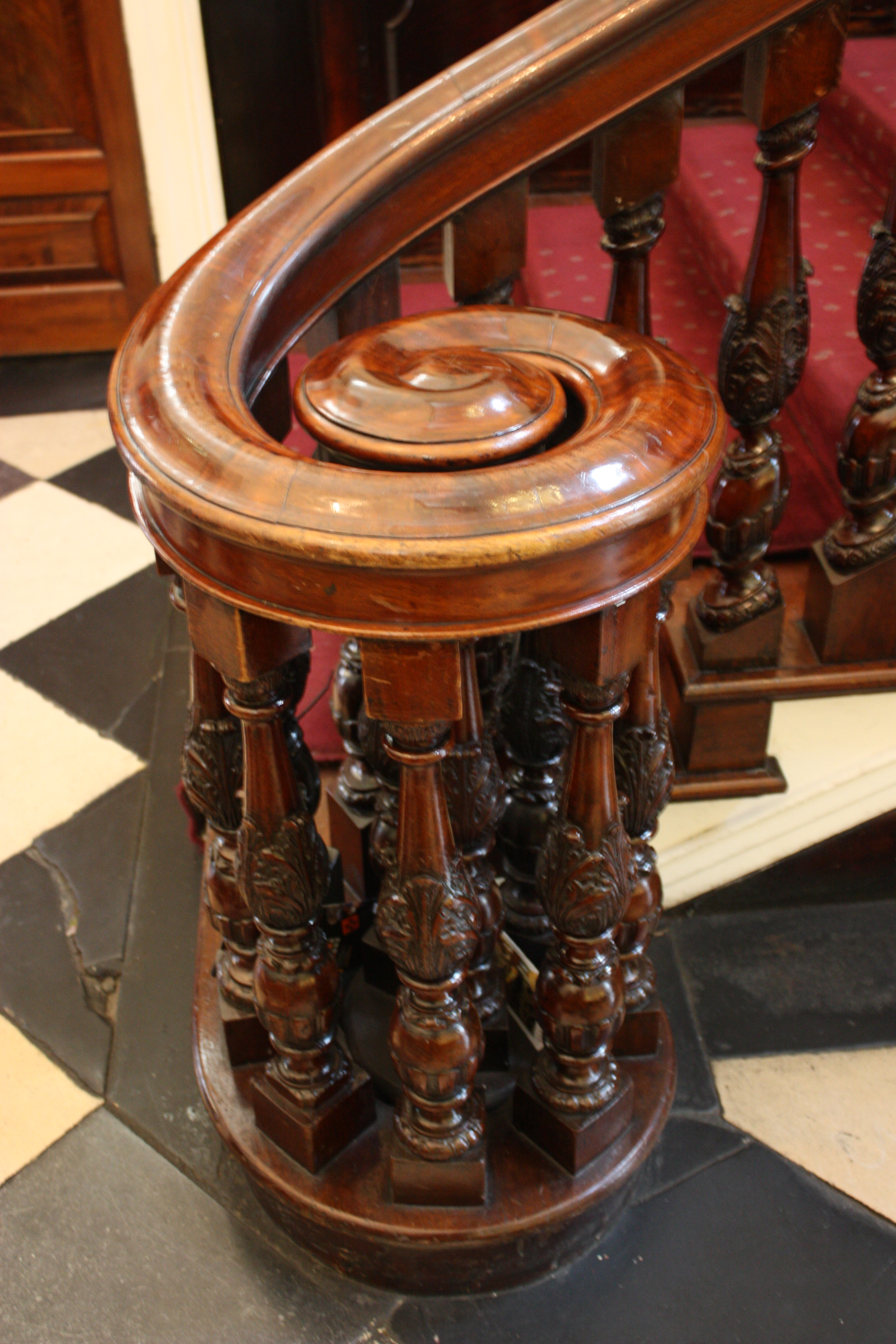
Detail of internal stairs

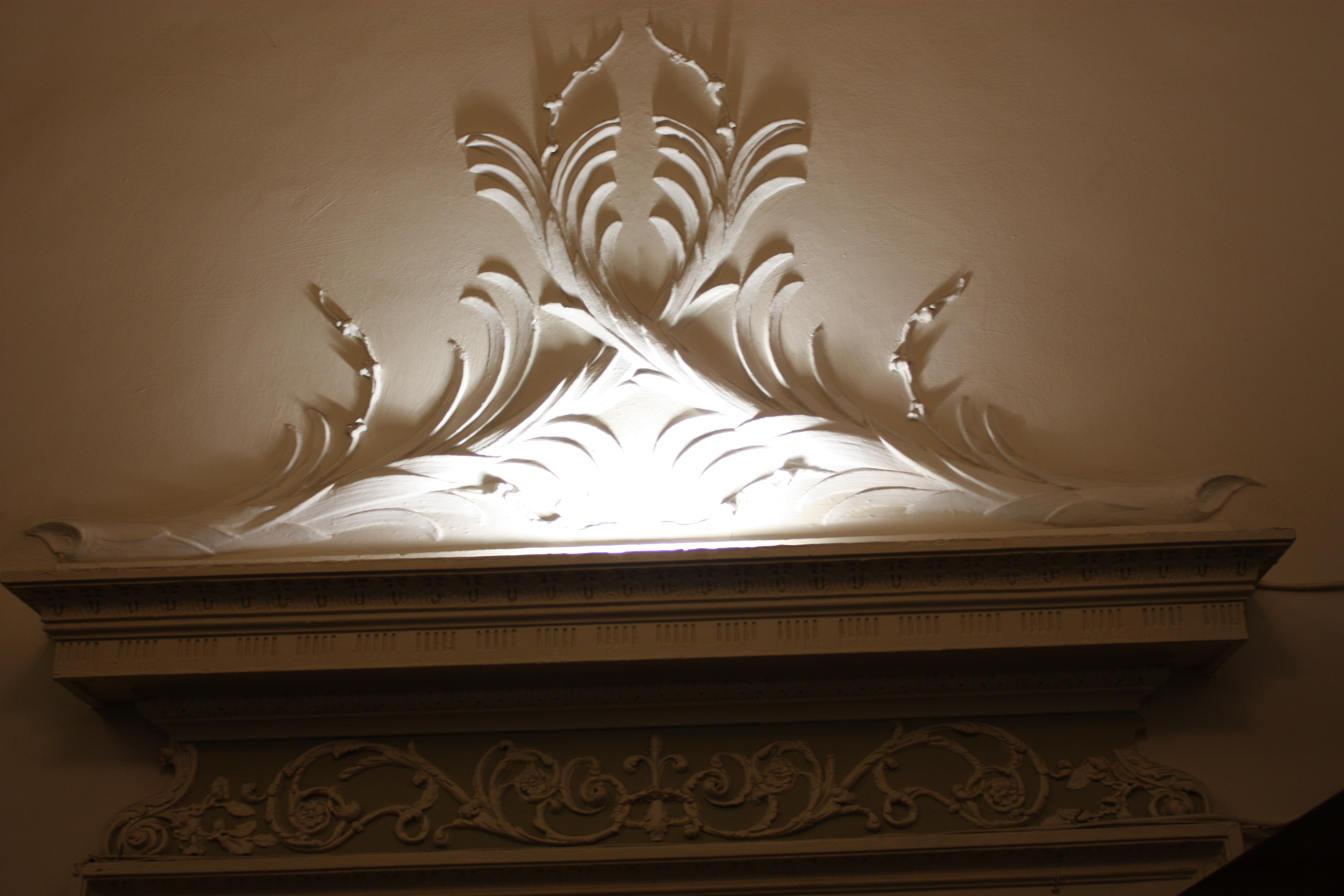
Stuccowork and overdoor

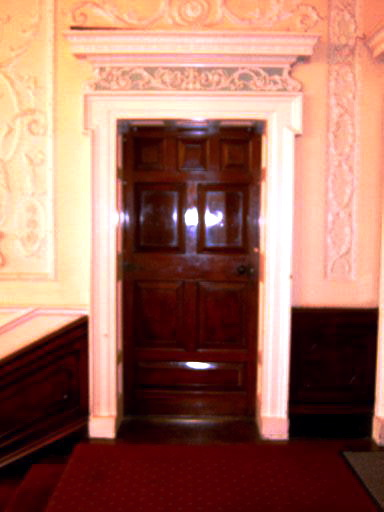
Stairhall door

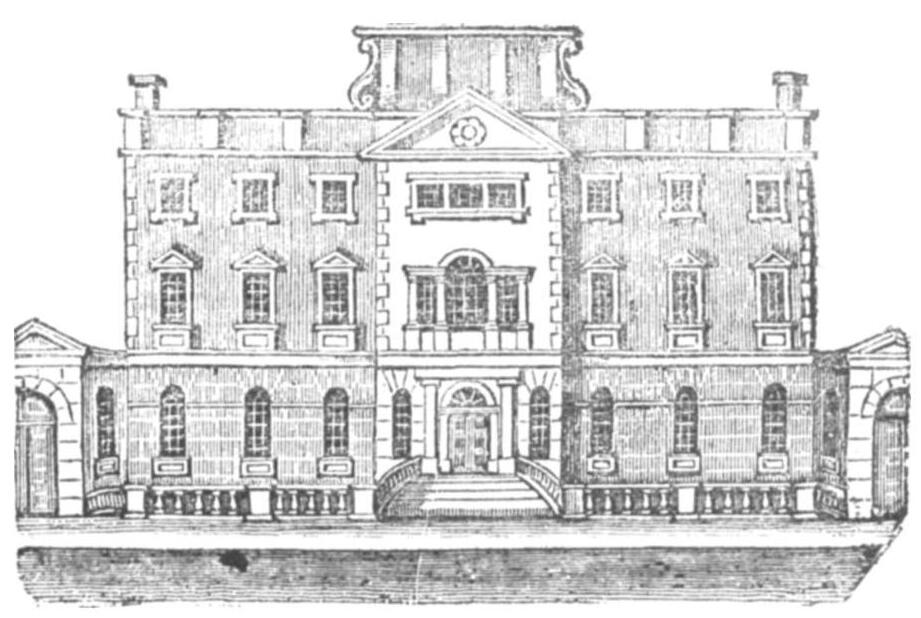
Illustration in the Dublin Penney Journal (1836)

== See also ==
- City Assembly House
