= David Dickinson (cricketer) =

English cricketer

Personal information
- Full name: David Christopher Dickinson
- Born: 11 December 1929; Blackheath, Kent, England
- Died: 25 August 1997 (aged 67); Brighton, Sussex, England
- Batting: Right-handed
- Bowling: Right-arm medium

Domestic team information
- Years: Team
- 1953: Cambridge University

Career statistics
| Competition | First-class |
|---|---|
| Matches | 13 |
| Runs scored | 111 |
| Batting average | 10.09 |
| 100s/50s | –/– |
| Top score | 36* |
| Balls bowled | 1,661 |
| Wickets | 24 |
| Bowling average | 27.20 |
| 5 wickets in innings | – |
| 10 wickets in match | – |
| Best bowling | 4/22 |
| Catches/stumpings | 3/– |
- Source: Cricinfo, 4 June 2019

David Christopher Dickinson (11 December 1929 – 25 August 1997) was an English first-class cricketer.

Dickinson was born at Blackheath in December 1929. He was educated at Clifton College, before going up to the University of Cambridge. At Cambridge he made his debut in first-class cricket for Cambridge University against Middlesex in 1953 at Fenner's. He played a further ten first-class matches for Cambridge in 1953, taking 19 wickets with his right-arm medium pace, at an average of 28.00 and with best figures of 4 for 22. He later made two first-class appearances for the Free Foresters against Cambridge University and Oxford University in 1955 and 1957 respectively, taking an additional 5 wickets. He died at Brighton in August 1997.
