= Daly's Club =

Former Gentlemen's club in Dublin, Ireland

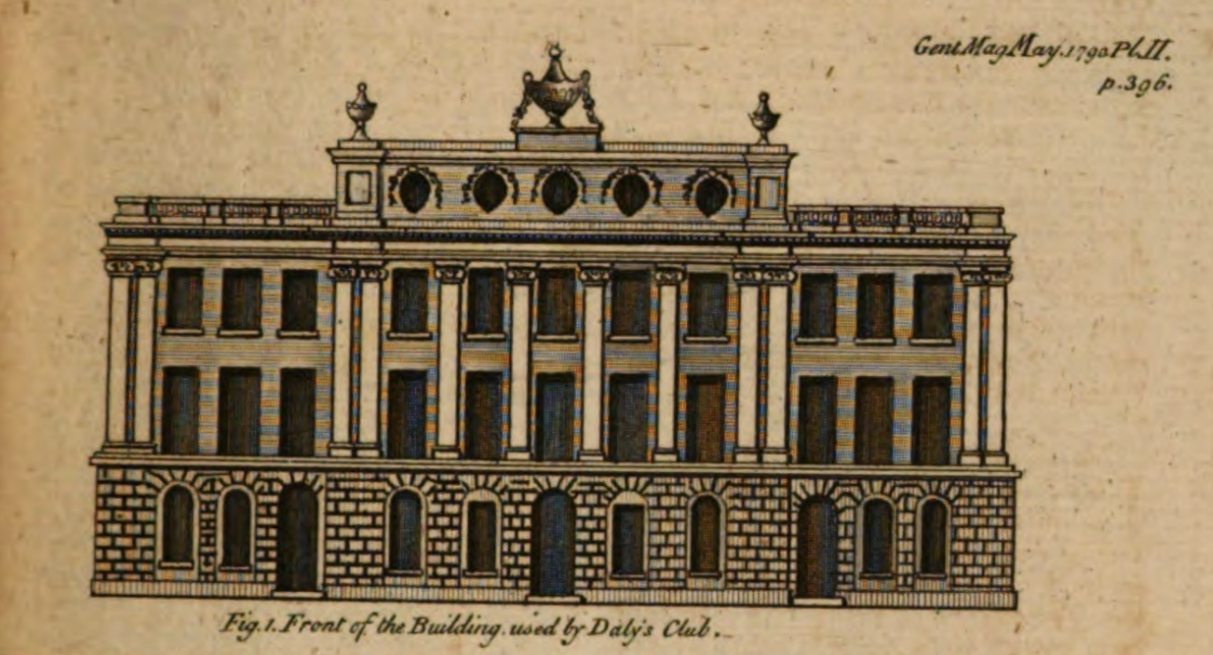
- Daly's Club, 1-5 Dame Street, Dublin 2 from an illustration in 1790
- Formation: 1750
- Founder: Various members
- Founded at: Daly's Coffee House
- Type: Social club
- Legal status: defunct
- Headquarters: Daly's Club House
- Location(s): 1-5 Dame Street and 1-4 Foster Place
- Coordinates: 53.344490°N 6.261450°W

Daly's Club House

General information
- Type: Club house
- Architectural style: Neoclassical; Georgian
- Location: Ireland
- Construction started: 1789
- Estimated completion: 1790
- Renovated: 2 additional floors added to replace top floor in the early 1900s
- Demolished: Western wing (1878), Eastern wing (1866)

Technical details
- Material: granite
- Floor count: 4 over basement

Design and construction
- Architects: Francis Johnston and Richard Johnston
- Other designers: Wide Streets Commissioners

Daly's Club, with premises known as Daly's Club House, was a gentlemen's club in Dublin, Ireland, a centre of social and political life between its origins in around 1750 and its end in 1823.

== History ==
Daly's had its origins in a Chocolate house, established in about 1750 at 1–3 Dame Street, Dublin, later described as "the only society, in the nature of club, then existing in the Irish metropolis". The establishment was frequented by many members of the Parliament of Ireland. In the 1760s, a group of gentlemen who met there constituted themselves as a club, which was said to be named after Henry Grattan's friend Denis Daly (1748–1791). In some ways this came to resemble White's in St James's Street, London, both in importance and exclusivity.

In 1787, the blackballing of William Burton Conyngham for political motives led to an exodus of members from Daly's, who in the shape of the Kildare Street Club formed a new club which soon rivalled Daly's as a fashionable haunt.

=== New Clubhouse ===
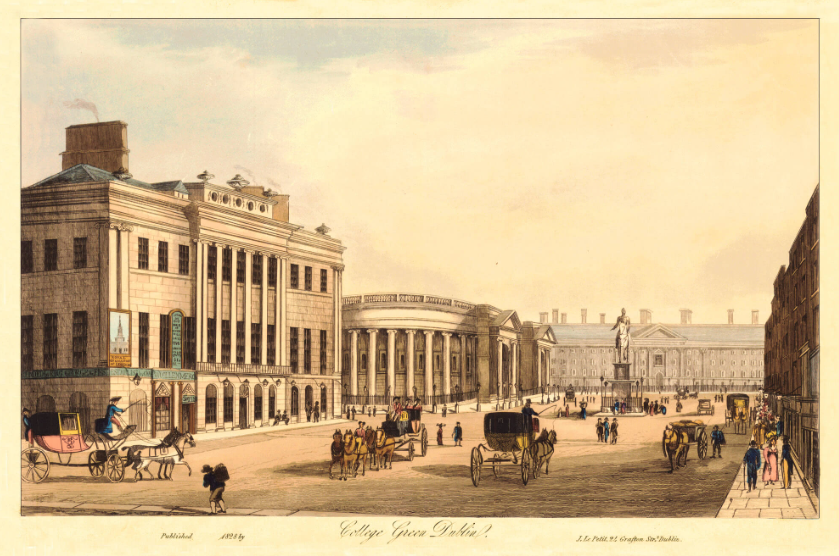
A view of the building around 1818 by Samuel Frederick Brocas

Foster Place and Daly's Club circa 1860

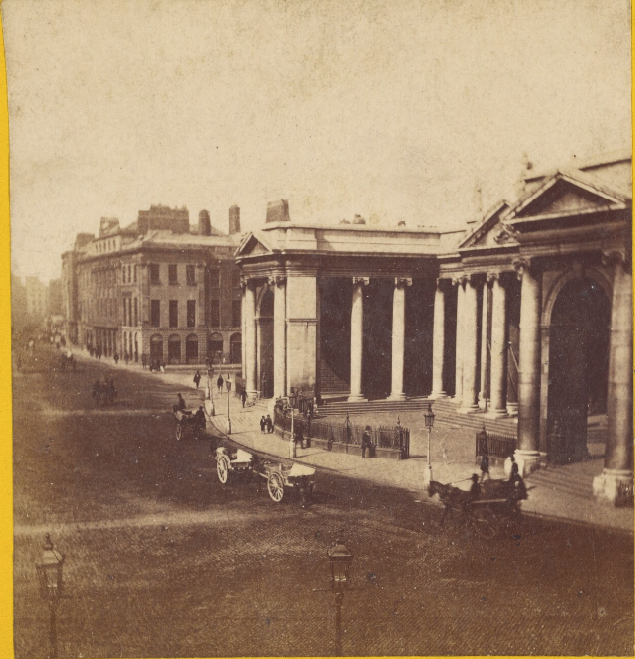
Daly's Club and the Bank of Ireland, College Green circa 1860

In 1790 a number of members of Daly's who were also members of the Irish Parliament paid for a new clubhouse at number 3, College Green, close to the Irish Houses of Parliament. The new premises, designed by Richard Johnston, stretched from Anglesea Street to Foster Place and were opened with a grand dinner on 16 February 1791. With marble chimneypieces, white and gold chairs and sofas covered with aurora silk, the new clubhouse was superbly furnished.

Patrick Wyse Jackson, curator of the Geological Museum in Trinity College, assessed the building in 1993: "The building is constructed of Golden Hill granite: the ground floor is rusticated while the upper storeys are faced in flat ashlar blocks. The attic storey is a more recent addition. The façade bears unusual paired Ionic pilasters. The two wings have long been replaced".

Daly's Club reached the height of its notability after its arrival at College Green. It was one of the venues for meetings of the Irish Hell Fire Club, which met variously at Montpelier Lodge on Montpelier Hill, at the Eagle Tavern on Cork Hill near Dublin Castle, or at Daly's on College Green.

In 1794, The European Magazine and London Review declared:

The God of Cards and Dice has a Temple, called Daly's, dedicated to his honour in Dublin, much more magnificent than any Temple to be found in that city dedicated to the God of the Universe.

However, after the Union with Great Britain of 1800 put an end to the Irish Parliament by creating the United Kingdom of Great Britain and Ireland, the Club fell into a decline and was eclipsed by the Kildare Street Club.

Daly was followed as manager of the Club by Peter Depoe, who continued in office until 1823, when the Club was closed. By 1841, the Club was described in the Edinburgh magazine as "the once-celebrated, and still well-remembered, "Daly's Club" ".

After the Club's demise, the novels of Charles Lever, such as Charles O'Malley: The Irish Dragoon and The Knight of Gwynne: a Tale of the Time of the Union, gave it a reputation for melodramatic romance.

In Charles O'Malley, Lever gives an impression of the impact of the Club's closure:

To describe the consternation the intelligence caused on every side is impossible; nothing in history equals it – except, perhaps, the entrance of the French army into Moscow, deserted and forsaken by its former inhabitants.

In 1866, Charles Dickens alluded to the fate of the Club in his All the Year Round:

Even now, next to the old Parliament House stands a stately building, cut up into half-a-dozen houses of business. This was once "Daly's Club-house," where all the noblemen and gentlemen of both Houses would adjourn to dine and drink; where were seen Mr. Grattan, and Mr. Flood with "his broken beak," and Mr. Curran, and those brilliant but guerilla debaters, whose encounters both of wit and logic make our modern parliamentary contests sound tame and languid.

=== Later replacements ===
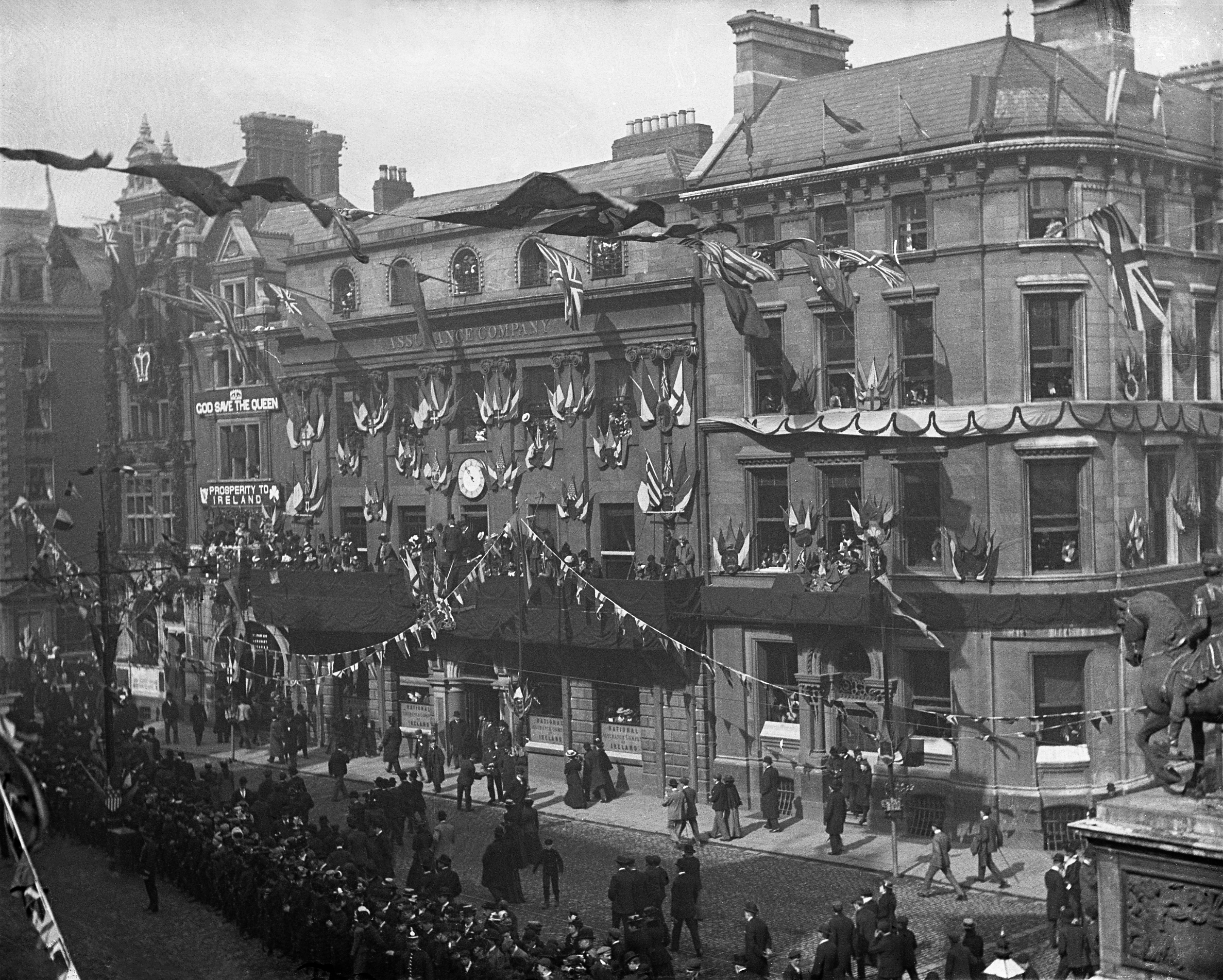
The building after the demolition of both wings during Queen Victoria's visit to Ireland in 1900. Lettering of the National Assurance Company of Ireland can be seen on the front. The additional two floors had yet to be added.

The buildings were later occupied by various businesses mostly concerned with stock and insurance broking.

The Eastern wing of the clubhouse at 1 College Green was replaced in 1867 with the offices of the Liverpool and London Globe Insurance Company to a design by Thomas Newenham Deane.

Later the Western wing at 5 College Green was replaced around 1878-80 also to a design by Deane for the Royal Exchange Assurance Corporation. It remained in the building until the company merged with the Guardian Assurance Company in 1968 and a new dedicated premises at St Stephen's Green was constructed by G&T Crampton.

The building at 3-4 Foster Place was sold to the Hibernian United Services Club around 1813 and then subsequently sold on to the Royal Bank of Ireland around 1846. The successor bank, AIB only vacated the premises in 2001 when the building was sold to Trinity College Dublin.

The remains of the main building at 2-4 College Green were occupied by the National Assurance Company of Ireland when it was acquired by Yorkshire Insurance Company in 1907. It was the venue in which a meeting was held on the 1st June 1885 establishing the Insurance Institute of Ireland.

As of 2023 the remains of the original building at 2-4 College Green are occupied by a coffee shop and offices.

== Notable members ==
- John Philpot Curran
- Henry Flood
- Charles Kendal Bushe
- William Conyngham Plunket, 1st Baron Plunket
- Henry Grattan
- Sir Hercules Langrishe, 1st Baronet
- George Ponsonby

== See also ==
- Kildare Street Club

== Notes ==
=== Sources ===
- Wyse Jackson, Patrick (1993). The Building Stones of Dublin: A Walking Guide. Donnybrook, Dublin: Town House and Country House. ISBN 0-946172-32-3.

== Bibliography ==
- R. E. Brooke, Daly's Club and Kildare Street Club (Dublin: 1930)
