= Lord Francis Powerscourt =

Fictional character

Lord Francis Powerscourt is a fictional Victorian-Edwardian detective who has appeared in fifteen novels by the author David Dickinson.

== Background ==
Powerscourt is descended from Irish aristocracy, his ancestral home is Powerscourt House in County Wicklow, Ireland. It is not clear whether he is properly Lord Powerscourt, i.e. a peer in his own right, or Lord Francis Powerscourt, i.e. the younger son of a high-ranking peer.

Powerscourt's parents both died of Influenza while he was a child. Powerscourt was educated at Eton followed by Cambridge University. His early (and so far largely undocumented) career was with army intelligence in India and Afghanistan where he served with distinction. It is during these early years that Powerscourt discovers his talent for detection.

His first wife and son drowned when their ship sunk in the Irish Sea. Powerscourt later remarried to Lady Lucy Hamilton and fathered two children, Olivia and Thomas, as well as becoming step father to Robert, Lady Hamilton's son from her first marriage. Twins Christopher and Elizabeth (known by her second name of Juliet) were also born and first appeared in "Death called to the Bar".

Powerscourt is great friends with Lord Johnny Fitzgerald and Home Secretary and Prime Minister Lord Rosebery. Fitzgerald, who Powerscourt grew up with in Ireland, acts as an aide and confidant to Powerscourt and assists in his investigations. Both Powerscourt and Fitzgerald have saved each other's lives during their army service together.

== Books ==
All 15 books in the Lord Francis Powerscourt series have been published by Constable & Robinson.

=== Goodnight Sweet Prince (2002) ===
1892 - Investigation into the blackmailing and murder of Prince Eddy, the son of the Prince of Wales.

=== Death and the Jubilee (2002) ===
1897 - Investigation of a headless corpse found floating in the Thames and the threat to Queen Victoria's Diamond Jubilee.

=== Death of an Old Master (2004) ===
1899 - Investigation into the murder of a leading London art critic.

=== Death of a Chancellor (2005) ===
1901 - Investigation into the murder of the Chancellor of Compton Cathedral.

=== Death Called to the Bar (2006) ===
1902 - Investigation into the murder of the leading barrister Alexander Dauntsey.

=== Death on the Nevskii Prospekt (2006) ===
1904 - Investigation into the murder of a British diplomat in St Petersburg.

=== Death on the Holy Mountain (2009) ===
1905 - Investigation in Ireland of a series of art thefts from stately houses.

=== Death of a Pilgrim (2010) ===
1905 - Investigation into a pilgrim killed in Le Puy-en-Velay, France. More deaths occur to pilgrims traveling to Santiago de Compostela, Spain.

=== Death of a Wine Merchant (2010) ===
Investigation into the murder of Randolph Colville, chairman of Colville Wines, at his son's wedding. His brother Cosmo is found standing next to the body, holding a gun, but refuses to say a word.

=== Death in a Scarlet Coat (2011) ===
Investigation into the death of the Earl of Candlesby found dead on his horse with a corner of his scarlet coat visible in the morning mist.

=== Death at the Jesus Hospital (publication 2012) ===
Investigation into three men found with their throats cut. All are connected to the Silkworkers, an ancient City of London livery company.

=== Death of an Elgin Marble (publication 2014) ===
The British Museum in Bloomsbury is home to one of the Caryatids, a statue of a maiden that acted as one of the six columns in a temple which stood on the Acropolis in ancient Athens. Lord Elgin had brought her to London in the nineteenth century, and even though now she was over 2,300 years old, she was still rather beautiful - and desirable. Which is why Lord Francis Powerscourt finds himself summoned by the British Museum to attend a most urgent matter. The Caryatid has been stolen and an inferior copy left in her place. Powerscourt agrees to handle the case discreetly - but then comes the first death: an employee of the British Museum is pushed under a rush hour train before he and the police can question him. What had he known about the statue's disappearance? And who would want such a priceless object? Powerscourt and his friend Johnny Fitzgerald undertake a mission that takes them deep into the heart of London's Greek community and the upper echelons of English society to uncover the bizarre truth of the vanishing lady...

=== Death Comes to the Ballets Russes (2015) ===
London, 1912, and the famed Ballet Russes have come to London to perform. Anticipation is high, for Diaghilev's troupe is renowned throughout Europe. At the end of their famed performance of Thamar at the Royal Opera House, the Georgian queen stabs her prince to death and throws him into the river. But life mirrors art when the prince is found truly dead, stabbed through the heart in the orchestra pit below stage. But the corpse is not the dancer in the programme. It is his understudy. Powerscourt is summoned to investigate. But who was the intended victim ? the understudy, or the star of the Ballets Russes? And the Ballets Russes are not the only Russian visitors in London this season. Lenin, Europe's most dangerous revolutionary, has sent some bank robbery money to be changed into pounds. There are stolen jewels from St Petersburg to be sold. And there are other darker forces abroad too and Powerscourt has to look death in the face before he can solve the mystery of Death at the Ballets Russes.

=== Death Comes to Lynchester Close (2016) ===
Lord Francis Powerscourt is visited at home in London by the Bishop of Lynchester who wants his advice about the suspect for the death of an aged parishioner. Powerscourt advises that discretion rather than accusation is the best way forward, but this is just the start of his association with the diocese of Lynchester. The death of the parishioner has left available a property in the cathedral close which traditionally the church rents out to a suitable tenant. Four worthy candidates are nominated...and then one of them, the retail king of the south of England, is found dead in the house, poisoned by strychnine. So once again Powerscourt is summoned by the bishop as this time there is no doubt of foul play. But there are many suspects from which to choose - there are the other candidates who want to live in that very desirable property...or could it be more complex than that? Very soon Powerscourt uncovers a trail of greed, deception and death which goes straight to the heart of the cathedral itself.

=== Death at Melrose Hall (2017) ===
A night of dancing that ends with the mysterious disappearance of a stable-boy - and Lord Francis Powerscourt is summoned to investigate.

Spring 1914, and Jack Harper, current owner of Melrose Hall, has thrown a party for his eldest, Andrew, who is turning twenty-one. But the following morning there is no sign of Richard O'Connor. More than just a stable-boy, Richard acts as the legs of the paralyzed Jack Harper, pushing him around the estate in his wheelchair and sharing with him an affinity with the family's stable of thoroughbreds.

The police aren't interested in the disappearance of a servant so Powerscourt is summoned. And then a body is discovered in the tackroom of one of the farms on the estate. Richard O'Connor has been shot through the head - but why would anyone want to shoot him? And what of Richard's unique ability - he can tell which horse is going to win the race. Did that lead to his death? Or was it the arrival of gangs at the local races, keen to enlist Richard into their crime syndicates?
