= Kildare Street =

Street in Dublin

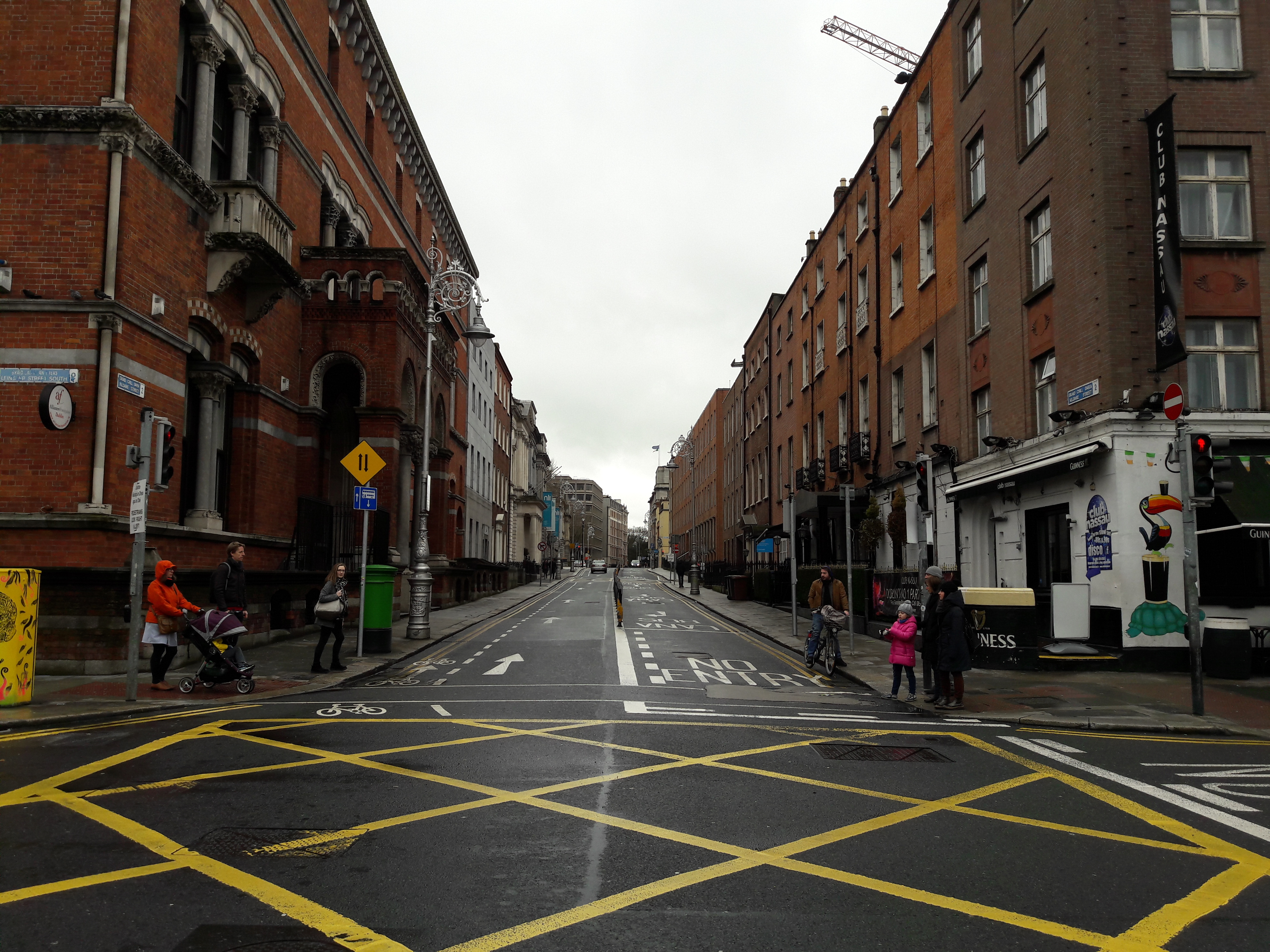
- North end near Trinity College

- Location within Central Dublin
- Native name: Sráid Chill Dara (Irish)
- Former name: Coote Street
- Namesake: James FitzGerald, 1st Duke of Leinster and 20th Earl of Kildare
- Length: 400 m (1,300 ft)
- Width: 15 m (49 ft)
- Location: Dublin, Ireland
- Postal code: D02
- Coordinates: 53°20′31″N 06°15′17″W
- north end: Nassau Street, Leinster Street South
- south end: St. Stephen's Green North

Other
- Known for: Leinster House, National Library of Ireland, National Museum of Ireland – Archaeology, Royal College of Physicians of Ireland, Alliance française

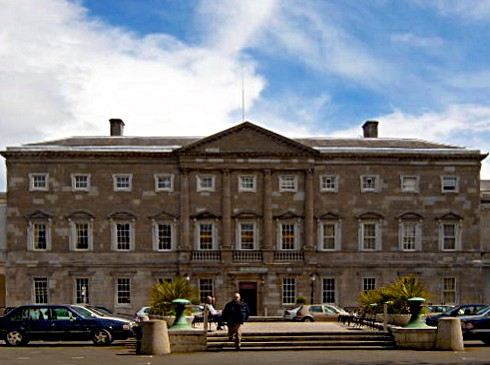
Leinster House The former palace of the Duke of Leinster. Since 1922, it has been the seat of both houses of the Irish parliament.

Kildare Street (Irish: Sráid Chill Dara) is a street in Dublin, Ireland.

== Location ==
Kildare Street is close to the principal shopping area of Grafton Street and Dawson Street, to which it is joined by Molesworth Street. Trinity College lies at the north end of the street while St Stephen's Green is at the southern end, with the well-known Shelbourne Hotel on the eastern corner.

== History ==
Kildare Street is named after James FitzGerald, 1st Duke of Leinster and 20th Earl of Kildare, who built Leinster House. The street was previously known as Coote Street up to 1753, earlier as Coote Lane, with the area was historically known as Molesworth fields or "lands of Tib and Tom".

In 1972, in advance of Ireland joining the then European Economic Community the then Chief Justice, and later President of Ireland, Cearbhall Ó Dálaigh wrote to the Minister for Foreign Affairs, Patrick Hillery, also later President of Ireland, seeking for the street to be renamed Rue de l'Europe.

== Architecture ==
On the corner with Leinster Street is the former Kildare Street Club, which before the partition of Ireland was at the heart of the Anglo-Irish Protestant Ascendancy. The building now houses the Dublin offices of Alliance française.

Some Irish government departments have their offices on this street but Leinster House, the current seat of the Oireachtas (Irish parliament), built by Richard Cassels in 1745 is Kildare Street's most important building. The National Library of Ireland and the Archaeology branch of the National Museum of Ireland are located on either side of the Leinster House and were built in 1885.

The 1935 Department of Industry and Commerce government buildings are a rare and largely unaltered Art Deco public building. The building features relief sculptures by Gabriel Hayes.

In 1969, the Irish government announced it would be building the largest office block built in Dublin to that date on a plot of land on Kildare Place behind the Shelbourne Hotel. The plan was to build an 8-storey block providing the Department of Agriculture with 4 acres of office space. Named Agriculture House, it was designed by Stephenson Gibney and Associates. It is constructed using Armagh limestone aggregate which helped the building sit in its surroundings.

== See also ==
- List of streets and squares in Dublin
