= Francis Johnston (architect) =

Irish architect (1760–1829)

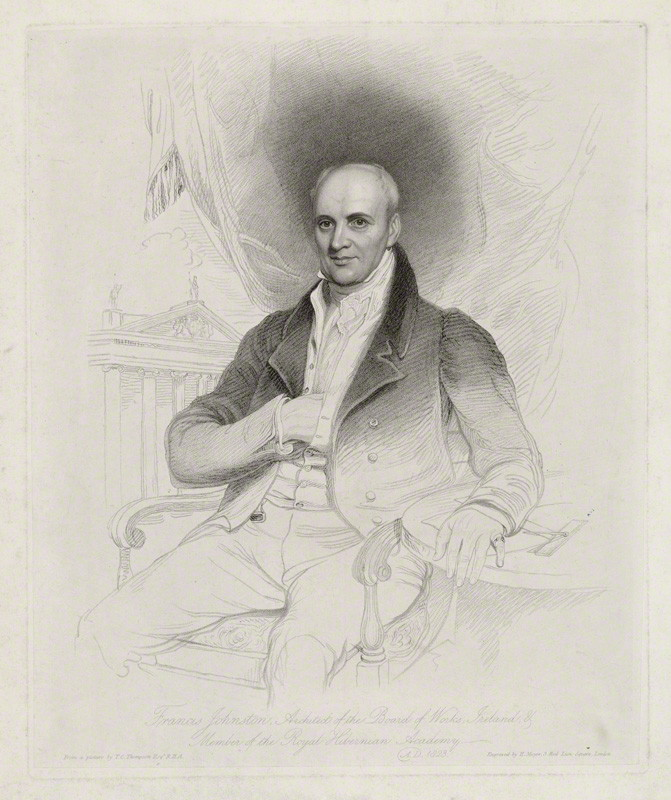
- Born: 14 January 1760; Armagh, Ireland
- Died: 14 March 1829 (aged 69); 64 Eccles Street, Dublin, Ireland
- Resting place: St. George's Church, Dublin, Ireland
- Occupation: Architect
- Parent: William Johnston
- Relatives: Richard Johnston (brother); Andrew Johnston (half brother)
- Buildings: GPO; Nelson's Pillar; St. George's Church, Dublin; Ballynegall House; Daly's Club; Parliament House (notable additions)

Francis Johnston (1760 – 14 March 1829) was an Anglo-Irish architect, best known for building the General Post Office (GPO) on O'Connell Street, Dublin.

== Life ==
Johnston was born in Armagh, Ireland, the son of architect William Johnston and younger brother of architect Richard Johnston and younger half-brother, surgeon Andrew Johnston. Francis later also studied architecture. He practised in Armagh, and then lived in Drogheda from 1786 before moving to Dublin about 1793. In 1805, he was appointed to the Board of Works as an architect. In 1824 he was made president of the Royal Hibernian Academy of Arts which had been founded the previous year, and he provided headquarters for the academy in Lower Abbey Street at his own expense.

He married Anne Barnes who was the sister of his brother Richard's wife Susanna Barnes and had no issue.

== Works ==
Two early projects were the completion of Rokeby Hall and Ballymakenny Church, Co. Louth, to the designs of Thomas Cooley in whose office he first trained. In 1789 he was commissioned by Richard Robinson, 1st Baron Rokeby, and Archbishop of Armagh to design the Armagh Observatory and in 1790 he designed a new clubhouse for Daly's Club on College Green, close to the Irish Houses of Parliament. Townley Hall, 5 km (3.1 mi) west of Drogheda, built between 1794 and 1798, is considered his finest work. He was responsible for the design of Armagh Courthouse built between 1806 and 1809.

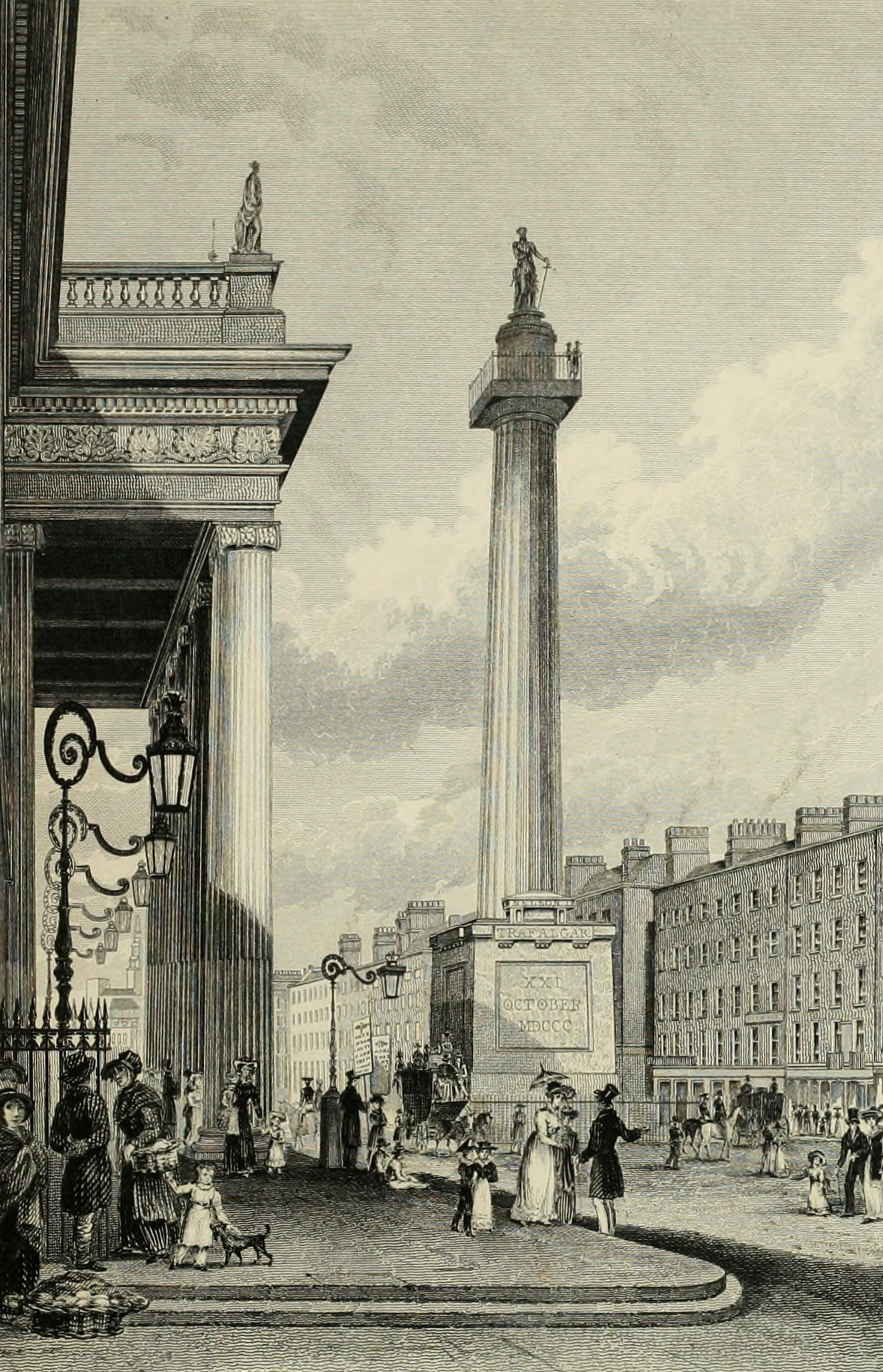
The GPO (left) and Nelson's Pillar in Dublin, c. 1830

At a time of huge rebuilding in Georgian Dublin, Johnston was one of the architects responsible for Sackville Street (now O'Connell Street). The great Pillar and Post Office were designed to harmonise with each other in the street adding grandeur and elegance to the boulevard.

His work is interesting from an architectural point of view, in that it spans both the Neoclassical and Gothic Revival styles. His Chapel Royal in Dublin Castle (1807–1814) is a fine example of an early Gothic revival church in Dublin. On this project (as on many others) he worked closely with the stuccodore George Stapleton, son of the better-known Michael Stapleton. The chapel proved a seminal building for later Gothic Revival architects in Ireland, with the Cork architect Thomas Deane using the detailing from the windows as a model for those of the Aula Maxima of University College Cork, formerly known as Queens College Cork.

Among his other most notable projects were the construction of St. George's Church on the North side of Dublin (1802), overseeing the conversion of Parliament House into the Bank of Ireland (1803–1808) and the construction of the Richmond Tower at the junction of Watling Street and Queen's Bridge in 1812. This gateway had to be moved to the Royal Hospital Kilmainham after the arrival of the railway in 1847 increased traffic congestion. He had placed his personal coat of arms above the arch, concealed by a piece of wood painted to match the stone, his idea being that his arms would be revealed to future generations after the wood became rotten. However, his trick was uncovered when the gateway was taken down for removal. The coat of arms at present on the gateway is that of the Royal Hospital.

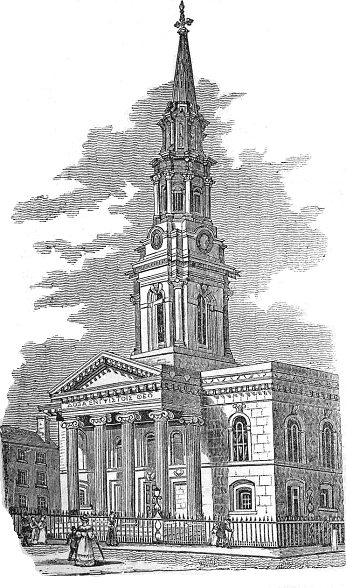
St. George's Church, Hardwicke Place, 1833.

The designs of Galtrim House, Co. Meath (c. 1802) and Ballynegall House, Co. Westmeath, built in 1808, are attributed to Johnston.

In 1813 he began work on Richmond Gaol as a prison to relieve the pressure on Newgate Prison, Dublin, which had been designed by his teacher Thomas Cooley.

He played a major role in designing Nelson's Pillar in Dublin, the construction of which was started in 1808. The original plans for the Pillar were submitted to the organising committee by William Wilkins, a London architect, and accepted by them in 1808. However, for some reason, the committee wrote later that they were incapable of "executing his design precisely as he had given it." Johnston "afforded the necessary assistance with his acknowledged ability, which...he did with the utmost cheerfulness." He made several drawings, one of which met the approval of the committee sufficiently for construction to start. Curiously, the table of expenditure for the Pillar does not include an architect's fee. The Pillar was destroyed by a bomb in 1966.

He was responsible for the design of Charleville Forest Castle in Tullamore, County Offaly, considered one of the finest of its type in the country. As well as the 1807 design of Ballycurry House, Ballycurry Demesne, Ashford, County Wicklow. The design (c. 1810) of Turbotstown House, Coole, County Westmeath has been attributed to Johnston.

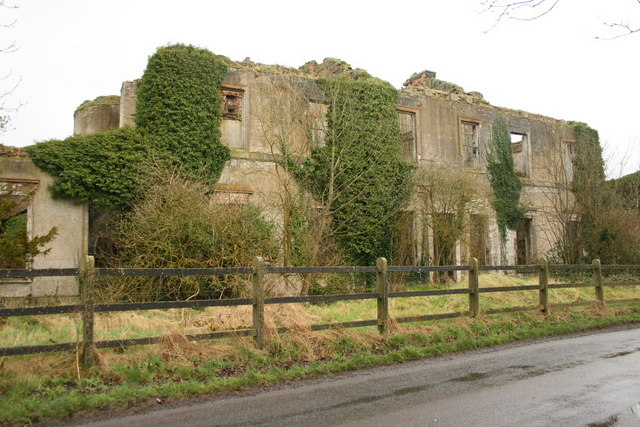
Ruins of Ballynegall House

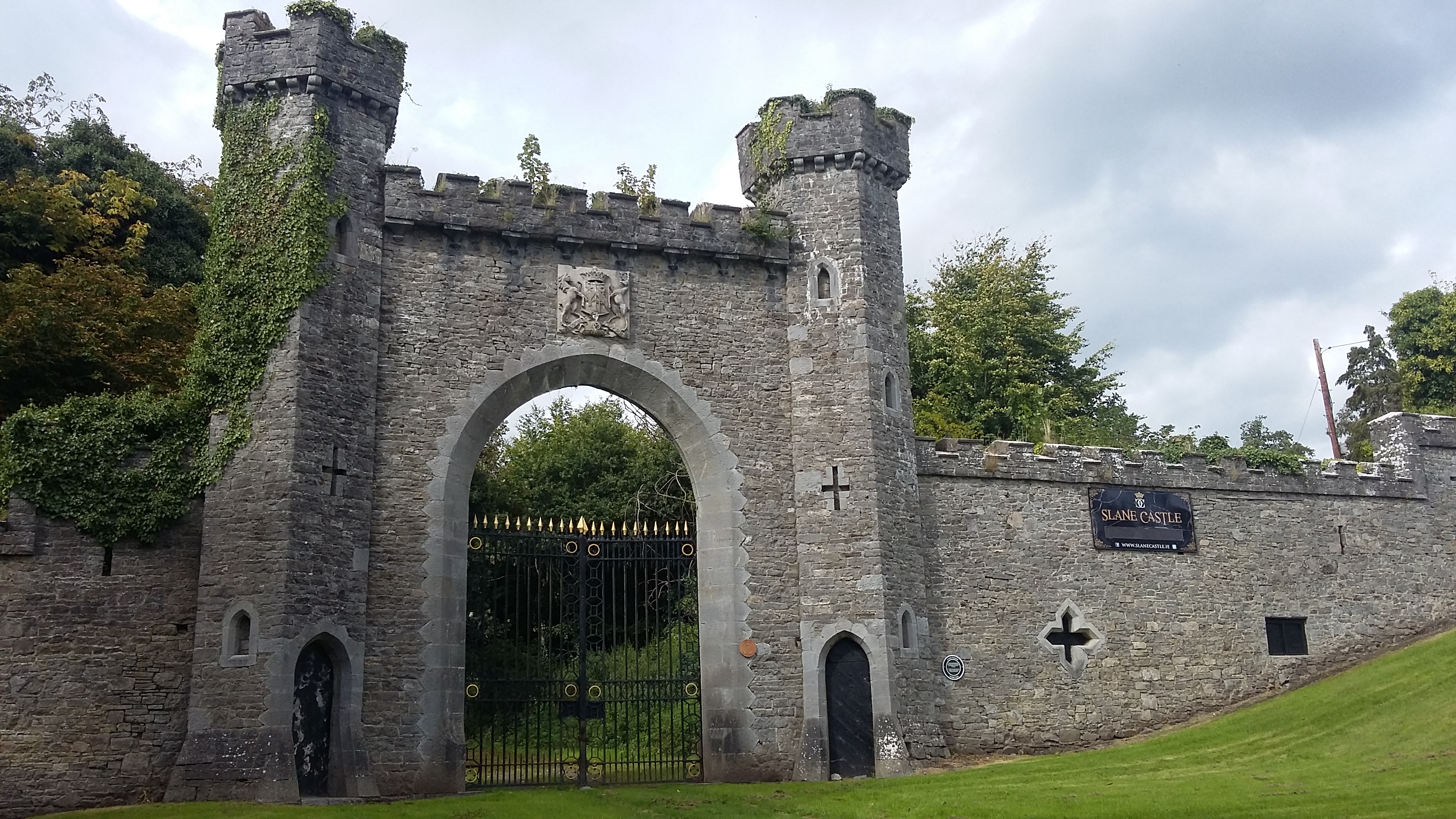
East Gate of Slane Castle

He assisted in the design of plans that were later used for St. Andrew's Church, Westland Row, Dublin, and designed the east gates of Slane Castle demesne in County Meath. In Drogheda, County Louth, he added the Gothic tower and balustrade to Saint Peter's Church of Ireland church in 1793, designed the Corn Exchange (now the Court House) in Fair Street, and designed Saint Peter's Roman Catholic Church in West Street, which was replaced by a Neo-Gothic church in 1881. He was the architect who assisted Thomas Pakenham, 2nd Earl of Longford in turning Tullynally House of County Westmeath into Tullynally Castle, completing these works in 1803. In Swords, County Dublin, he designed the Old Borough School (now a public house) on the main street, completed in 1809, and designed Saint Columba's Church of Ireland church, completed in 1818 and still in use as a place of worship.

Johnston designed the Courthouse in Duleek, County Meath. It was built c. 1838 as a sessions house for the Meath Grand Jury, commissioned by John Trotter. It was converted into a library and environmental offices in 1960.

Johnston worked on refurbishing Áras an Uachtaráin, the residence of the Irish President situated in Phoenix Park, Dublin. He took the existing red-brick ranger's lodge and had the walls plastered over and painted white, and added the portico and columns which give the house much of its neoclassical character. Under Johnson's tenure it began to look like the familiar white house known today, its new look echoed its increased importance in Irish affairs, and there has been speculation that it influenced the design of another president's house, the White House in the USA.

Johnston lived for many years in his house at 64 Eccles Street, where he kept a large collection of curiosities. He died in 1829 and was buried in St. George's churchyard, which was attached to a temporary church on Whitworth Road (later taken over by the Whitworth Hospital).
