= Parliament House, Dublin =

Building formerly housing the Parliament of Ireland

Parliament House
- Tithe na Parlaiminte
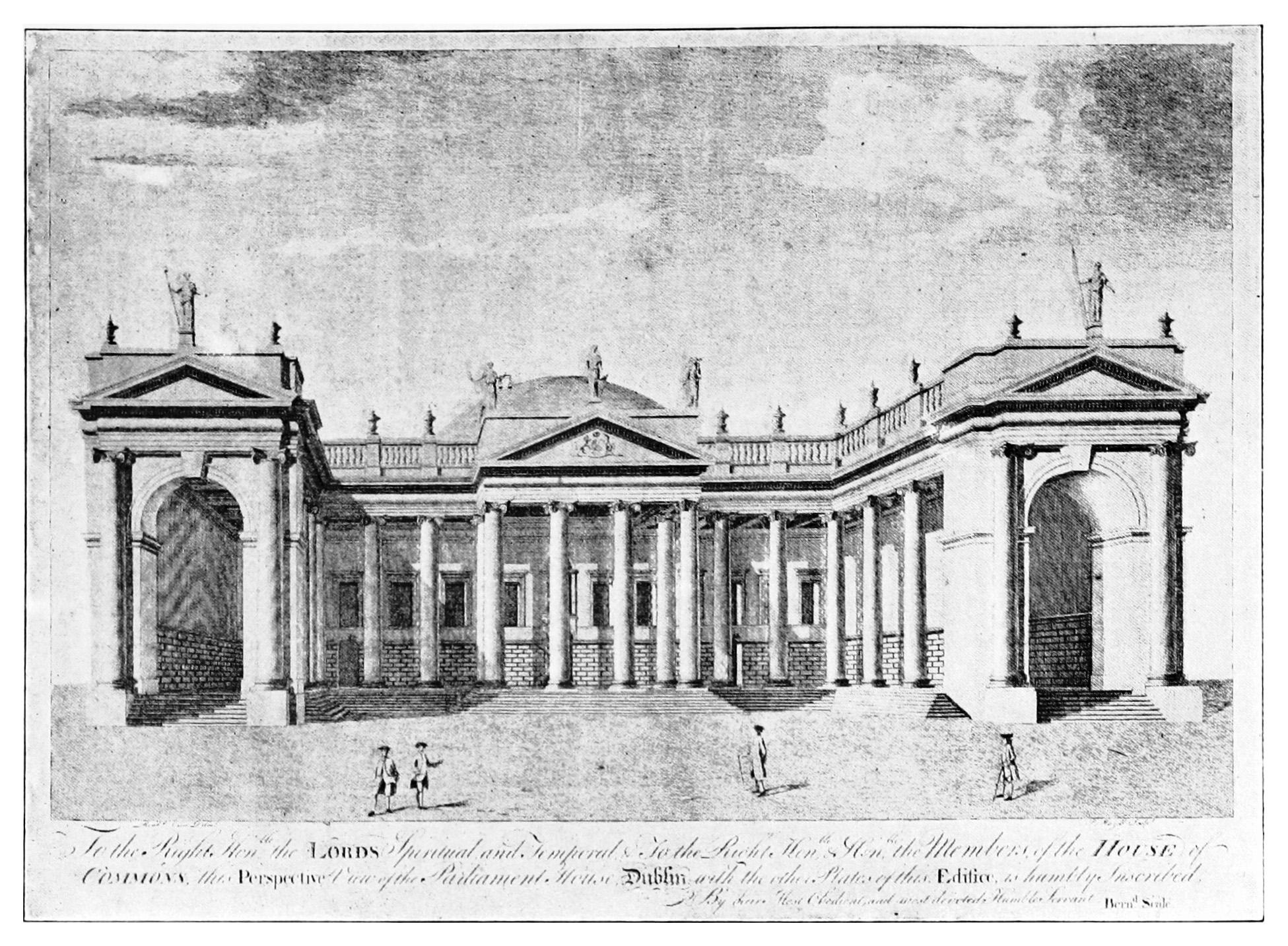

General information
- Type: Parliament
- Architectural style: Palladian; Georgian
- Location: College Green, (Entrances at Foster Place and Westmoreland Street), Dublin, Ireland
- Coordinates: 53.3449167°N 6.2612647°W
- Construction started: 1729 (Foundation stone laid 3 February 1729)
- Completed: 1739
- Owner: Bank of Ireland

Technical details
- Material: portland stone, granite

Design and construction
- Architects: Edward Lovett Pearce (1728-33); James Gandon (1782-89); Robert Parke (1787-93)
- Other designers: Richard Castle, draughtsman (1728-33)
- Quantity surveyor: Arthur Dobbs (1735-39)

Renovating team
- Architect: Francis Johnston (1803-08)

Parliament House (Irish: Tithe na Parlaiminte) is a building on College Green in Dublin which housed the Parliament of Ireland from the building's completion in the 1730s until the parliament's abolition under the Acts of Union 1800. The building has been owned by the Bank of Ireland since 1803 and served as its head office until the 1970s.

It was architecturally influential as the world's first purpose-built bicameral parliament house.

== History ==
=== Chichester House ===
The building was originally the site of Chichester House, which was built in the early 17th century on Hoggen Green (later College Green). It was built by Sir George Carew, Lord President of Munster and Lord High Treasurer of Ireland, and had been constructed on the site of a nunnery which had been disbanded by King Henry VIII at the time of the dissolution of the monasteries. Carew's house, was named for its later owner Sir Arthur Chichester, and was a building of sufficient importance to have become the temporary home of the Kingdom of Ireland's law courts during the Michaelmas law term in 1605. Most famously, the legal documentation facilitating the Plantation of Ulster had been signed there on 16 November 1612.

This building was adapted for use by the Irish Parliament in the 1670s having been formerly noted as a 'hospitall' on John Speed's Map of Dublin (1610). The structure was flanked by rows of gabled houses known as Dutch Billies, which were demolished and replaced by the Wide Streets Commission with the westerly Turnstile Alley significantly widened and straightened to become Foster Place in the 1780s and with buildings on the easterly side demolished to widen College Street and later create Westmoreland Street in the 1790s.

=== Plans for the new building ===
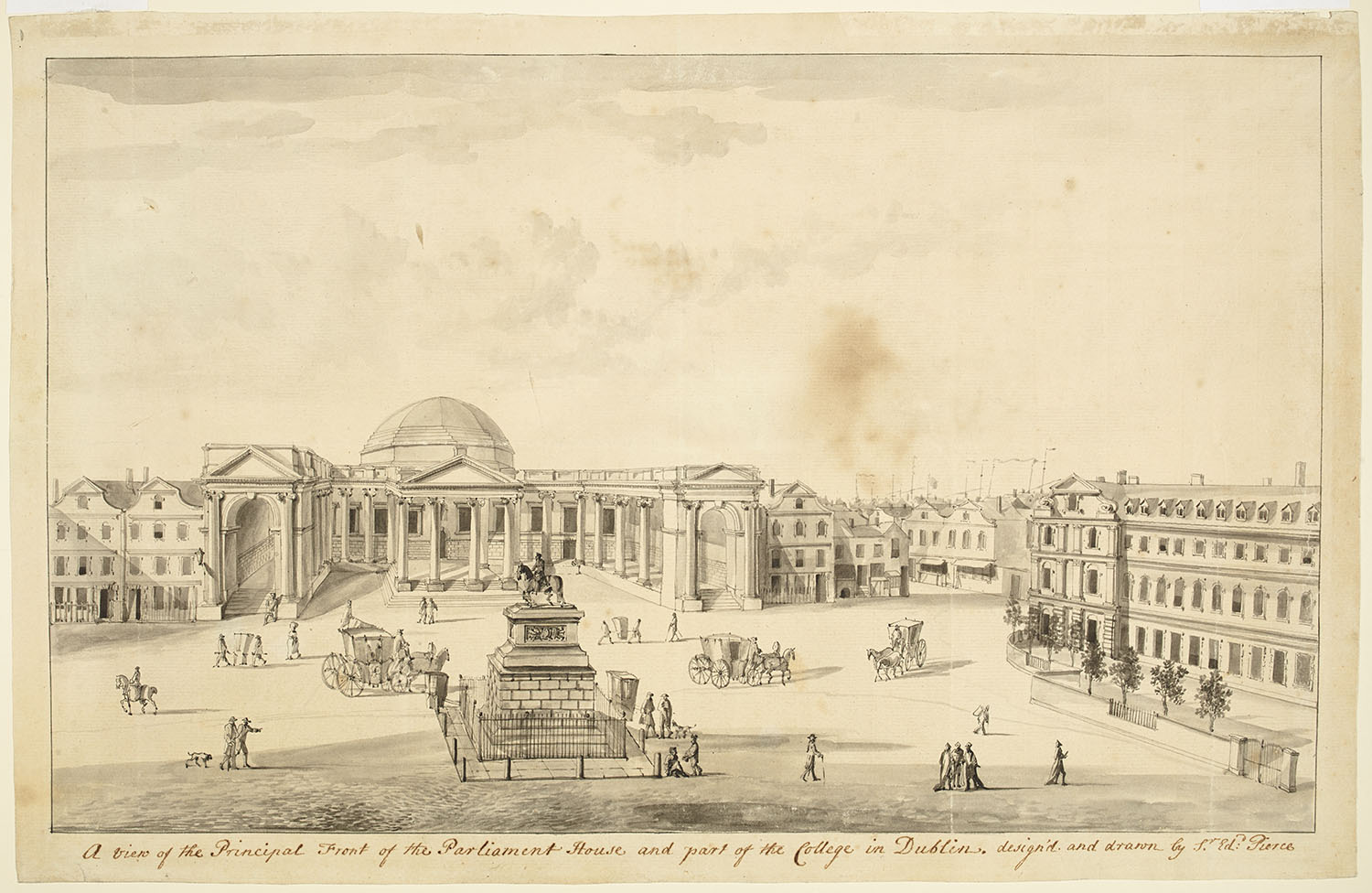
Parliament House, Dublin circa 1733

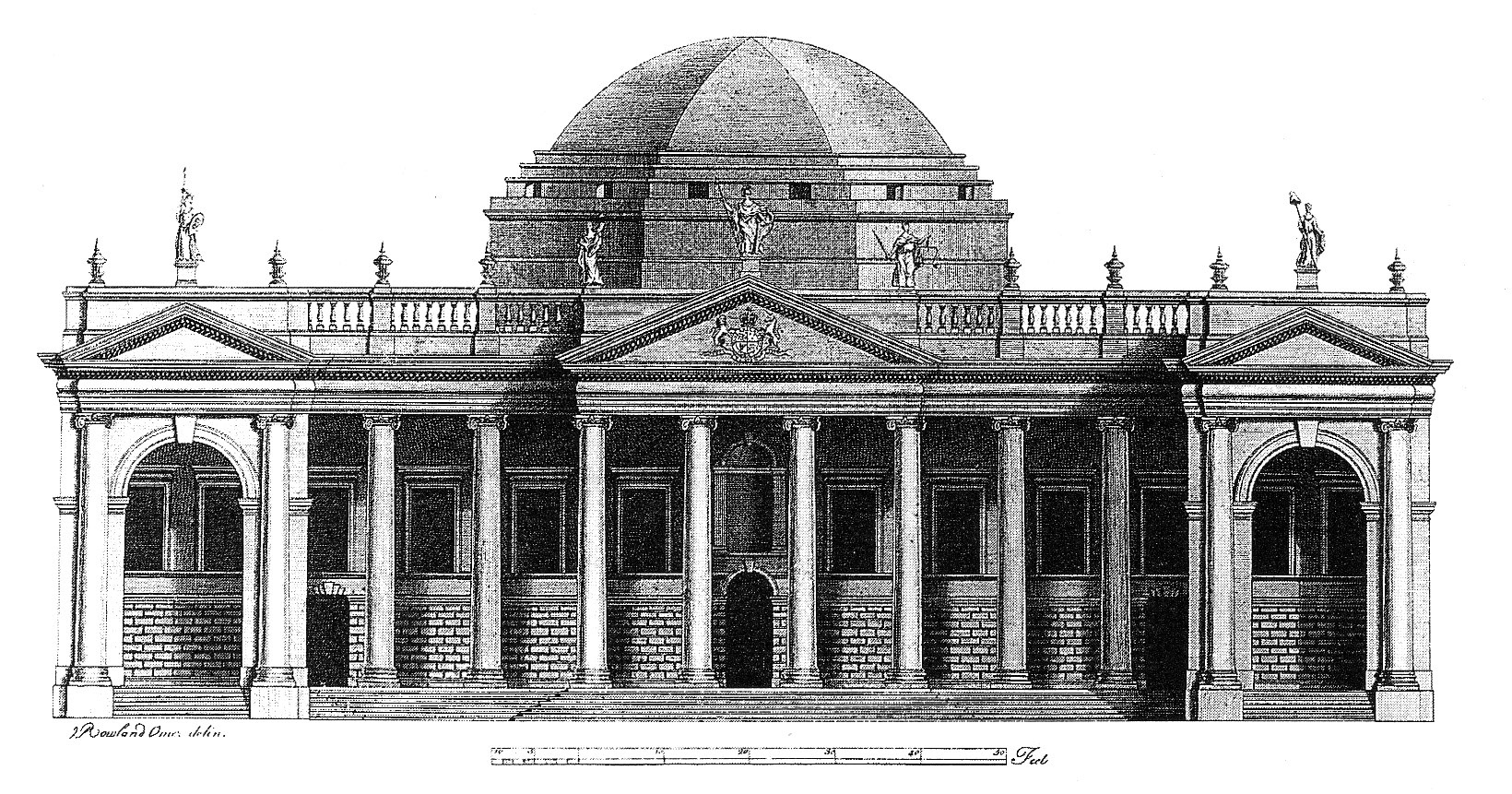
Architectural drawing of the front of Parliament House (by Peter Mazell based on the drawing by Rowland Omer, 1767)

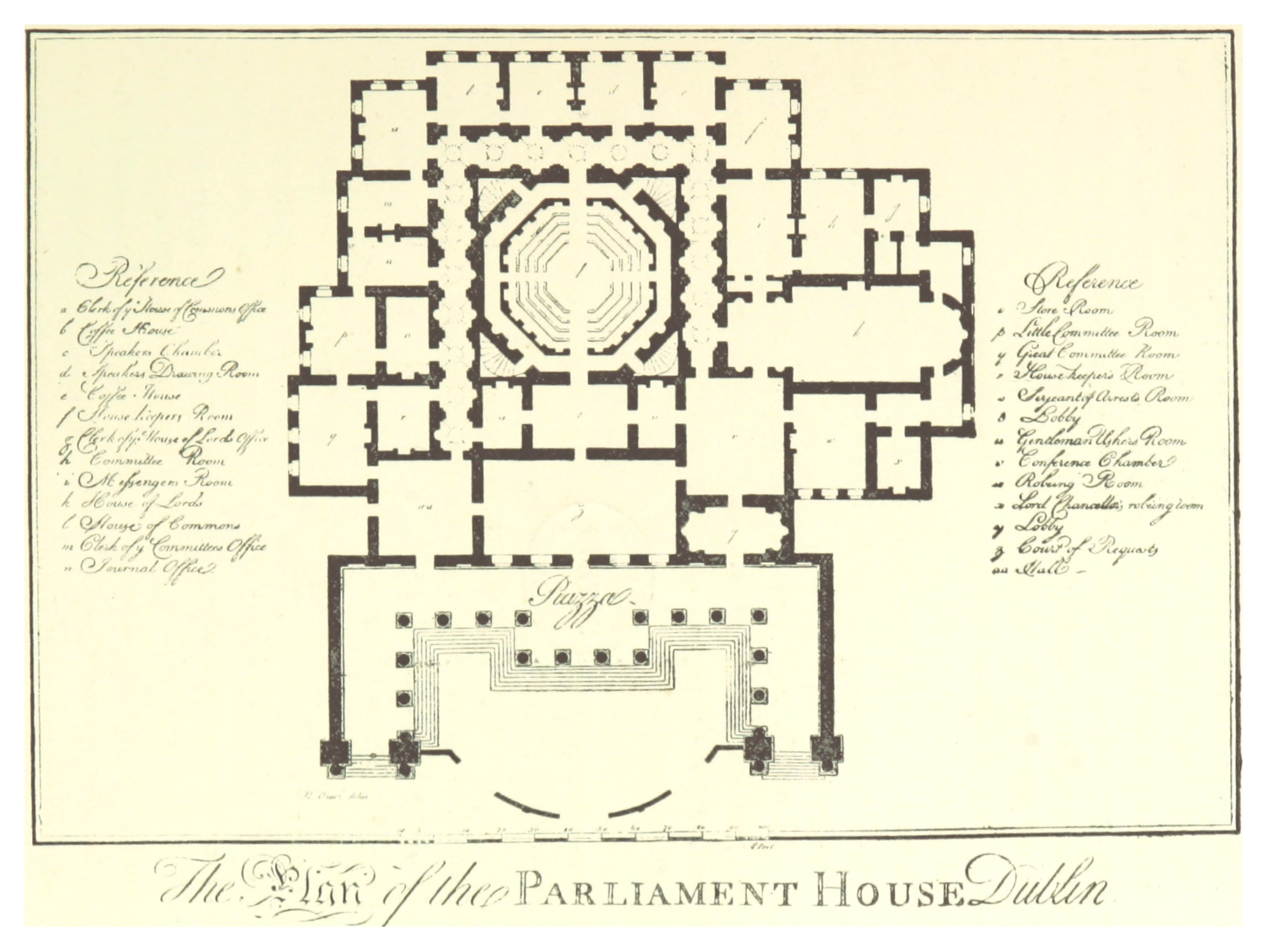
Original plan of Parliament House before its extension work. The chamber of the House of Commons was in the centre underneath the dome, the chamber of the House of Lords to the right.

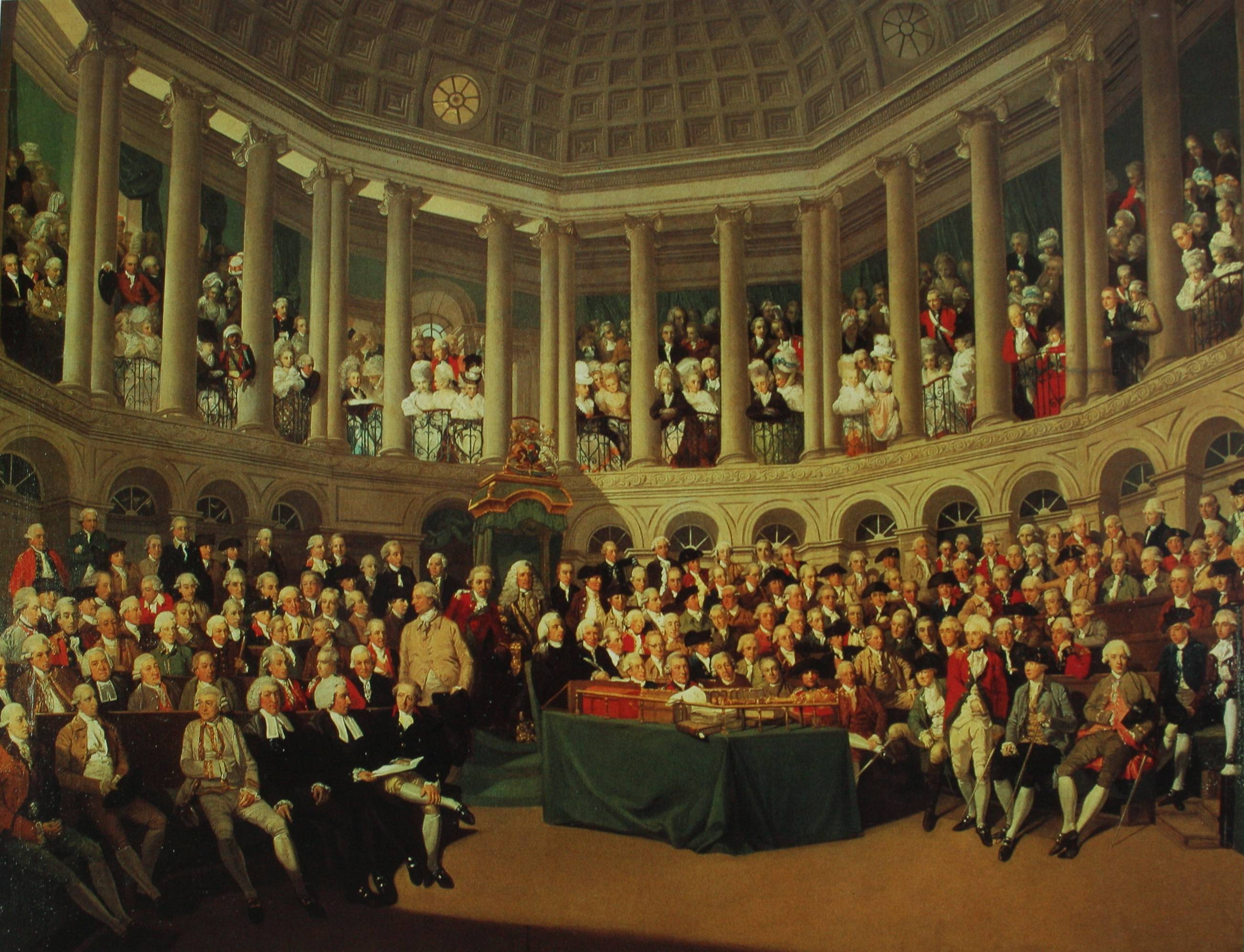
The House of Commons in session underneath the dome, in 1780 (by Francis Wheatley)

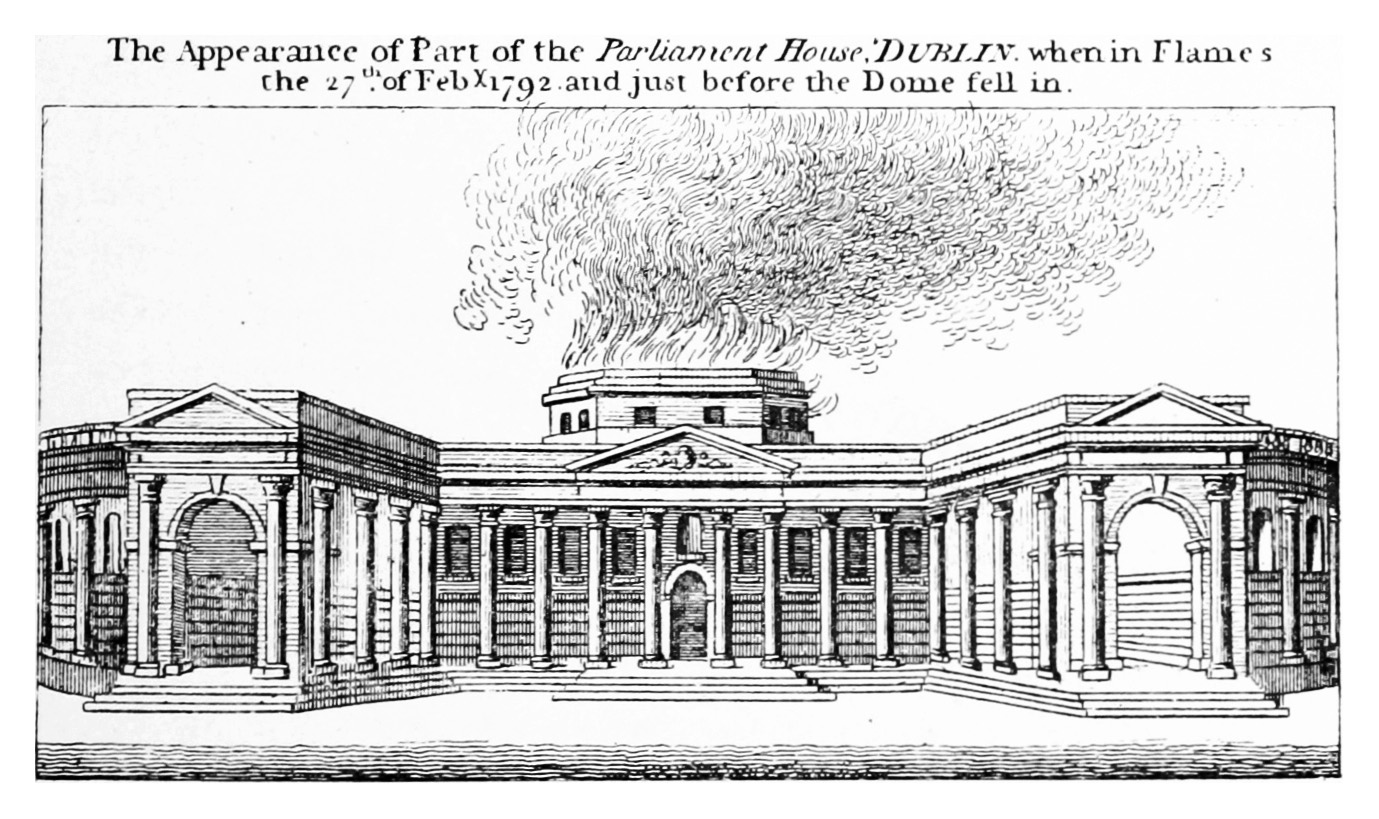
Contemporary depiction of Parliament House in flames on 27 February 1792, just before the dome fell in

Chichester House was in a dilapidated state, and unfit for official use in spite of remedial works having been carried out on the building by Thomas Burgh from 1701 to 1714.

The ancient Palace of Westminster, the seat of the English (before 1707) and, later, British Parliament, was a converted building; the House of Commons's odd seating arrangements were due to the chamber's previous existence as a chapel. Hence MPs faced each other from former pews.

In spite of this fact and the calls to upgrade and retain the building, in 1727 parliament voted to spend £6,000 on a new building on the site. It was to be the world's first purpose-built two-chamber parliament building.

The design of this building, one of two purpose-built Irish parliamentary buildings (along with Parliament Buildings, Stormont), was entrusted to an architect, Edward Lovett Pearce, who was a member of parliament and a protégé of the Speaker of the House of Commons, William Conolly of Castletown House. He won the competition to design the building beating, among others, established surveyor and architect Thomas Burgh.

During construction, Parliament moved into the Blue Coat Hospital on Dublin's northside for a period.

=== Parliament House (1729-39) ===
Parliament House Act 1729
- Act of Parliament
- Parliament of Ireland
- Long title: An Act to enable his Majesty to purchase in the respective interests of the several persons intitled to the houses and grounds adjoyning to the new Parliament-house.
- Citation: 3 Geo. 2 c. 8 (I)
- Territorial extent: Ireland

Dates
- Royal assent: 15 April 1730

The foundation stone for the new building was laid on 3 February 1729 by Thomas Wyndham, 1st Baron Wyndham, the Lord Chancellor of Ireland.

All of the top craftsmen, builders, masons and surveyors of the day worked on the building including most notably Richard Castle as assistant draughtsman.

Following the death of Lovett Pearce in December 1733, construction continued under the supervision of Arthur Dobbs.

Once completed, the building became home to the two Houses of Parliament, serving as the seat of both chambers (the Lords and Commons) of the Parliament of the Kingdom of Ireland for most of the 18th century until that parliament was abolished by the Act of Union of 1800, when Ireland became part of the United Kingdom of Great Britain and Ireland.

=== Gandon extensions (1782-89) ===
Later in the century, James Gandon designed the House of Lords entrance portico on Westmoreland Street facing down College Street as well as the screen walls connecting with the older House of Commons entrance and a new commons entrance on Foster Place. All of this work was completed between 1782 and 1789. It appears that the majority of this work was carried out after 1787 as an illustration from Henry A. Baker in that year shows the original appearance facing onto College Street without the houses cleared and without any new portico or screen wall.

=== Robert and Edward Parke extensions (1787-93) ===
Around this time, Robert Parke (1787–92) and later his successor Edward Parke (1787–93) also carried out works on the House of Commons and are often credited with designing an ionic colonnade around Foster Place. This also followed the collapse of the dome over the commons in 1792 following a fire. The colonnade appears to have never have been popular however and was filled in with a matching screen wall to match the Gandonian appearance of the Eastern screen wall a decade later when Francis Johnston was making alterations for the Bank of Ireland.

== Design ==
Pearce's design was revolutionary. The building was effectively semi-circular in shape, occupying nearly 6,000 m^{2} (1.5 acres). Unlike Chichester House, which was set far back from Hoggen Green, the new building opened directly onto the Green. The principal entrance consisted of a colonnade of Ionic columns extending around three sides of the entrance quadrangle, forming a letter E (see picture below). Three statues, representing Hibernia (the Latin name for Ireland), Fidelity and Commerce (later carved by Edward Smyth) stood above the portico. Over the main entrance, the royal coat of arms was cut in stone.

According to Patrick Wyse Jackson, curator of the Geological Museum at Trinity College Dublin, the granite used in the central 'piazza' of the Parliament House may have come from the Baltyboys quarry close to Blessington, where contemporary documents show that one William Borrowdale was paid £6-16s-2d for 'mountain stone' on 24 December 1729. It is known that granite quarrying had been taking place in west Wicklow since the early 1700s from several openings at Baltyboys, and "from 1740 in more significant volumes at Woodend and Threecastles nearby and then from Golden Hill."

The Parliament House is also noteworthy for its decorations, which, unusually, were carved from granite as opposed to a more malleable stone. Wyse Jackson notes that "they would have been difficult to produce, on account of the coarse texture of the rock, and so reflect the considerable skills of the stonemasons. It is unusual to find granite so delicately carved".

The building underwent extensions by architect James Gandon, between 1785 and 1789 he added a new House of Lords entrance at the east of the building, facing onto Westmoreland Street. Unlike the main entrance to the south, which came to be known as the House of Commons entrance, the new peers' entrance used six Corinthian columns, at the request of peers who wished their entrance to be distinct from the Ionic columns of the main entrance. Over this, three statues by Edward Smyth were placed, representing Fortitude, Justice and Liberty. A curved wall joined the Pearce entrance to Gandon's extension. This masked the uneven joins of some of the extensions, as shown below. The wall, built of granite was also inset with blind niches.

Another extension was added on the west side into Foster Place, designed in 1787 by architect Robert Parke; while matching Gandon's portico, he tried a different solution, linking the other portico to the main Pearce one by a set of Ionic columns in a colonnade. The result was poorly received and when the Bank of Ireland took over the building, it employed Francis Johnston to create an architectural unity by replacing this set of Ionic columns by a curved wall in line with Gandon's original design. Ionic columns were then added to both curved walls, giving the extensions an architectural and visual unity that had been lacking and producing the building's ultimate exterior.

The interior contained one unusual and highly symbolic feature. While in many converted parliamentary buildings where both houses met in the same building, the houses were given equality or indeed the upper house was given a more prominent location within the building, in the new Irish Houses of Parliament the House of Commons was featured, with its octagonal parliamentary chamber located in the building's centre. The smaller House of Lords was given a lesser position nearby.

The original, domed House of Commons chamber was destroyed by fire in the 1790s, and a less elaborate new chamber, without a dome, was rebuilt in the same location and opened in 1796, four years before the Parliament's ultimate abolition.

=== Materials ===
Patrick Wyse Jackson, curator of the Geological Museum in Trinity College, assessed the building in 1993 and noted the following:

"It has a façade forty-seven metres long with a portico supported by impressive Ionic columns. The building has Calp Limestone rubble walls, which have been faced with Portland Stone. If you look closely at this stone you will find that it is full of shells, predominantly fossils of oyster shells... (The interior) contains a fireplace of black Kilkenny Marble. The Cash Office is floored in a chessboard pattern with slabs of Cork Red Marble alternating with Portland Stone."

== Pearce's design copied ==
Pearce's designs came to be studied and copied both at home and abroad. The Viceregal Apartments in Dublin Castle imitated his top-lit corridors. The British Museum in Bloomsbury in London copied his colonnaded main entrance. His impact reached Washington, D.C., where Pearce's building, and in particular his octagonal House of Commons chamber, was studied as plans were made for the United States Capitol building. While the shape of the chamber was not replicated, some of its decorative motifs were, with the ceiling structure in the Old Senate Chamber and old House of Representatives chamber (now the Statuary Hall) bearing a striking resemblance to Pearce's ceiling in the House of Commons.

The uniqueness of the building, the quality of its workmanship and its central location in College Green, across from Trinity College Dublin, made it one of Dublin's most highly regarded structures.

== Public ceremonies ==
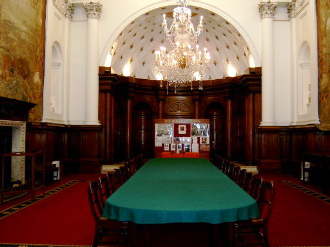
The House of Lords chamber. In the apse on a dais is where the Lord Lieutenant's throne was placed.

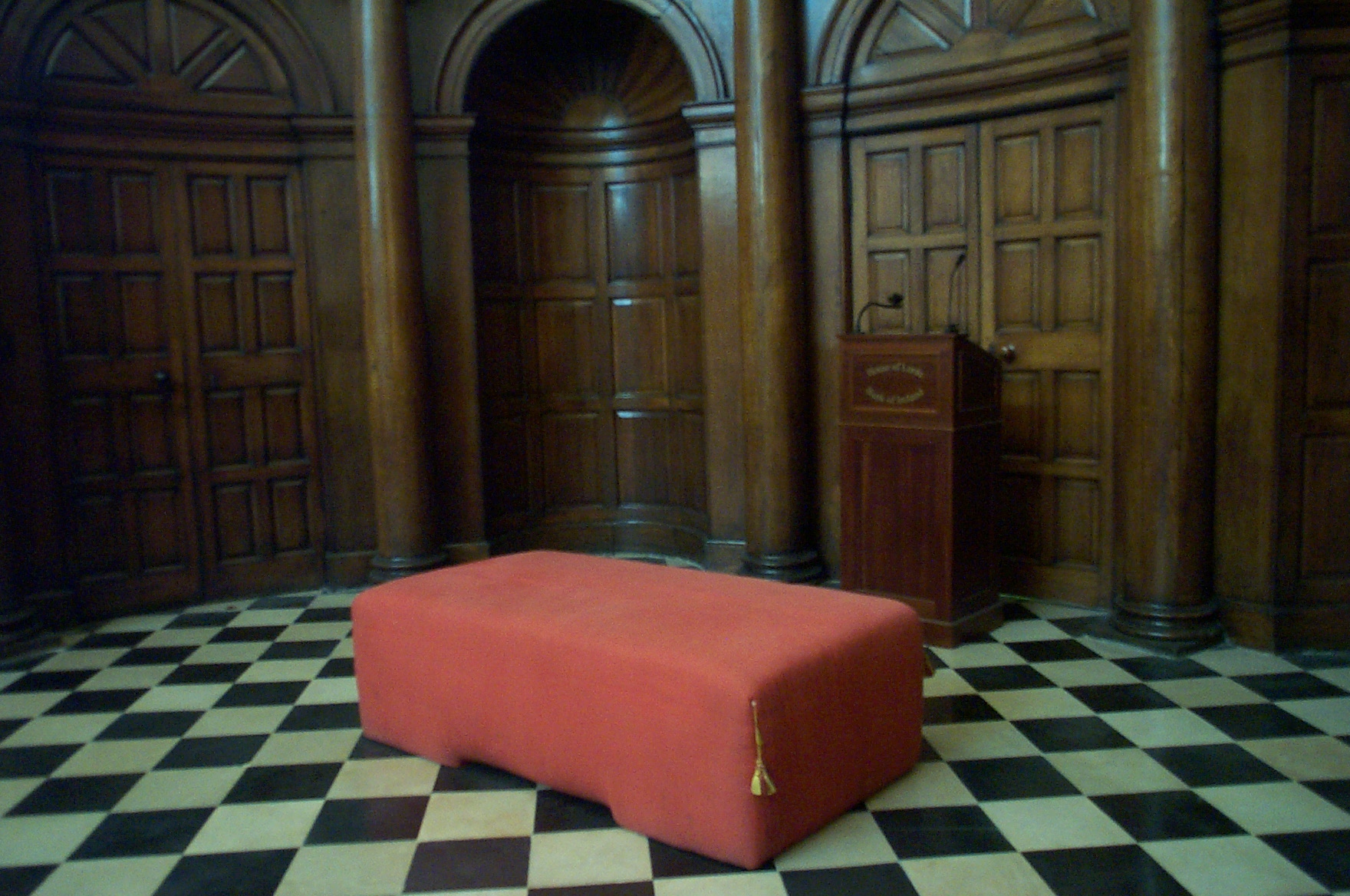
The Woolsack was used by the Lord Chancellor when chairing the House of Lords.

Much of the public ceremonies mirrored those of the British Houses of Parliament. Sessions were formally opened by a Speech from the Throne by the Lord Lieutenant, who "used to sit, surrounded by more splendour than His Majesty on the throne of England". The Sovereign's official representative, when he sat on the Throne, sat beneath a canopy of crimson velvet.

As in the English and British parliaments, the House of Lords was presided over by the Lord Chancellor, who sat on the Woolsack, a large seat stuffed with wool, which was seen as a symbol of economic success and wealth. At the State Opening of Parliament, Members were summoned from the nearby House of Commons chamber by White Rod, (as opposed to Black Rod in Westminster).

In the Commons, business was presided over by the Speaker, who in the absence of a government chosen from and answerable to the Commons was the dominant parliamentary figure. Speaker William Conolly remains today one of the most widely known figures ever to be produced by an Irish parliament, for his role in Parliament and for the wealth that allowed him to build one of Ireland's greatest Georgian houses, Castletown House.

Sessions of parliament drew many of the wealthiest of Ireland's Anglo-Irish Ascendancy to Dublin, particularly as sessions often coincided with the Irish Social Season, running from January to 17 March (St. Patrick's Day), when the Lord Lieutenant presided in state over state balls and drawing rooms in the Viceregal Apartments in Dublin Castle. Leading peers flocked to Dublin, where they lived in enormous and richly decorated townhouses, initially on the Northside of Dublin, later in new Georgian residences around Merrion Square and Fitzwilliam Square. Their presence in Dublin, along with large numbers of servants, provided a regular boost to the city's economy.

The abolition of the Parliament in 1800 had a major economic impact. Within a decade, many of the finest mansions (including Leinster House, Powerscourt House, and Aldborough House) had been sold, often to government agencies. Though Parliament itself was based on the exclusion of the vast Irish Catholic majority in Ireland, many nationalist historians and writers blamed the absence of Parliament for Dublin's increased impoverishment, with many of the large mansions in areas like Henrietta Street sold to property developers and landlords who reduced them to tenements.

The draw of the Viceregal Court and its social season was no longer enough to encourage most Irish peers and their entourages to come to Dublin. Their absence, with all their collective spending, severely damaged the Dublin economy, which went into dramatic decline. By the 1830s and 1840s, nationalist leader Daniel O'Connell was leading demand for the Repeal of the Act of Union and the re-establishment of an Irish parliament in Dublin, only this time one to which Catholics could be elected, in contrast with the earlier Anglican-only assembly.

Edgar F. Keatinge, writing in the Dublin Historical Record in 1947, recalled his visits to the building:

"We frequently went down to the Bank of Ireland, College Green, to watch the 10 a.m. ceremony of "changing the guard," another very colourful daily incident in the life of Dublin. All these things were part of the history of Dublin at that time, and they certainly provided a life, a movement, a colour, entirely unknown to-day."

== Abolition ==
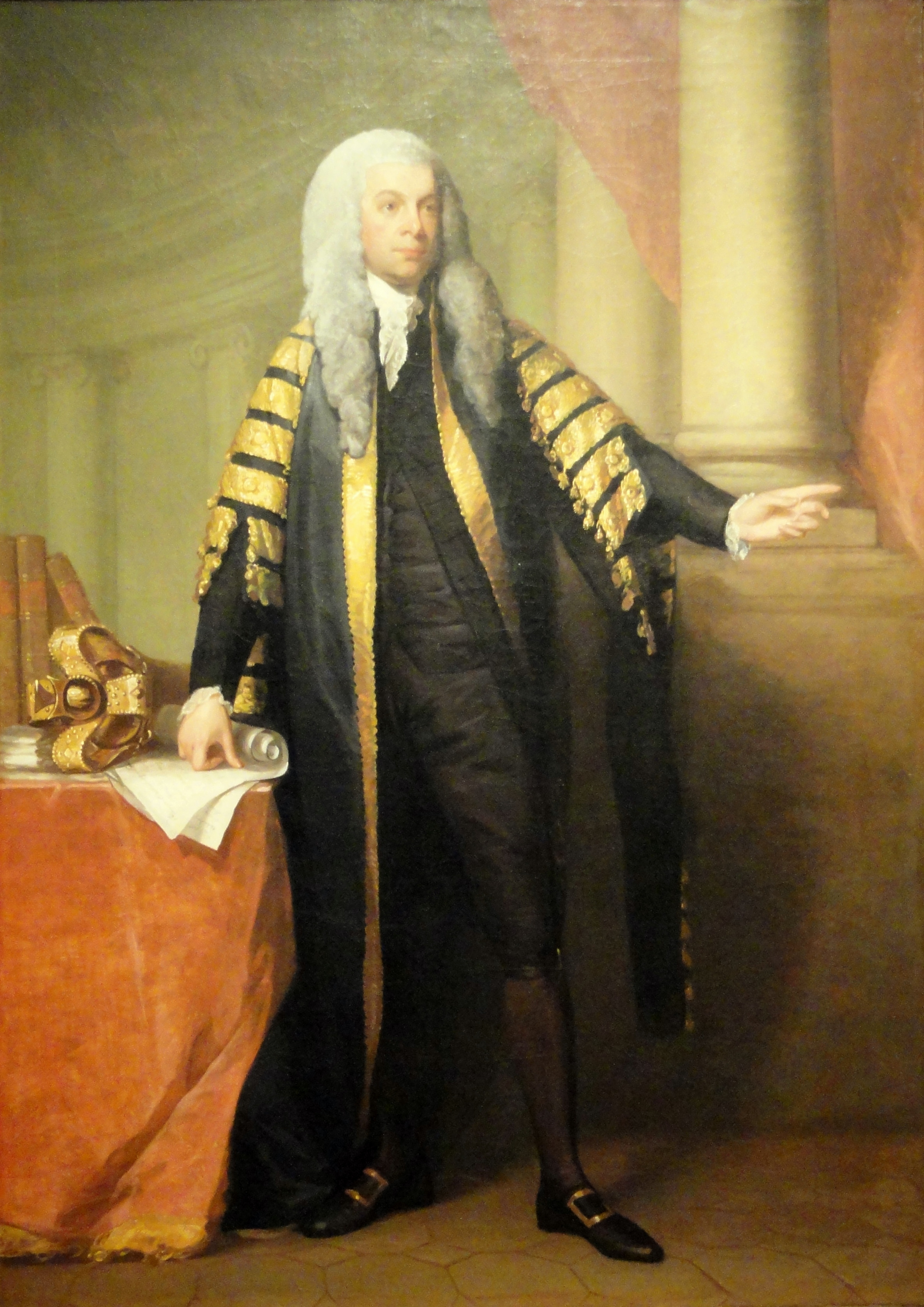
John Foster, last speaker of the Irish House of Commons

In the last thirty years of the Irish parliament, a series of crises and reforms changed its role. In 1782, following agitation by major parliamentary figures, but most notably Henry Grattan, the severe restrictions such as Poynings' Law that effectively controlled the Irish parliament's ability to control its own legislative agenda were removed, producing what was known as the Constitution of 1782. A little over a decade later, Roman Catholics, who were by far the demographic majority, were allowed to cast votes in elections to Parliament, though they were still barred from office. The crisis over the "madness" of King George III produced a major strain in Anglo-Irish relations, as the King's parliaments possessed the theoretical right to nominate a regent without the requirement that they choose the same person. Eventually the crisis passed with the King's recovery.

The British Government decided the entire relationship between Britain and Ireland should be changed, with the merger of both kingdoms and their parliaments. After one failed attempt, this finally was achieved, albeit with mass bribery of members of both Houses, who were awarded British and United Kingdom peerages and other "encouragements". In August 1800 Parliament held its last session in the Irish Houses of Parliament. On 1 January 1801, the Kingdom of Ireland and its Parliament officially ceased to exist and the new United Kingdom of Great Britain and Ireland came into being, with a united parliament meeting in Westminster, to which Ireland sent approximately 100 members, while peers in the Peerage of Ireland had the constant right to elect a number of fellow Irish peers as Irish representative peers to represent Ireland in the House of Lords, on the model already introduced for Scottish peers.

== After 1800: Bank ==
Parliament House Act 1802
- Act of Parliament
- Parliament of the United Kingdom
- Long title: An Act to enable the Lord High Treasurer, or Commissioners of his Majesty’s Treasury of Ireland for the Time being, to sell, lease, convey, or dispose of the Parliament House in the City of Dublin, and all the Premises and Appurtenances thereunto belonging, to the Governor and Company of the Bank of Ireland.
- Citation: 42 Geo. 3. c. 87
- Territorial extent: United Kingdom

Dates
- Royal assent: 22 June 1802
- Commencement: 22 June 1802 (Note: The Acts of Parliament (Commencement) Act 1793.)

Status: Current legislation

Text of statute as originally enacted

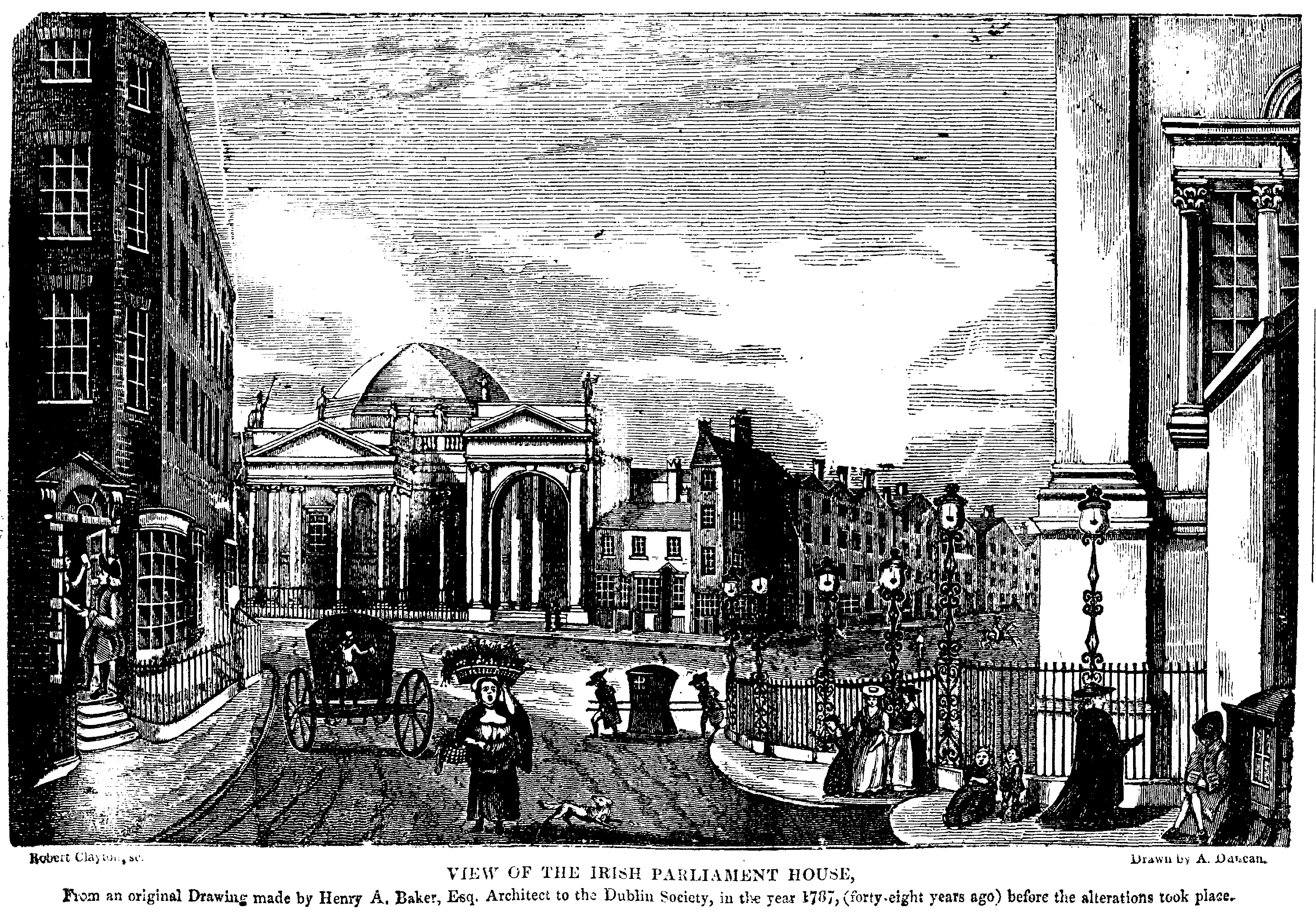
View of Parliament House, from an original drawing made by Henry A. Baker, Architect to the Dublin Society, in the year 1787. The dome can be seen, and also the residential houses along College Street (today Westmoreland Street) that were later demolished for the wing under James Gandon by 1789.

Initially, the former Parliament House was used for a variety of purposes, including as a military garrison and as an art gallery. In 1803 the fledgling Bank of Ireland bought the building from the British Government for £40,000 for use as its headquarters. As a result, the chamber was broken up to form small offices and by a magnificent cash office. Architect Francis Johnston (then the most prominent architect working in Ireland) was employed to oversee the conversion. However, the House of Lords chamber survived almost unscathed. It was used as the bank's board room until the 1970s when the bank moved its headquarters. The chamber is now open to the public and is used for various public functions, including music recitals.

== Continuing symbolism ==
Some of the building's contents survived. The ceremonial mace of the House of Commons remained in the family of the last Speaker of the House of Commons, John Foster. The Bank of Ireland bought the mace at a sale in Christie's in London in 1937. The Chair of the Speaker of the House of Commons is now in the possession of the Royal Dublin Society, while a bench from the Commons is in the Royal Irish Academy. Two original tapestries remain in the House of Lords. Designed by Dutch landscape painter Willem Van der Hagen, and woven by John van Beaver, dating from circa 1733, the tapestries are unique. One represents the "Battle of the Boyne" and the other the "Defence of Londonderry". Each tapestry has five portrait and narrative medallions around the central scene that depict, narrate and name central characters and events in the battles. Both also have "trophies of arms and figures of Fame below enclosed by fringed curtains". The chandelier of the House of Commons now hangs in the Examination Hall of Trinity College Dublin. The Woolsack, on which the Lord Chancellor of Ireland sat when chairing sessions of the House of Lords, is now back on display in the chamber. Copies of debates of the old Irish Parliament are now kept in Leinster House, keeping a direct link between the two eras.

== Re-establishment of a Parliament in Dublin ==
From the 1830s under Daniel O'Connell, generations of leaders campaigned for the creation of a new Irish parliament, convinced that the Act of Union had been a great mistake. While O'Connell campaigned for full-scale repeal, leaders like Isaac Butt and Charles Stewart Parnell sought a more modest form of Home Rule within the United Kingdom, rather than an independent Irish state. Leaders from O'Connell to Parnell and later John Redmond spoke of the proud day on which an Irish parliament might once again meet in what they called Grattan's Parliament in College Green. When, in 1911, King George V and his consort Queen Mary visited Dublin (where they attracted mass crowds), street sellers sold drawings of the King and Queen arriving in the not-too-distant future at the Old Houses of Parliament in College Green.

In late April 1916, a small band of radical Republicans under Patrick Pearse staged the Easter Rising, in which they seized a number of prominent Irish buildings, mainly in Dublin, and proclaimed an Irish Republic. One building they did not take over was the old Parliament House. Perhaps they feared that, as a bank, it would be heavily protected. Perhaps, expecting that the Rising would ultimately fail and that the reaction to the Rising and what Pearse called their "blood sacrifice", rather than the Rising itself, would reawaken Irish nationalism and produce independence, they did not seek to use the building for fear that it, like the GPO, would be destroyed in the British counter-attack. Or perhaps, because of its association with a former Ascendancy parliament, it carried little symbolism for them. The rising eventually led to the partitioning of Ireland and the establishment of the Irish Free State, which was a British Dominion rather than a form of Home Rule.

== The Dáil ==
In January 1919, Irish republican MPs elected in the 1918 general election assembled to form the First Dáil and issued a Unilateral Declaration of Independence. They chose the Round Room of the Mansion House, the official residence of the Lord Mayor of Dublin for their home. (The Round Room had more royal connections than the old Parliament House; it had been built for the visit of King George IV in 1821.)

It is highly unlikely that the Bank of Ireland, then with a largely Unionist board (some of whom were directly descended from members of the former Irish Parliament), would have supplied the building for such use. The building was also a working bank and headquarters. In 1921 the British Government created a House of Commons of Southern Ireland through the Government of Ireland Act 1920 (also known as the Fourth Home Rule Act), though only four MPs (all unionists) assembled for the State Opening of Parliament by the Lord Lieutenant, which was held in the Royal College of Science rather than the old Parliament House. Section 66 of the 1920 Act stated that once the Government of Southern Ireland had provided alternative accommodation for the bank and compensation for moving, the old Parliament House would become vested in "His Majesty for the use of the Parliament of Southern Ireland". However, the House of Commons of Southern Ireland failed to operate, no Government of Southern Ireland was ever formed, superseded by the Irish Free State.

In 1922, when the Provisional Government under W. T. Cosgrave made its plans for independence, it gave little thought to the old Parliament House. In addition to dealing with the bank, it lacked room around it for additional buildings to be used for governmental purposes. Directly behind it, was a major street called Fleet Street. In front of it, at both the Lords and Commons entrances, were major thoroughfares, College Green and Westmoreland Street, leaving the only space for expansion on its Foster Place side, which also had little space for offices. Finally, in the Ireland of 1922 with a civil war raging, the building was not secure enough to be used as a modern-day parliament.

As a result, the Free State initially hired Leinster House from its then-owner, the Royal Dublin Society, in 1922, before buying it in 1924. Longer-term plans either to convert the Royal Hospital Kilmainham, into a national parliament or to build a new parliament house, all fell through, leaving Leinster House as the accidental result.

== Modern view ==
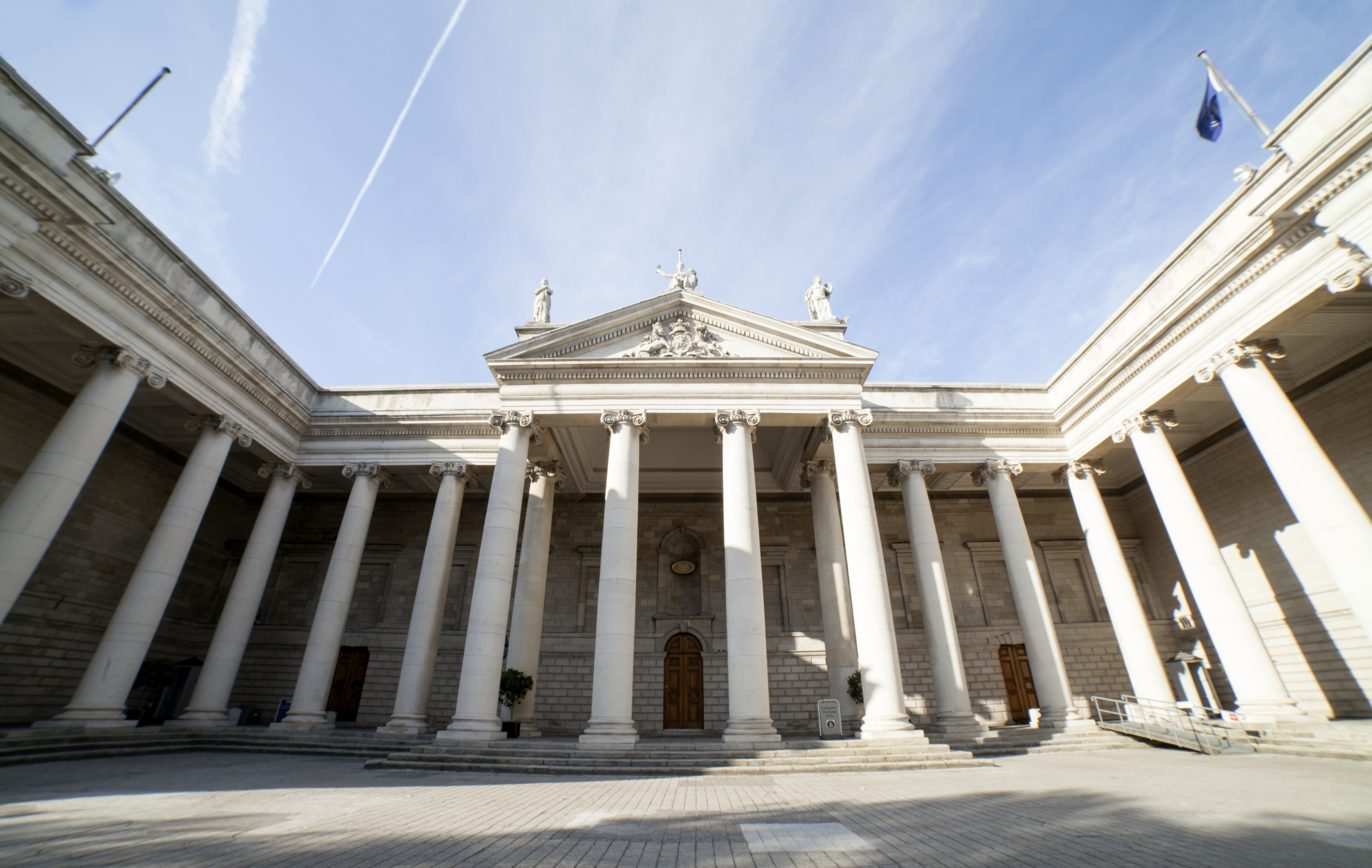
The main entrance, with the portico and plaza in front of it, of the former Parliament House as it appeared in 2015

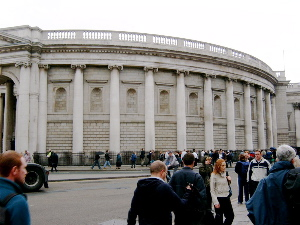
The "screen wall" that joins the original entrance to Gandon's extension. This is the most recognisable image of the building, though ironically, while originally built by Gandon, it was given its modern appearance by the Bank of Ireland. A matching screen wall faces onto Foster Place on the other side of the building.

The house is seen generally with affection by Dubliners. It was used as a symbol by generations of nationalist leaders from Daniel O'Connell to Charles Stewart Parnell and John Redmond in their own quest for Irish self-government.

To this day some still lobby for the re-establishment of the College Green House of Parliament. In 2006, the Minister for Communications, Energy and Natural Resources, Eamon Ryan, met with Bank of Ireland's chief executive and chair to propose the building for an electronic library. In 2010, Minister of State Seán Haughey proposed that the building be handed over to the state in return for the Irish state's bailout of the bank during the Irish banking crisis. Both suggestions were rejected by the bank.

Other suggestions included that the building be used to house the bank's former art collection, that it be used as an office for an elected Lord Mayor of Dublin or that it house the Dáil or Seanad and act as a parliament building again. In 2011, Jimmy Deenihan, Minister for Arts, Heritage and the Gaeltacht, wrote to the bank setting out proposals to acquire the building as a venue for the state to use as a cultural venue and requesting a meeting with the bank's Governor. TD Kevin Humphreys in 2012 also called for the bank to return the building to the state.

== Restoration works ==
In 1976, almost 250 years after the foundation stone was laid, a series of restoration works were carried out on the building. Cleaning of the stone was required, as was replacing of some of the granite pieces, and remoulding of the portland stone. The stone cut contractor, Jim Murphy, noted how the Bank of Ireland had been lucky they contacted him when they did as the particular stonecutters who were good at this sort of work, and familiar with the handwork required, were available for work but were all in their 60s by that point and might not have been available in a further 10 or 20 years.

RTÉ Radio 1 interviewed a number of stonecutters working at a height on the bank, who were using granite sourced from the Barnacullia quarries on the slopes of Three Rock Mountain, Dublin. The granite was cut and dressed at the yard in Barnacullia, from where it was brought to the bank to be further trimmed and fitted into place. The stoneworkers working on the bank were sourced from Barnacullia itself, as well as from the Ballyknockan granite quarries in County Wicklow.

One of the workers remarked that the quality of some of the rock had diminished to such a degree that it was "only dust now instead of granite". He pointed out marks of imperfection in the stone known as "white horse" that would need to be changed. The man also thought forward to the future and the next time the building would need to be restored, and wondered where the "next stone cutters are going to come from to do it" as there were "no young fellas going to the trade" and the machines couldn't "finish a stone" no matter how good the machine was.

By 1981, restorations were still ongoing and an episode of the TV series Hands followed the work of some of the stoneworkers onsite for its episode entitled 'Stone'. The episode depicted the work of Paddy Roe, a stonecutter from the Dublin Mountains, who was working on a replacement right hand for the statue of Hibernia (the female personification of Ireland) which stands as the central statue on the south pediment of the building. Roe had also carved Hibernia a new head, although this was not shown in the episode. Concurrent to being a stonecutter, Roe was also a teacher of stone carving at the National College of Art and Design at the time. The episode also filmed workmen setting a replacement facing wall of granite blocks at the building, and Ballyknockan stoneworker George Flynn grouting the base of an ionic column.

== Appraisal ==
An 1890 guidebook to Ireland, produced at a time when Ireland was still part of the United Kingdom of Great Britain and Ireland, gives an overview of the building to the tourist:

Opposite the former is the old Parliament House, now the Bank of Ireland... The building was begun in 1729 with the main-front. The E. front was added somewhat later, and the W. front was not completed till abt. 1790. (To view the interior apply to one of the bank-porters in the central vestibule; an order from the Secy. is required to see the bank-note printing.) The old House of Commons was in the centre of the building, where the Board Room and Accountants' office now are. The present Cash Office was built by the Bank on the site of the old Court of Requests. The House of Lords is little altered, except that a statue of George III., by Bacon, occupies the position of the Throne. Two pieces of tapestry: "Siege of Derry" and "Battle of the Boyne," and the handsome chimney-pieces should be noticed. The Bank holds the premises under a perpetual lease, without any quit-rent.

=== Gallery ===
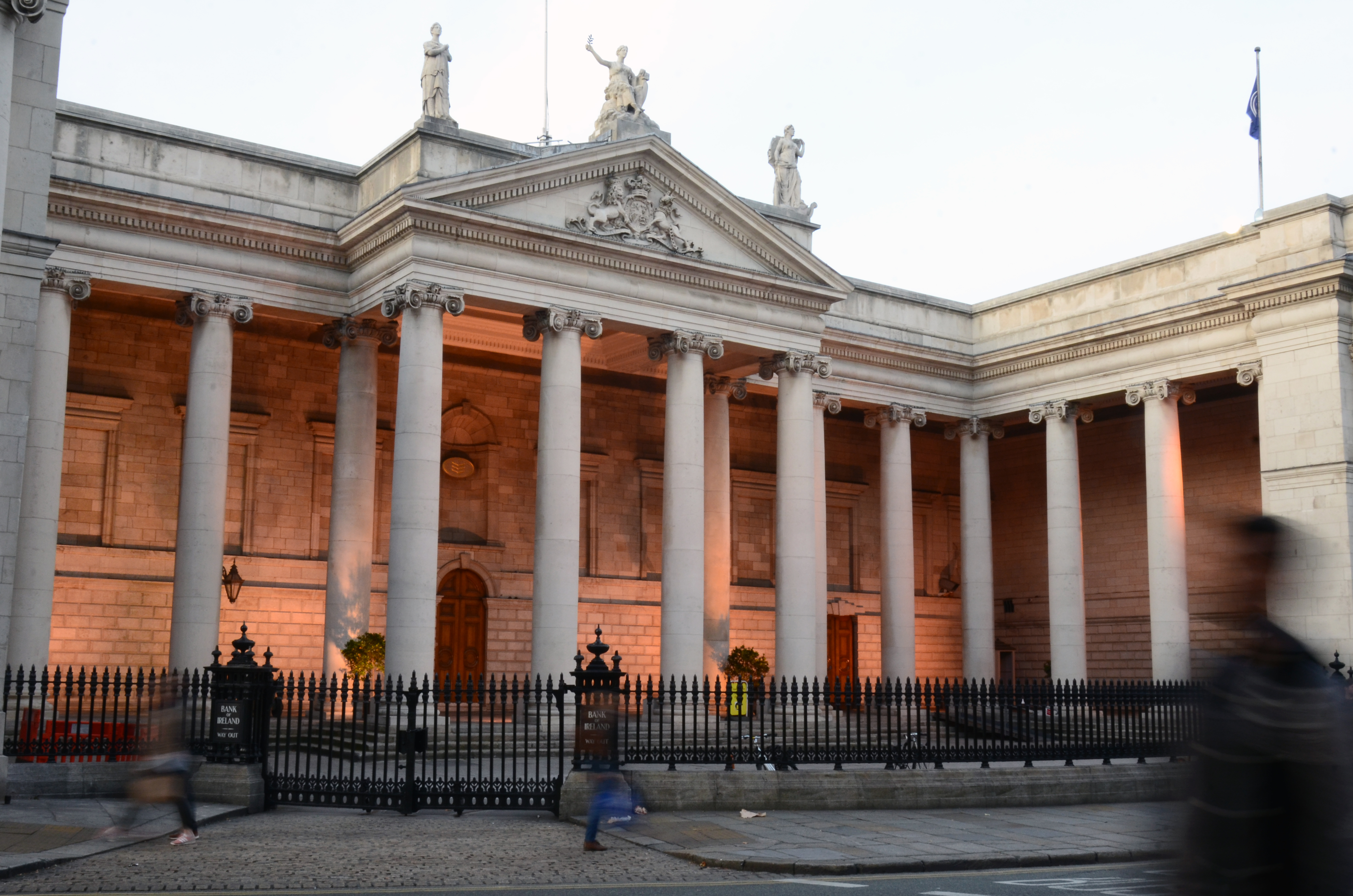
House of Commons entrance in 2015

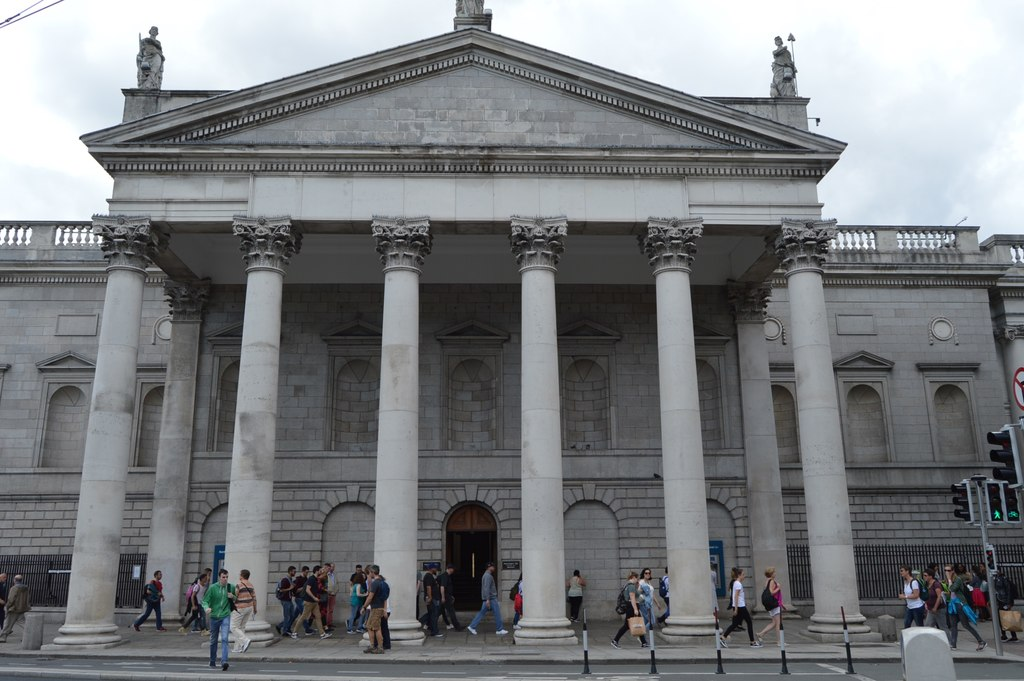
House of Lords (Peers) entrance in 2018

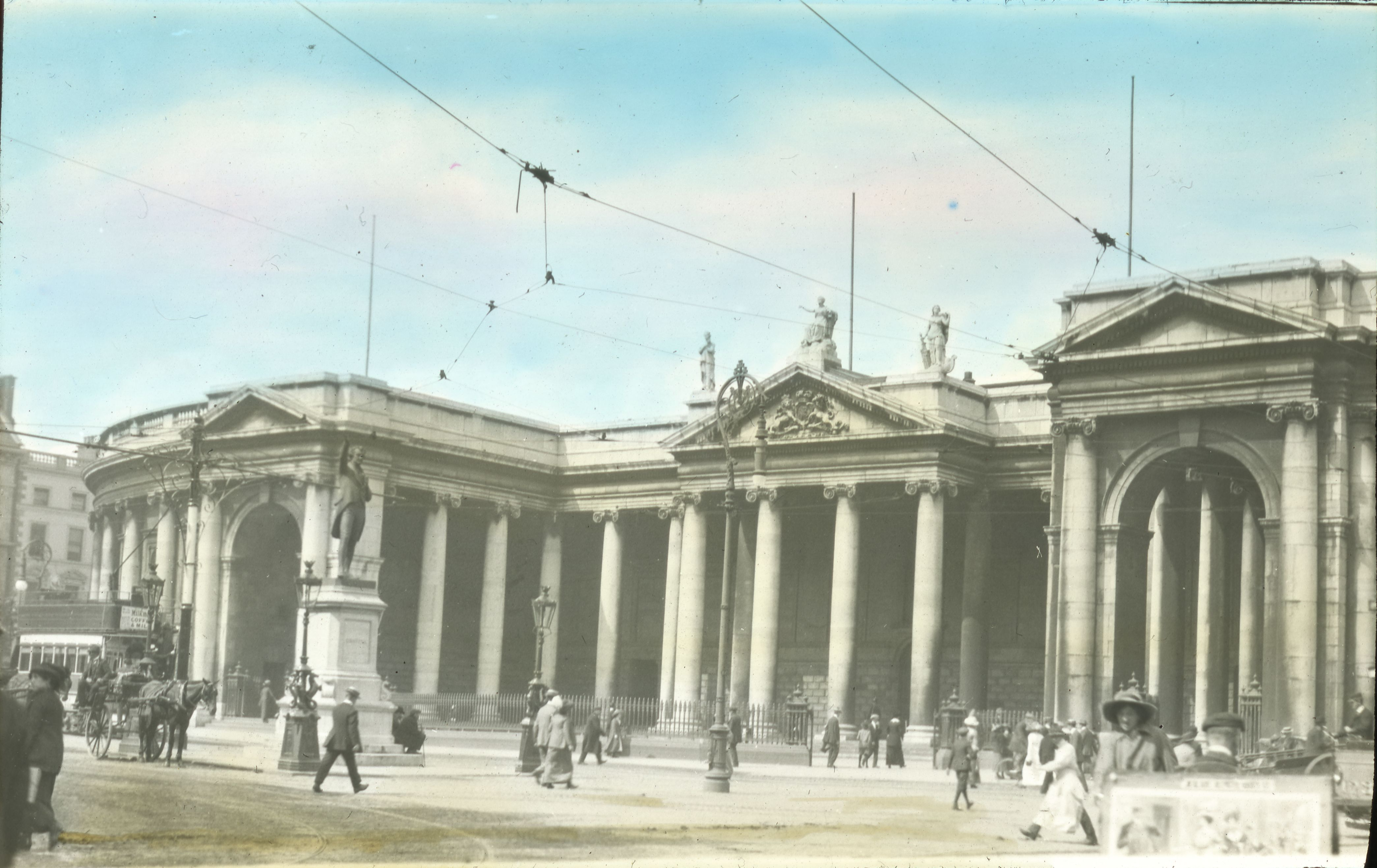
1913 image of the building from College Green

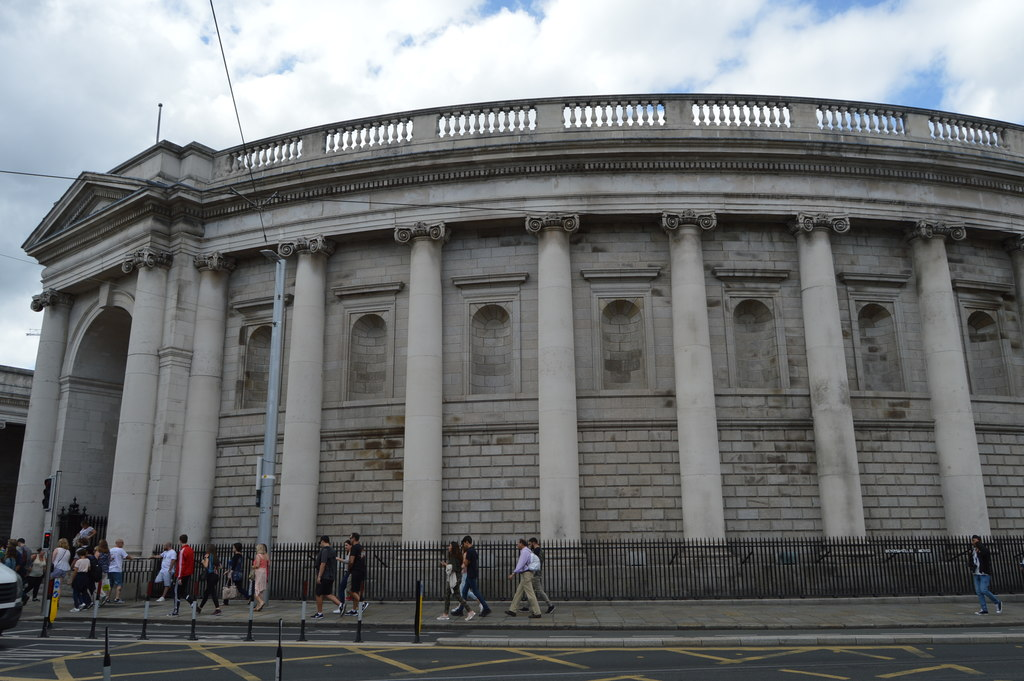
James Gandon designed curtain wall and niches connecting the front with the House of Lords entrance

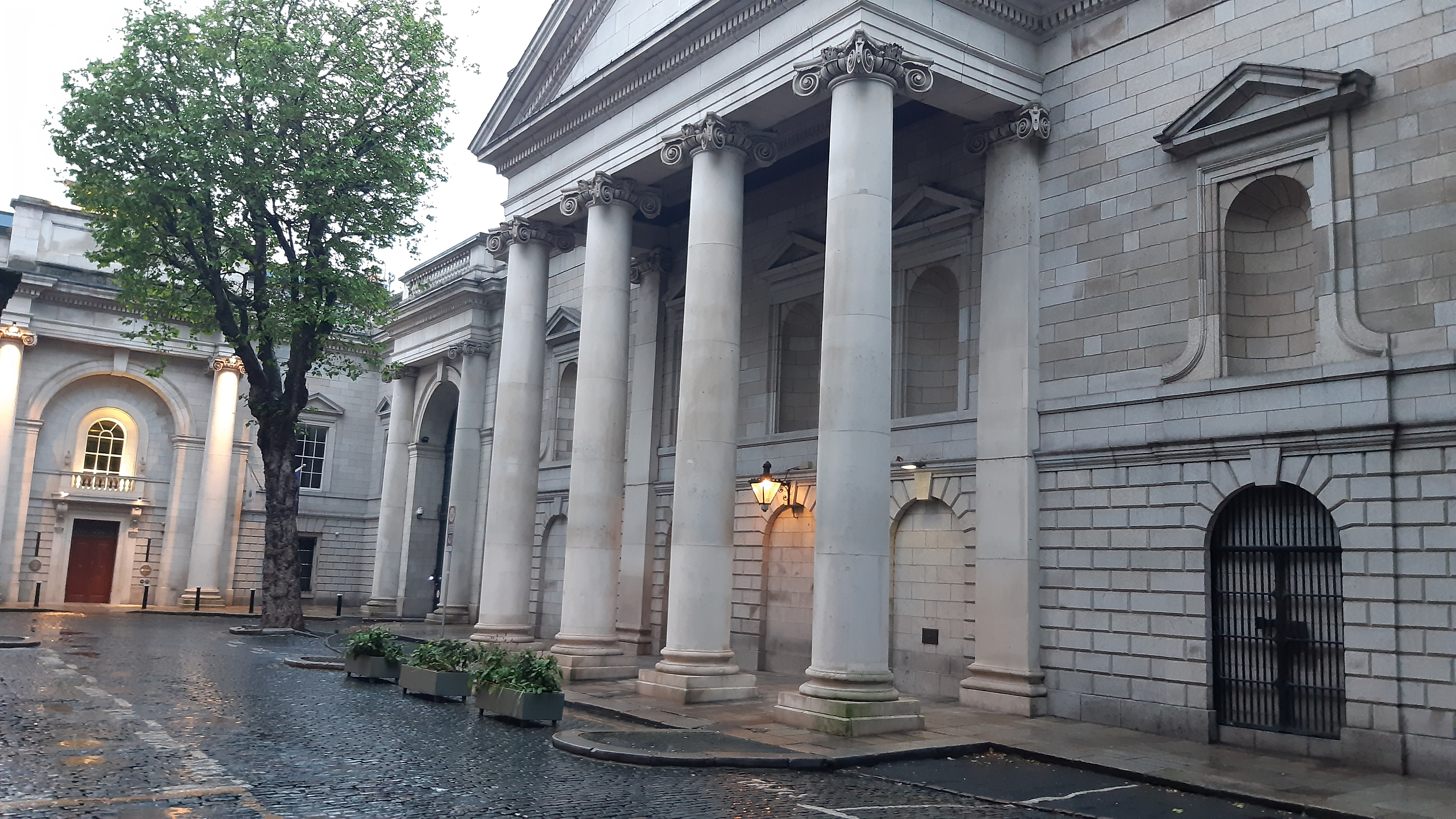
Foster Place entrance and portico in 2024. This entrance is also sometimes referred to as the House of Commons entrance.

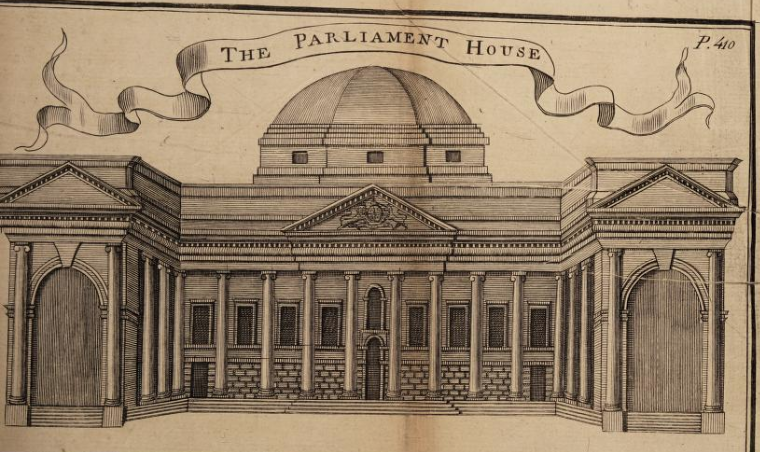
1766 illustration of the building with its original dome, the so-called 'goose pie'

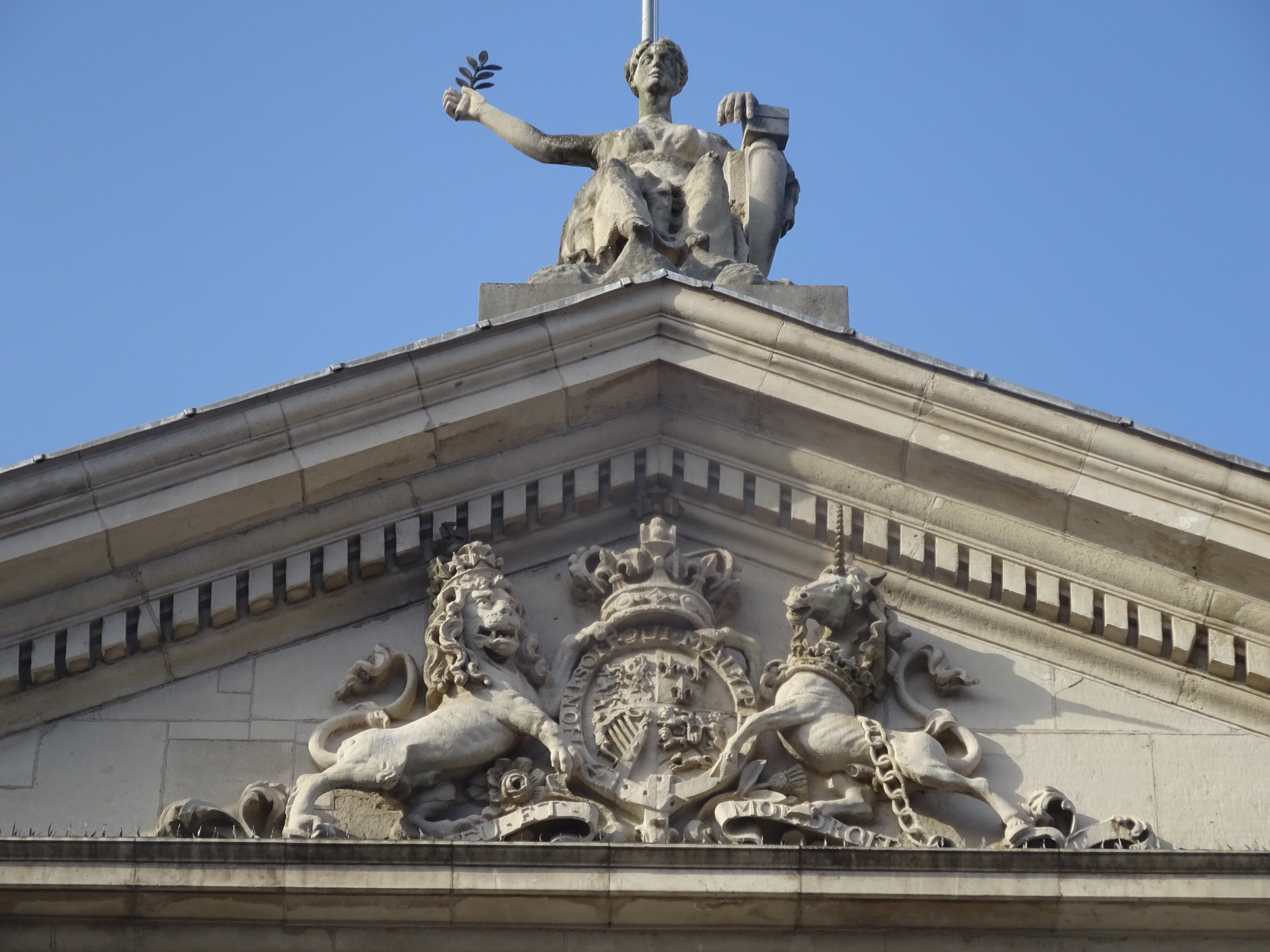
Detail of pediment

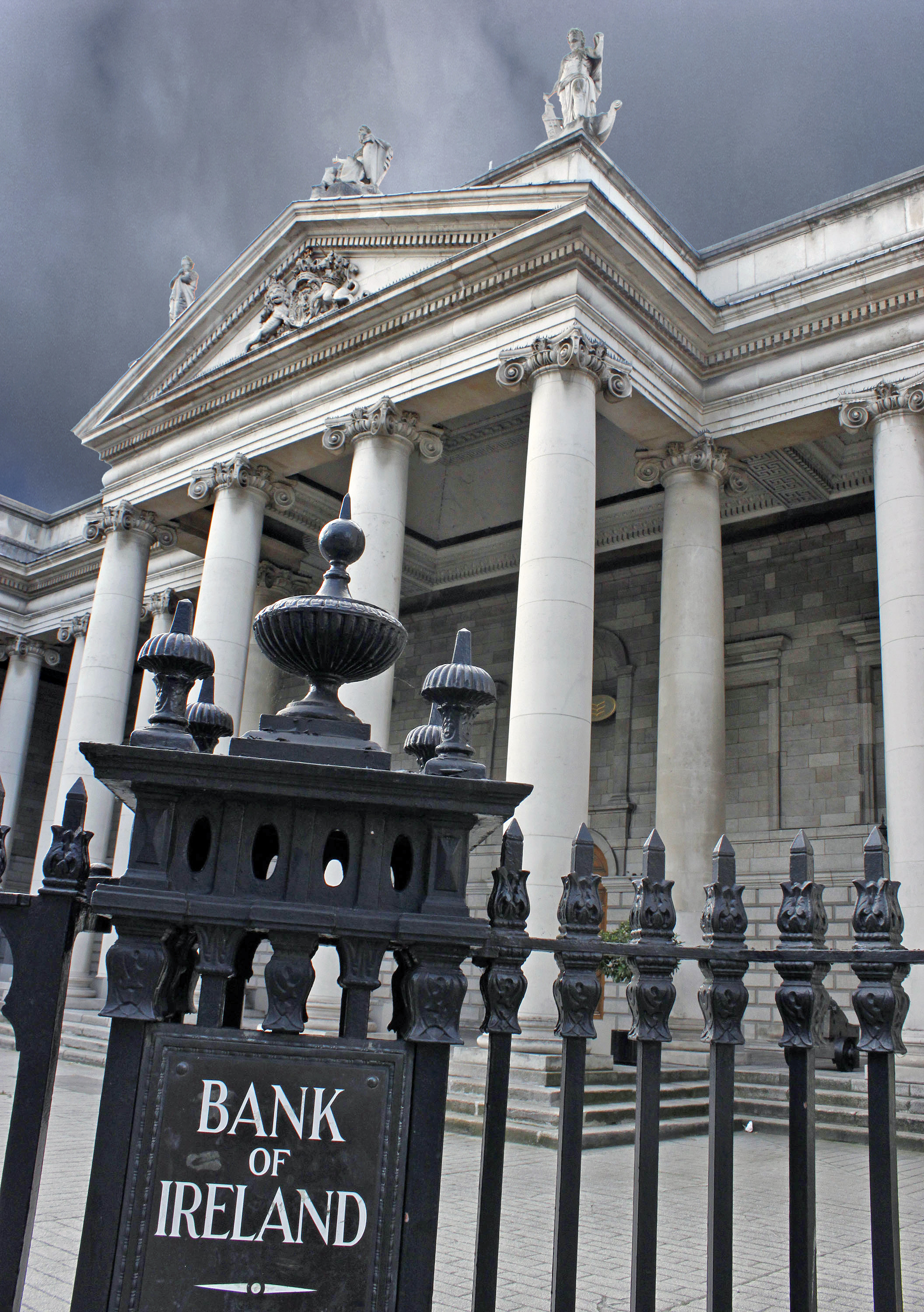
Detail of railings and front portico

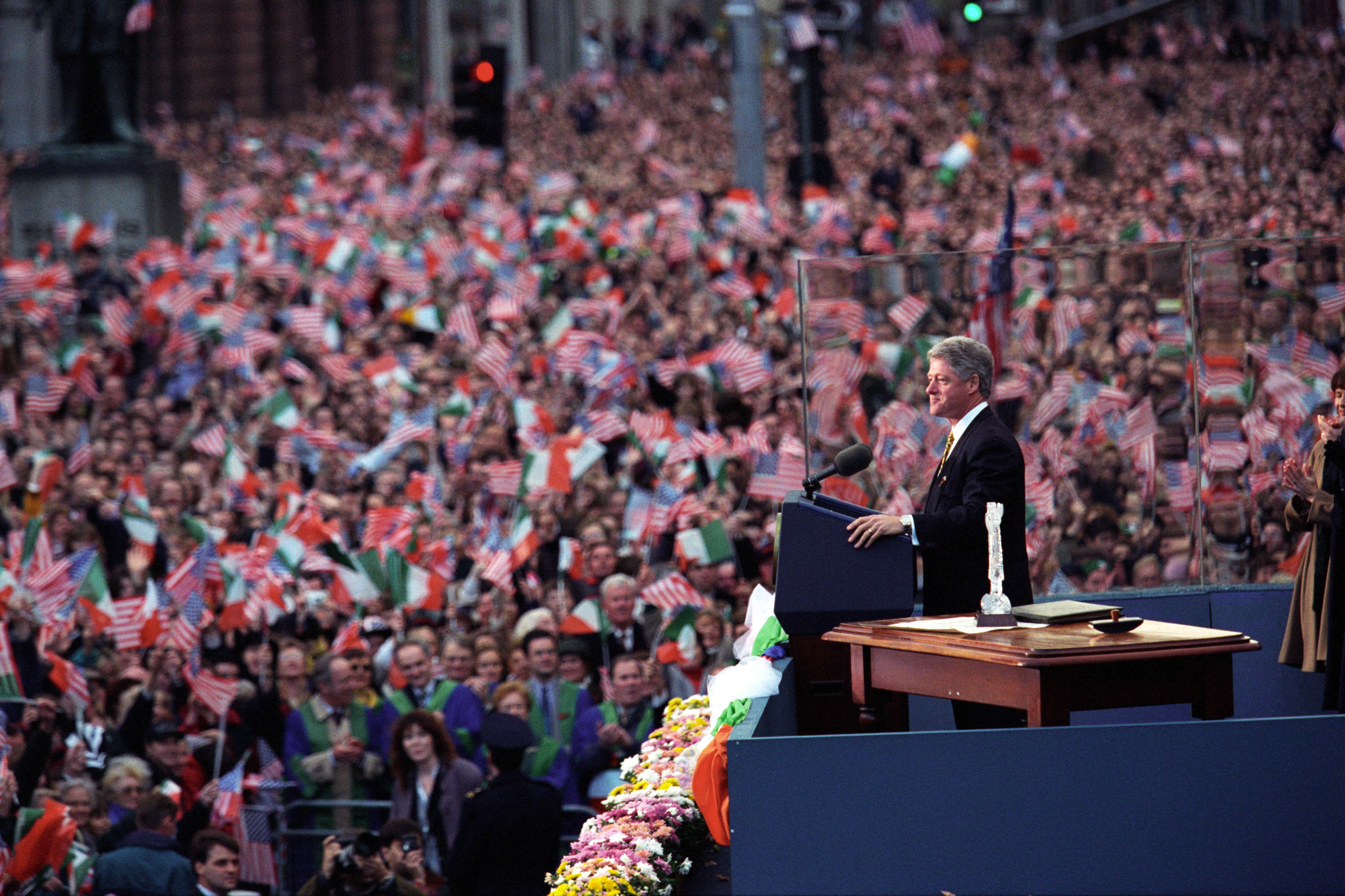
Bill Clinton addressing the crowd from the front of the building in 1995

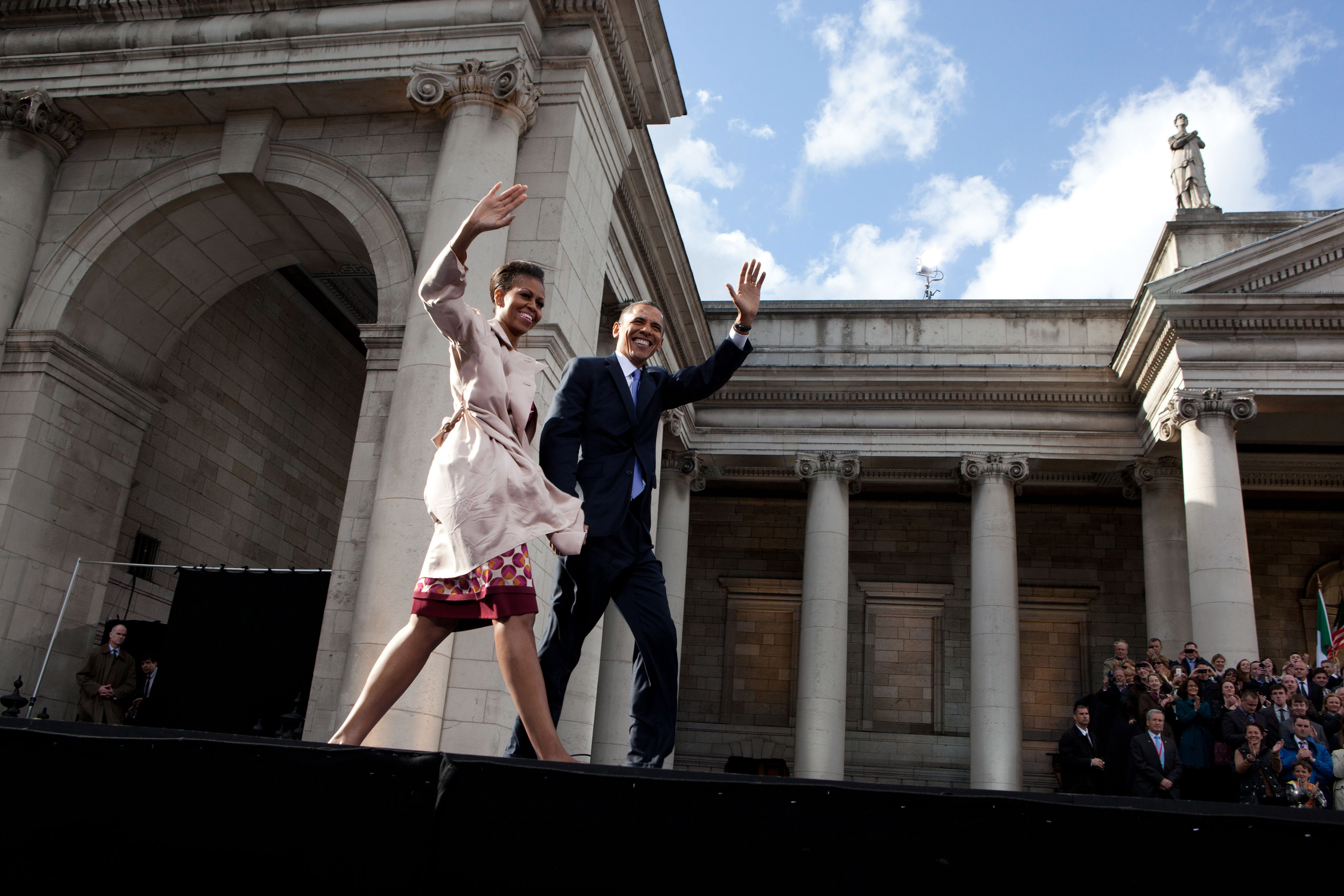
Michelle and Barack Obama in front of the College Green entrance

== See also ==
- Leinster House, the Republic of Ireland's current parliament house
- 18th-century Western domes
- Symbolism of domes

== Bibliography ==
- Baddeley, M. J. B. (1890). Thorough Guide Series. Ireland (Part I). Northern Counties including Dublin and Neighbourhood (Second Edition - Revised). London: Dulau & Co., 37, Soho Square, W.
- Casey, Christine (2005). Dublin: The City Within the Grand and Royal Canals and the Circular Road with the Phoenix Park. Yale University Press. ISBN 978-0-30010-923-8.
- Keatinge, Edgar F. (1 September 1947). "Colourful, Tuneful Dublin". Dublin Historical Record. 9 (3). Dublin: Old Dublin Society: 73–83. JSTOR 30084153.
- Maxwell, Constantia (1997). Dublin Under the Georges. Lambay Books. ISBN 0-7089-4497-3.
- Wyse Jackson, Patrick (1993). The Building Stones of Dublin: A Walking Guide. Donnybrook, Dublin: Town House and Country House. ISBN 0-946172-32-3.
- Wyse Jackson, Patrick N.; Caulfield, Louise M. (2023). Enriching Architecture: Craft and Its Conservation in Anglo-Irish Building Production, 1660–1760. Chapter 8: The rough and the smooth. Stone use in Dublin 1720–60. London: UCL Press. ISBN 978-1800083561.
- History of the Irish Parliament 1692–1800 by E.M. Johnston-Liik (Ulster Historical Foundation, 2002) ISBN 1-903688-09-4
- Volume 2 of "The Unreformed House of Commons" by Edward and Annie G. Porritt (Cambridge University Press, 1903)
