= James Gandon =

English architect (1743–1823)

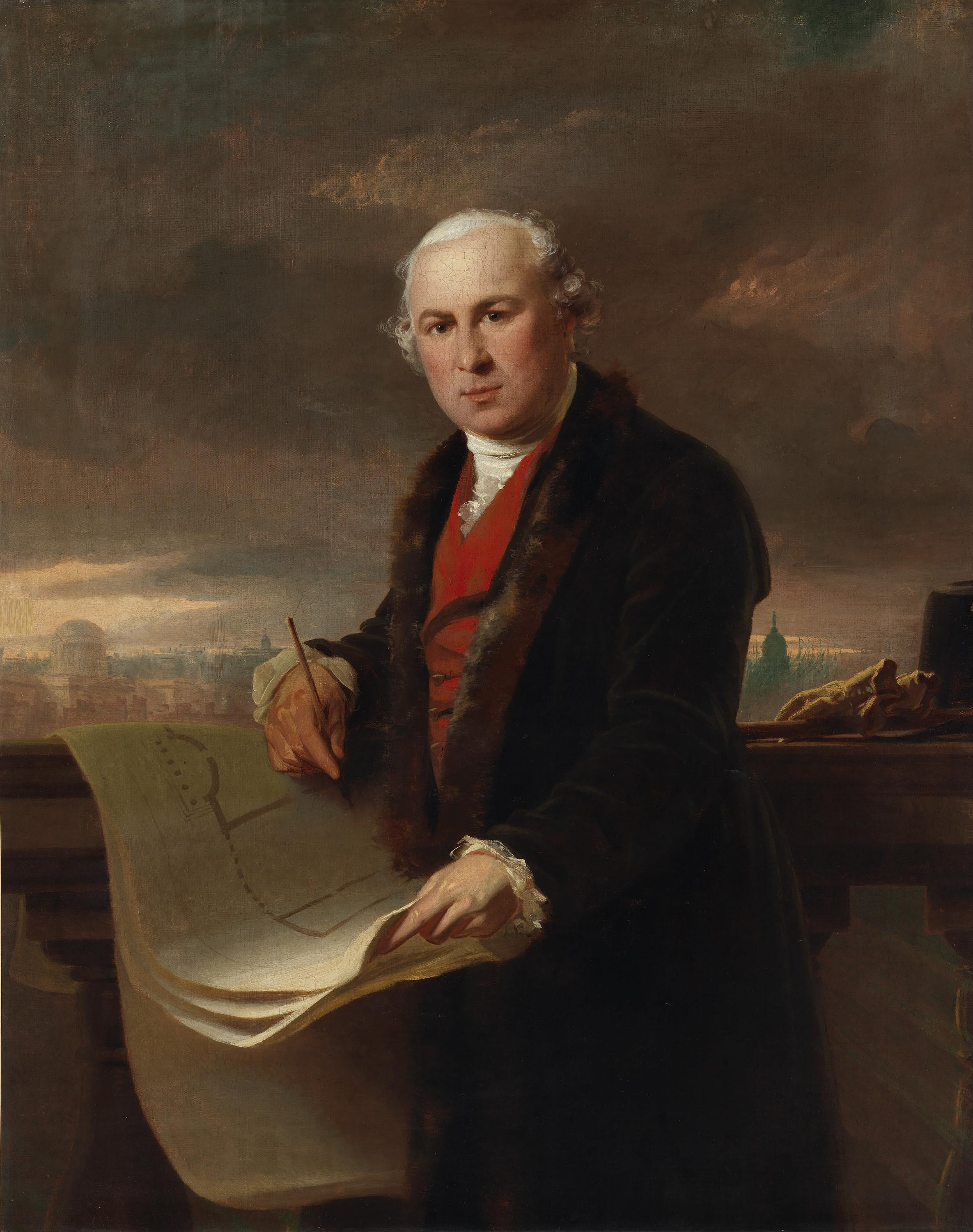
- Portrait by Tilly Kettle, c. 1783
- Born: 20 February 1743; New Bond Street, London
- Died: 24 December 1832 (aged 89); Lucan, Dublin
- Resting place: Drumcondra Church, Drumcondra
- Occupation: Architect
- Known for: Designing the Four Courts, the Custom House and King's Inns

James Gandon (20 February 1743 – 24 December 1823) was an English architect best known for his work in Ireland during the late 18th and early 19th centuries. His best known works include the Custom House, Beresford Place, Four Courts and King's Inns in Dublin and Emo Court in County Laois.

== Early life ==
Gandon was born on 20 February 1742 in New Bond Street, London, at the house of his grandfather Peter Gandon, a French Huguenot refugee. He was the only son of Peter Gandon (b. 1713), a gunmaker, and Jane Burchall (possibly née Wynne). From 1749 he was educated at Shipley's Drawing Academy where he studied the classics, mathematics, arts and architecture. On leaving the drawing academy he was articled to study architecture in the office of Sir William Chambers. Chambers was an advocate of the neoclassical evolution of Palladian architecture, although he later made designs in the Gothic Revival style. However, it was Chambers's palladian and neoclassical concepts which most influenced the young Gandon.

In 1765, Gandon left William Chambers to begin practice on his own. His first commission was on Sir Samuel Hellier's estate at the Wodehouse, near Wombourne. Gandon's new practice, whilst successful, always remained small. In about 1769 he entered an architectural competition to design the new Royal Exchange in Dublin. The plan eventually chosen was by Thomas Cooley. However, Gandon's design came second and brought him to the attention of the politicians who were overseeing the large-scale redevelopment of Dublin, one of the largest cities in Europe at the time.

During the following years in England, Gandon was responsible for the design of the County Hall in Nottingham. Between 1769 and 1771, he collaborated with John Woolfe on two additional volumes of Vitruvius Britannicus, a book of plans and drawings of Palladian revival buildings by such architects as Inigo Jones and Colen Campbell. During his English career he was awarded the gold medal for architecture by the Royal Academy, London in 1768.

In 1771 he was paid five guineas ″To making of a design of a Theater at Wynnstay″ He was also paid nine guineas for giving ″36 Lessons in Architecture″ to Sir Watkin Williams Wynn. The Theatre was converted from a huge kitchen which had been built for the stupendous Coming of Age Celebrations of Sir Watkin in that year and was used from 1771 until Sir Watkin died. The British Library has a drawing of the Theatre which was used for an admission ticket for a performance which belonged to King George III.

== Designing the Custom House ==
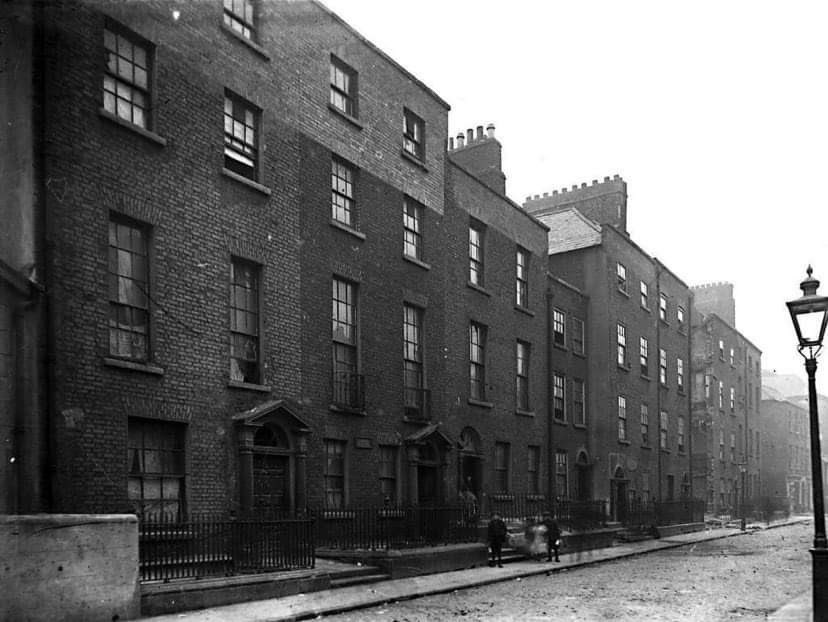
Gandon's home was located at 7 Mecklenburgh Street, 6th from left in this photo from 1913.

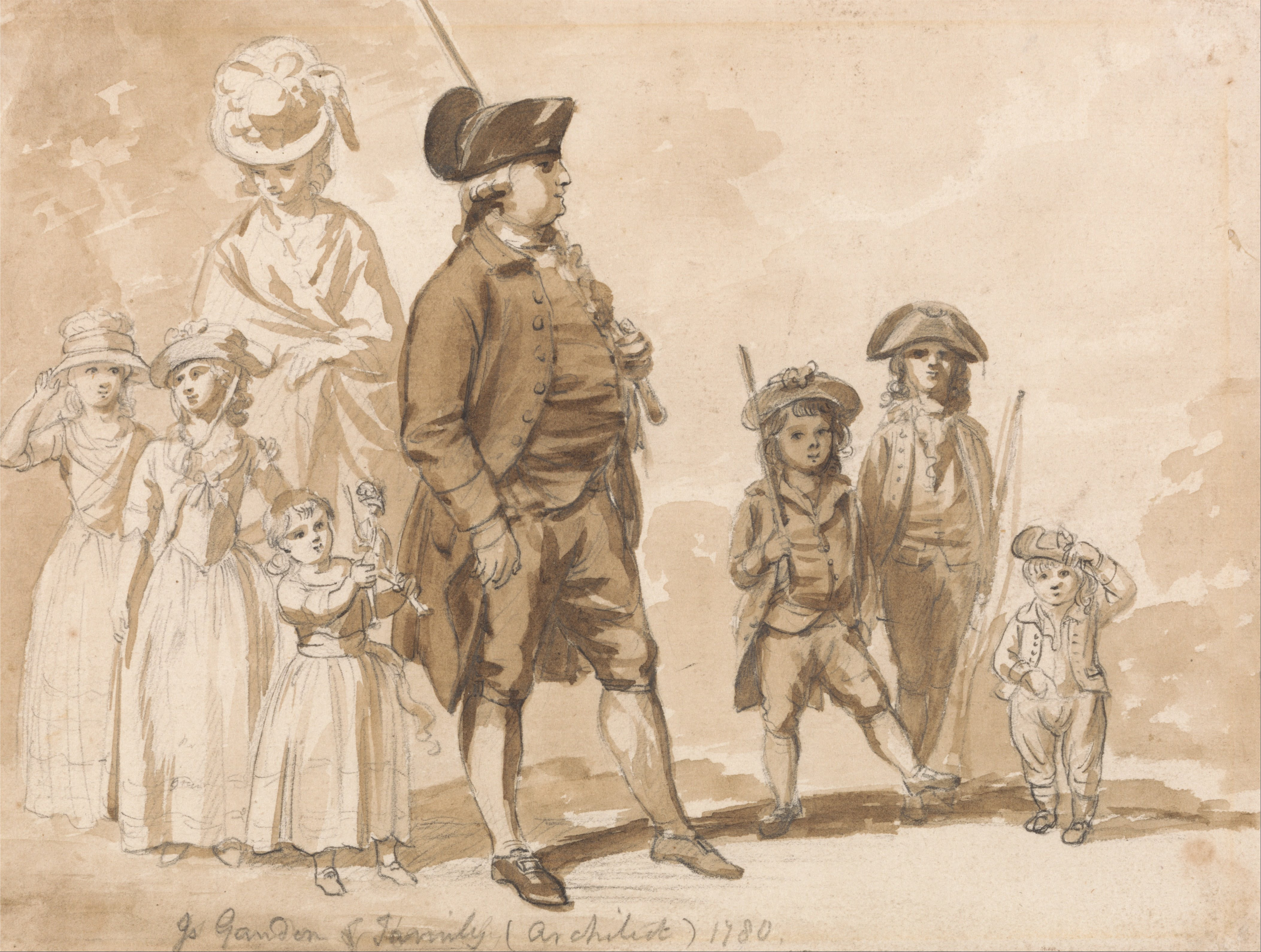
James Gandon and Family by Paul Sandby (1780).

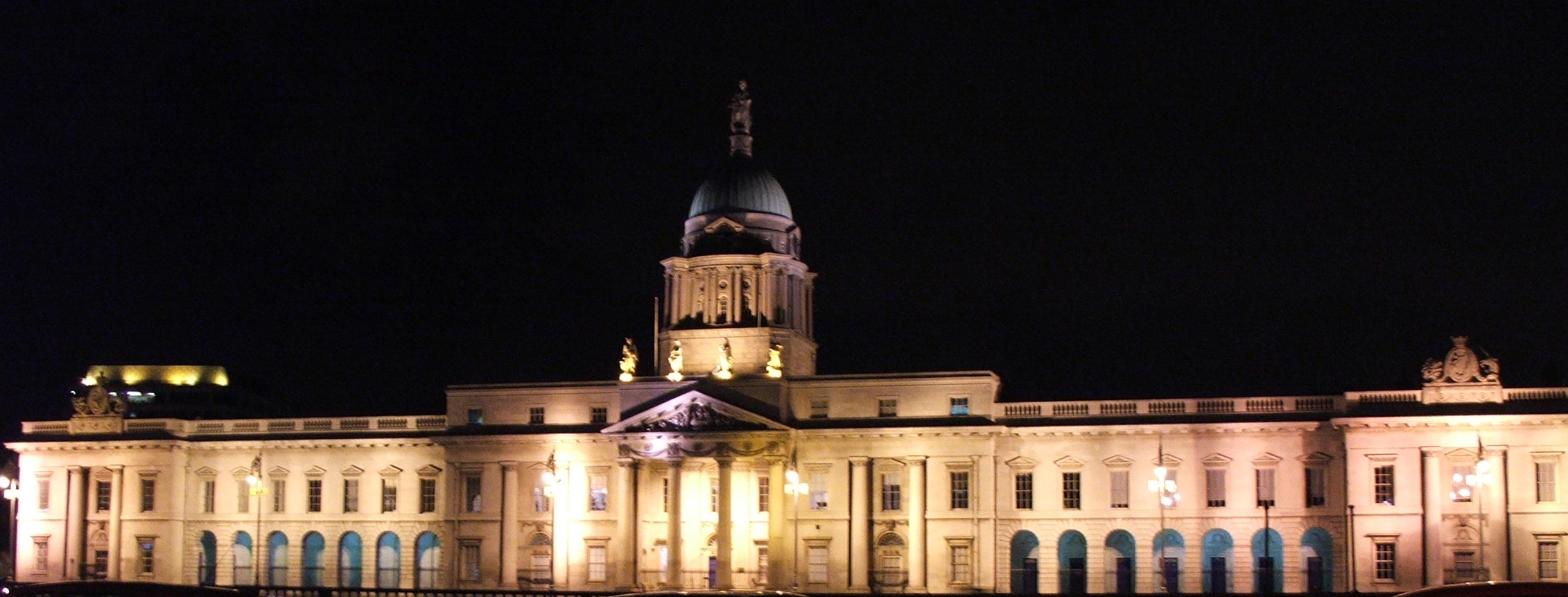
The south facade of the James Gandon Custom House by night

In 1780 Gandon declined an invitation from a member of the Romanov family to work in St. Petersburg but in 1781, at the age of 38, he accepted an invitation to Ireland from Lord Carlow and John Beresford (the Revenue Commissioner for Ireland) to supervise the construction of the new Custom House in Dublin. Thomas Cooley, the original architect on that project, had died and Gandon was chosen to assume complete control. Gandon employed the sculptor Edward Smyth to work on the Custom House and all of his Dublin buildings. The new Custom House was unpopular with Dublin Corporation and some city merchants who complained that it moved the axis of the city, would leave little room for shipping, and it was being built on what at the time was a swamp. It is said that the Irish people were so opposed to the Custom House and its associated taxes that Beresford had to smuggle Gandon into the country and keep him hidden in his own home for the first three months. The project was eventually completed at a cost of £200,000, an enormous sum at the time.

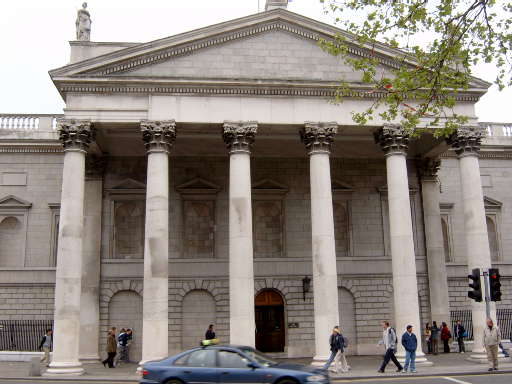
The 'House of Lord's Entrance' part of Gandon's extension to Edward Lovett Pearce's Irish Houses of Parliament. The great portico is flanked by a curved screen wall

This conspicuous commission proved to be the turning point in Gandon's career and Dublin was to become Gandon's home and its architecture his "raison d'etre" for the remainder of his life. He took a house in Mecklenburgh Street (now Railway Street), that he might be near the residence of John Beresford at Tyrone House, the main proponent for the development of the city. The city, which in Gandon's lifetime was to grow to become the fifth largest city in Europe, was undergoing vast expansion, mostly following the Palladian and neoclassical designs already popularised in the city by Edward Lovett Pearce and Richard Cassels.

The newly formed Wide Streets Commission employed Gandon to design a new aristocratic enclave in the vicinity of Mountjoy Square and Gardiner Street. The new classical terraces of large residences became the Town houses of members of the newly built and imposing Irish Houses of Parliament situated in College Green south of the river. Gandon also designed Carlisle Bridge (now O'Connell Bridge) over the River Liffey to join the north and south areas of the city.

== Other Irish works ==
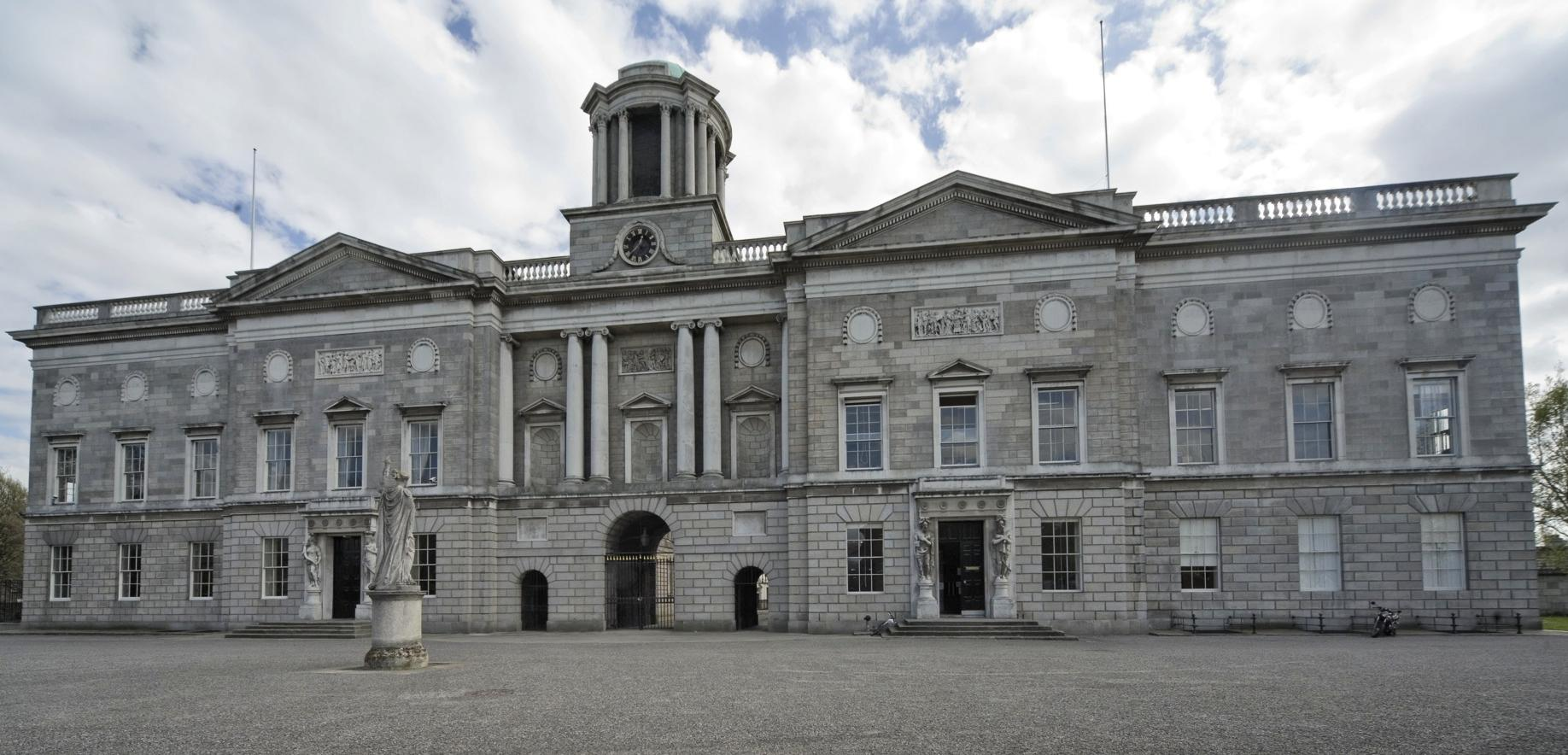
The King's Inn, Dublin, 1800–1808, later completed by Francis Johnston

Gandon's other works in the city included:

- The Four Courts of 1786,
- The centre portion of King's Inns Henrietta Street begun in 1795 and completed in 1816 by his pupil Henry Aaron Baker,
- The improvement of the Rotunda Assembly rooms 1786.

Gandon's least well known building in Dublin is his Royal Military Infirmary of 1787 on Infirmary Road. He worked for the Wide Street Commissioners and designed the facades for the shops at ground floor of D'Olier Street, Burgh Quay and some surrounding streets. One of his most prestigious commissions, which came in 1785, was to extend Pearce's monumental Houses of Parliament, for which he built the (well known today) curved screen wall which links his new corinthian portico for the House of Lords facing College Street to Pearce's original building. This building is now the Bank of Ireland.

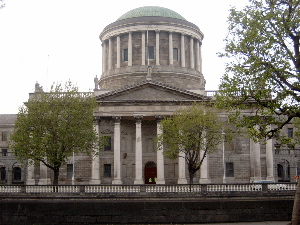
The Four Courts by James Gandon

His work in Ireland was not confined to Dublin, nor to civic and municipal commissions. In 1784 he designed the new courthouse and Gaol in Broad Street (Demolished) in Waterford; and he also worked on many private houses, including Abbeville, Dublin which he designed for John Beresford in 1792, Emsworth, Malahide, County Dublin in 1794 for James Woodmason, a London stationer who became involved in banking in Dublin, and Sandymount or Roslyn Park for the painter William Ashford. In County Laois, he designed Emo Court, County Laois in 1790–96 for the Earl of Portarlington, and also Coolbanagher Church of Ireland Church just outside Emo village.

His town planning work included creating a new setting for the Custom House with a curved terrace of townhouses at Beresford Place, Dublin, and the New Geneva town in County Waterford which was never completed. He designed a number of buildings including walled gardens, and farm buildings at Carriglass just outside Longford Town.

== Criticism and decline ==
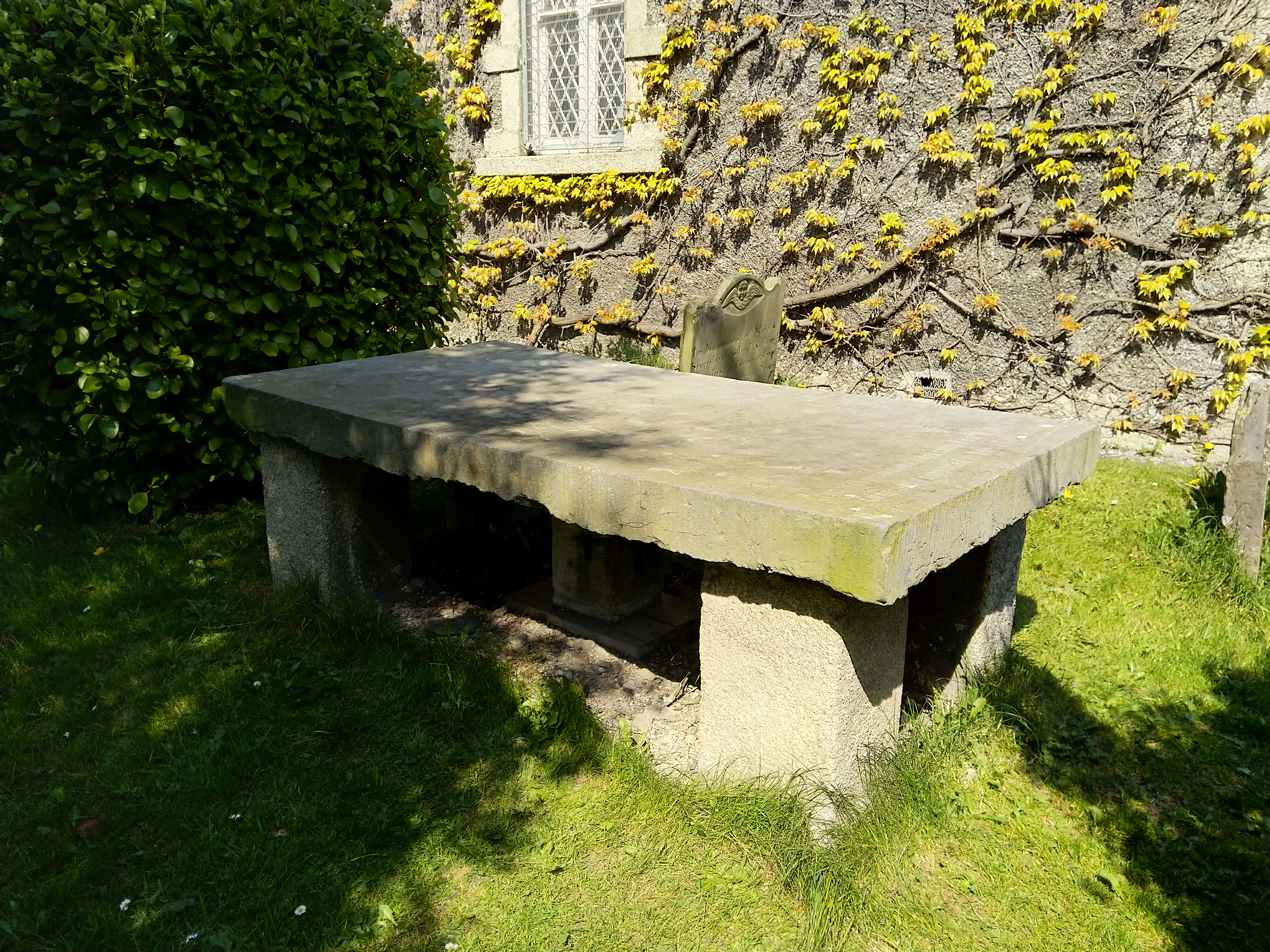
Grave of Francis Grose and Gandon

The success of Gandon's designs and commissions were however not reflected in personal popularity: he attracted huge criticism from his enemies. So hated was the taxation symbolised by the Custom House that the stigma of being its creator was to taint the appreciation of his work throughout his lifetime. It was even claimed that Gandon was designing buildings to boost his self-esteem. In the 1780s, during the construction of the Four Courts, one broadsheet published daily letters from a correspondent castigating and insulting Gandon and his designs. This further fostered the hate directed against him. In truth Gandon had merely rediscovered what architects from Vitruvius to Thomas Jefferson believed, which was that the Palladian form was eminently suitable for the design of public buildings where huge civic prestige was required.

In 1798, revolution broke out on the streets of Ireland and Gandon, an unpopular figure, hurriedly fled to London. On returning to Dublin he found a much changed city. The Irish Houses of Parliament, which had inspired the great period of development, were closed. The 1801 Act of Union had placed Ireland directly under rule from London. One by one the Anglo-Irish aristocracy left their fine new town houses in the city. As a direct result Dublin declined from being one of the great cities of Europe.

Gandon had married Eleanor Smullen on 26 July 1770. They had five children, four daughters and a son, James. Some sources state he was widowed shortly after his invitation to Dublin, but others state there is evidence of his wife in Dublin for a short time. Gandon died on 24 December 1823 at his home in Lucan, Dublin, having spent forty-two years in the city. He was buried in the church-yard of Drumcondra Church, in the same grave as his friend the antiquary Francis Grose. It seems that already by the time of his death his reputation was undergoing a re-evaluation, for his tomb-stone reads: – "Such was the respect in which Gandon was held by his neighbours and friends from around his home in Lucan that they refused carriages and walked the 16 miles to and from Drumcondra on the day of his funeral."

In the years since his death, Ireland's troubled history has resulted in destruction and damage to much of Gandon's work, especially his interiors. The Custom House was burnt down in 1921 by the IRA during the War of Independence and parts of it were rebuilt using a darker shade of native limestone. The Four Courts was shelled by government forces during the Civil War in 1922 and partly destroyed by a huge explosion. Even though it was later rebuilt, much of Gandon's original work is gone and the interior can today only be appreciated from his original drawings. The wings to the Four Courts were shortened by one bay, in order to widen the roadway, and to permit more lanes of traffic. This alteration seriously damages the original composition. Yet despite this, the stamp of his work is still clearly visible in Georgian Dublin today.
