= Spire of Lloyd =

Tower in Ireland

Coordinates: 53.73300°N 6.90553°W

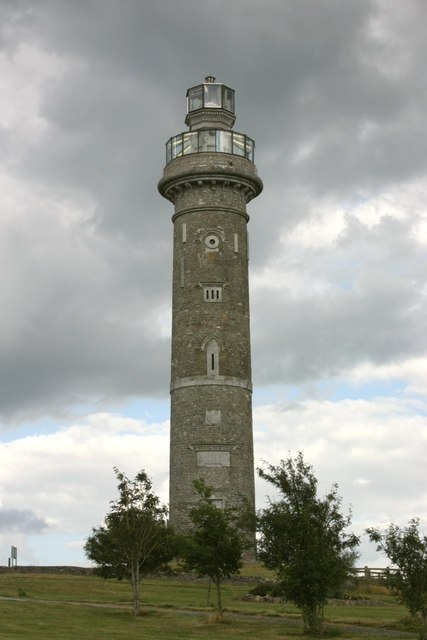
Spire of Lloyd built 1791

The Spire of Lloyd in Kells, Ireland is an 18th-century folly in the form of a Doric column, surmounted by a glazed lantern. Sometimes described as "Ireland's only inland lighthouse", it was designed by architect Henry Aaron Baker. It was reputedly commissioned by Thomas Taylour, 1st Earl of Bective as a memorial to his father.

The tower is located on the Hill of Lloyd, making this 40 kilometres (25 mi) from the coast and is around 30 metres (98 ft) high. From the top there are views of the surrounding countryside as far as the Mourne Mountains in County Down, Northern Ireland on a clear day. The tower was used to view horse racing and the hunt in the nineteenth century. A plaque on the tower reads:

This pillar was designed by Henry Aaron Baker Esq. architect was executed by Mr. Joseph Beck stone cutter Mr. Owen Mc Cabe head mason Mr. Bartle Reilly overseer Anno 1791.

The area around the tower has been developed as a community park, and includes a paupers' grave, where Mass is still celebrated annually in memory of the Great Famine.
