= Henry A. Baker =

Irish architect (1753–1836)

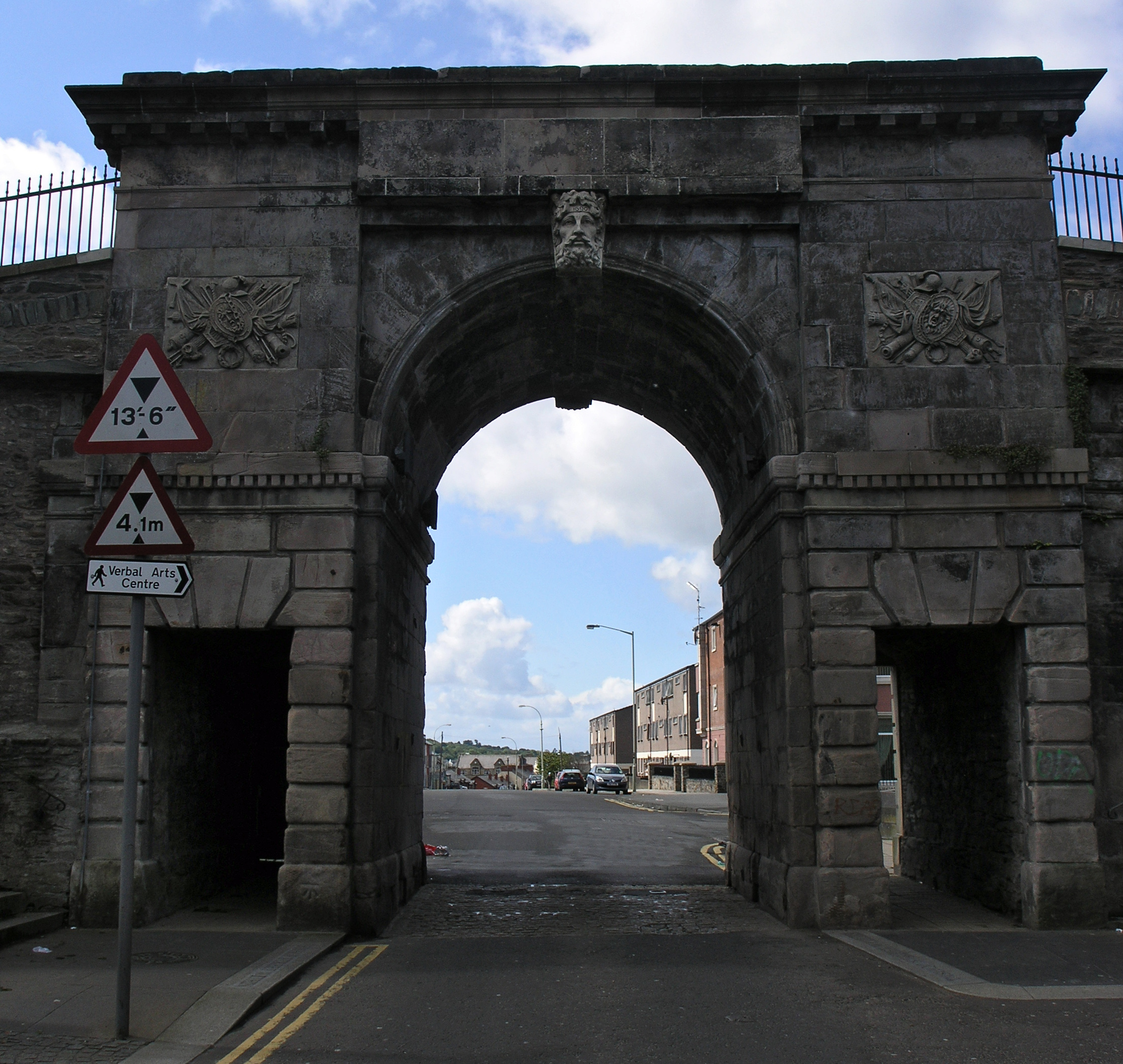
Bishops Street Gate, Derry, c.1789

Henry Aaron Baker (1753–1836), was a prominent Irish architect renowned for his contributions to Irish neoclassical architecture.

From 1777 to 1779, Baker was a studied at the Dublin Society's School of Architectural Drawing under Thomas Ivory. Following Ivory's death, Baker was a pupil of James Gandon, 'and acted as clerk of the works to the buildings designed and chiefly constructed by his master for the Inns of Court, then called the King's Inns, at Dublin'. He was a member of, and for some time secretary to, the Royal Hibernian Academy. In 1787 he was appointed teacher of architecture in the Dublin Society's school, and retained the post till his death. In 1789, he erected the triumphal arch known as Bishop's Gate at Derry, and in 1791, the Spire of Lloyd in Kells, County Meath. In 1802-04, he gained the first prize for a design for converting the Irish parliament house into a bank. The superintendence of that work was given, however, to another architect, Francis Johnston. He died on 7 June 1836.

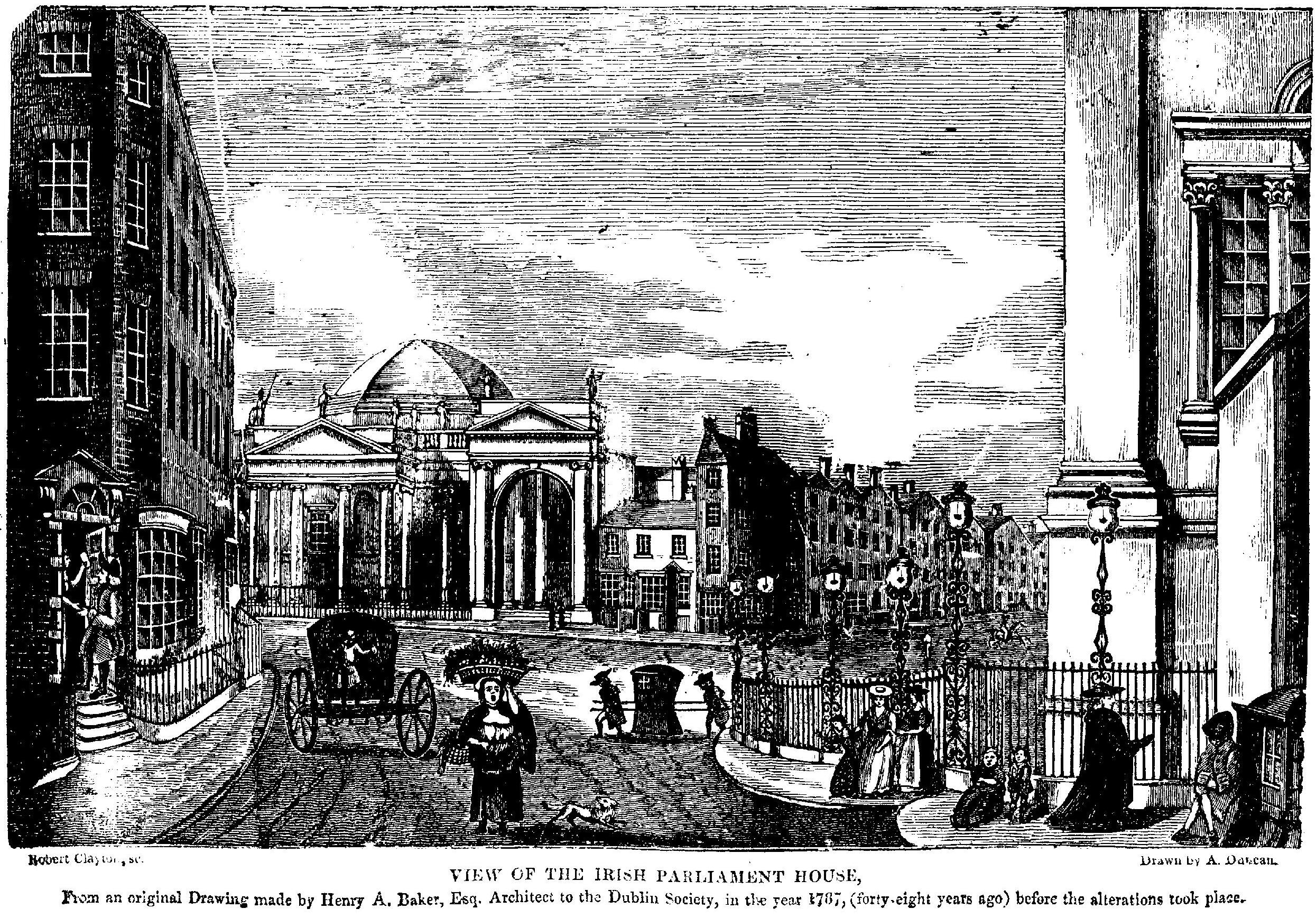
An engraving, after a sketch by Baker in 1787, Dublin Penny Journal (1835)
