= The Belvedere Hotel (Dublin) =

Hotel in Dublin, Ireland

- Location within Central Dublin
- Hotel chain: Maldron Hotels

General information
- Classification: 3 stars
- Location: Great Denmark Street, D01 W1C0, Dublin
- Coordinates: 53.3550°N 6.26241°W
- Current tenants: Dalata Hotel Group (under management agreement)
- Owner: Donie Cassidy

Technical details
- Floor count: 5

Other information
- Number of rooms: 103
- Number of restaurants: 1
- Parking: Parking available

Website
- www.belvederehoteldublin.com

The Belvedere Hotel is a hotel located on Great Denmark Street in Dublin, Ireland. It operates primarily in three Georgian red-brick houses built in the 1770s, at 1-3 North Great George's Street, while the remainder of the property to the rear was constructed in the mid 2000s.

Number 1 has served as the Belvedere hotel since around 1900.

The hotel takes its name from nearby Belvedere House.

The hotel is owned by former Fianna Fáil TD Donie Cassidy and is currently managed under an operating agreement by Dalata Hotel Group, who market it under the "Maldron" brand, and as of 2024, it was rated as a 3-star hotel.

== Barry's Hotel ==
In December 2021, Cassidy acquired Barry's hotel immediately opposite the Belvedere hotel for €8m and in 2018 acquired a building immediately adjacent which was initially named Hotel 7. As of 2024, the buildings have been connected and form part of the same hotel with 90 bedrooms.
