= Temple Street, Dublin =

Street in Dublin, Ireland

Temple Street
- Temple Street North
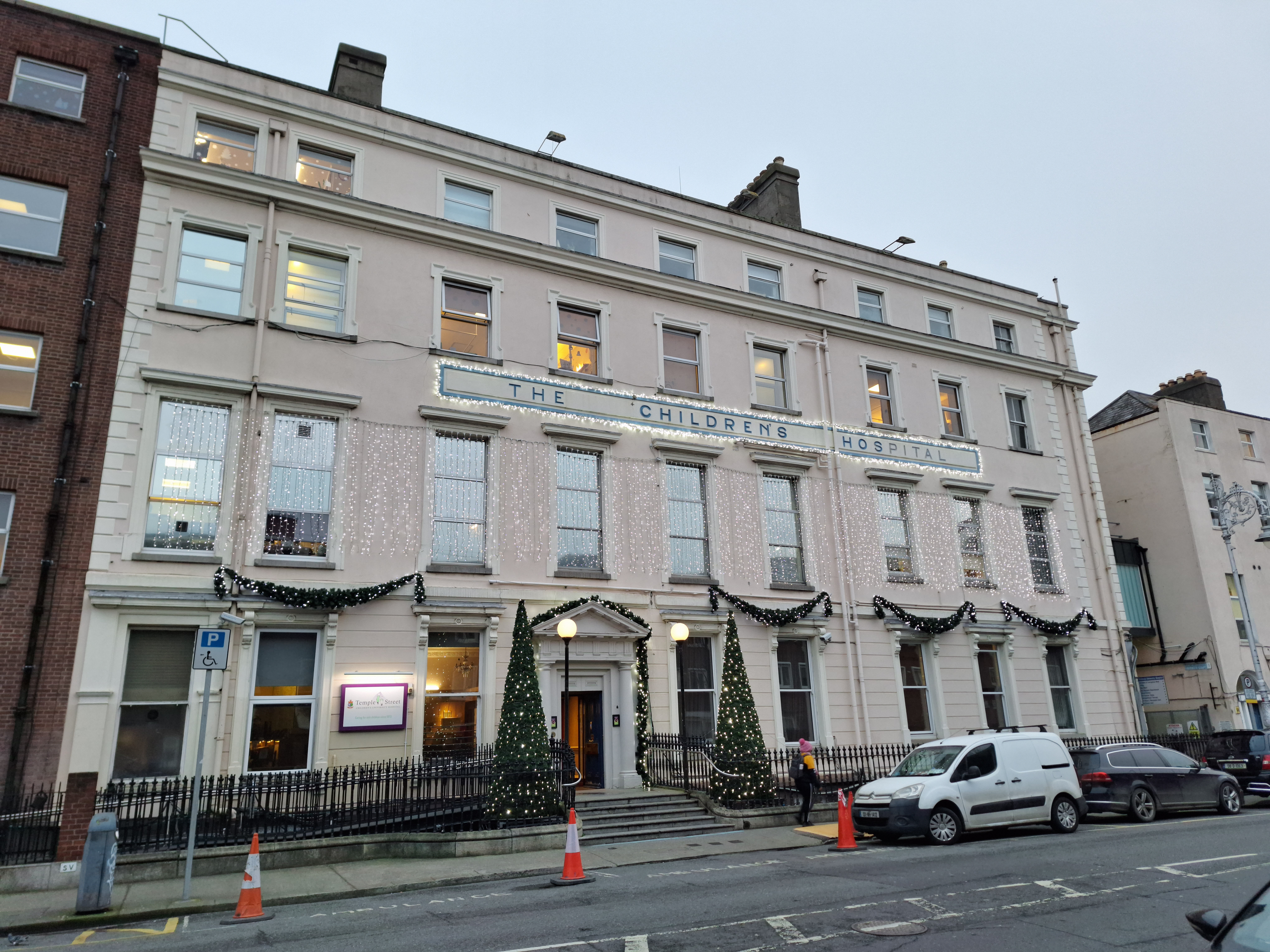
- The front facade of Temple Street Children's Hospital
- Interactive map of Temple Street
- Native name: Sráid Temple (Irish)
- Namesake: George Nugent-Temple-Grenville, 3rd Earl Temple
- Postal code: D01
- Coordinates: 53.356059°N 6.261296°W
- south end: Parnell Street
- Major junctions: Great Denmark Street; Gardiner Place
- north end: Hardwicke Place

Construction
- Construction start: 1770s

Other
- Designer: Luke Gardiner, 1st Viscount Mountjoy
- Known for: Temple Street Children's Hospital; Georgian architecture Belvedere College

Temple Street (Irish: Sráid Temple) is a Georgian street in Dublin, Ireland laid out from the 1770s by Luke Gardiner, 1st Viscount Mountjoy.

The street is dominated by the spire of Francis Johnston's St. George's Church which terminates a vista down Hardwicke Street, Temple Street and Eccles Street at their confluence with the church at Hardwicke Place (formerly named Temple Crescent).

Temple Street is split into Temple Street Upper and Temple Street Lower. Temple Street Lower is more commonly referred to as Hill Street owing to its topography and its name was officially changed in 1887 by Dublin Corporation following a petition by the residents of Temple Street owing to the lower section of the street becoming an area of ill repute.

The street connects with Parnell Street at its southern end and joins the crescent of Hardwicke Place at its northern end where it extends across Dorset Street to join Eccles Street. The street is sometimes referred to as Temple Street North to differentiate it from Temple Lane in Temple Bar and Temple Street West in Dublin 7.

== History ==
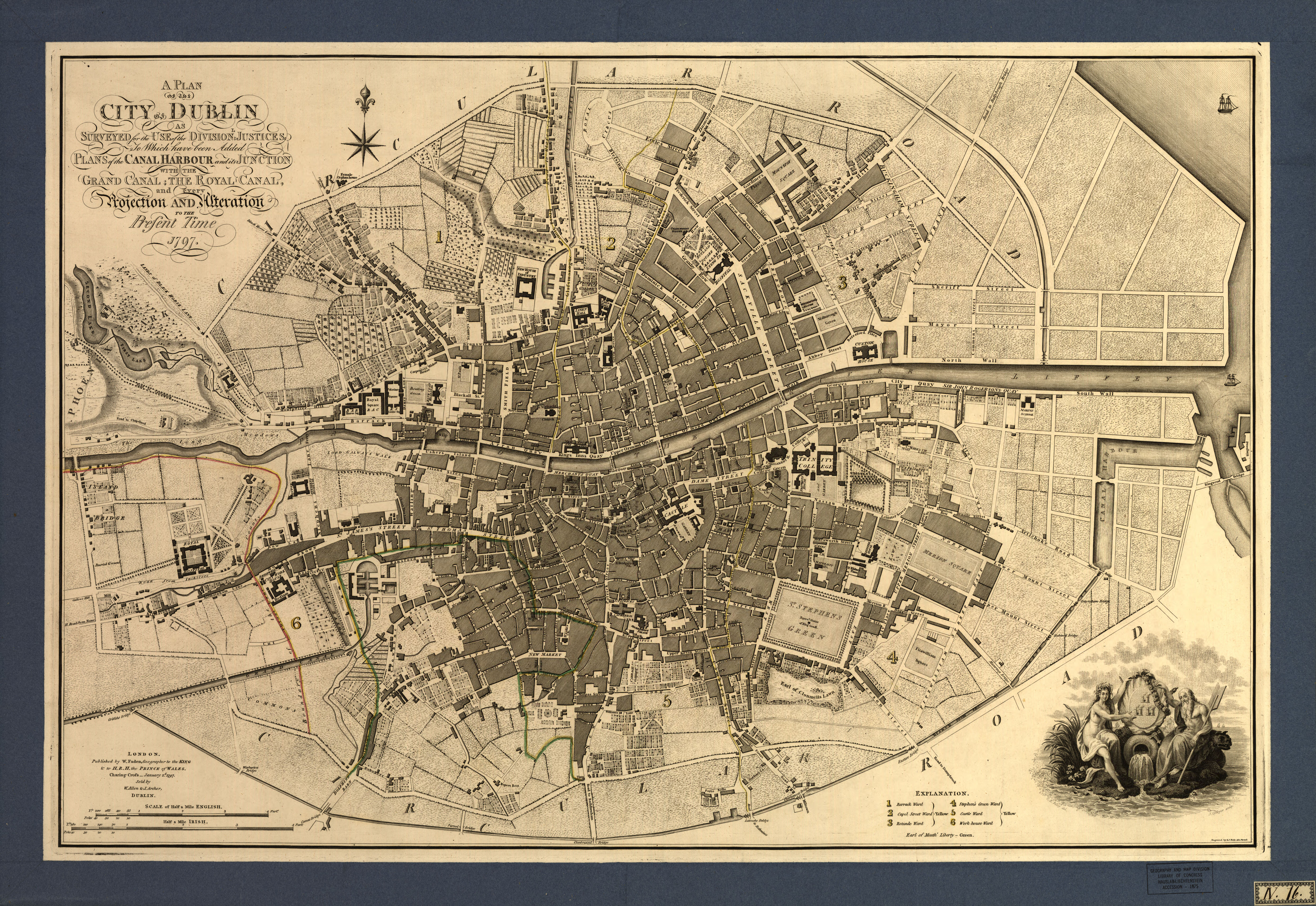
A 1797 map of Dublin showing the lower section of the street laid out with the street notably narrower at this point.

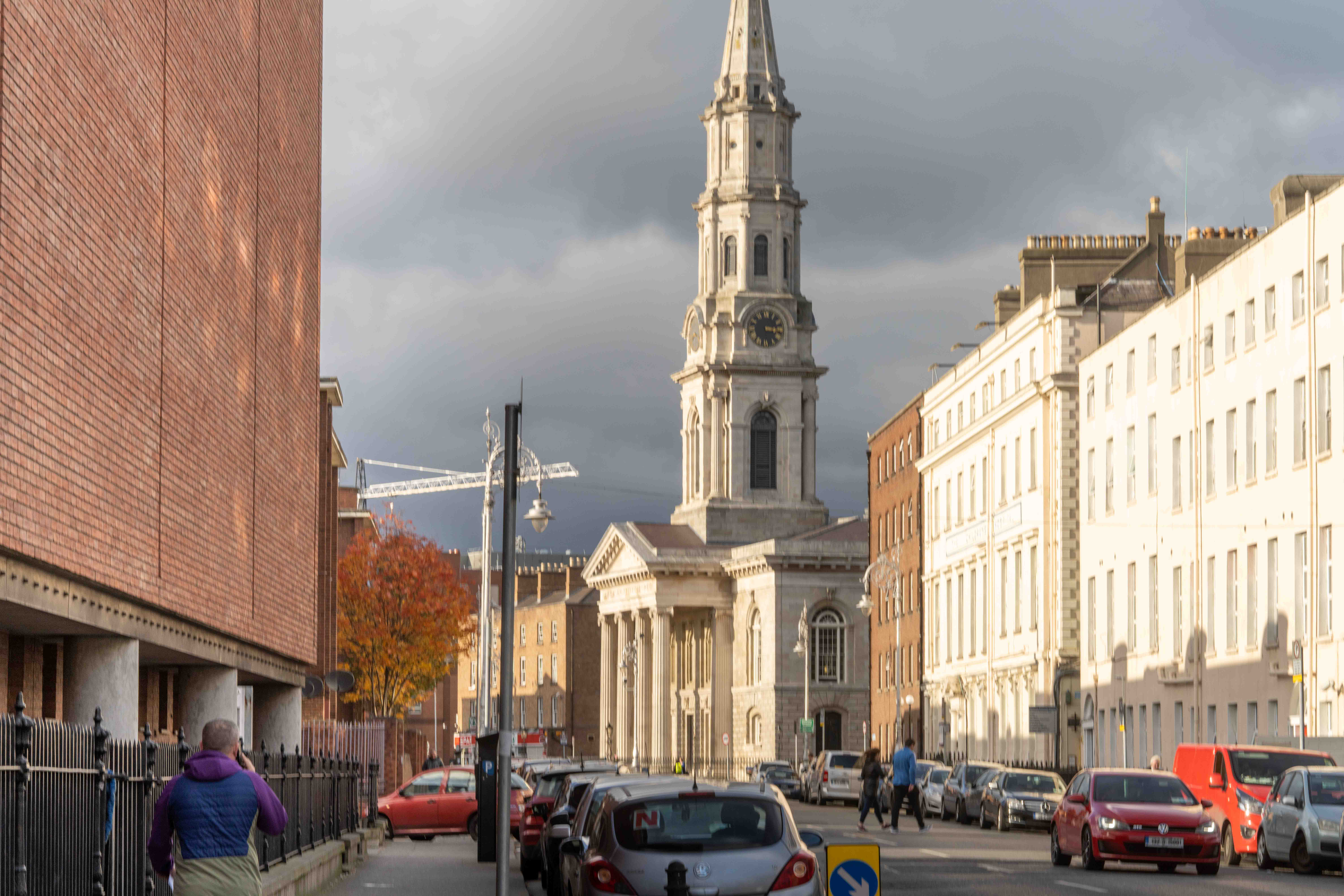
A view towards St. George's Church with the O'Reilly Theatre (left).

The street is named for George Nugent-Temple-Grenville, 1st Marquess of Buckingham who was Lord Lieutenant of Ireland from 1782–89 around the time of the street's formal development. Buckingham Street, Grenville Street and Temple Lane North were also named for him around the same time. Prior to this point, the street appears to have been referred to as an extension of Gardiner Place.

Prior to the street's formal laying out, only a laneway to the Old Church of St George appears on John Rocque's map of 1756. It had originally been constructed around 1714 by John Eccles and became a parish in 1793.

What is now Hill Street first started appearing on maps as Temple Street in the 1790s. Wilson's map of Dublin of 1798 only shows the street extending as far as the present day Hardwicke Street before its extension to Dorset Street.

St. George's Church was constructed on the street from 1802-14.

The lower section of the street acted as a stable lane for North Great George's Street and later contained mews houses.

Private baths were located on the street in different locations for much of the 19th century which were established by the physician Arthur Clarke and his wife Olivia Owenson, Lady Clarke. On 7 February 1859, Victorian Turkish baths named the Crescent Baths opened at 18-19 Temple Street Lower in what were the former mews houses of North Great George's Street. A laneway leading off the street is still named Bath lane, a reference to the former baths.

Temple Street Children's Hospital first opened on the street in 1879 at 15 Temple Street in a home donated by the Earl of Bellomont, having earlier been established on nearby Buckingham Street.

=== Notable residents ===
The street has had a number of notable residents including;

- Number 14 - Cornelius O'Callaghan, 1st Baron Lismore and later Charles Stuart Parnell
- Number 15 - Earl of Bellomont
- Number 16 - John Ball
