= Eccles Street =

Street in central Dublin, Ireland

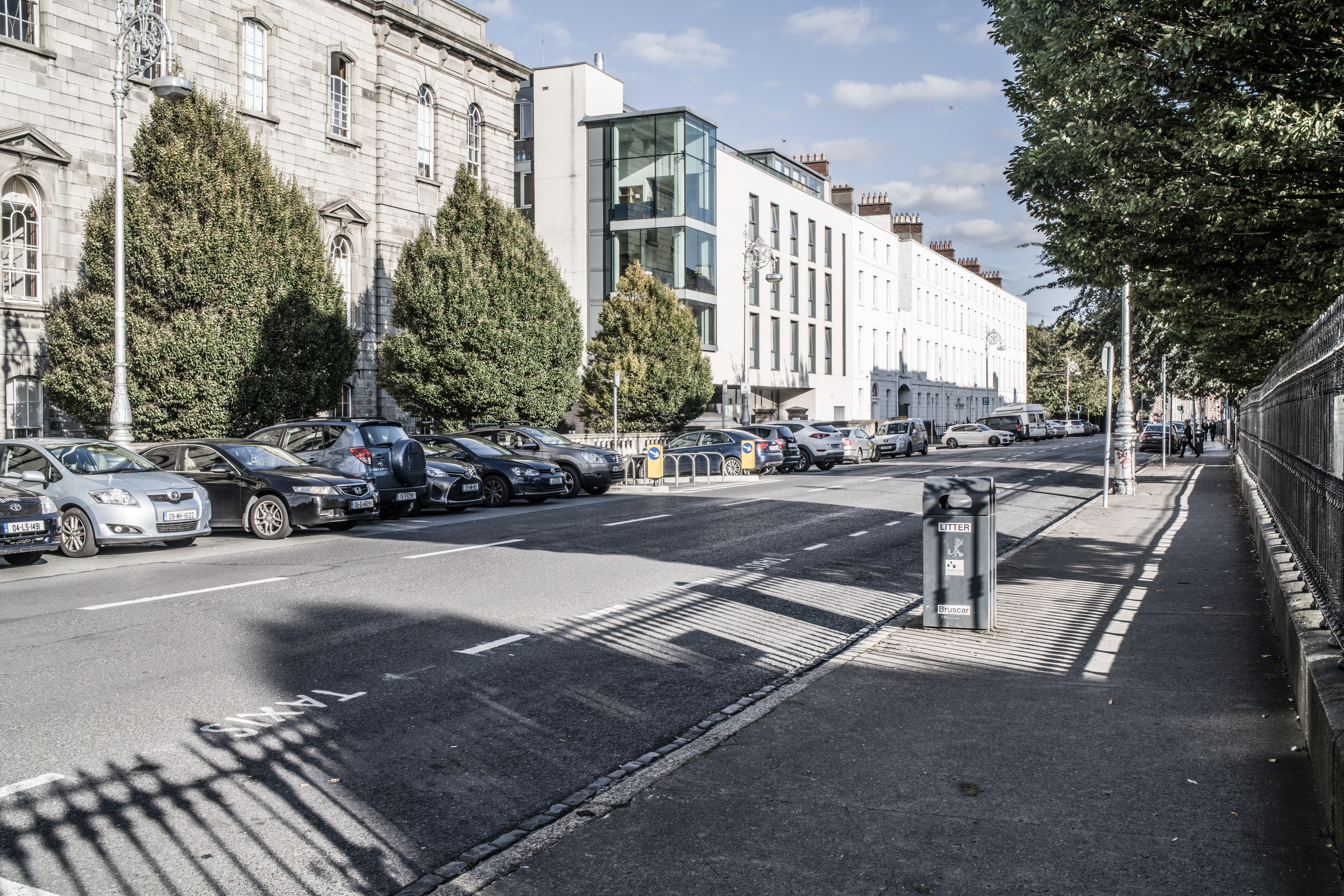

- Location within Central Dublin
- Native name: Sráid Eccles (Irish)
- Namesake: Sir John Eccles
- Length: 430 m (1,410 ft)
- Width: 18 metres (59 ft)
- Location: Dublin, Ireland
- Postal code: D07
- Coordinates: 53.35839°N 6.26685°W
- west end: Berkeley Road
- east end: Dorset Street

Construction
- Inauguration: 6 March 1769

Other
- Designer: Isaac-Ambrose Eccles
- Known for: 7 Eccles Street; Mater Hospital; Georgian architecture

Eccles Street /ˈɛkəlz/ (Irish: Sráid Eccles) is a Georgian street in Dublin, Ireland.

The street is a continuation of Temple Street through Hardwicke Place and across Dorset Street until it ends at a junction with Berkeley Road at the Mater Misericordiae University Hospital.

== History ==
Eccles Street began on 6 March 1769 when Isaac-Ambrose Eccles leased three parcels of land in the area. The street is named after his family, including his grandfather Sir John Eccles, Lord Mayor of Dublin 1710–11 who owned property on the street.

The street was mainly laid out from 1772 by the Gardiner estate ran at that stage by Luke Gardiner, 1st Viscount Mountjoy.

The architects and property developers Francis Johnston and his brother Richard Johnston had lived on and developed numerous houses on the street from at least 1793. Francis lived at number 64 until 1829 and developed four houses on the street from number 30-33 in 1822 for himself and his half brother Andrew Johnston. Johnston's double fronted house on the street also acted as a museum of curios and architectural ornaments and experiments including a large belfry and gothic folly in the rear garden which has since been mostly demolished. It also features classical plaster roundels on the front facade and an octagonal room with an elaborate roof lantern to the rear. The original house was adapted by Johnston but maintained an external appearance in keeping with rest of the street.

From 1847 to at least 1858 William Henry Seale (1835-1898) lived at 60 Eccles Street. A History of Irish Music records: Two organs associated with Handel are still in Ireland. One of them, brought by Handel from England, became the property of the John Loftus, 2nd Marquess of Ely, at whose sale, in 1811, it was purchased by Francis Johnston, who removed it to his house, Number 60 Eccles Street. On his death, in 1845, the house, including the organ, became the property of William Henry Seale, who later opened a clothing shop on Grafton Street in 1859, E & W Seale. For a period, number 60 including the organ became the property of Isaac Butt.

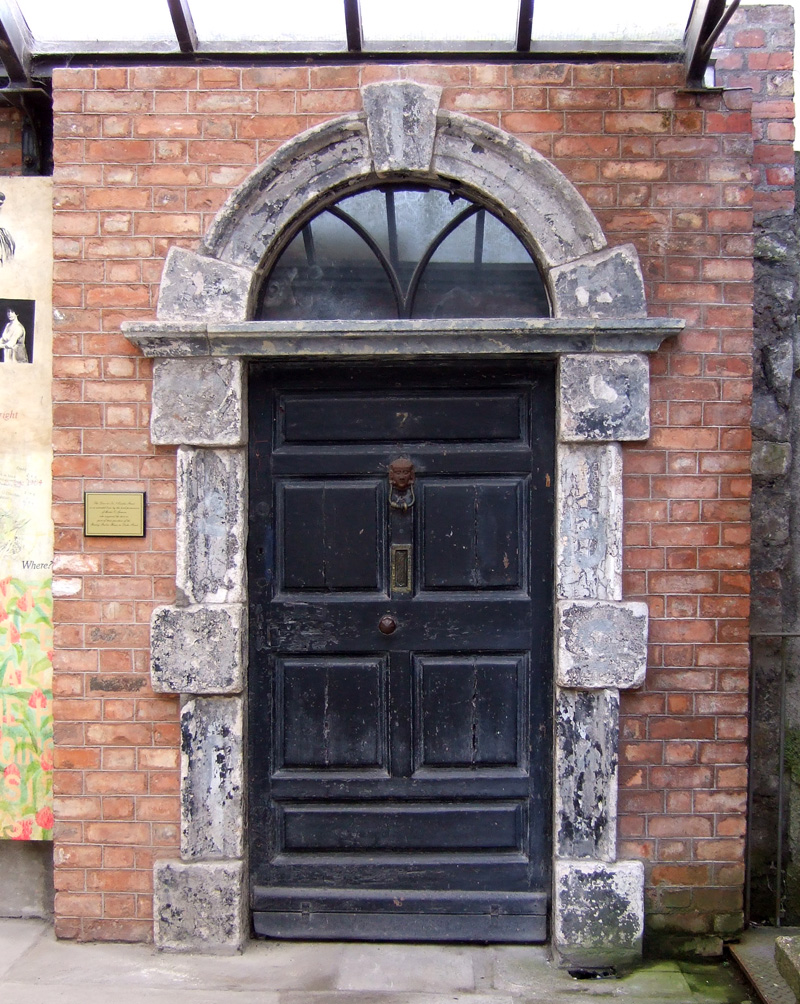
Door of 7 Eccles Street, displayed at the James Joyce Centre

The main hospital building was developed in 1861.

In James Joyce's novel Ulysses (published 1922, set in 1904), the protagonist Leopold Bloom lives at 7 Eccles Street, and the building was treated as a landmark by Joyce fans. No. 7 was demolished in 1967 by the neighbouring Dominican convent as part of an extension development to their school. The door was saved.

Other notable people associated with the street include the publisher Fergus O'Connor (c.1876–1952), who had a premises at number 44, and the artist, Leo Whelan, whose family ran a small hotel from number 65.

=== Mater Hospital redevelopment ===
The Mater Hospital purchased a plot of land on the north side of the street in 1975, building the Mater Private Hospital on the site which finally opened in 1986. The site also has a large surface carpark.

The development saw 36 Georgian houses demolished, despite preservation orders and resistance from groups including An Taisce and the Arts Council. The order then began buying up more Georgian properties on the south side of the street. The windows and doors of three listed houses were illegally blocked up and others were left vacant.

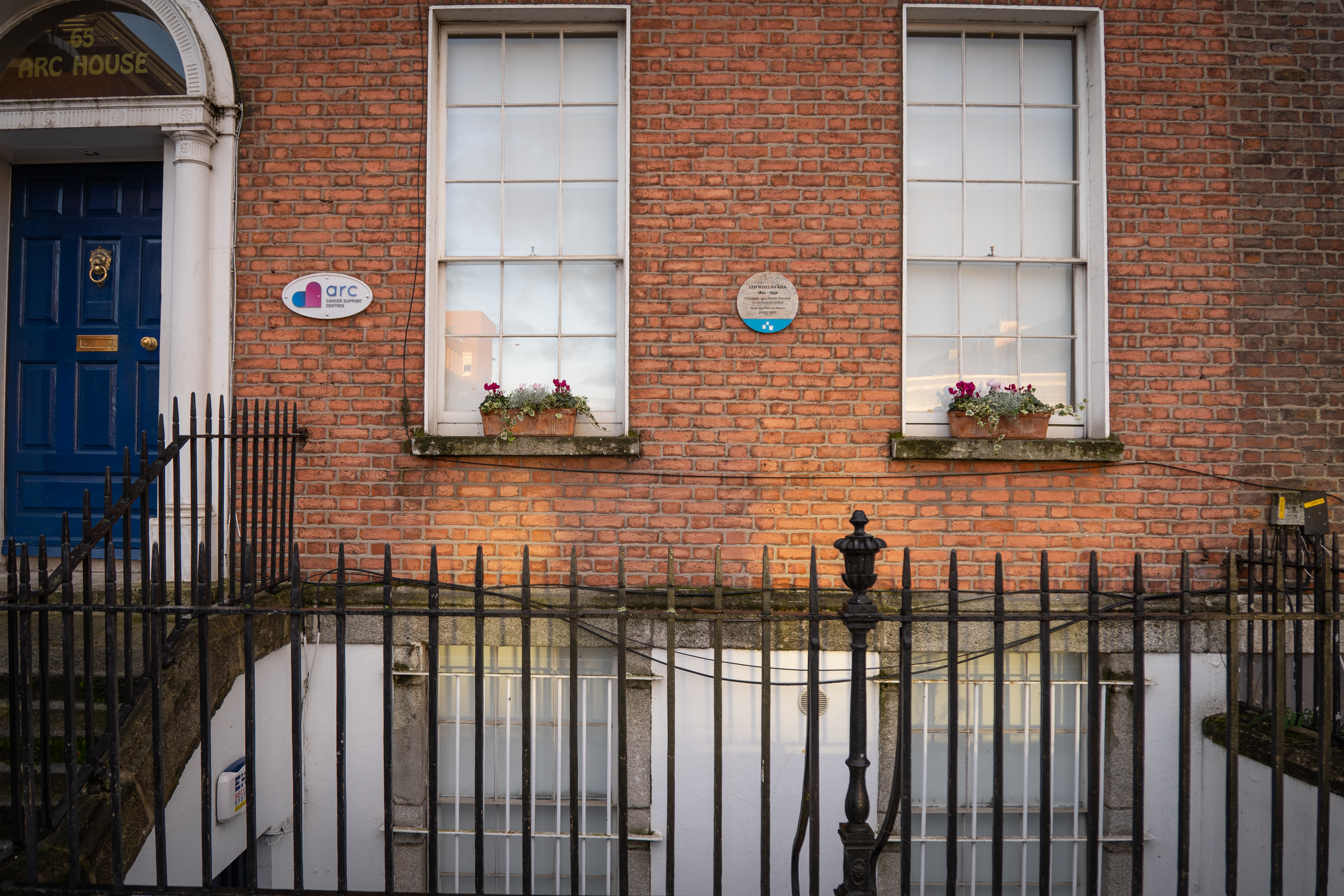
Plaque on painter Leo Whelan's former home, 67 Eccles Street

The Mater invited an inspection of the three Georgian houses by Dublin Corporation in February 1988, when they were deemed dangerous. As a result, the buildings were ordered to be demolished to first or second-floor windowsill level. The houses were occupied by the group Students Against the Destruction of Dublin, and legal proceedings ultimately led to them vacating to allow the demolition to go ahead. The legal case revealed that the Mater Hospital Pools had funded the purchase of 28 of the houses on the south side of the street. By 1988, 2 properties were derelict, and 13 were partly or wholly vacant, including 3 already condemned. It emerged that they were aware the roofs had failed in the three condemned buildings as early as 1986, and had done no repair work allowing for the ultimate destruction of the buildings.

== See also ==
- List of streets and squares in Dublin
- 7 Eccles Street
