= North Great George's Street =

Georgian Street in Dublin, Ireland

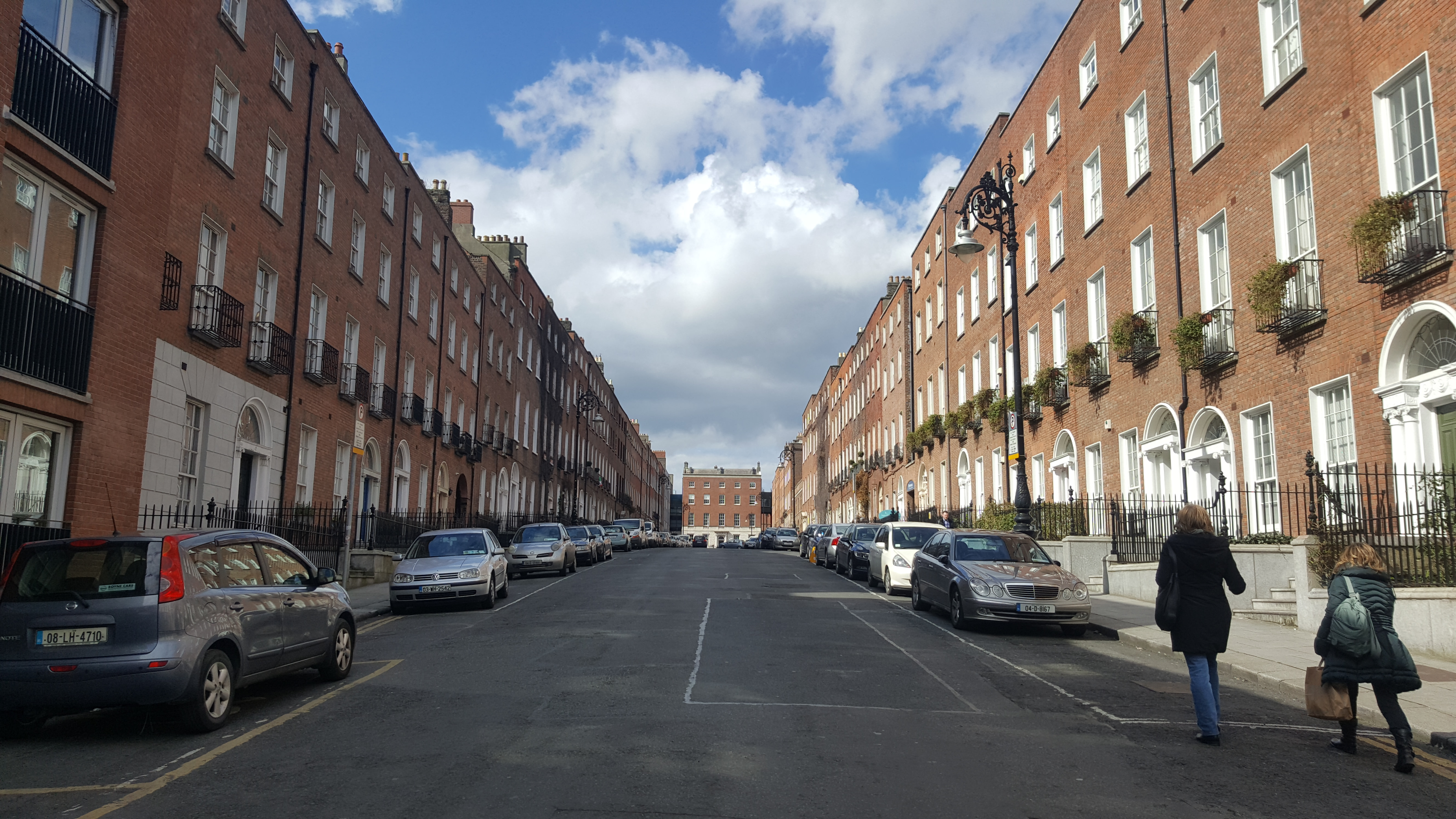
- Looking north west up North Great George's Street

- Location within Central Dublin
- Native name: Sráid Mhór Sheoirse Thuaidh (Irish)
- Former name: George's Street
- Namesake: King George III and the Parish of St. George
- Length: 265 m (869 ft)
- Width: 17 metres (56 ft)
- Location: Dublin, Ireland
- Quarter: Georgian Dublin
- Postal code: D01
- Coordinates: 53°21′15″N 6°15′38″W
- northwest end: Belvedere House (Great Denmark Street)
- southeast end: Parnell Street

Construction
- Commissioned: 1766

Other
- Known for: Georgian Dublin; Architectural conservation Filming Location
- Website: www.northgreatgeorgesstreet.ie

North Great George's Street (Irish: Sráid Mór Seóirse Thuaidh) is a street on the Northside of Dublin city first laid out in 1766 which connects Parnell Street with Great Denmark Street. It consists of opposing terraces of 4-storey over basement red-brick Georgian townhouses descending on an increasingly steep gradient from Belvedere House which bookends the street from a perpendicular aspect to the North.

All of the original houses on the street as well as several other features are listed on the Record of Protected Structures.

== Name ==
There is some speculation over which George the street is named after however it is likely King George III who was reigning monarch at the time of the street's construction. The nearby Church of Ireland parish of St. George and both the earlier Old Church of St George (1668) on Hill Street (previously Lower Temple Street) and the newer church of St George (1802) at Hardwicke Place are within a short walk of the street and may have influenced the naming convention. The street was originally simply named George's Street prior to the laying out of South Great George's Street.

== History ==
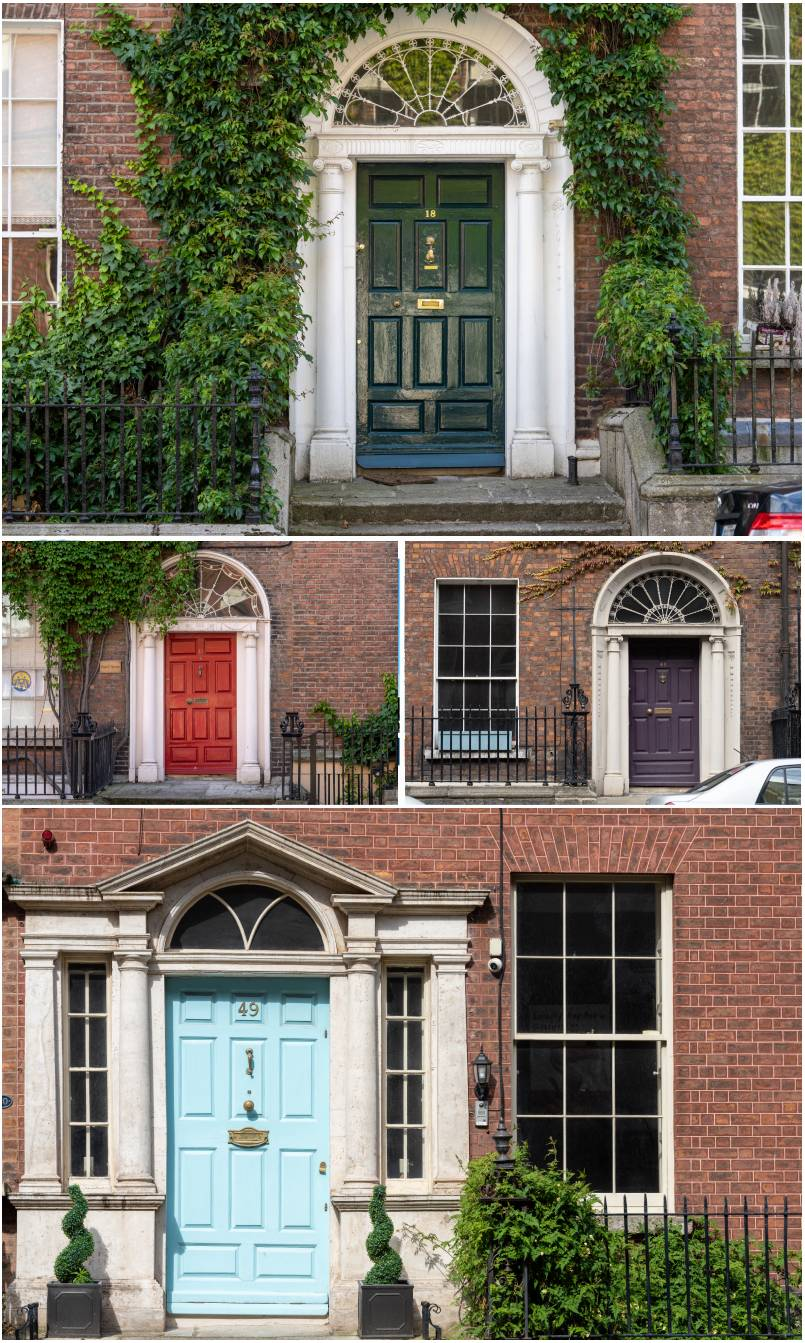
Georgian doorways on North Great George's Street

=== 18th century ===
The street is situated on the grounds of the old Mount Eccles estate which had formed part of the extensive private estate of Sir John Eccles, Lord Mayor of Dublin in 1710. The street was laid out for development by Nicholas Archdall after Royal Assent was given on 7 June 1766 for long leases to be granted for the purposes of building and the directional layout still follows the route of the old driveway to Eccles House.

The street is similar in design and width to the earlier Henrietta Street and Dominick Street and maintains many of its original features including Leinster granite paving, steps, coping and parapets, cast iron ornate coal holes, boot scrapers, snuffers, railings, grilles and gas lamp holders, original doors and ornately fenestrated fanlights and sidelights, granite and calp stone-faced basements, some rusticated granite and portland stone first floors and wooden sash windows with hand blown glass.

Many of the interiors still have original stucco and even fresco work while others have original panelling and wainscoted walls with original lime plastered lathes. Other features which were added during later periods have now become part of the historic fabric of the street including some of the Victorian era cast iron balconettes, cast iron lampposts and gas lamps from various different periods and various creeping plants which extend over the front of several buildings and change colour with the turning of the seasons.

As with many Georgian townhouses of the period, the external appearance is subdued with plain red-brick facades however this often contrasts with elaborately decorated interiors with stuccoed walls and ceilings and ornate marble and Portland stone floor surfaces and carved wooden bannisters and cantilevered stone staircases. Interiors such as at number 19 were often designed and plastered by some of the leading craftsmen of their day such as Michael Stapleton and Andrew Callnan.

=== 19th century ===
By the mid 19th century, the street was in decline through a combination of economic stagnation, the movement of the protestant middle classes and schools to the south of the city and southern suburbs and the decline and move of the gentry more generally after the Acts of Union 1800 and again after the famine in the 1840s and 1850s.

=== 20th century ===
Having largely fallen into disrepair in the early to mid 20th century, a group of conservationists from the Irish Georgian Society including politician David Norris were involved in restoring many of the buildings on the street.

One group of houses towards the South end of the street owned by Dublin Corporation, which was leased to the Legion of Mary, became so derelict that they were demolished in 1984 despite objections and appeals for their preservation. They were later replaced with facsimile Georgian house frontage.

On the southeastern side of the street, seven Georgian houses were demolished from numbers 28-34 between 1984 and 1989. These were also later replaced with facsimile Georgian house frontage.

In 2000, a campaign to enclose one end of the street was launched which included installing gates which were donated to the Irish Georgian Society by Pino Harris and had originally come from Santry Court.

== Residents ==
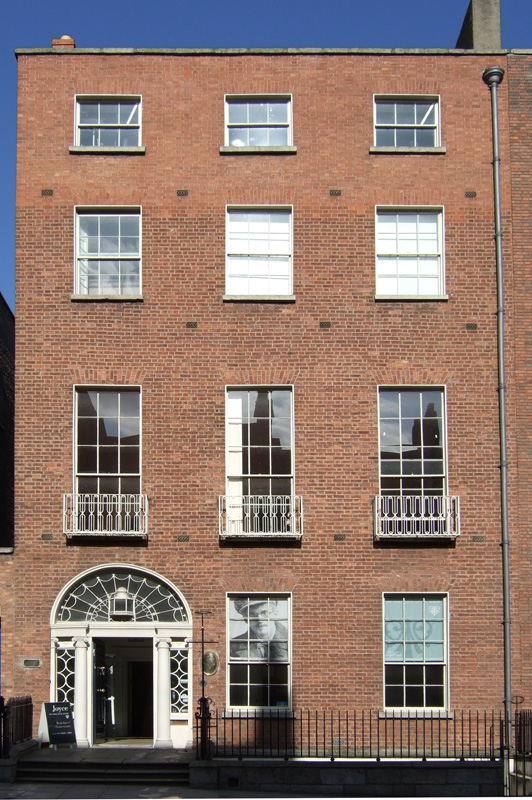
James Joyce Centre at 35 North Great George's Street

The street was originally built for the landed gentry and merchant families as a pied-a-terre and the largest house on the street, No. 43 was actually built from 1786 by Henry Theophilus Clements son of Nathaniel Clements who had developed Henrietta Street. A number of hereditary peers also had properties on the street from the last quarter of the 18th century onwards.

Number	Resident	Year of construction	Comment	Image
2			James Dillon (Fine Gael politician) - born at number 2	
11	Emilia, Dowager Viscountess Powerscourt	1774	Notable rococo stuccowork	
18			Godfrey Fetherstonhaugh resided at the property for a period	
19			Ceiling stuccowork by Michael Stapleton	
20			Samuel Ferguson	
32	Samuel Dick		Charles Thorp and Bryan Bolger involved in construction	
35	Valentine Browne, 1st Earl of Kenmare	1784	Sometimes referred to as Kenmare House. It now contains the James Joyce Centre.	
36		1785		
37		1785	Built by Charles Thorp	
38		1785	Built by Charles Thorp. Later occupied by John Pentland Mahaffy.	
39	Thomas Taylour, 1st Marquess of Headfort	1782	Built by Henry Darley	
40		1782	Built by the Bowen family	
41		1786	Built as a pair with 42 by Henry Darley	
42		1786	Built as a pair with 41 by Henry Darley	
43	Henry Theophilus Clements	1786	Built by Henry Darley Later Richard Laurence and his butler Arthur Guinness resided at no.43	
44			Olivia Owenson, Lady Clarke – Irish poet and dramatist and Sir Arthur Clarke	

Other notable residents of the street have included;

- Henry Bruen (1789–1852) – Politician
- John Dillon – Irish politician; the last leader of the Irish Parliamentary Party (1851–1927)
- Charles Orpen – Irish physician, founded deaf school (1791–1856)
- Sheamus – Irish professional wrestler and actor (born 1978)
- Arthur Shields – Irish actor (1896–1970)
- Sinéad O'Connor – Irish singer and songwriter (1966–2023)
- Shane MacGowan – Irish singer-songwriter (1957–2023)

== See also ==
- List of streets and squares in Dublin
- The Belvedere Hotel (Dublin)
- Belvedere College
