= Ambrose Eccles =

Anglo-Irish scholar (1736–1809)

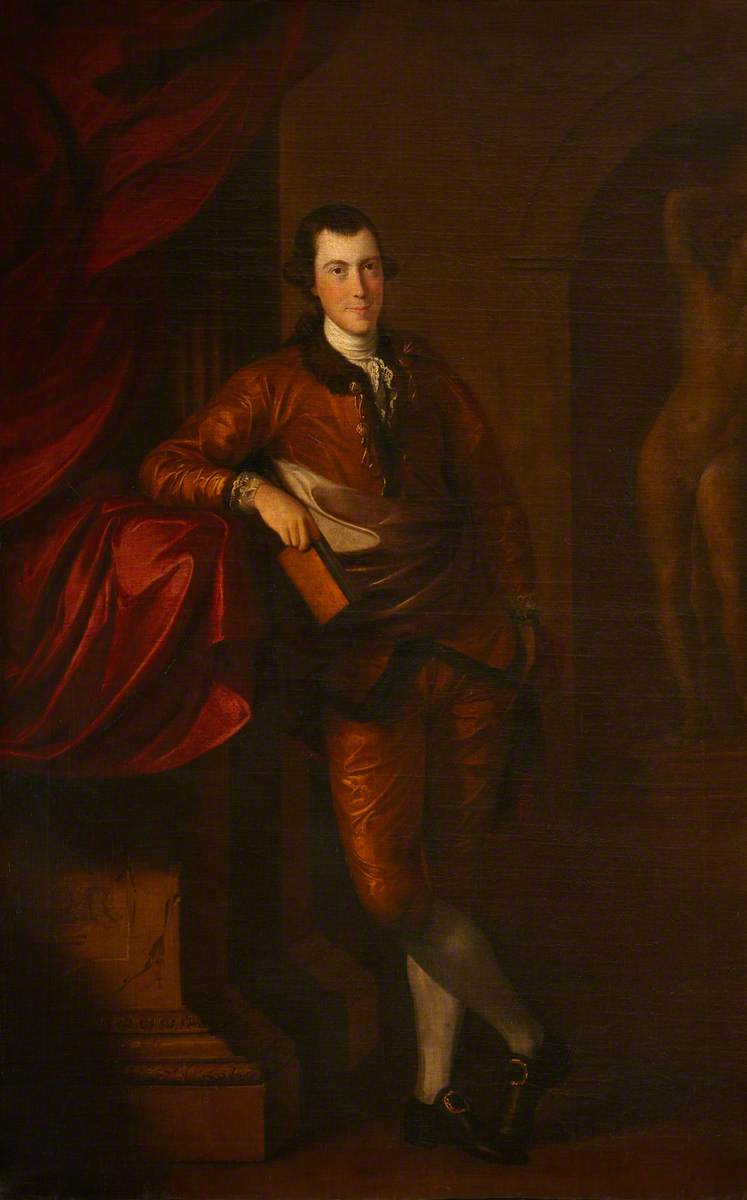
Portrait of Eccles by Robert Hunter

Isaac-Ambrose Eccles (10 January 1736 – 1809) was an Anglo-Irish scholar who specialised in studying Shakespeare.

== Life ==
He was the son of Hugh Eccles, of Cronroe, County Wicklow, and his wife Elizabeth Ambrose. He was the grandson of Sir John Eccles. He was educated at Trinity College Dublin, and then travelled in France and Italy, but returned home through illness.

Eccles was in London in 1763, and was a guest of James Boswell at the Mitre tavern. He died in 1809, at his seat at Cronroe.

== Works ==
Eccles was a dramatic critic, and published editions of several of Shakespeare's plays, in which he transposed scenes that appeared to him to be wrongly placed. These plays were Cymbeline, 1793; King Lear, 1793; and Merchant of Venice, 1805. They contained notes and illustrations, with critical and historical essays.

== Family ==
Eccles married Grace Ball, eldest daughter of Thomas Ball of Urker, County Armagh. They had three sons and three daughters. Among the sons was Major Hugh Eccles, whose daughter Elizabeth Eccles married Henry Ward, 5th Viscount Bangor.
