= Fergus O'Connor (publisher) =

Irish publisher and nationalist

- Born: c. 1876; Cork, Ireland
- Died: 12 August 1952; Dublin, Ireland
- Occupation: Publisher
- Notable work: Fergus O'Connor Collection at the National Library of Ireland

Fergus O'Connor (c. 1876–12 August 1952) was an Irish publisher and supporter of Irish Independence. Born in Cork, but working mostly in Dublin, he was imprisoned for his role in support of the 1916 Easter Rising. He later printed several early works of Seán O'Casey. The National Library of Ireland holds a collection of his photographic images.

== Life ==
O'Connor was born in Cork c. 1876, later moving to Dublin where he operated a publishing business from Eccles Street.

According to his military pension record, O'Connor was a member of the 1st Dublin Battalion of the Irish Volunteers, and he is described in some sources as a "1916 veteran". He printed and published nationalist postcards and other materials, a number of which were seized when O'Connor's premises were raided by the Dublin Castle authorities in the aftermath of the 1916 Rising. Arrested for his role in the Rising, O'Connor was interned in England, first in Dartmoor Prison in 1916, and subsequently in Lewes Prison in 1917. Upon his release from prison, he returned to Cork in June 1917 where he (along with fellow prisoners Thomas Hunter, David Kent, Diarmuid Lynch, Liam Tobin and J. J. Walsh) were met by an "enthusiastic" crowd.

Following his release, O'Connor returned to publishing, and he printed several early works of Seán O'Casey. These included two editions of Casey's Songs of the Wren, published in 1918. O'Connor also published A Call to the Women of Ireland, from a lecture by Constance Markievicz, in 1918. He also printed documents associated with the First Dáil of the revolutionary Irish Republic.

O'Connor died in August 1952, and is buried in Kinsale, County Cork. His wife, Maude, inherited a number of his papers. Several of O'Connor's publications, including photographs and ephemera, are held in the National Library of Ireland's "Fergus O'Connor collection".
