= Olivier Cornet Gallery =

Contemporary art gallery in Dublin, Ireland

- Gailearaí Olivier Cornet

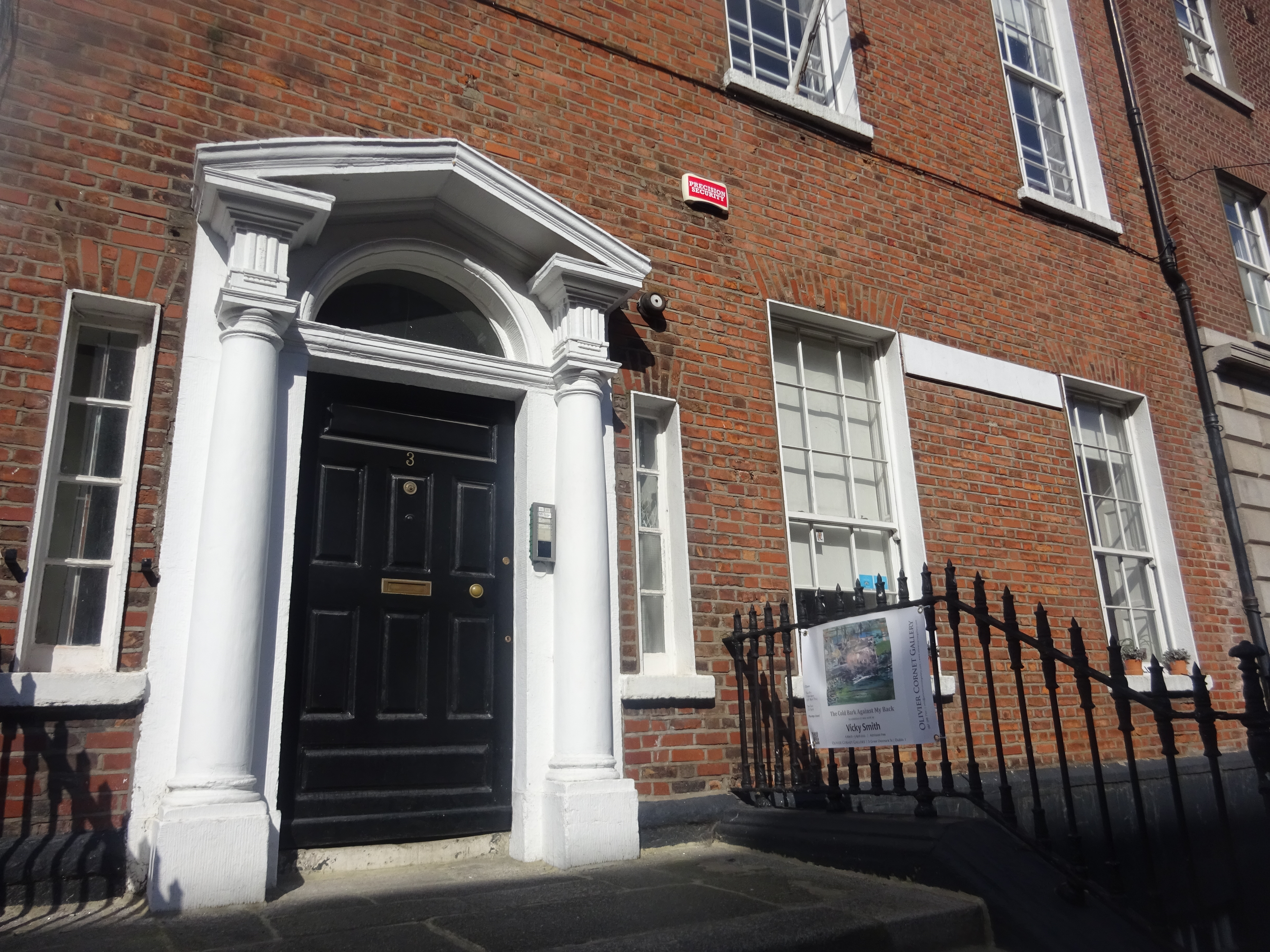

- Location within Central Dublin
- Established: January 2012
- Location: 3 Great Denmark Street, Dublin, Ireland
- Coordinates: 53°21′19″N 6°15′45″W
- Type: contemporary art gallery
- Founder: Olivier Cornet
- Public transit access: Parnell Luas stop (Green Line)
- Parking: Q-Park Clery's
- Website: oliviercornetgallery.com

The Olivier Cornet Gallery (French pronunciation: [ɔlivje kɔʁnɛ]) is a contemporary commercial art gallery in Dublin, Ireland, owned and run by French-born Olivier Cornet.

== History ==
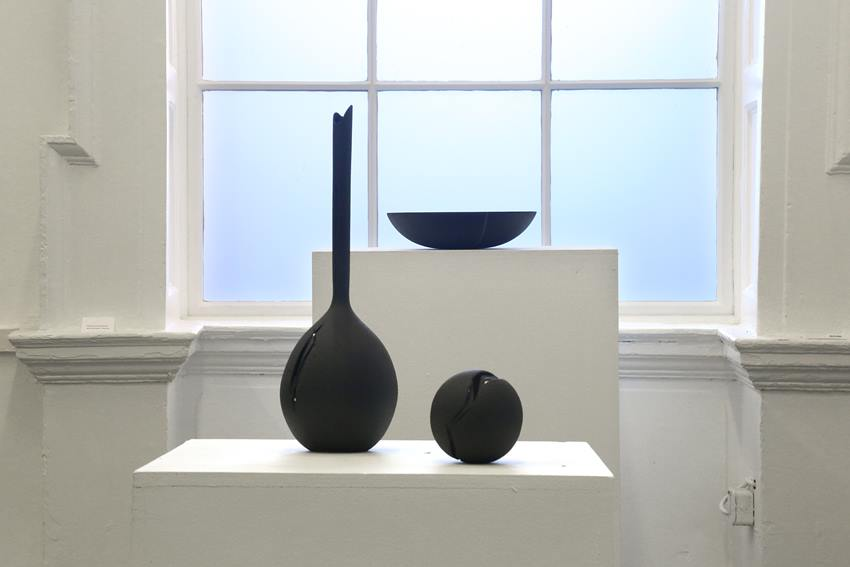
Ceramics in the Olivier Cornet Gallery

Olivier Cornet originally came to Ireland from France in the late 1980s. His interest in art derives from collecting stamps which featured famous French artists as a teen, as well as his grandmother's amateur painting practice. In the early 1990s, Cornet did his military service as a Cultural Animator at the French Cultural Centre of Lilongwe in Malawi, where part of his brief was to organise art exhibitions.

Cornet organised and curated exhibitions of Irish visual art in various locations in Dublin under the name "Olliart" from 2004. In 2012 he opened the Olivier Cornet Gallery in Temple Bar. settling in its current location on Great Denmark Street in 2015, the former home of The Lord Norbury.

== Exhibitions and artists ==
The gallery organises several solo exhibitions every year, and is open every day (except on Mondays) with free admission. It represents the artists Annika Berglund, Hugh Cummins, Jordi Forniés, Conrad Frankel, Eoin Mac Lochlainn, Miriam McConnon, Yanny Petters, Kelly Ratchford and Susanne Wawra. It has also exhibited the work of artists such as Gerald Davis and members of its "associate gallery artists" group, which includes the artists Mary A. Fitzgerald, David Fox, Nickie Hayden, Sheila Naughton and Vicky Smith. The gallery has also been noted, by Irish Times critic Aidan Dunne, "for curating good thematic shows" and, in Irish Arts Review, for its collaborative approach. Themed shows have centered around topics such as climate change, the environment, identity, notoriety and fake news. The gallery also curates a show annually for the June Bloomsday festival in Dublin, each time choosing a different theme related to James Joyce's novel Ulysses.
