= Jordi Forniés =

Spanish painter

- Born: Jordi Forniés; 14 November 1971 (age 54); Huesca, Aragon, Spain
- Education: Universitat Rovira i Virgili
- Known for: Painting
- Website: jordifornies.net

Jordi Forniés ([ˈʒɔɾði fɔɾniˈes]; born 14 November 1971) is a Spanish Catalan artist, who has been active as painter, photographer, wall artist, music composer and gallery artist. He is known for his meticulous paintings and artwork of motives and details of everyday life and interpretation of the world. Forniés has been featured in exhibitions around the world, with works in collections such as Patrimonio Historico Nacional, Museu d'Art Modern de Tarragona, The Irish Office of Public Works (OPW), Consorcio de Museos de la Comunidad de Valencia, and Ayuntamiento de Fraga and Ayuntamiento de Monzon (Spain).

== Early life and career ==
Born on Huesca in Spain in 1971, Forniés family moved from Huesca to Vila-seca (Tarragona) in Spain when he was 4 years old. He had a keen interest in the music and at the age of 7, he started learning piano and music studies. To learn the classical piano professionally, Forniés joined Conservatorio Profesional de Musica de Vila-seca, where he continued for almost 10 years. He received his doctorate in chemistry at the Universitat Rovira i Virgili in 1998. He worked for the CNRS (French National Scientific Research) until 2000, then he moved back to Spain until 2006. A self-taught artist, Forniés' work was first exhibited in 2005 at ARTERIA and Galeria ESART in Barcelona.

In 2006, he moved to Ireland, and since then he has lived and worked in Ireland and Singapore, creating public art and exhibitions. In 2008 he completed a master's degree in Marketing and Communication Management from Universitat Oberta de Catalunya. From 2006 to 2014, he participated in several Solo and group exhibitions primarily in Spain, Ireland and United States. In 2013, he was artist in residence at the Swatch Art Peace Hotel, Shanghai.

Forniés developed the Constellations Project, a multi-site, an international art project to connect cities and experiences on the walls. He toured various Asian Cities including Singapore, Delhi, Tokyo, Jakarta, Penang, Seoul and others. He worked on the wall in these cities and narrated a story of his exploration of cities through his artwork. Forniés displayed the project through Photography, Painting and Music.

His projects have engaged in international art audiences through exhibitions in Singapore, Spain and Ireland. His street events in the Asian cities and exhibitions, have introduced Forniés' work to the general public. In 2014, he received the Joaquin Costa Award. Major publications on Forniés' work include Paisaje Condicionado, Artiga, Blow Magazine and 2014 Descubrir el Arte. Others include the Faces & Traces and Harper's Bazaar Art in 2014 and 2015 by the Swatch Group.

In addition to the artwork, he composed music for Aletsch – At Glaciers' End – A Film by Caroline Fink, Gitta Gsell documentaries, Yan Preston Photographic Exhibition and Constellations project.

== Selected exhibitions ==
- ARTERIA, Monzón, 2005
- Galeria ESART, Barcelona, 2006
- Museu de la Pell, Barcelona, 2006
- 'Magic Logic', Dame Street Gallery (curated by Olivier Cornet), Dublin, 2007
- 'Metaphors', Dame Street Gallery (curated by Olivier Cornet), Dublin, 2008
- Noho Gallery, New York, 2008
- Smock Alley Theatre, Dublin, 2010
- Espacios – Olivier Cornet Gallery, Dublin, 2012
- Convergence – Olivier Cornet Gallery, 2012
- Museu d'Art Modern de Tarragona, 2013
- The Water Tank Project, 2014
- Centre del Carmen, Consorci de Museus de la Comunitat Valenciana, 2014
- Centro de Arte y Naturaleza (CDAN) Huesca, 2014
- Olivier Cornet Gallery, 2014
- Paisaje Condicionado – Las Cigarreras, 2014
- Art Equity, Singapore, 2014
- 'Esencia y Vida de la Coleccion de Arte, 2015
- Olivier Cornet Gallery, Dublin, 2015
