= Donie Cassidy =

Irish former politician and businessman (born 1945)

Leader of the Seanad
- In office 3 July 2007 – 25 May 2011
- Taoiseach: Bertie Ahern; Brian Cowen
- Preceded by: Mary O'Rourke
- Succeeded by: Maurice Cummins
- In office 17 September 1997 – 17 May 2002
- Taoiseach: Bertie Ahern
- Preceded by: Maurice Manning
- Succeeded by: Mary O'Rourke

Senator
- In office 23 June 2007 – 25 May 2011
- In office 13 May 1982 – 17 May 2002
- Constituency: Labour Panel

Teachta Dála
- In office May 2002 – May 2007
- Constituency: Westmeath

Personal details
- Born: 15 September 1945 (age 81) Castlepollard, County Westmeath, Ireland
- Party: Fianna Fáil
- Spouse: Anne Geraghty (m. 1978)
- Children: 4

Daniel Cassidy (born 15 September 1945) is an Irish former Fianna Fáil politician who served as Leader of the Seanad from 2007 to 2011. He served as a Senator for the Labour Panel from 1982 to 2002 and 2007 to 2011 and a Teachta Dála (TD) for the Westmeath constituency from 2002 to 2007.

== Early and personal life ==
Cassidy was born in Castlepollard in County Westmeath. He came to prominence in Ireland through the show band scene. A saxophone player with Jim Tobin and the Firehouse, he moved into showbusiness management. He was the manager of Foster and Allen, a popular singing duo that enjoyed success inside and outside Ireland.

== Political career ==
He first held political office in 1982 when he was elected as a Fianna Fáil Senator for the Labour Panel. He was a member of Westmeath County Council from 1985 until 2003 at which point he resigned from the council due to the abolition of the dual mandate.

Cassidy was elected to Dáil Éireann for the Westmeath constituency at the 2002 general election, taking the seat of sitting TD and Government Minister Mary O'Rourke. This created a rift between the two politicians and Cassidy lost his seat to O'Rourke at the 2007 general election when both candidates contested the Longford–Westmeath constituency. The fact that Cassidy lost most of his home base of Castlepollard and north Westmeath due to the redrawing of the constituency did not help him. On 22 June 2007, Cassidy was nominated by the Taoiseach Bertie Ahern to Seanad Éireann and was appointed Leader of the Seanad for the remaining weeks of the 22nd Seanad's existence. Cassidy was subsequently elected to the Labour Panel at the 2007 Seanad general election and was Leader of the Seanad until March 2011. He lost his seat at the 2011 Seanad election.

=== Golfgate ===
Cassidy was President of the Oireachtas Golf Society during the "GolfGate" controversy in August 2020, in which 81 prominent figures attended a dinner in Clifden, County Galway during COVID-19 restrictions.

Cassidy resigned on 23 August 2020 as vice president of Fianna Fáil following criticism of his arranging of the event. In a statement, he said: “In light of the ongoing controversy surrounding the Oireachtas Golf Society dinner in Clifden, and due to the fact that the matter is subject to a garda investigation, I tendered my resignation as Leas Úachtaráin of Fianna Fáil to Sean Dorgan General Secretary yesterday."

In February 2021, it was announced by the Garda Síochána that Cassidy was to face charges over his alleged breaches of COVID-19 regulations by arranging the golf dinner. On 3 February 2022, Cassidy and his co-defendants were acquitted of all charges they faced. The Court concluded: “They were all responsible people who would not have gone to a dinner unless they felt comfortable and unless the organisers had not put in place all that was required to make it safe. I'm satisfied the organisers did everything to comply - not in a court of public opinion - but in the court of law in my opinion. Unfortunately, very good people lost very good jobs and very good contracts and just to clarify, I didn’t make my decision based on that." Grealish said he was “delighted with the outcome". Donie Cassidy, described as being emotional when leaving the court, said he was always a lawmaker and never a law-breaker.

== Business interests ==
Cassidy owns four hotels, including one on the former site of the National Wax Museum as well as The Belvedere Hotel on Great Denmark Street. He also owns Celtic Note, a specialist Irish music store on Dublin's Nassau Street and since 1984 has had the franchise to sell CDs and DVDs at Dublin Airport. He also owns several buildings in Mullingar. His other interests include record and music publishing companies. He owns the publishing rights to many well known songs such as "Grace" and "My Lovely Rose of Clare".

| Dáil | Election | Deputy (Party) | Deputy (Party) | Deputy (Party) |
|---|---|---|---|---|
| 27th | 1992 | Willie Penrose (Lab) | Mary O'Rourke (FF) | Paul McGrath (FG) |
| 28th | 1997 | Willie Penrose (Lab) | Mary O'Rourke (FF) | Paul McGrath (FG) |
| 29th | 2002 | Willie Penrose (Lab) | Donie Cassidy (FF) | Paul McGrath (FG) |
| 30th | 2007 | Constituency abolished. See Longford–Westmeath | | |
