= Belvedere House, Dublin =

Georgian townhouse in Dublin, Ireland

Belvedere House
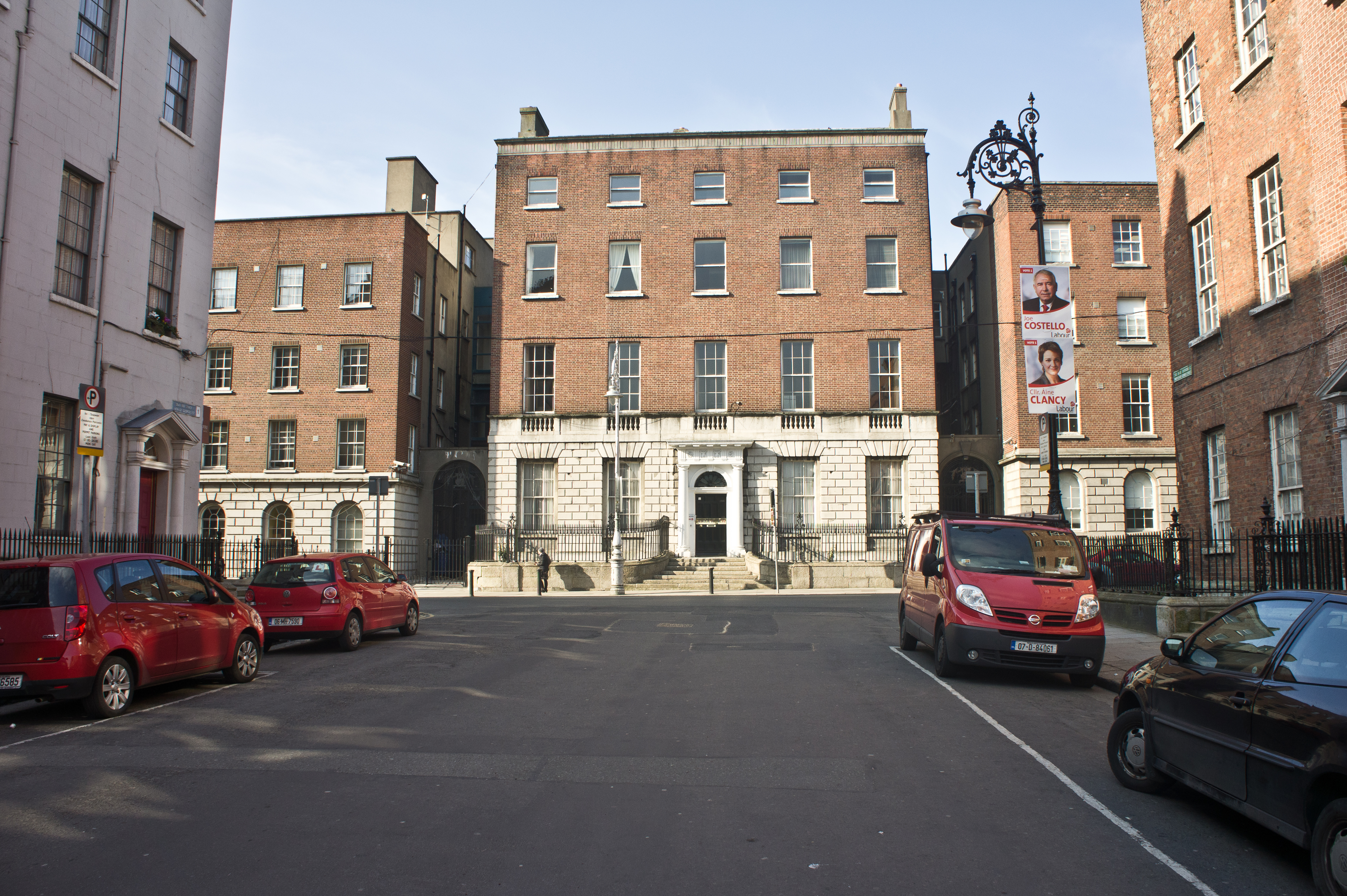
- Belvedere House in 2011
- Interactive map of the Belvedere House area
- Alternative names: Belvedere House

General information
- Type: School administrative building and museum
- Location: Great Denmark Street, Ireland
- Coordinates: 53.35544°N 6.26202°W
- Groundbreaking: 1765
- Completed: 1786

Design and construction
- Architects: Robert West, Michael Stapleton (Interior stucco work)

Belvedere House is a historic townhouse located on Great Denmark Street bookending North Great George's Street in Dublin, Ireland. It was built by George Rochfort, 2nd Earl of Belvedere between 1775 and 1786 at a cost of £24,000. The design and stucco of the interior ceilings was carried out by Michael Stapleton, a leading stuccodor and craftsman of his time. In 1841 it became a Jesuit college which houses the school Belvedere College.

It is allegedly haunted by the ghost of Rochfort's mother, Mary Molesworth, 1st Lady of Belvedere, who died there.

Belvedere House is located near the Garden of Remembrance and James Joyce Centre.

== Building ==
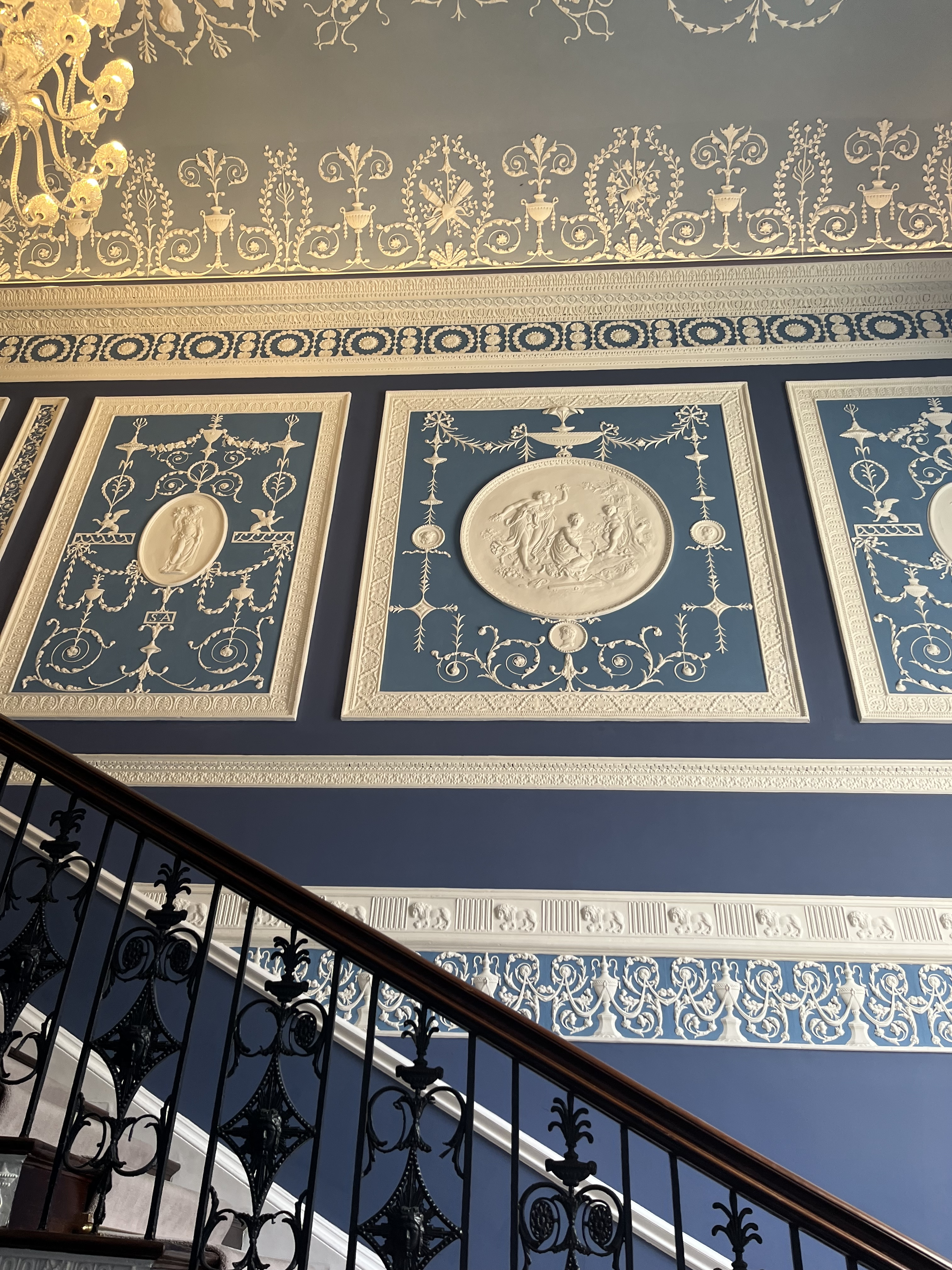
Interior stucco work by Michael Stapleton.

The building is a detached symmetrical 5-bay, 4-storey over basement structure which was refaced in red brick in the 1950s. It has a rusticated Portland stone facade to the raised basement level. The balustrade of the first floor level is also faced in Portland stone while there is a granite parapet and frieze over the top floor.
