= Leo Whelan =

Irish painter

- Born: Michael Leo Whelan; 17 January 1892; Fairview, Dublin, Ireland
- Died: 6 November 1956 (aged 64)
- Resting place: Glasnevin Cemetery
- Known for: Portrait and genre painting

Leo Whelan RHA (17 January 1892 – 6 November 1956) was an Irish portrait and genre painter.

== Early life and education ==
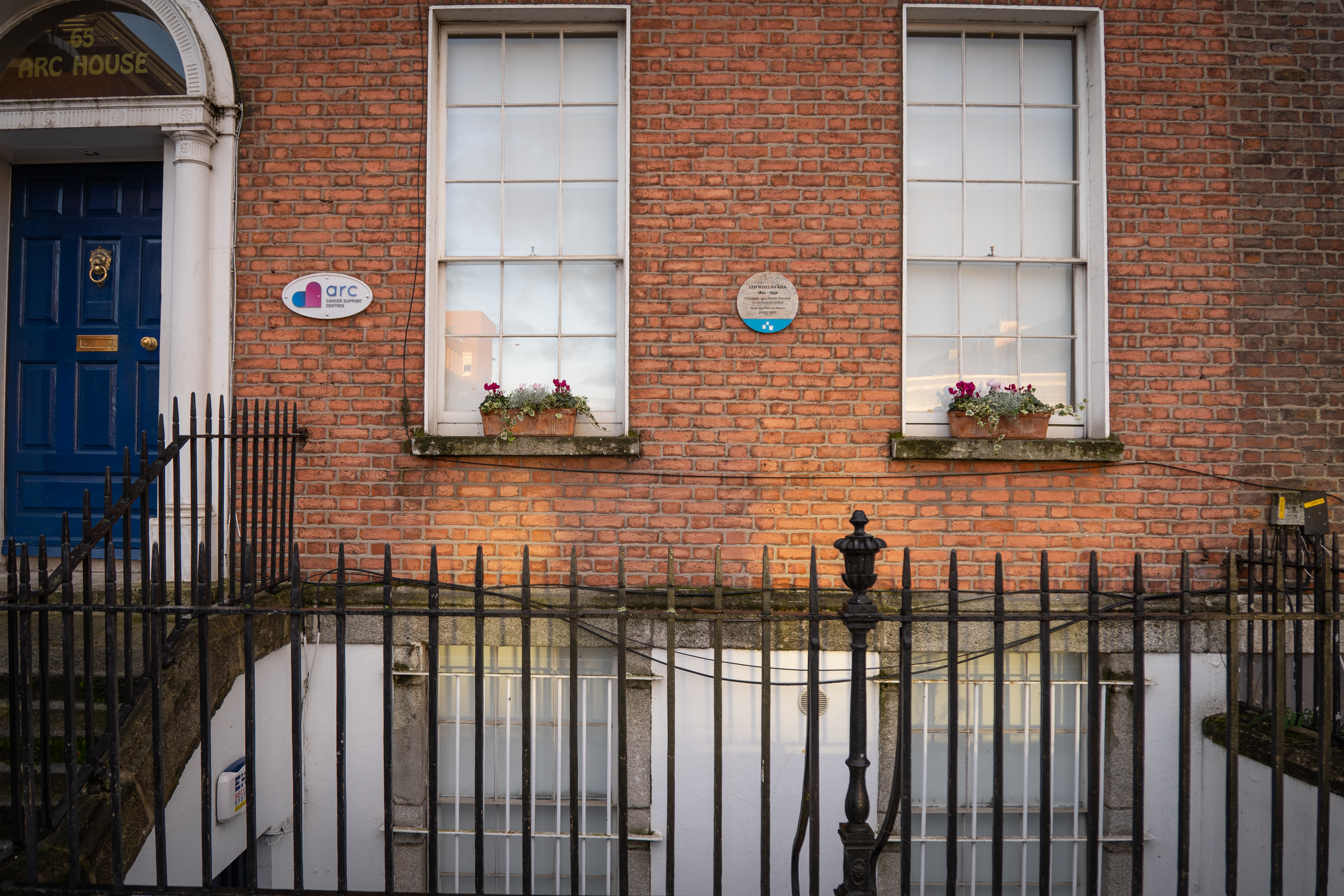
Plaque on Leo Whelan's former home, 67 Eccles Street

Michael Leo Whelan was born on 17 January 1892 at 20 St George's Villas, Fairview, Dublin. His parents were Maurice, a draper, whose family came from County Kerry, and Mary Whelan (née Cruise), from County Roscommon. He had one brother and three sisters. The family moved to 65 Eccles Street, from which his parents ran a small hotel. He was educated at Belvedere College and the Metropolitan School of Art from 1908 to 1914, where he was a student of William Orpen. Fellow students included Seán Keating and Patrick Tuohy.

He first exhibited at the Royal Hibernian Academy (RHA) in 1911, and was awarded the Taylor Art Scholarship five years later in 1916.

== Career ==
He exhibited nearly 250 works at the RHA from 1911 until 1956. He was elected an associate of the RHA in 1920, and a full member in 1924. In 1922, his work was included in the Exposition d'art irlandais at the Galerie Barbazanges in Paris. In 1924, he taught at both the RHA schools and the Metropolitan School of Art. His studios from 1914 to 1927 was at 64 Dawson Street, and from 1931 to 1956 at 7 Lower Baggot Street.

From the 1910s, he painted many portraits including those of Irish Republican Army volunteers, including General Richard Mulcahy and Michael Collins. After the death of his parents in the 1920s, these portraits were a lucrative source of income in supporting his siblings. He was awarded a medal at the 1926 Tailteann games for his portrait of Louis Claude Purser. He was a member of the Royal Society of Portrait Painters, exhibiting 17 paintings with them. He also exhibited two works with the Royal Academy. He also painted genre paintings, particularly kitchen interiors.

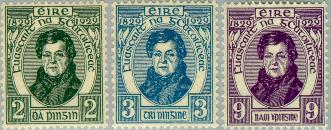
Daniel O'Connell 1929 stamp designed by Whelan

He was the designer of the first Free State commemorative stamp, issued in 1929 for the Centenary of Catholic Emancipation, a portrait of Daniel O'Connell. One of his closest friends was tenor John McCormack, who unsuccessfully tried to persuade Whelan to move to the United States.

For the 1932 Eucharistic Congress, he was commissioned by the Thomas Haverty trust to paint a scene from the life of St Patrick, which resulted in The baptism by St Patrick of Ethna the fair and Fedelmia the ruddy, daughters of the Ard Rí Laoghaire. His work was part of the painting event in the art competition at the 1932 Summer Olympics.

Many of his political portraits now hang within Leinster House. He also painted the portraits of two Irish presidents, Douglas Hyde and Seán T. O'Kelly, both displayed in Áras an Uachtaráin. He designed a second commemorative stamp in 1954, with a reproduction of the portrait bust of John Henry Newman, marking the centenary of the Catholic University of Ireland.

He was elected an honorary academician of the Ulster Academy of Arts in 1931, and of the Royal Ulster Academy in 1950. He was also a member of the United Arts Club from 1934. Active in the RHA, he also served on the board of governors of the National Gallery of Ireland, and the advisory committee of the Municipal Gallery of Modern Art.

He lived with his sisters at 65 Eccles Street, where they continued to run the family hotel. Whelan died from leukaemia on 6 November 1956 in the Mater private nursing home. He is buried in Glasnevin Cemetery. A plaque to Whelan was erected on the former family home on Eccles Street in 2015 by the Dublin City Council.
