= Great Denmark Street =

Street in Dublin, Ireland

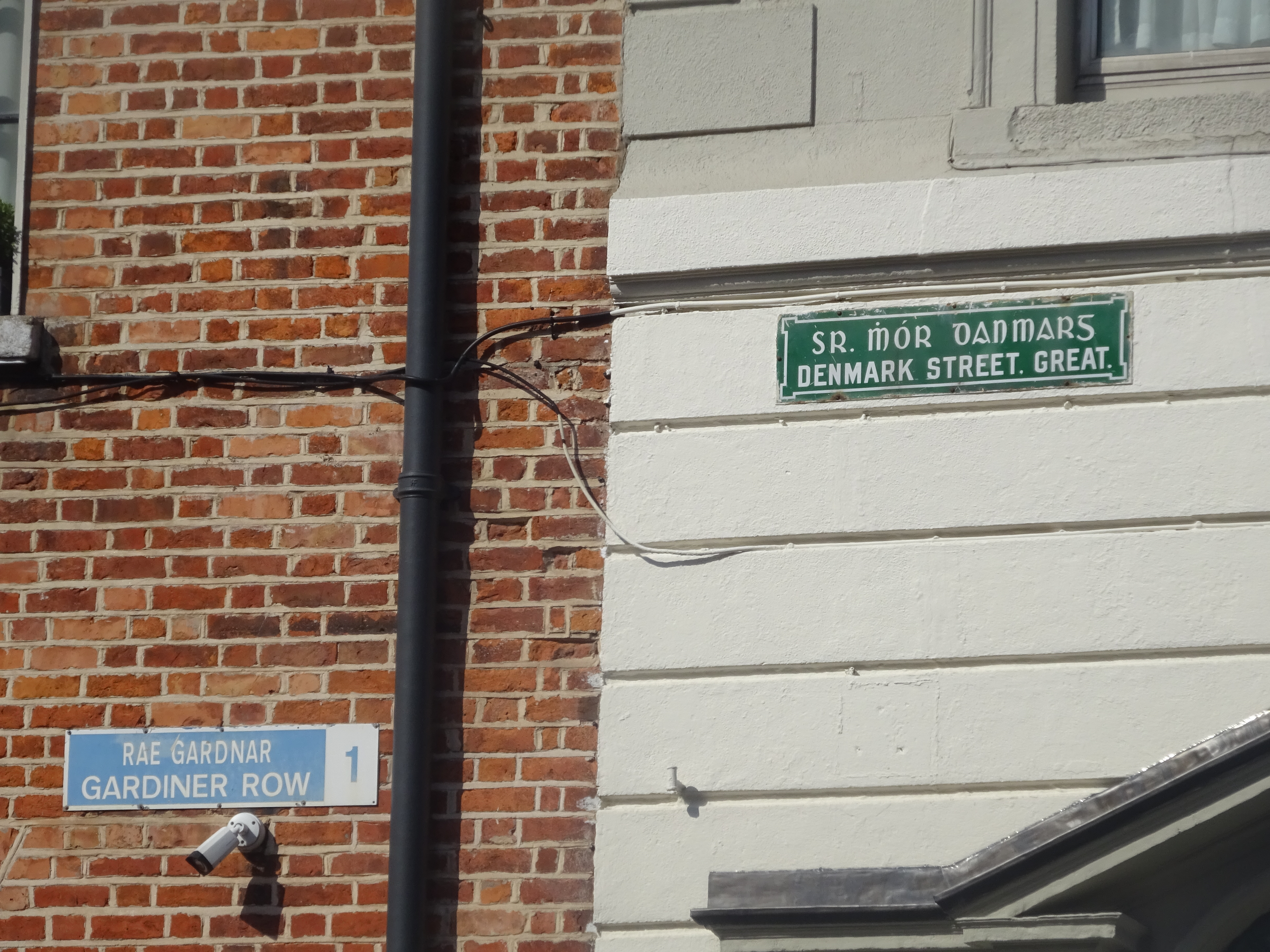
- Street signs at the point where Gardiner Row meets Great Denmark Street
- Interactive map of Great Denmark Street
- Native name: Sráid na Danmhairge Mhór (Irish)
- Namesake: Caroline Matilda, Queen Consort of Denmark and Norway
- Length: 140 m (460 ft)
- Width: 18 metres (59 ft)
- Location: Dublin, Ireland
- Postal code: D01
- Coordinates: 53°21′19″N 6°15′43″W
- west end: Gardiner Row, Rutland Place
- Major junctions: North Great George's Street
- east end: Gardiner Place, Hill Street, Temple Street

Other
- Known for: Belvedere College; O'Reilly Theatre; Olivier Cornet Gallery

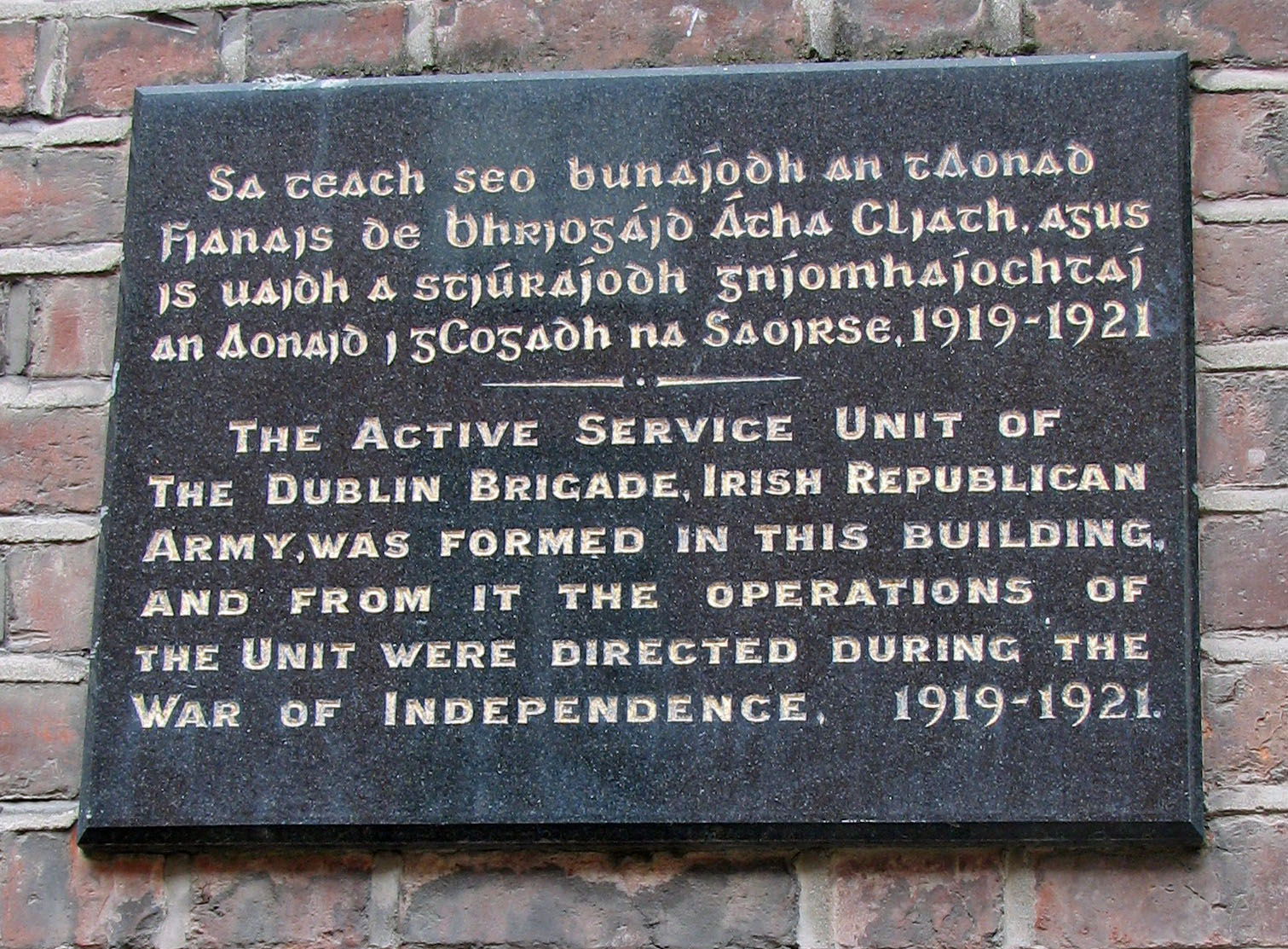
Wall plaque on Great Denmark St commemorating the Irish War of Independence

Great Denmark Street (Irish: Sráid na Danmhairge Mhór) is a Georgian street in Dublin, Ireland. It leads from Parnell Square to Mountjoy Square and is crossed by Temple Street/Hill Street, and forms part of Gardiner Row.

== History ==
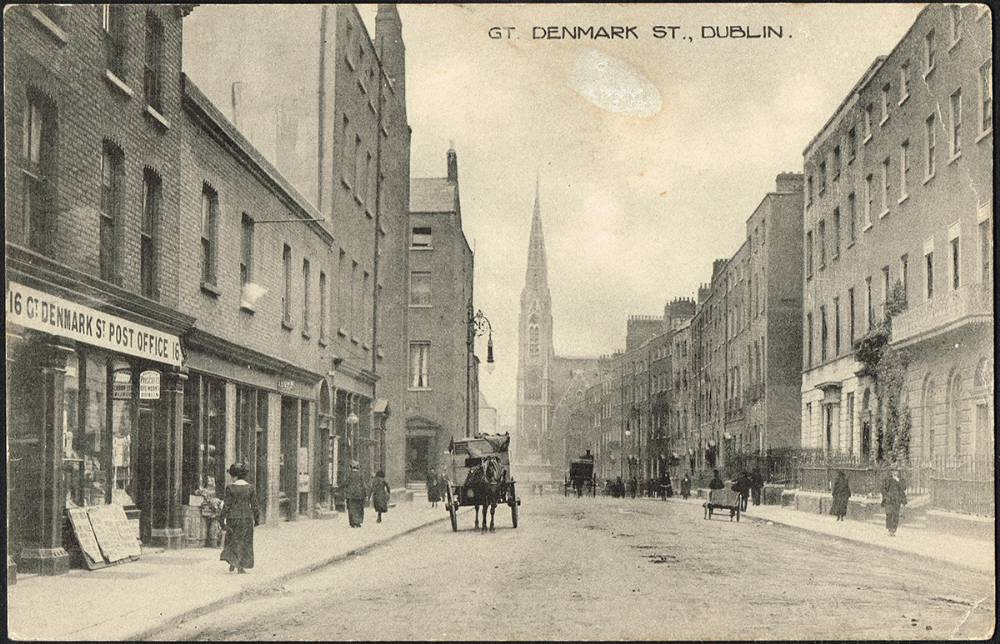

Denmark Street was part of Gardiner Row until 1792. Gardiner Row had itself been laid out from 1765-68 by property developer John Ensor who developed many of the grandest houses on the street near Parnell Square.

The area was largely a semi-rural area until the 1760s when a number of townhouses were built for the landed gentry in the area.

The street was possibly renamed after the sister of George III in 1775; Caroline Matilda had married the Danish king Christian VII in 1766, divorced in 1772 and died in 1775.

The more modest Victorian red brick buildings close to the junction with Temple Street were built around 1900 as retail premises.

The "Great" in the name distinguishes it from Little Denmark Street, a street connecting Henry Street and Parnell Street that ceased to exist in 1976 due to the construction of the Ilac Centre.

== Residents and occupants ==
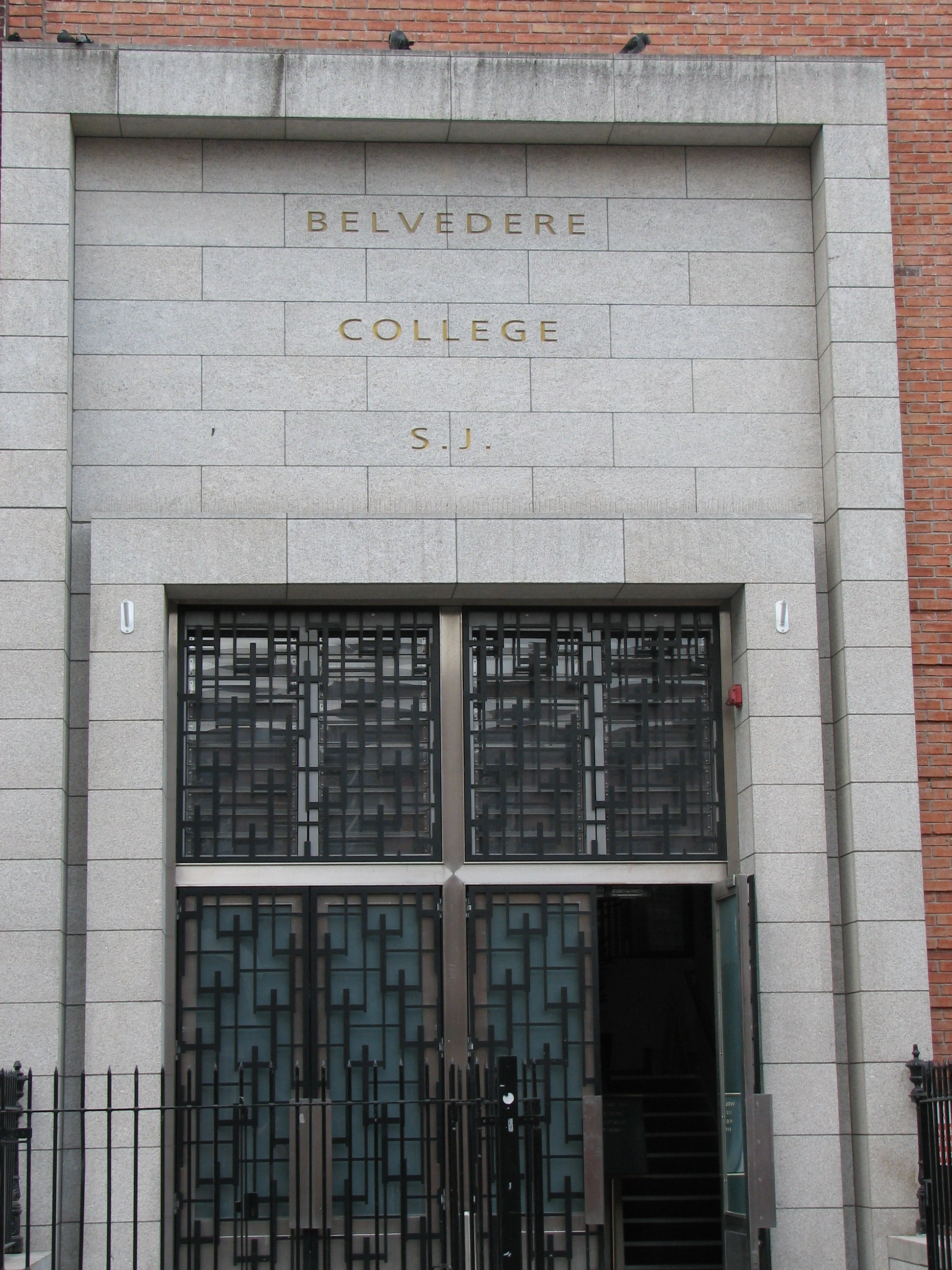
Belvedere College

Dillon Cosgrave mentions in his book North Dublin, City and County that there was once a private school situated at Number 2 which was run by Reverend George Wright and attended by Charles Lever, the novelist, and that the school were fierce competitors of another private school at Grenville Street.

At Number 3 was the home of the notorious judge John Toler, 1st Earl of Norbury, known as "The Hanging Judge".

It is now the home of several art and cultural organisations such as Fishamble: The New Play Company and the Olivier Cornet Gallery. The O'Reilly Theatre is situated on Great Denmark Street. Michael O'Donovan, Director of the National Concert Hall (2016–2019), was born in Number 15, the Belvedere Pharmacy.

=== Belvedere College ===
One of the most notable landmarks on the street is Belvedere House. It was built as a townhouse in 1775 for George Rochfort, 2nd Earl of Belvedere at a cost of £24,000. In 1841 it became a Jesuit college, Belvedere College. It is allegedly haunted by the ghost of Rochfort's mother, Mary Molesworth, 1st Lady of Belvedere, who died there.

As the college expanded in the 20th century, Georgian houses to the right of Belvedere House were demolished. In April 1968, the college published a planning application notice in newspapers with plans to demolish two houses to the left of the college due to "structural defects". Both had been listed for preservation, one having been the home of the 18th century stuccodore, Michael Stapleton, with a surviving interior from him. The same month, the houses were demolished prematurely and illegally. The houses were replaced with a pastiche extension designed by Jones and Kelly. The college demolished another Georgian house on the street, number 9, in 1982 as part of an extension to the school playground.
