= John Eccles (mayor) =

Anglo-Irish merchant and landowner

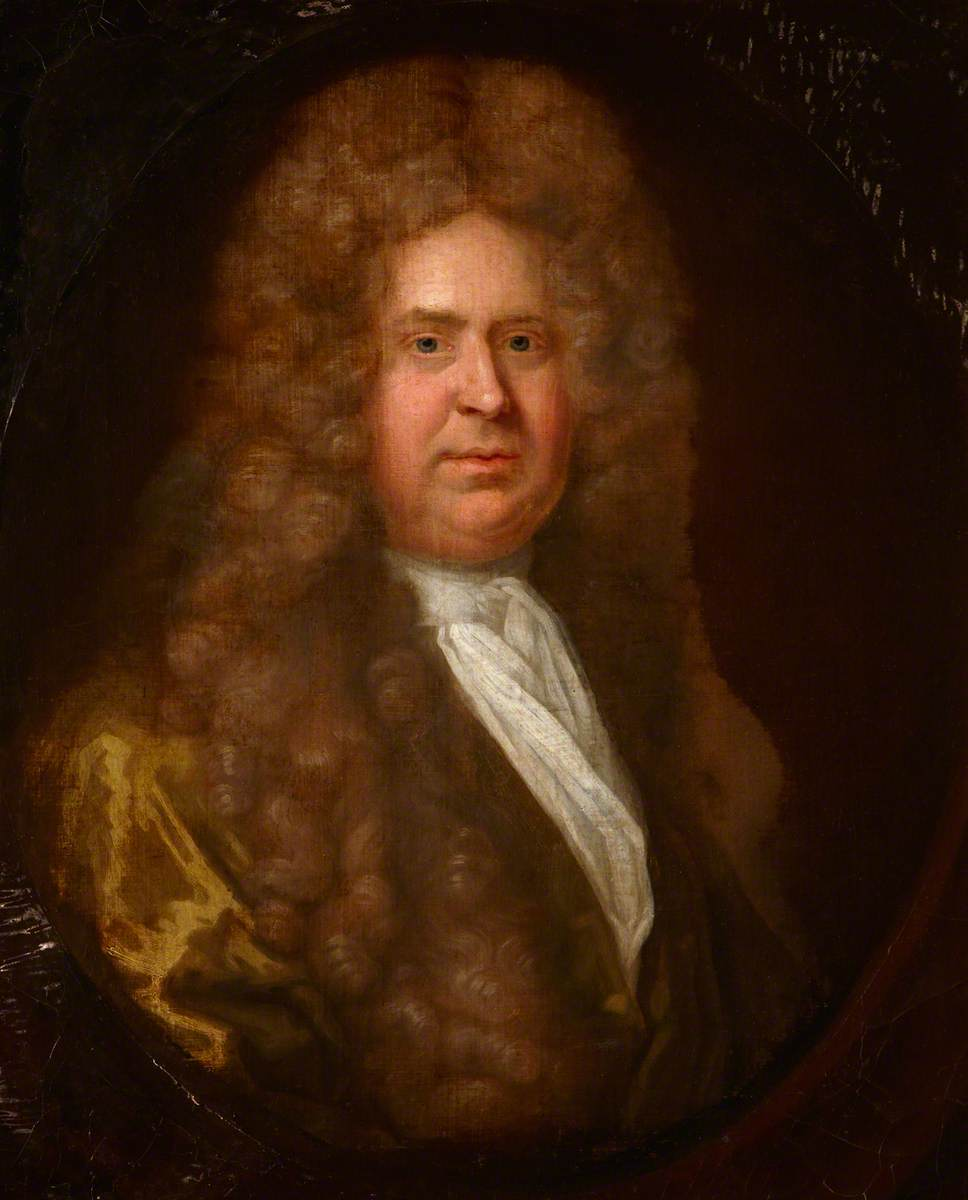
Sir John Eccles, from the portrait collection at Castle Ward

Sir John Eccles (c.1664 – 1727) was an Anglo-Irish merchant and landowner.

Eccles was the son of John Eccles of Malone, Belfast and Elizabeth Best of Hornby Castle, Lancashire. His father, a Protestant settler born in Scotland, had given shelter to William III of England during a storm prior to the Battle of the Boyne.

He was a merchant based in Dublin, and owned an extensive estate called "Mount Eccles" in the area that is now North Great George's Street. In 1710, he was appointed Lord Mayor of Dublin. On 16 November 1714 he was knighted at St James's Palace, London. Between 1725 and his death he was a justice of the peace for the city. He was patron of the Old Church of St George, Hill Street Dublin.

Eccles Street in Dublin was named in his honour.

Civic offices
Preceded by Charles Forrest	Lord Mayor of Dublin; 1710–1711	Succeeded by Ralph Gore
