= Michael Stapleton =

Irish plasterer, stuccodore and builder (1747–1801)

Michael Stapleton (1747 – 8 August 1801) is regarded as having been the most skilled stuccodore working in the neoclassical or "Adam" style that dominated Dublin interior decoration in the final decades of the 18th century.

== Life ==
Stapleton was born in Dublin, the son of George Stapleton, who may have been a plasterer by trade. He married Frances Todderick, the daughter of a Dublin timber merchant, in 1774. They lived for a few years in No. 59 Camden Street, until about 1781. Being a Catholic, he was not allowed to become a member of a Guild (this law was relaxed in 1793). In 1777 he was working on the Examination Hall at Dublin University (Trinity College). In 1784 he was working in Trinity College where some of the exceptional contributions he has made to stucco work are to be seen. The Stapletons had four children: Robert who died young; George took over the family business when his father died; Margaret married a stone-cutter called John Taylor; and Mary married into a family of paper-stainers and house painters.

The family moved to Mecklenburgh Street, then associated with those in the building trade. Stapleton associated with the master builder, Robert West, the progenitor of the Dublin School of Plasterwork of the 1760s. When West died Stapleton was his executor. He inherited his pattern books and both modelled himself on, and refined the style of, this central figure in the shaping of architecture and design in Dublin and in the country.

He died in 1801 and is buried at Malahide Abbey, just outside Dublin City. After his death his son George continued his work, a famous example being the Chapel Royal in Dublin Castle. Two of his grandchildren married members of the Conlan brewing family of Dublin.

== Architecture and Plaster work ==
Stapleton's name has become synonymous with the elegant ornamental plasterwork of the late 18th-century townhouse. His collection of decorative designs was presented to the National Library of Ireland in 1940 by the Friends of the National Collections of Ireland, which enabled previously unknown works by him to be identified. In connection with prominent Dublin buildings he was recorded by the Georgian Society Records (Dublin 1909–1913), and was credited with "much of the fine work in Dublin at this period". Sacheverell Sitwell commented that: "...the Dublin artisans (of the period) were second to none in Europe, and the reader need only glance through the volumes of the Georgian Society to feel certain of this." The first studies specifically devoted to Stapleton were published in articles by C. P. Curran in 1939–40, who added significantly to the canon of Stapleton's executed works.

Examples of Stapleton's include:

(All dates are approximate).

- Powerscourt House, 59, South William Street, Dublin. The most publicly available example of Stapleton's work can be seen by every shopper who visits there (1777–80).
- Belvedere House Belvedere College in Great Denmark Street, Dublin where generations of students have gazed upon Stapleton's work.

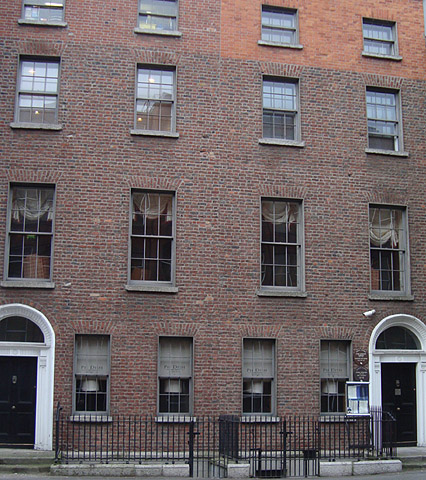
No. 4 Harcourt St. (on right), built by Stapleton

- Marlay House, Co. Dublin
- Lucan House, built around 1770 by Agmondisham Vesey, who had married into the family of Patrick Sarsfield (1776).
- Clonmel House, 16 & 17 Harcourt Street (1778).
- Belvedere House, Belvedere College S.J. for George Augustus Rochfort, 2nd Earl Belvedere (c. 1786).
- No. 9 Harcourt Street for Mr Edward Hill (1789–93).
- Nos. 16 and 17 St. Stephen's Green, Dublin. No. 17 for Joseph Leeson, 1st Earl Milltown (1778–80).
- Nos. 5, 6, 8 and 15 Ely Place, Dublin (No.5 for John La Touche).
- Mount Kennedy, Newtownmountkennedy, Co. Wicklow for Maj. Gen. Robert Cunninghame.
- Ardress House, Co. Armagh.
- Nos. 19, 20, 34, 35 and 43 North Great George's Street, Dublin
- Dublin University Trinity College, Dublin – The Examination Hall (1784) and Chapel (1787).
- Lord Miltown's withdrawing room (University Club, 17, St Stephen's Green).
- Lord Miltown's Dome room ceiling (16 or 17 St Stephen's Green).
- Lord Powerscourt's townhouse, Powerscourt House, South William Street (c.1778).
- Marquis of Downshire's dining parlour (Blessington House, Co. Wicklow) (1789) (burned 1798).
- Corke Abbey, Bray, Co. Wicklow for Col. Wingfield.
- Dunsany Castle.
- Roebuck House (1792).
- Stoyte House, St Patrick's College, Maynooth, Co. Kildare. (Stapleton's work now lost) (1796-1800).
- Chief Secretaries Lodge, Phoenix Park now Deerfield Residence, U.S. Ambassador's residence (1784).
- Lord Lieutenant's House, Phoenix Park now Áras an Uachtaráin, Irish President's residence (1782 + 1787).
- Ballinagall House, Westmeath.
- No. 40, Merrion Square.
- Bellevue, Delgany for Mrs. La Touche (1779).
- R.I.A.M., Westland Row (c. 1771).
- Nos. 32, 44, 52 & 53 (1771) St Stephen's Green.
- No. 18, Parnell Square (c.1765).
- No 1, Mountjoy Place.
- Nos. 39, 44 and 58, Mountjoy Square.
- Grenville Street house (1793).
- Rathmines home of Rev. Dr. Dalzac (1789).
- Cabinteely House

And there are many others.

== House-building ==
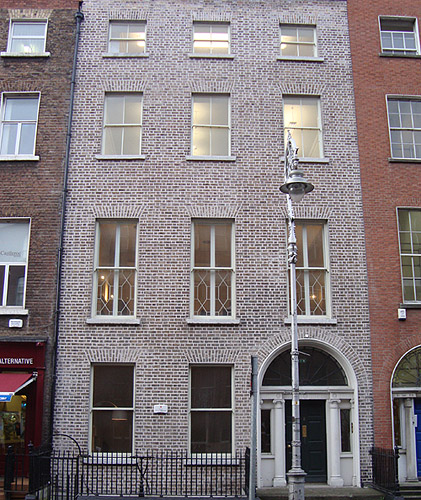
House built by Stapleton at 9 Harcourt Street, Dublin

Stapleton built a number of houses in Dublin. The only house to have survived the "vicissitudes of time and site redevelopment" (Lucey) is the present No. 9 Harcourt Street, built around 1785. He built two further houses on Harcourt Street, corresponding to Nos. 3 and 4 (the latter the birthplace of Edward Carson). He was among the first leaseholders in Luke Gardiner's development on Mountjoy Square. The houses he built and decorated to the highest standard corresponded to Nos. 43, 44 and 45 Mountjoy Square. These houses became part of the struggle in the 1970s between the Georgian Society, who wanted the houses restored, but had not the resources to do so, and developers led by Matt Gallagher, of the Gallagher Group, who wanted to demolish the houses to build offices. Without security or maintenance the houses fell into a state of decay and for safety reasons Dublin Corporation had to demolish them.

He spent the last years of his life in a house he had built at No. 1 Mountjoy Place. This house was illegally demolished by the Jesuit owners of Belvedere College, although it was under a preservation order, on 26 April 1968. The carved ceilings and other works of Stapleton were destroyed. After protests by the Dublin Civic Group and others, Dublin Corporation immediately called a halt to the demolition work, but by then it was too late.

Stapleton's will (proved in 1801) listed his profession as "builder", suggesting that house-building had become an important part of his career. He would have co-operated with his brother-in-law, Thomas Todderick, with whom he had qualified, and the plasterer Andrew Callnan in various developments.

== House Ownership ==
Nos. 7 & 8 Mountjoy Square North.

No. 1 Mountjoy place.

== References and sources ==
=== Sources ===
- Lucey, Conor (2007). The Stapleton Collection: Designs for the Irish neoclassical interior. Tralee: Churchill Press. ISBN 978-0-9550246-2-7.
- Sitwell, Sacheverell (1945). British Architects and Craftsmen: a survey of taste, design, and style during three centuries, 1600–1830. London: Batsford.
- Curran, C. P. (1967). Dublin Decorative Plasterwork of the Seventeenth and Eighteenth Centuries. London.
- Curran, C. P. (1 September 1939). "Michael Stapleton: Dublin Stuccodore". Studies: An Irish Quarterly Review. 28 (111). Dublin: Messenger Publications: 439–449. JSTOR 30097752.
