= Old Church of St George, Hill Street Dublin =

Former protestant church in Dublin, Ireland

Old Church of St. George
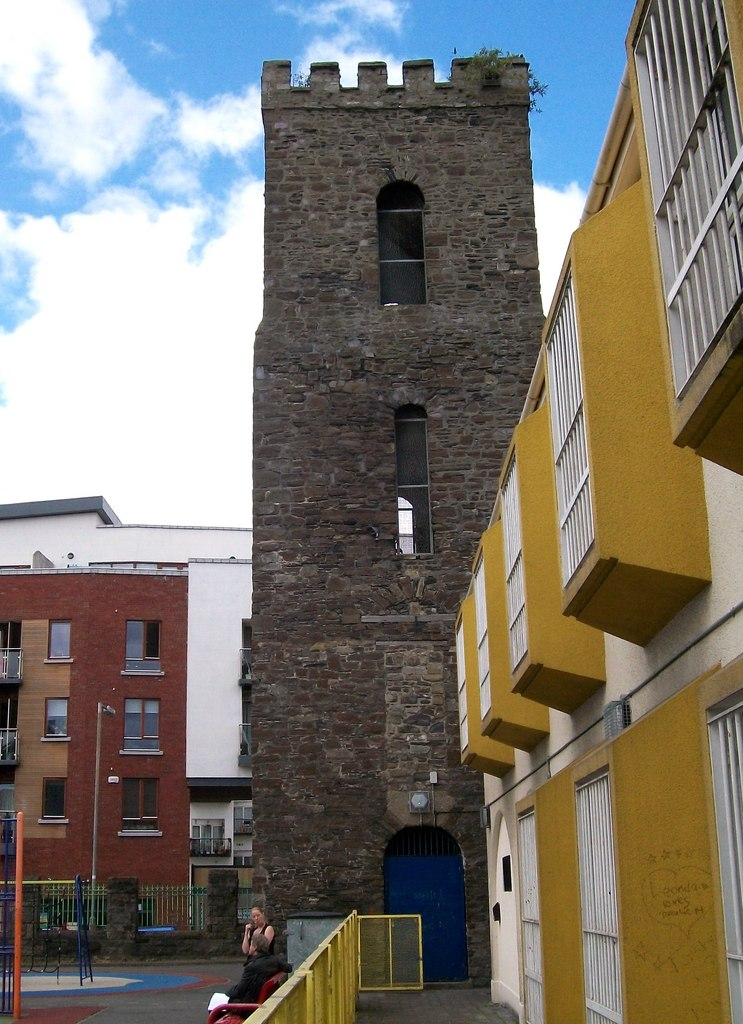
- The tower of the former St George's Church
- Old Church of St. George
- 53°21′16″N 6°15′30″W
- Location: Dublin, Ireland

Architecture
- Groundbreaking: 1668
- Demolished: 1894

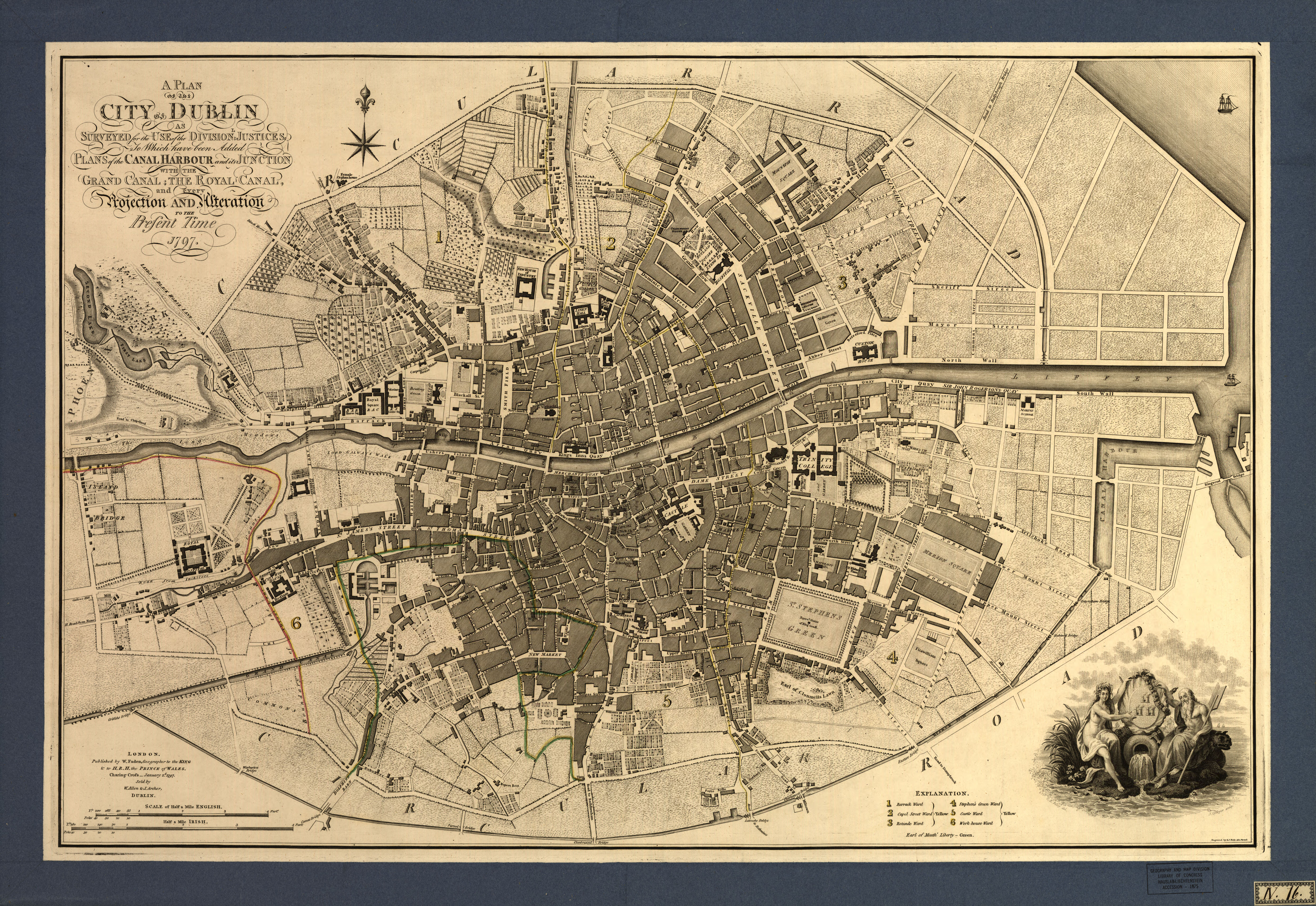
1797 map of Dublin

The Old Church of St. George, commonly called "Little George's" in Hill Street (formerly Temple Street Lower) Parish of St. Mary, Dublin was built in 1668 by the Eccles family for their workmen and also as a chapel-of-ease to a nearby St. Mary's Church. However, that St. Mary's Church was not St. Mary's Church, Dublin as that church’s foundation stone was laid in 1700, and it was not St. Mary's Abbey, Dublin as that was dissolved in 1539. Therefore St George's Church, Hill Street, may have been a Chapel-of-Ease to St. Michan's Church in Church Street. The main body of the church, with the exception of the tower, was demolished in 1894.

Following the decision to build a new chapel the congregation moved to a temporary chapel on Whitworth Road 1793 before the new St. George's Church, Dublin was built on Hardwick Place, (Upper) Temple Street. The Old St. George, St. George's Chapel, sometimes called Little St. Georges was used as an Episcopal Chapel for a time.

== Church tower ==
The tower of the old church is now considered to be in Dublin city but in the past, it was probably said to be in the Drumcondra area, the same as the "New Church". The tower of the church is now classed as a "Protected Structure". The entrance was below an old square steeple or tower, about 40 feet in height. The interior of the tower is small and was adorned with a few monuments. The communion table was in a recess at the eastern end lit by a large circular-headed window, with a monument to the memory of Lady Galbraith on its south side. In the west over the entrance was a small, badly lit gallery.

== Burials ==
- Richard Kirwan died in June 1812 aged 79 years and was buried in Old St George Church, where Mr. Pope, his butler, was buried a few years later in the same grave.
- Francis Tempest Brady, the father of Maziere Brady, the Lord Chancellor of Ireland, was also buried in the grave-yard of Old St George.
- Charles Osborne, judge of the Court of King's Bench (Ireland), who lived on nearby Temple Street, died suddenly of typhus in September 1817 aged 57, and was buried in the grave-yard.
