= College Green, Dublin =

Plaza in Dublin, Ireland

College Green
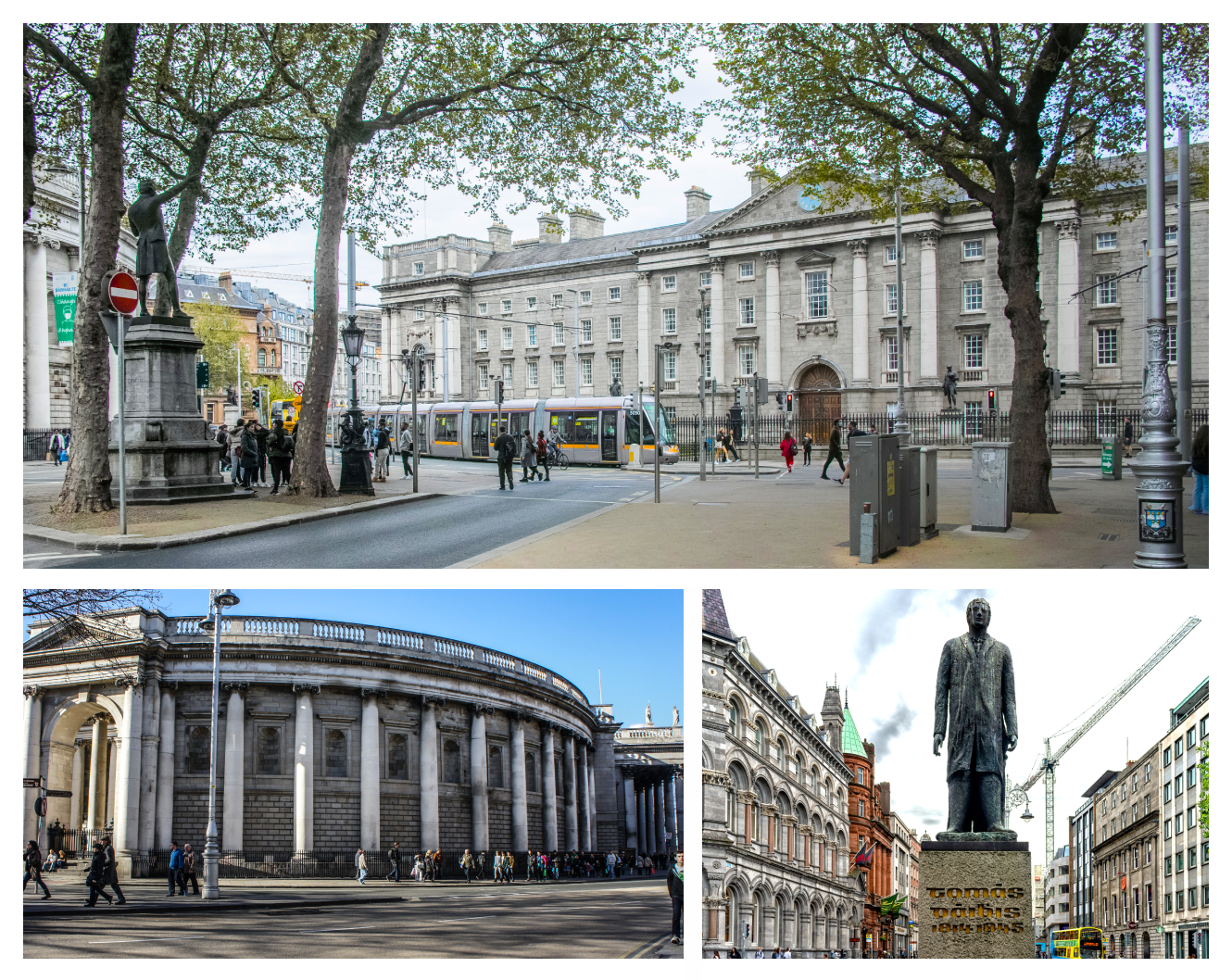
- Clockwise from top: Trinity College Dublin as seen from College Green; the Thomas Davis statue; Bank of Ireland, College Green

- Location within Central Dublin
- Native name: Faiche an Choláiste (Irish)
- Namesake: Trinity College Dublin
- Length: 260 m (850 ft)
- Width: 38 metres (125 ft)
- Location: Dublin, Ireland
- Postal code: D02
- Coordinates: 53°20′40″N 6°15′36″W
- west end: Dame Street
- east end: Trinity College, Westmoreland Street, College Street

Other
- Known for: Trinity College, restaurants, nightclubs, statues

College Green (Irish: Faiche an Choláiste) is a three-sided plaza in the centre of Dublin, Ireland. On its northern side is the Bank of Ireland building, which until 1800 was Ireland's Parliament House. To its east stands Trinity College Dublin. To its south stands a series of 19th-century buildings.

Streets leading onto College Green are Dame Street to the west, Grafton Street to the south, Westmoreland Street to the north and College Street to the northeast. College Green has been used as an assembly point for major political rallies. In the mid-1990s, United States President Bill Clinton addressed a crowd during his visit to Ireland. President Barack Obama also spoke at the site in a major address during his visit in May 2011.

== Location ==
College Green is on Dublin's Southside, and is about 170m long. Its western end is a continuation of Dame Street. At its eastern end, facing Trinity College, it meets Westmoreland Street heading north, College Street heading northeast, and Grafton Street heading south. The Temple Bar district is to the north.

== History and layout ==
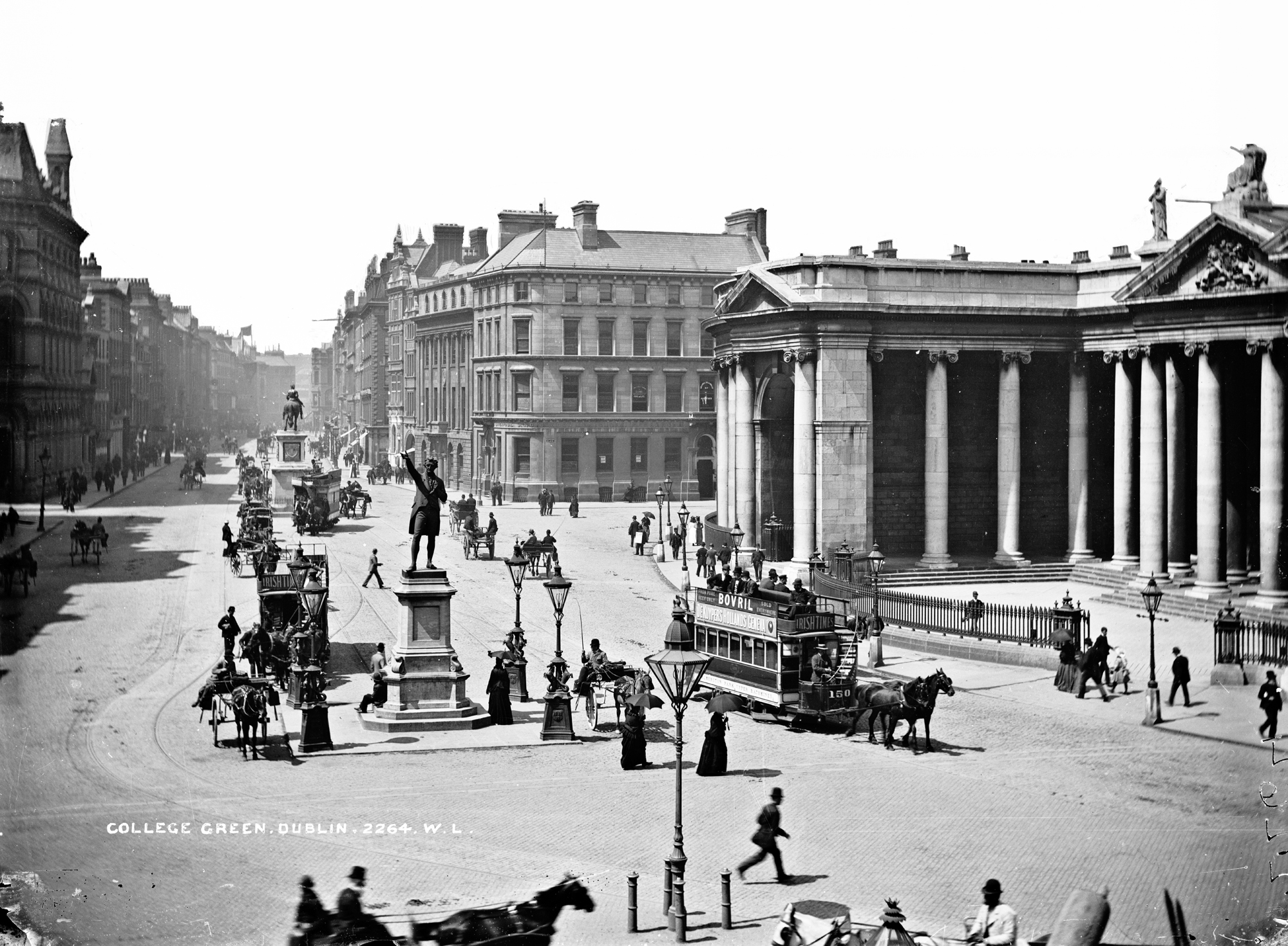
College Green circa 1890

The area was once known as Hoggen Green and named after the nunnery of Blessed Virgin Mary del Hogges constructed at this location in 1156 by Diarmaid mac Murchadha. The name "Hoggen" derives from the Old Norse word haugr meaning mound, or barrow.

Between Church Lane and Suffolk Street, the Hiberno-Norse held their Thing, an assembly and meeting place, which was still to be seen in the 17th century. All along College Green, called Hoggen Green by the English, lay their barrows. Hoggen gave its name to the convent of St Mary de Hogges, which stood roughly where the Bank of Ireland is now and was a major landowner in the area until the Reformation. Originally laid out as a triangular green, it is now a rough trapezoid. The site has been historically used in celebration, with newly appointed Viceroys of Ireland being welcomed on the street.

Trinity College was founded on the street's east side in 1592. The west front's facade was designed by Theodore Jacobsen and added in 1751, funded partially by government duties on tobacco imported from slave plantations in the West Indies. Several public monuments stand in College Green, including a 19th-century statue facing the college of old Irish Parliament member Henry Grattan, designed by John Henry Foley.

By the time Charles Brooking published his map of Dublin in 1728, College Green had developed from a rural thoroughfare and properties had been built on both sides of the street.

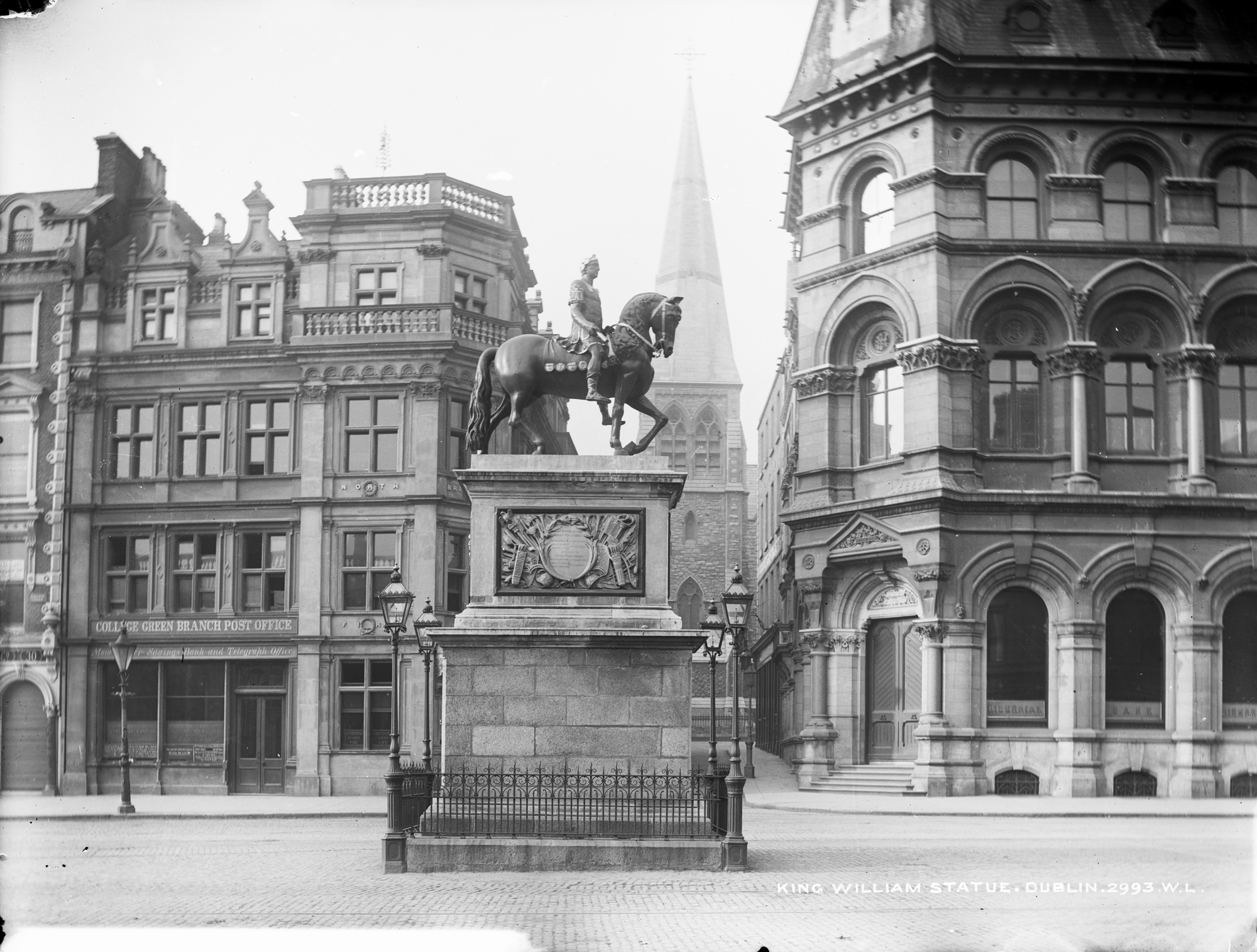
Statue of William of Orange on College Green, erected in 1701. It was severely damaged in an explosion in 1928, and removed in 1929.

A statue of King William III of England on horseback was constructed in the centre of College Green in 1701 by Grinling Gibbons. The statue was historically the site of celebrations marking the King's birthday on 4 November, with a procession through the city and a parade around the statue. These celebrations during the age of the Whig single party state were recorded by Mary Delany, who wrote that the King was "idolized here almost to superstition." After the formation of the ultra-Whig Orange Order in 1795 and the Rebellion of 1798, the statue became a target for the fervour of both sides. The statue was routinely decorated with orange ribbons and lilies, with the railings painted orange, but it was also frequently defaced, painted with pitch and there was one attempt to remove the head.

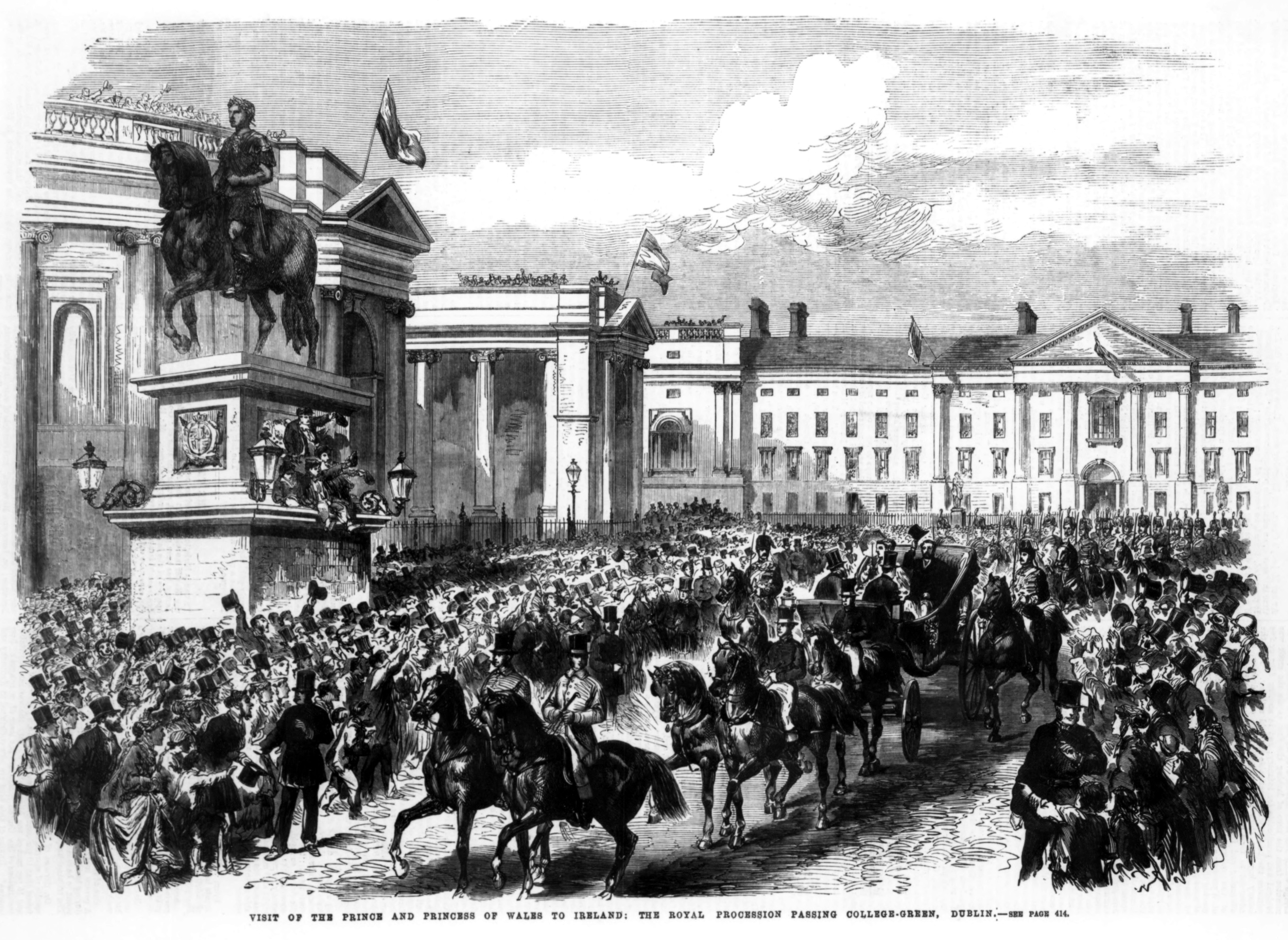
Illustration of royal procession going past College Green, 1868

The engraving "Visit of the Prince and Princess of Wales to Ireland: The Royal Procession passing College-Green, Dublin" published in the 25 April 1868 issue of The Illustrated London News depicted a group of children who had climbed up to the pedestal of the statue of William III to get a better view.

The statue is also featured in James Joyce's story "The Dead". The statue continued to be attacked and defaced numerous times through the 19th and 20th centuries, leading to many repairs. The annual parades and processions ceased in 1823. It was eventually taken down after 277 years when it was badly damaged in an explosion on 11 November 1928, Armistice Day, with the head having been stolen in 1929. The area was the temporary site of an air raid shelter during World War II.

In 1966, a statue of the poet and nationalist Thomas Davis was constructed in the centre of College Green, to mark the fiftieth anniversary of the Easter Rising. The design includes a fountain designed by Edward Delaney, featuring four figures with trumpets which represent the four provinces of Ireland.

== Architecture ==
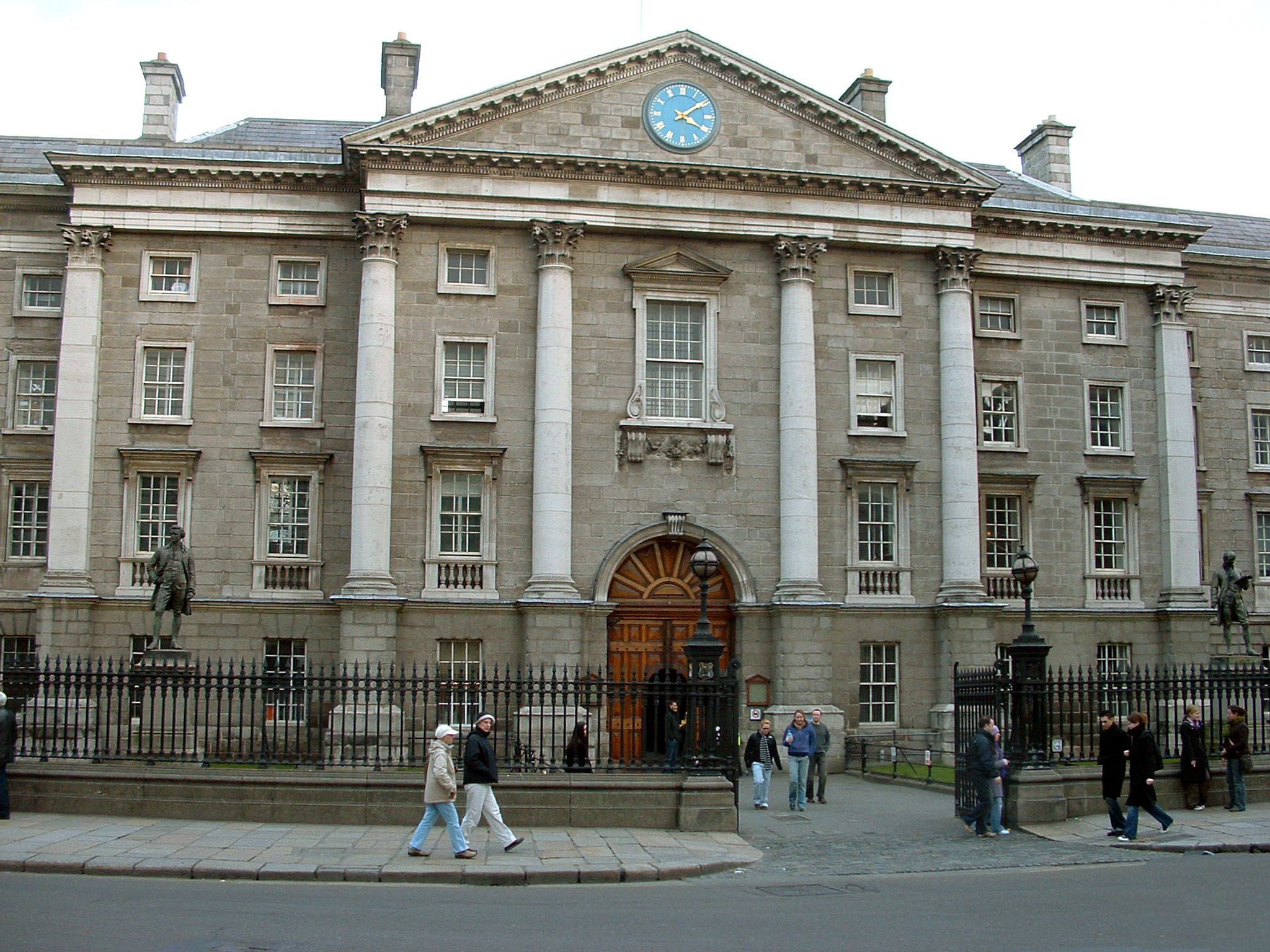
Trinity College faces onto College Green

Chichester House was constructed by Arthur Chichester, 1st Baron Chichester in the early 17th century. It was subsequently adapted for the Irish Parliament around 1670, and replaced by a new Parliament House in 1729, designed by Edward Lovett Pearce. It was later enlarged by James Gandon in 1787 and Edward Parke between 1804 and 1808. The site is now the Bank of Ireland.

Daly's Club, a gambling house and club founded by Patrick Daly in 1750, moved to the space on College Green between Foster Place and Anglesea Street at numbers 2–5 in 1769. It closed in 1823. The buildings were renovated in 1870, with two additional stories added. The centre portion is now taken up by shops.

Number 6-8 was formerly the site of the Jury's Hotel. It opened in 1839 as a commercial lodging house and was rebuilt in 1859 and 1882. The premises was sold when Jury's relocated to Ballsbridge. The contents were auctioned, with the ornate mahogany bar sold to a buyer in Zurich. The site was bought by Patrick Gallagher in July 1979, who demolished the hotel in 1980 and built a granite-clad office block designed by Burke-Kennedy Doyle and Partners in its place, which was used by Telecom Éireann. The remodelled building now forms part of the Central Plaza development by Hines.

The Ulster Bank headquarters on College Green was built in the late 1970s. Despite objections from groups like the Dublin Civic Group, a collection of mostly Victorian buildings which faced onto College Green, Suffolk Street and Church Lane were demolished in 1976 to make way for the new development. The high-domed Victorian façade on College Green was kept, but the interior was entirely remodelled.

Guinness Mahon moved from South Frederick Street to numbers 16–17 in 1854. The current building was constructed in 1931 by G&T Crampton for the Bank. The Bank subsequently moved to St Stephen's Green.

== Politics ==
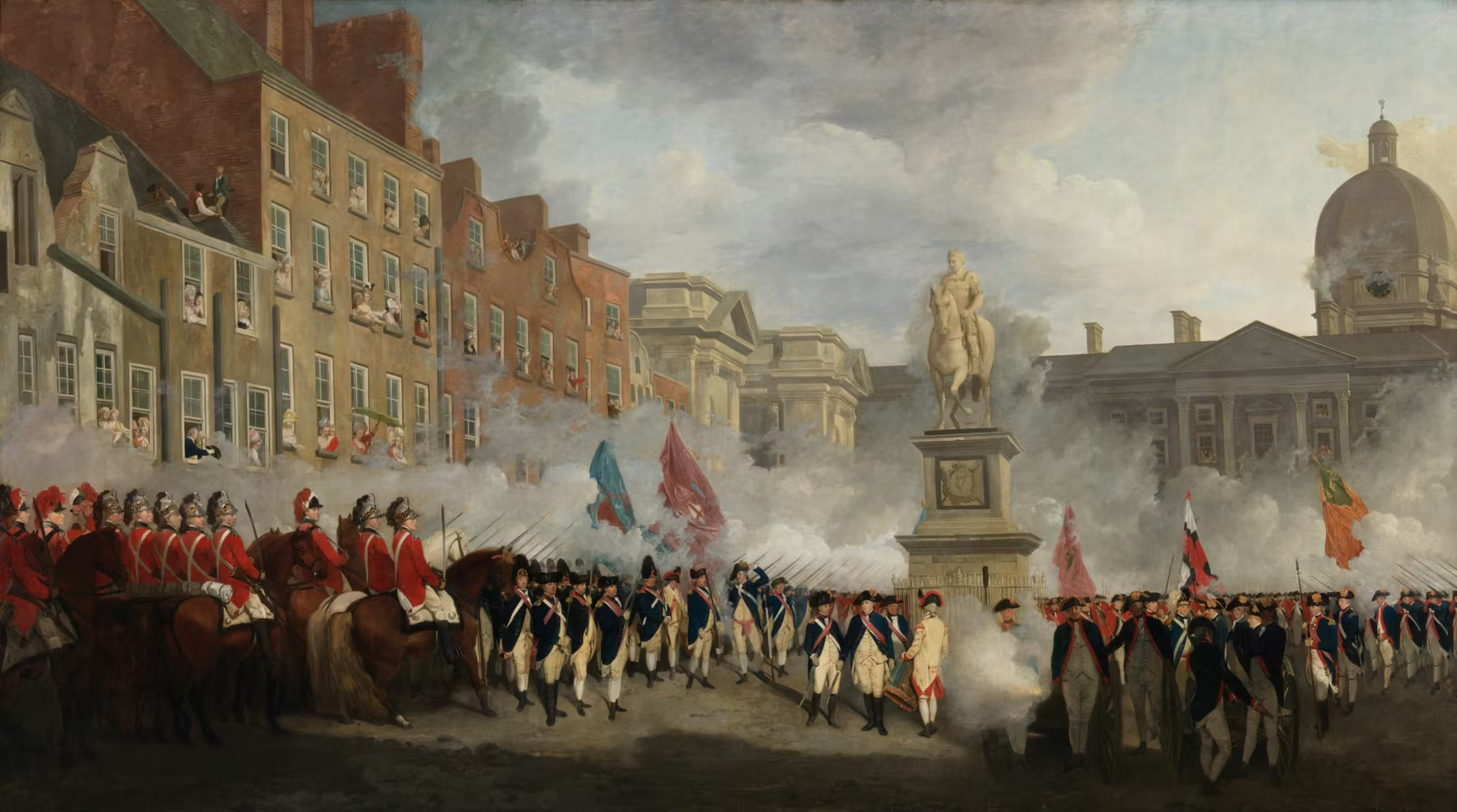
The Dublin Volunteers on College Green by Francis Wheatley, 1779–1780

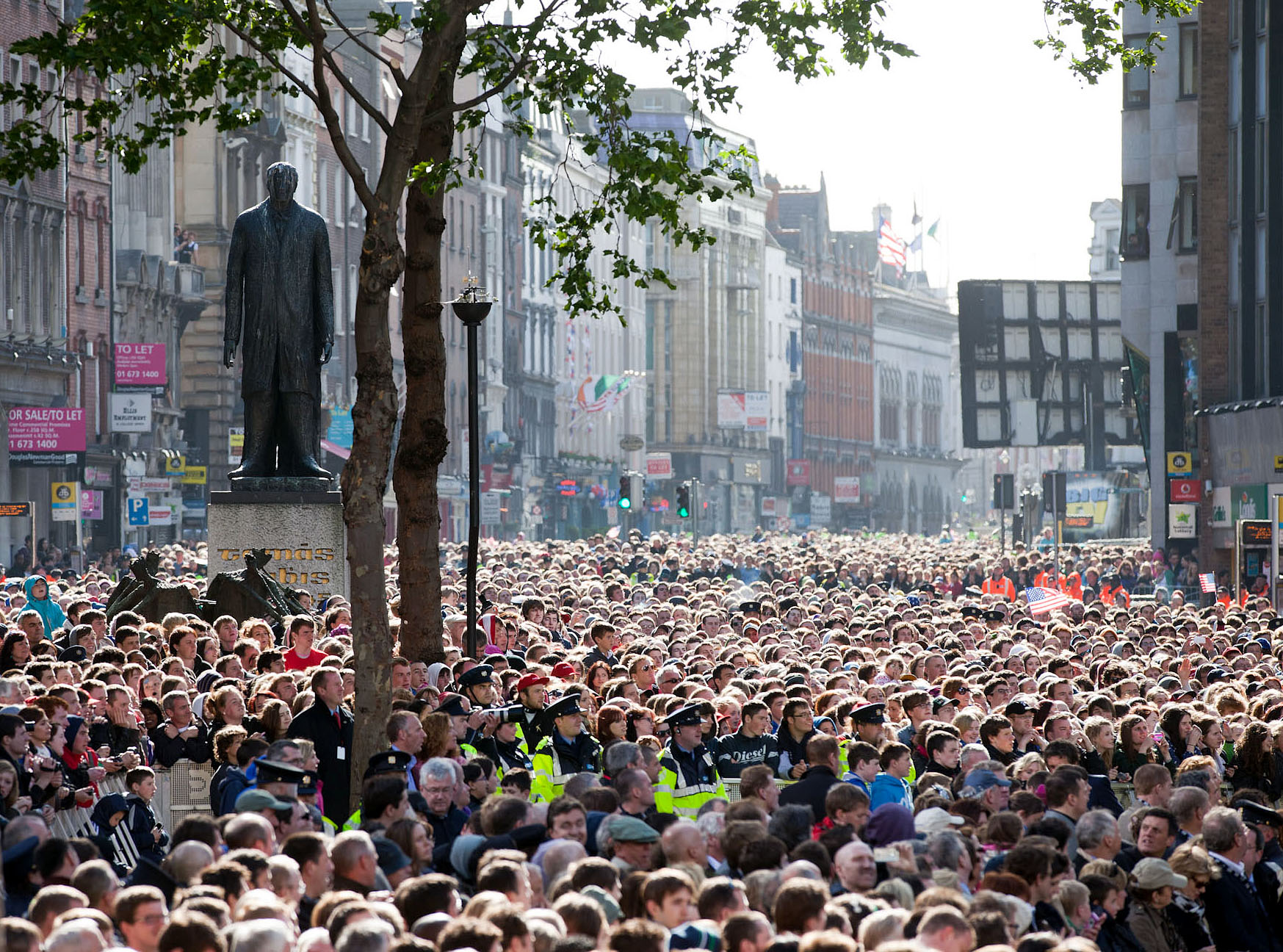
Crowds gather on College Green to see U.S. President Barack Obama in 2011.

College Green is commemorated in Francis Wheatley's painting The Dublin Volunteers on College Green, which shows the Irish Volunteers demonstrating for legislative independence on 4 November 1779.

Bill Clinton, the President of the United States visited Dublin in December 1995 and gave a speech in College Green to 80,000 people. In May 2011, President Barack Obama gave a speech at College Green in front of 100,000. During the speech, he praised Ireland for its economic opportunities, and said he was proud of his Moneygall heritage.

== Traffic restriction ==
Since July 2009, College Green, during peak times on working days, has been accessible only to pedestrians, buses, taxis and cyclists. This increased to all times in May 2023.

In 2009 Celtcia provided Ciaran Cuffe with a concept proposal for College Green Plaza. Later as head of the transport committee he would not allow the this proposal the Greenest College Green Plaza to be presented to Dublin City Council transport committee.

In 2016, plans were published for College Green to be fully pedestrianised, apart from a public-transport lane along the Trinity College side, to create a large public space in front of the Bank of Ireland. Dublin City Council announced that a joint team of Dixon Jones and Paul Keogh Architects would be responsible for redesigning the space. The plans drew several protests from store owners, taxi drivers and bus operators. In October 2018 An Bord Pleanála, the state planning agency rejected the plan. The Green Party-led Dublin City Council banned traffic for three Sundays in summer 2019 in order to test the feasibility of further traffic restrictions.

== See also ==
- Statues in Dublin
- List of streets and squares in Dublin
- Dublin College Green (constituency)
