= The Dublin Volunteers on College Green =

Painting by Francis Wheatley

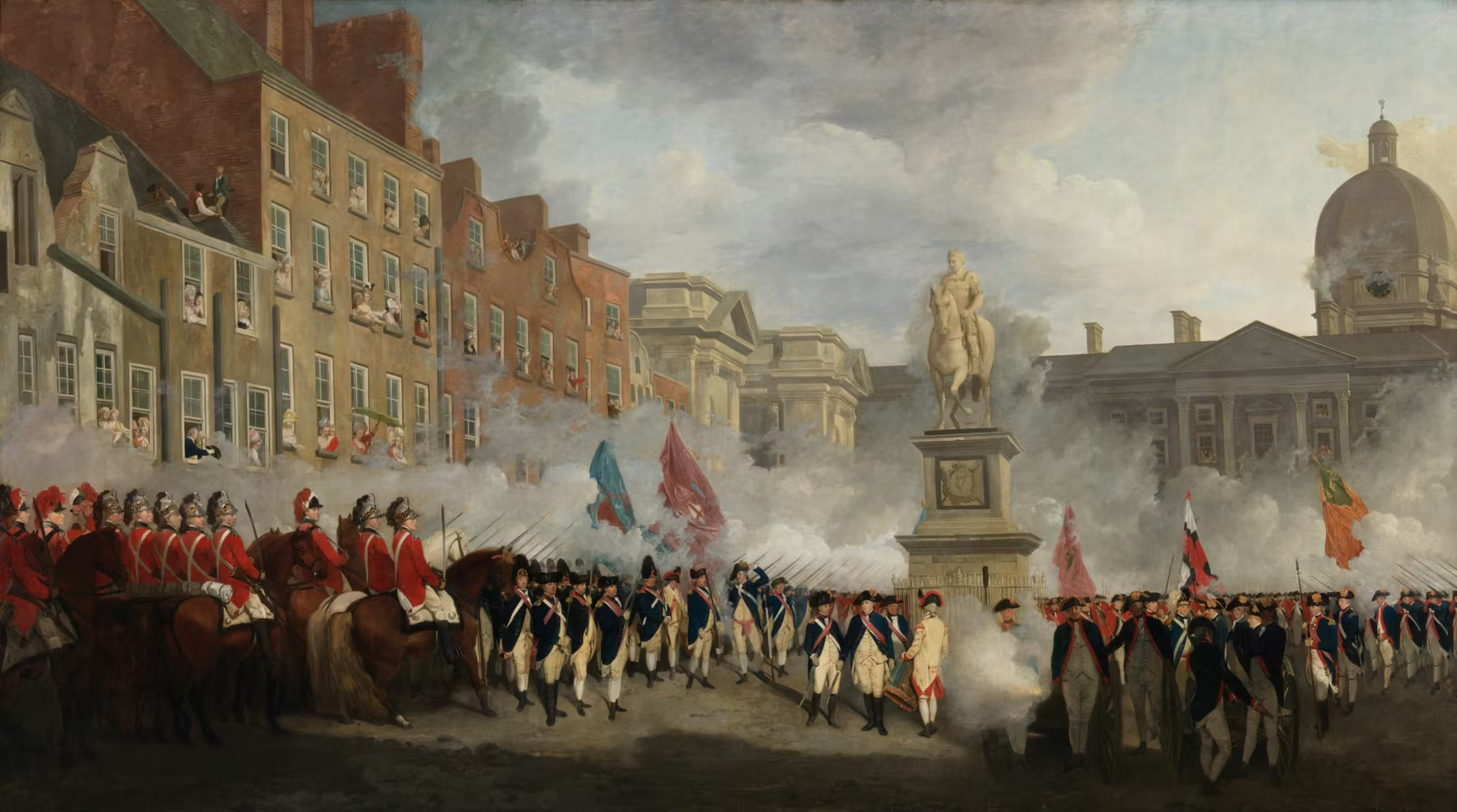
- Artist: Francis Wheatley
- Year: 1779–1780
- Type: Oil on canvas, history painting
- Dimensions: 175 cm × 323 cm (69 in × 127 in)
- Location: National Gallery of Ireland, Dublin

The Dublin Volunteers on College Green is a 1779–1780 history painting by the English artist Francis Wheatley. It depicts a scene on the 4 November 1779. To commemorate the birthday of William III of England roughly 1,000 Irish Volunteers paraded on College Green, Dublin close to the statue of William. They are shown firing their muskets in salute.

Following the threat of invasion during the American War of Independence, a large military volunteer movement was formed to supplement the Irish Army. Although primarily led by Protestant Patriots, it also attracted many Catholic recruits. Although loyal to the crown, the volunteers became a force to pressure the government in London to give greater powers to the Parliament of Ireland which was granted in 1782 as Grattan's Parliament. Wheatley was in Ireland after fleeing London to escape his creditors. While in Dublin he also produced The Irish House of Commons, a notable depiction of the Irish Parliament. It is equally notable as one of the few artistic depictions of Richard Cassel's Bell Tower inside Trinity College Dublin, a massive structure torn down in the late 1700s and a precursor to the later iconic Campanile.

The work was displayed at the exhibition of the Irish Society of Artists in 1760. The painting is today in the National Gallery of Ireland in Dublin, having been acquired through a gift from the Duke of Leinster in 1891.

== Bibliography ==
- Higgins, Padhraig. A Nation of Politicians: Gender, Patriotism, and Political Culture in Late Eighteenth-Century Ireland University of Wisconsin Press, 2010.
- Kilfeather, Siobhán Marie. Dublin: A Cultural History. Oxford University Press, 2005/
- Usher, Robin. Protestant Dublin, 1660-1760: Architecture and Iconography. Springer, 2012.
