= Edward Jones (English architect) =

English architect (born 1939)

Edward Jones CBE RIBA
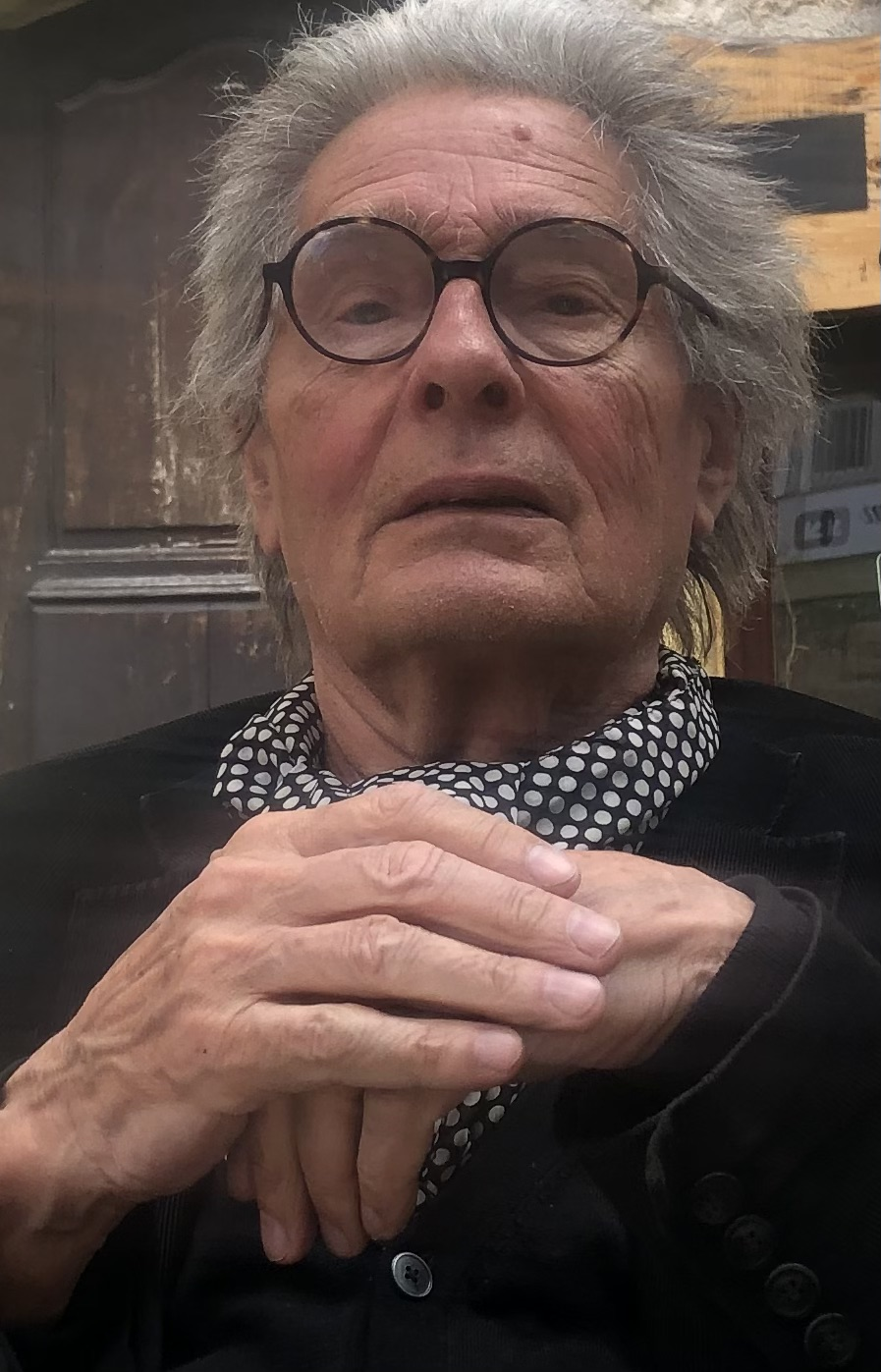
- Jones in 2022
- Born: Edward David Brynmor Jones; 20 October 1939 (age 86); St Albans, Hertfordshire, England
- Education: Architectural Association
- Occupation: Architect
- Practice: Dixon Jones
- Buildings: Royal Opera House; Saïd Business School; National Portrait Gallery

Edward David Brynmor Jones CBE RIBA (born 20 October 1939) is an English architect. He is a partner of the architectural practice Dixon Jones.

== Biography ==
=== Early life ===
Edward Jones was born in St Albans, England on 20 October 1939. After schooling at Haileybury and Imperial Service College, Jones trained at the Architectural Association, where he met his future architectural partner Jeremy Dixon. They formed an informal practice in the mid sixties, which Sir Peter Cook referred to as "The Grunt Group" to promote the modernist agenda.

=== Career ===
Jones has been professor of architecture in Europe and North America including UCD Dublin, Royal College of Art, the Architectural Association, and Universities of Toronto, Princeton, Harvard, Cornell, Rice.

He was in private practice from 1973 to 1989 in London and in Toronto, Ontario, Canada. In 1989 he co-founded the architectural practice Jeremy Dixon Edward Jones with Jeremy Dixon, called Dixon Jones since 2003. In 1973 the pair came to the attention of the national press when their 'Great Pyramid' competition-winning scheme for Northamptonshire County Hall was exhibited in London.

In 2000, The Observer listed two of his practice's London buildings in the Top 10 Buildings of the Year: the National Portrait Gallery and the Royal Opera House. From 2002 to 2010 he was honorary professor at University of Cardiff. In 2001 he received an Honorary Doctorate from University of Portsmouth, and an Honorary Fellowship from University of Cardiff, and in December 2010 he received a CBE for services to architecture.

National Life Stories conducted an oral history interview (C467/98) with Edward Jones in 2011 for its Architects Lives' collection held by the British Library. Also in 2011, Jones was made an Honorary Fellow of the Royal Institute of the Architects of Ireland.

=== Personal life ===
Jones is married to Canadian architect Margot Griffin.

== Major projects ==
- Mississauga Civic Centre, Canada (1987)
- Darwin College Study Centre, Cambridge University (1993)
- National Portrait Gallery, London (2000)
- Royal Opera House, London (1999)
- Somerset House Masterplan, London (2001)
- Saïd Business School, Oxford (2001)
- Villa Jones, France (2001)
- Kings Place, London (2008)
- Exhibition Road Masterplan (2011)
- Quadrant 3 for the Crown Estate, London (2006–2011)
- Masterplan for Chelsea Barracks, London (2010–2012)
- Olympic Way Steps, Wembley Park, London (2016–2021)

== Publications ==
- Edward Jones and Christopher Woodward, A Guide to the Architecture of London (Weidenfeld and Nicolson) 1983, 4th edition 2009 ISBN 0-297-85516-6
- DIXON JONES, Right Angle Publishing Ltd, 2002. ISBN 0-9532848-2-4
