= Jeremy Dixon =

British architect

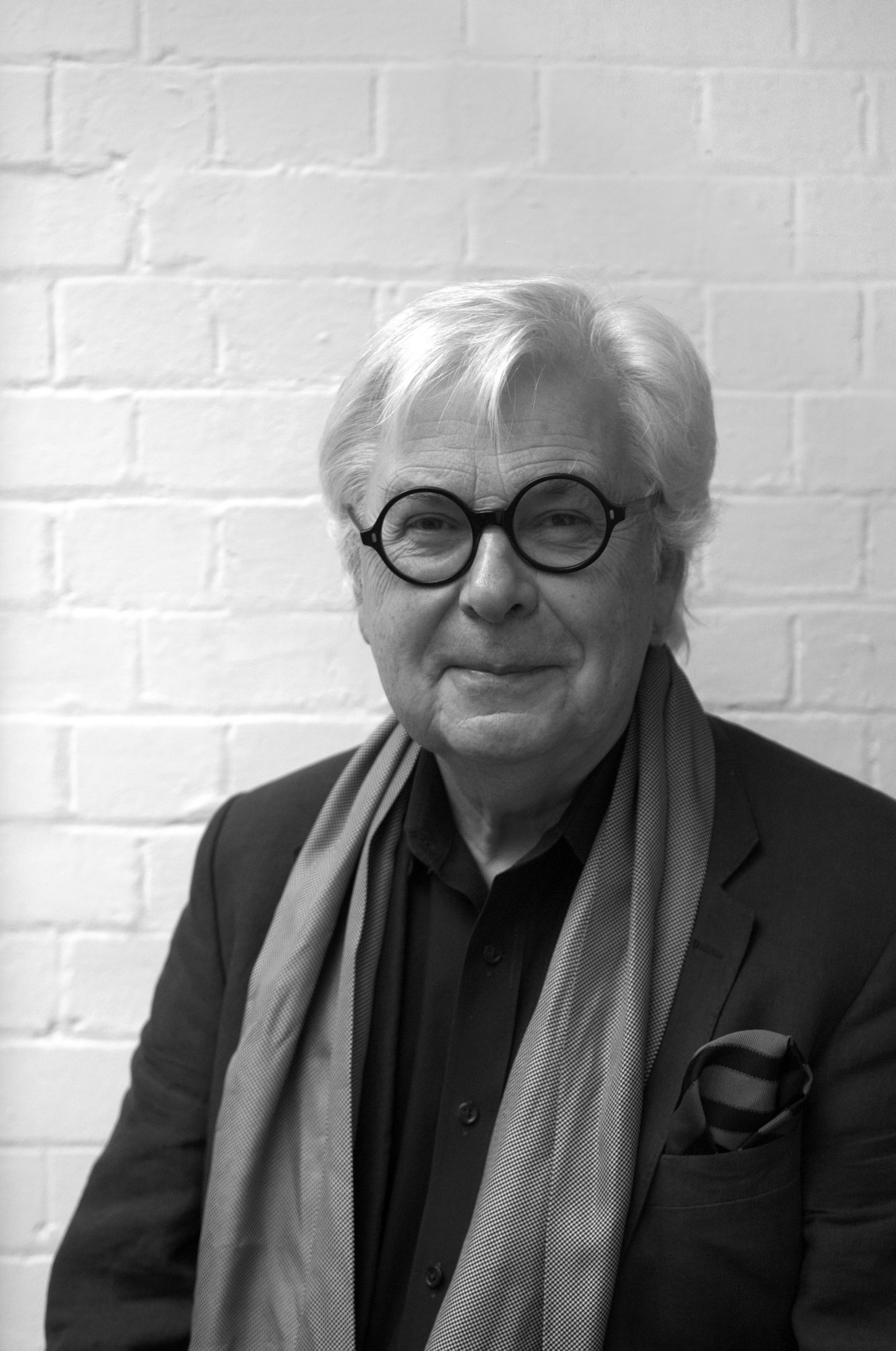
Dixon in 2015

Sir David Jeremy Dixon (born 31 May 1939) is a British architect and was a principal of the London practice Dixon Jones until its closure in 2020.

== Career ==
Following school days at Merchant Taylors' School, Northwood, Dixon was trained at the Architectural Association. There, he met, in the same year group, his future wife and working partner, Fenella Clemens.

In 1973, they won together the competition for the Northamptonshire County Offices (assisted by Edward Jones) and were responsible for a number of London projects, mostly housing, including the terrace of dwellings at 105–123 St Mark's Road. In partnership with Bill Jack of BDP, they won the Royal Opera House competition in 1984.

The Dixon/Clemens working association lasted until 1989 when Dixon was joined by Edward Jones, initially to complete the Royal Opera House. The new practice went on to complete a series of cultural and university projects including the National Portrait Gallery, The National Gallery, Said Business School and Exhibition Road together with projects that combine commercial and cultural functions such as Kings Place and Quadrant 3. More recently the practice has been involved with residential developments including the masterplan for Chelsea Barracks.

Most of the work is located in London and both Dixon and Jones have a particular interest in the history and evolution of cities and in particular London. The work generally speaking takes account of the historical context as an approach to creating buildings on sensitive urban sites. He was knighted in the 2000 New Year Honours.

National Life Stories conducted an oral history interview (C467/91) with Jeremy Dixon in 2009 for its Architects Lives' collection held by the British Library.

He co-authored, with Edward Jones, the book Buildings & Projects 1959-2002, published in 2002.

== Personal life ==
Dixon was married to Fenella Clemens until they separated in 1989. They had three children. He is now in a long term relationship with Julia Somerville. He lives in London.

== Projects ==
- Reconstruction of the Tatlin Tower – Hayward Gallery London 1971-1972
- Northamptonshire County Offices (unbuilt first prize) 1973
- Housing St Marks Road – London 1975-1979
- Tate Gallery coffee shop and restaurant – Millbank London 1981 -1984
- Royal Opera House – Covent Garden London 1984 -1999
- Henry Moore Institute – Leeds 1988 – 1993
- Darwin College Study Centre – Cambridge 1989 – 1994
- Venice Bus Station (unbuilt first prize) 1990
- Sainsburys Superstore – Plymouth 1991 – 1994
- National Portrait Gallery – London 1994 – 2000
- Somerset House – London 1998 – 2000
- Saïd Business School – Oxford 1998 – 2012
- Kings Place – London 2002 – 2008
- Exhibition Road – London 2003 – 2012
- Quadrant 3 for The Crown Estate – London 2006 – 2011
- Masterplan for Chelsea Barracks – London 2010 - 2012
- Reconstruction of the Tatlin Tower – Royal Academy London 2011 – 2012
