= 105–123 St Mark's Road =

Grade II listed houses

Coordinates: 51°31′11″N 0°13′05″W

105–123 St Mark's Road in the London Borough of Kensington, are Grade II listed houses with Historic England. They were built between 1977 and 1979 and designed by Jeremy and Fenella Dixon.
