= Francis Wheatley (painter) =

English painter

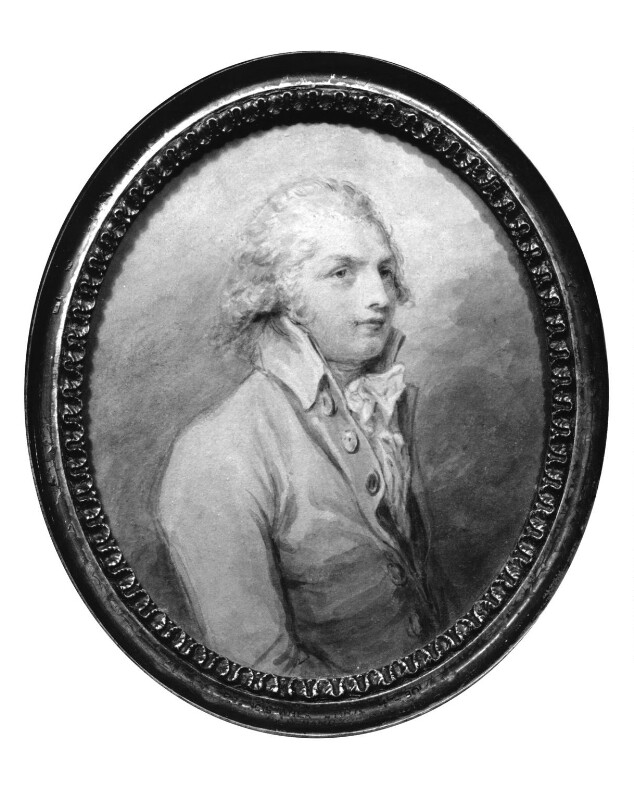
1785 portrait of Wheatley by William Hamilton

Francis Wheatley RA (1747 – 28 June 1801) was an English painter who specialised in portrait painting and landscape art.

== Life and work ==
Wheatley was born at Wild Court, Covent Garden, London, the son of a master tailor. He studied at William Shipley's drawing school and the Royal Academy, and won several prizes from the Society of Arts. He assisted in the decoration of Vauxhall, and aided John Hamilton Mortimer in painting a ceiling for Lord Melbourne at Brocket Hall in Hertfordshire.

In his youth, he lived a dissipated life. He first exhibited at the Royal Academy in 1778, built up a good practice and was praised by the critics. But he fell in with extravagant company and was forced to flee his creditors: so he eloped to Ireland with Elizabeth Gresse, wife of a fellow artist John Alexander Gresse (1741–1794).

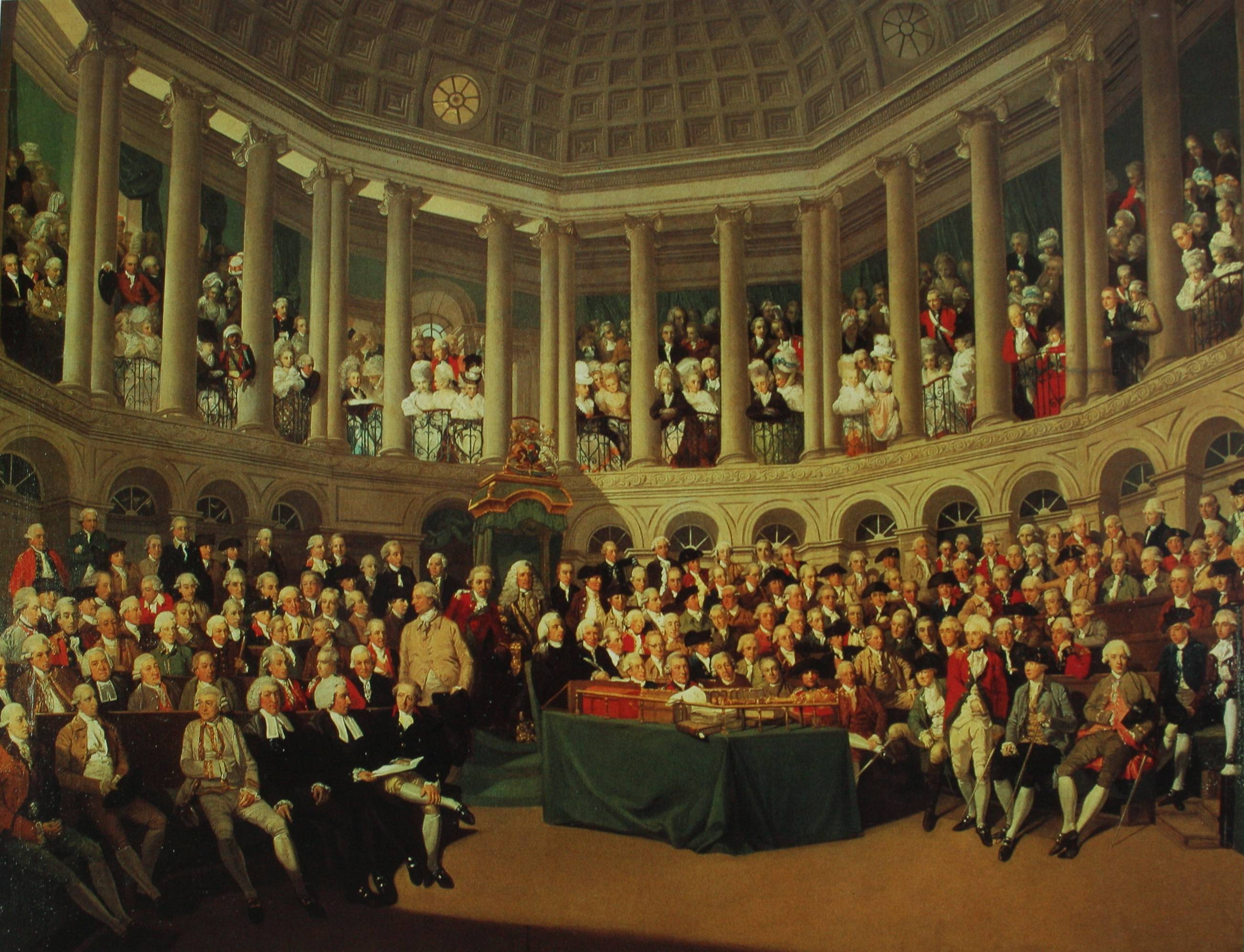
The Irish House of Commons, 1780

In the summer of 1779 he was in Dublin with Elizabeth, whom he passed off as his wife, and established himself there as a portrait-painter, executing, among other works, the best-known interior of the Irish House of Commons. He also painted the review of the Dublin regiments of the Irish Volunteers in College Green in November 1779, the basis for a best-selling print bought by numerous Irish Patriot supporters. He was careful to include the grandees of Dublin and also exotic visitors such as Princess Dashkov.

The circumstances of his private life were revealed, and he returned to London. He produced small landscapes, portraits, or street scenes, and began to work in imitation of the French painter Jean-Baptiste Greuze. His scene from the Gordon Riots of 1780 was engraved by James Heath; this was noted as one of his best, but was lost to a fire. He painted several subjects for Boydell's Shakespeare Gallery, designed illustrations to Bell's edition of the poets, and practised to some small extent as an etcher and mezzotint-engraver. It is, however, as a painter, in both oil and water-color, of landscapes and rustic subjects that Wheatley is best remembered. He was elected an associate of the Royal Academy in 1790, and an academician in the following year.

In 1774 Francis Wheatley married Rosamond Mann at St Paul, Covent Garden, London, England and that was thought to be the first marriage of the artist.

In 1787 he married one of his most popular models, the young Clara Maria Leigh (1768–1838), who was also an artist. They had four daughters, Clara Maria (1788–1847) who married Thomas Clark Brettingham in 1814, Frances (Fanny) (1790–1848) who married Charles Middleton in 1817, Caroline Groves (1793–1879) who married James Adams in 1812 and Emma (Feb 1795–Mar 1795) and a son Francis (1791–1872) who married Martha Ewing in 1813.

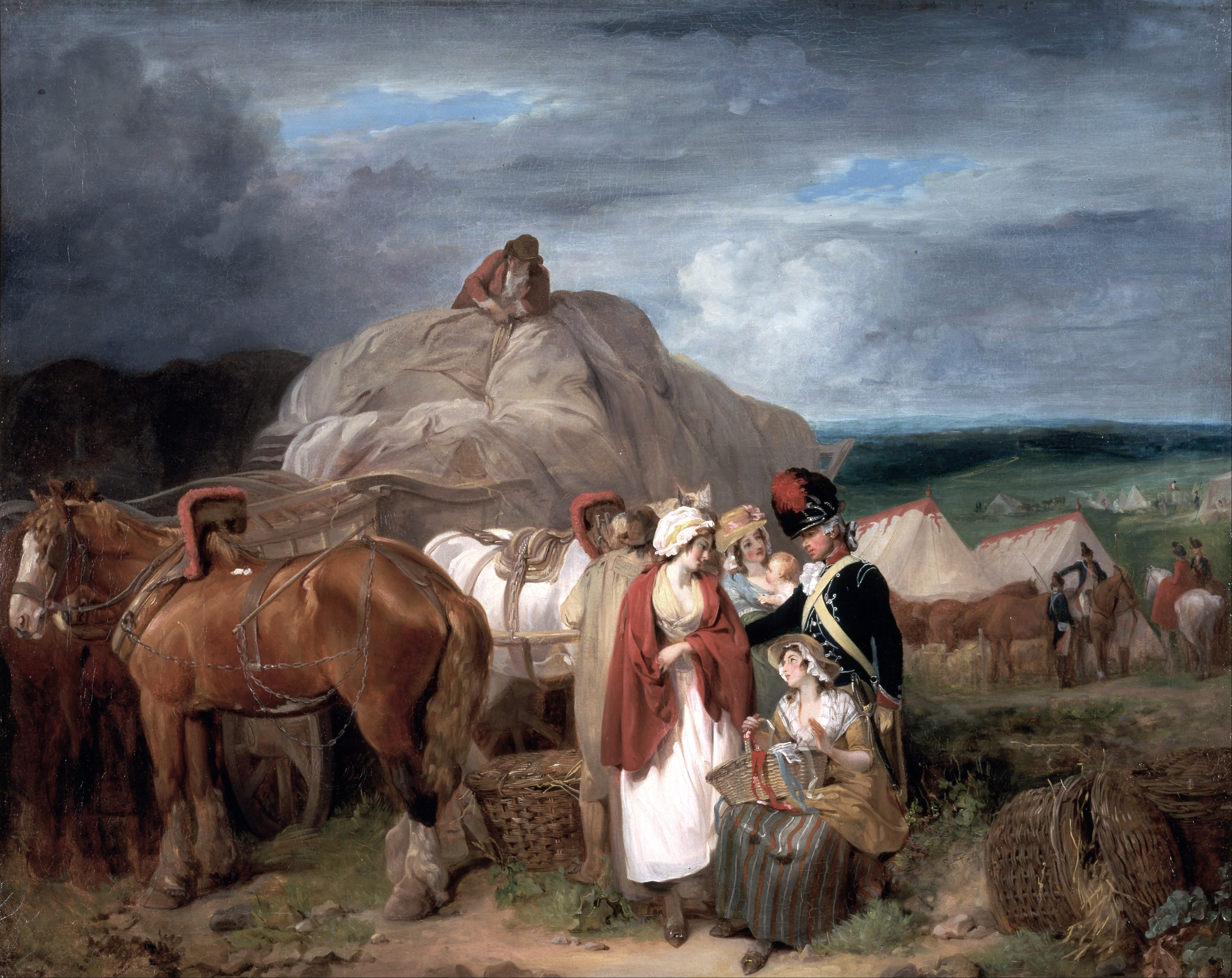
Soldier with Country Women Selling Ribbons, near a Military Camp

A contemporary biographer noted: "He died June 28th, 1801, aged fifty-four, leaving a widow and four children."

After Wheatley died, his widow married in 1807 the Irish actor Alexander Pope, and as Mrs Pope she was known as a painter of flowers and portraits.

The marriage of Caroline Groves Wheatley to James Adams at St George, Hanover Square and recorded in its register was witnessed by Clara Maria Pope, Marianne Leigh (a sister of Clara Maria Pope), Clara Maria Wheatley and Frances Wheatley.

The marriage of Clara Maria Wheatley to Thomas Clark Brettingham at St James, Piccadilly, Westminster and recorded in its register was witnessed by Clara Maria Pope and Thomas Key. Thomas Key, husband of Mary Lawe nee Barry, was a cousin-in-law of Clara Maria Pope and was the father of Thomas Hewitt Key.

Francis, the son, according to their register, was baptised at the Percy Chapel, St Pancras during 1791, the same location as his sister Frances was baptised during 1790. His marriage at St Mary-le-Bone, Middlesex was recorded in their register. Francis junior was a beneficiary along with his sisters in the Prerogative Court of Canterbury will of Marianne Leigh, an unmarried sister of his mother Clara Maria, the will being written in 1843 and proved in 1851: "I leave my three beloved nieces Clara Maria Brettingham, Fanny Middleton and Caroline Adams £10 each and Frank Wheatley £5". The England probate records indicate that at the date of Francis Wheatley, the son, death in 1872 his sister, Caroline Groves Adams wife of James Adams, was his only surviving next of kin.

Frances (Fanny) Wheatley was married in Bangalore, Madras, India and that event was reported in the 16 July 1818 edition of the Caledonian Mercury, Edinburgh, Midlothian, Scotland thus: "At Madras, in September last, Captain Middleton, of the 22d light dragoons, to Frances Wheatly, second daughter of the late Francis Wheatley, Esq. R. A.".

The baptisms and birth dates of Clara Maria and of Caroline Groves were recorded in the parish registers of St Mary, St Marylebone Road, St Marylebone, London and of St Pancras Old Church, London respectively.

Clara Maria was first cousin once removed to Sir Charles Barry through her mother Elizabeth nee Barry.

Francis Wheatley's life and work was reviewed by Mary Webster.

== Selected gallery ==
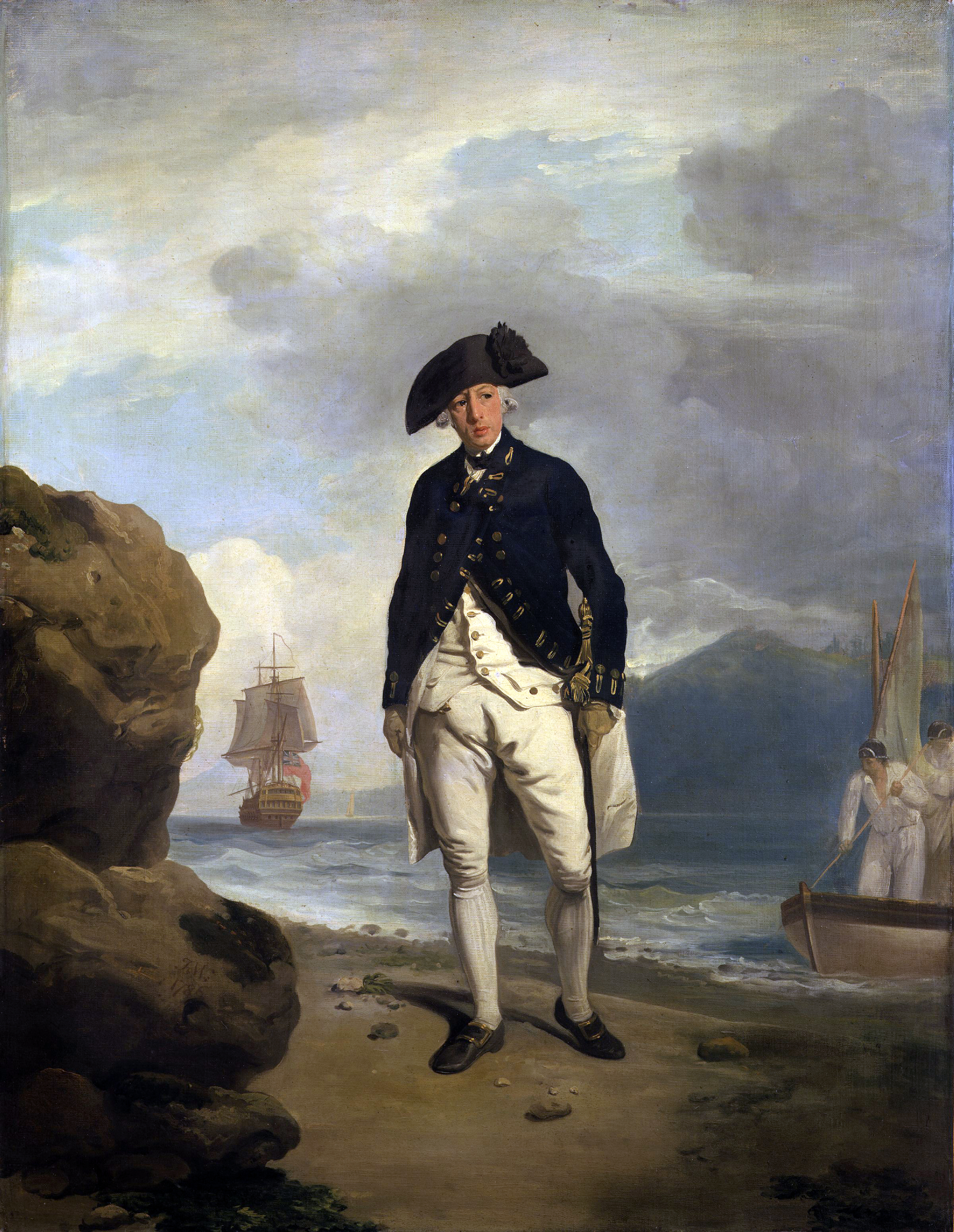
Arthur Phillip

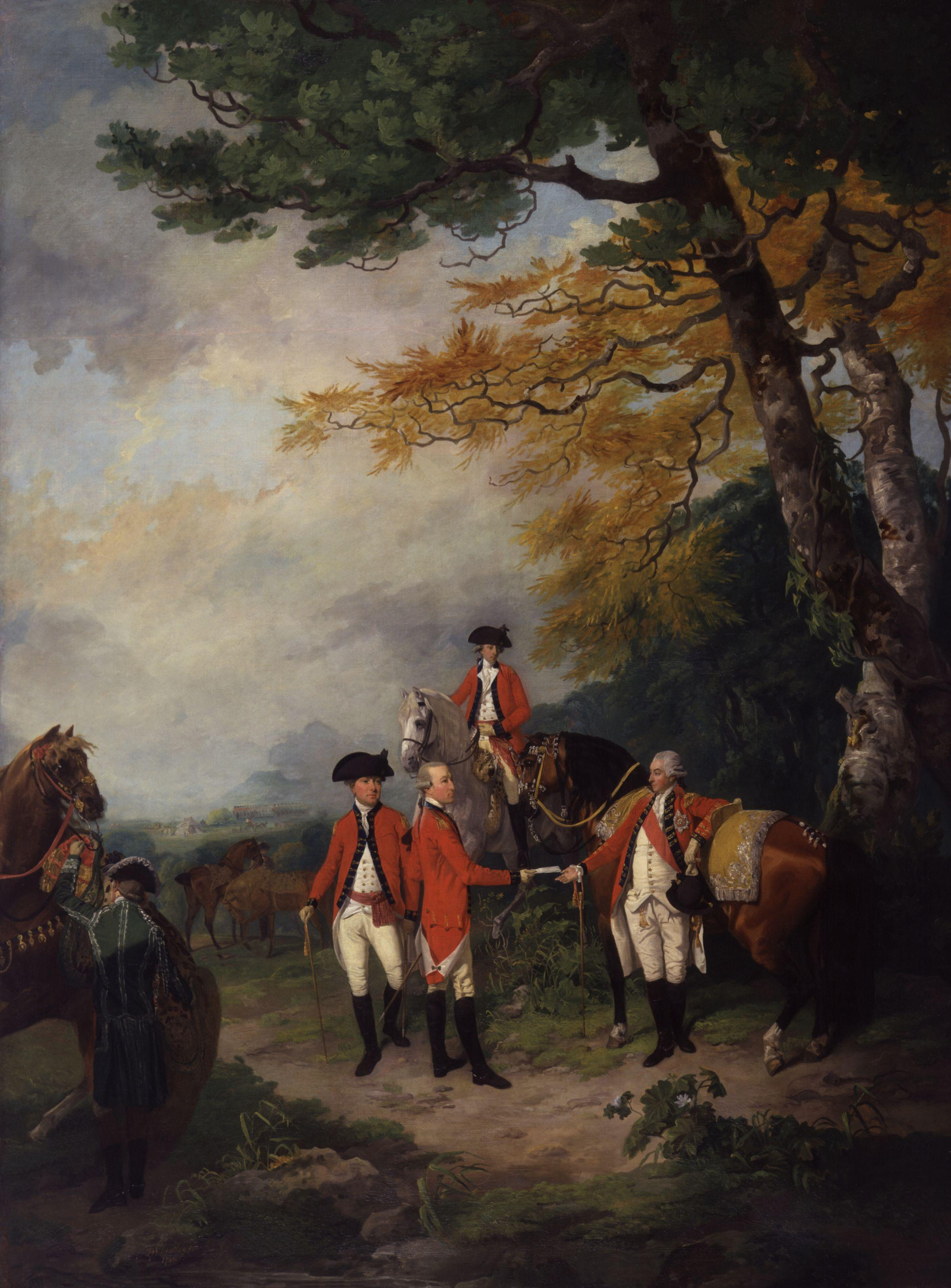
Sir John Irwin Reviewing Troops in Dublin, 1781

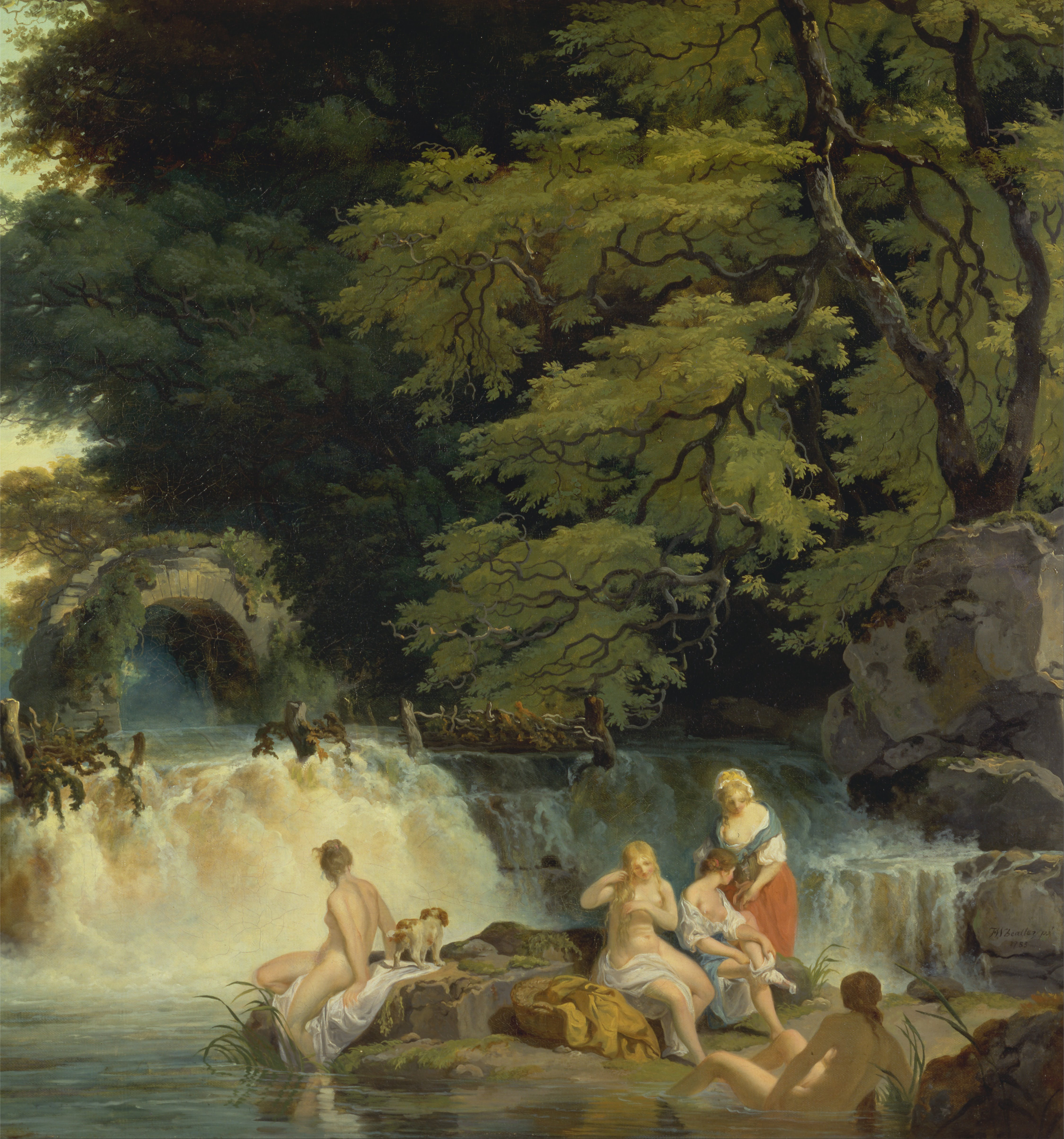
The Salmon Leap, Leixlip, 1783

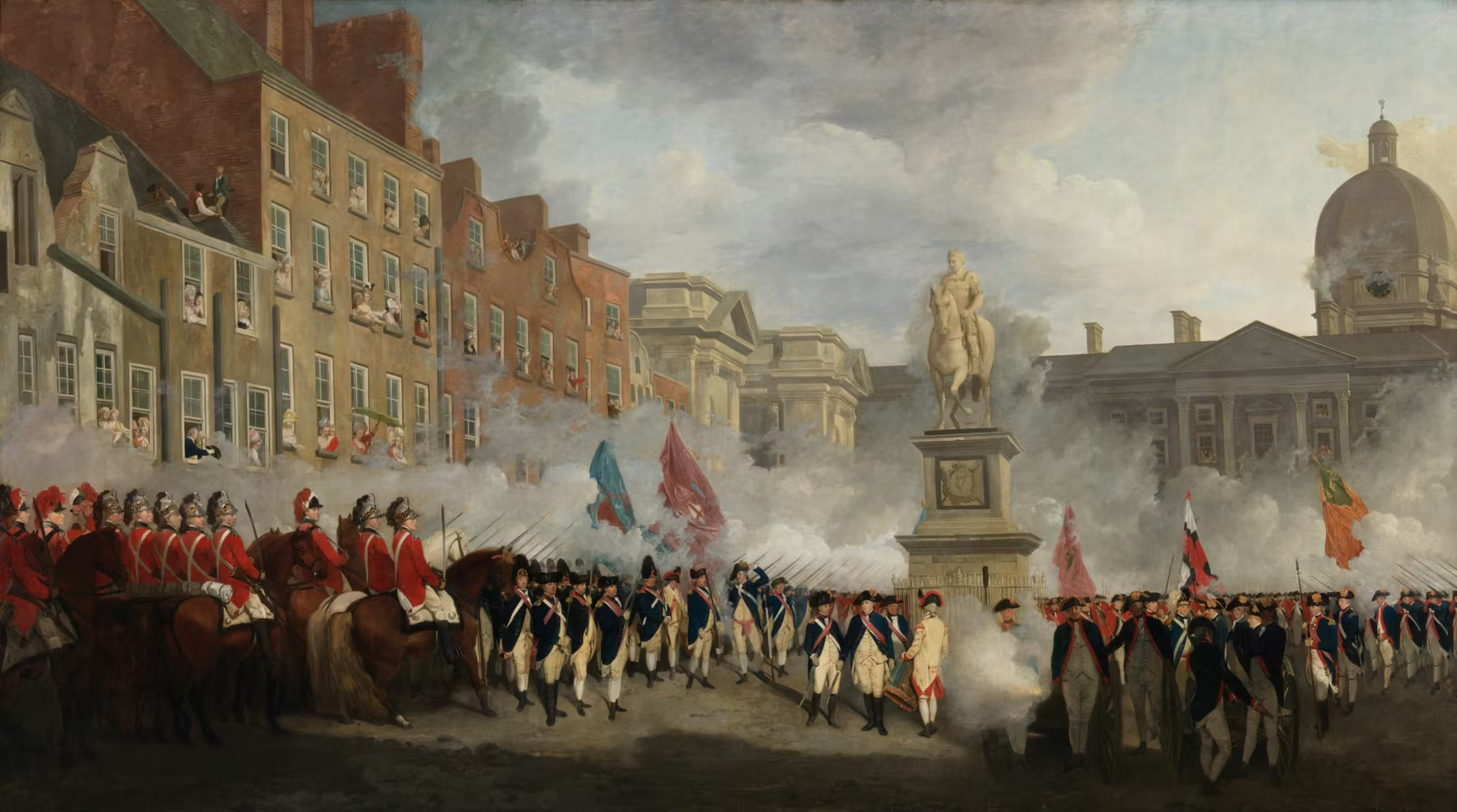
The Dublin Volunteers on College Green, 1779–1780

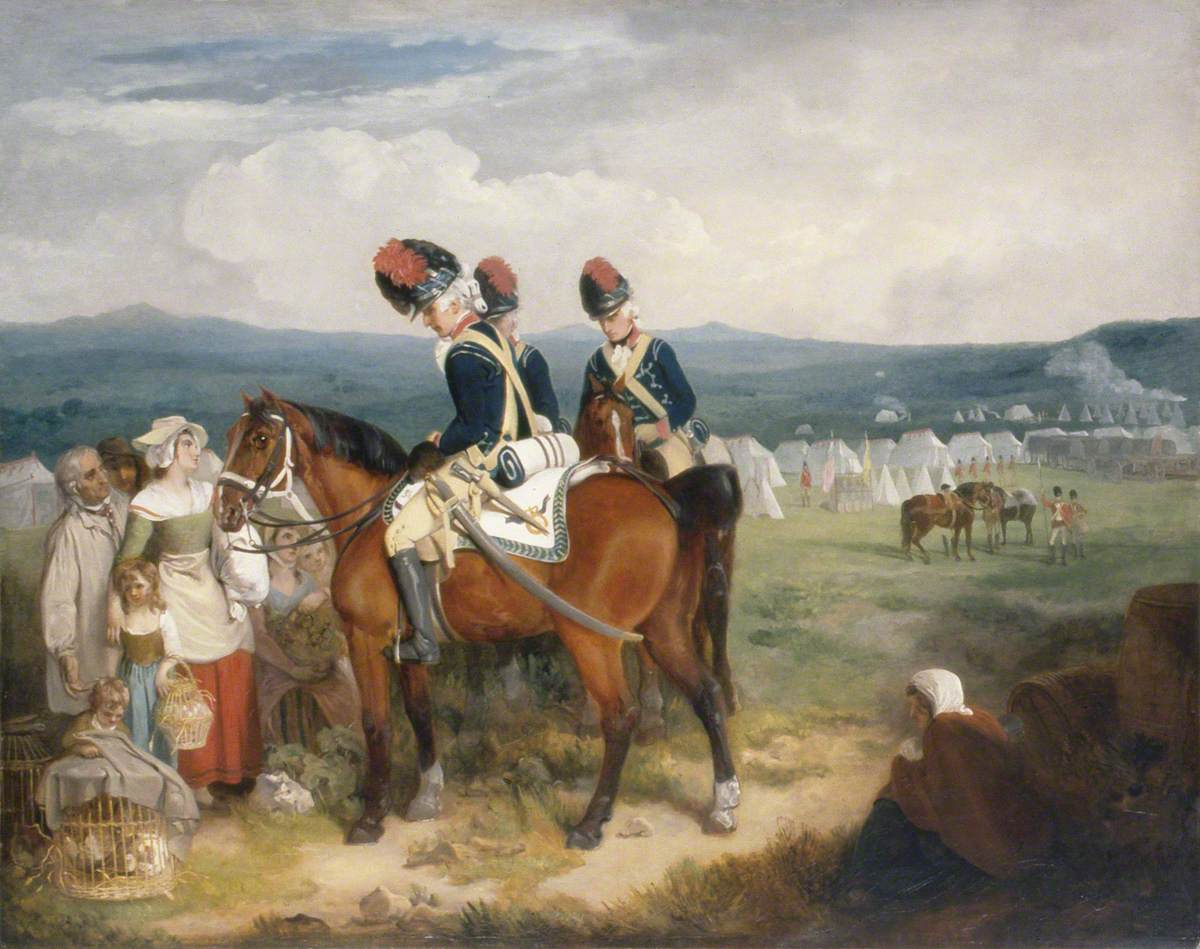
The Encampment at Brighton, 1788

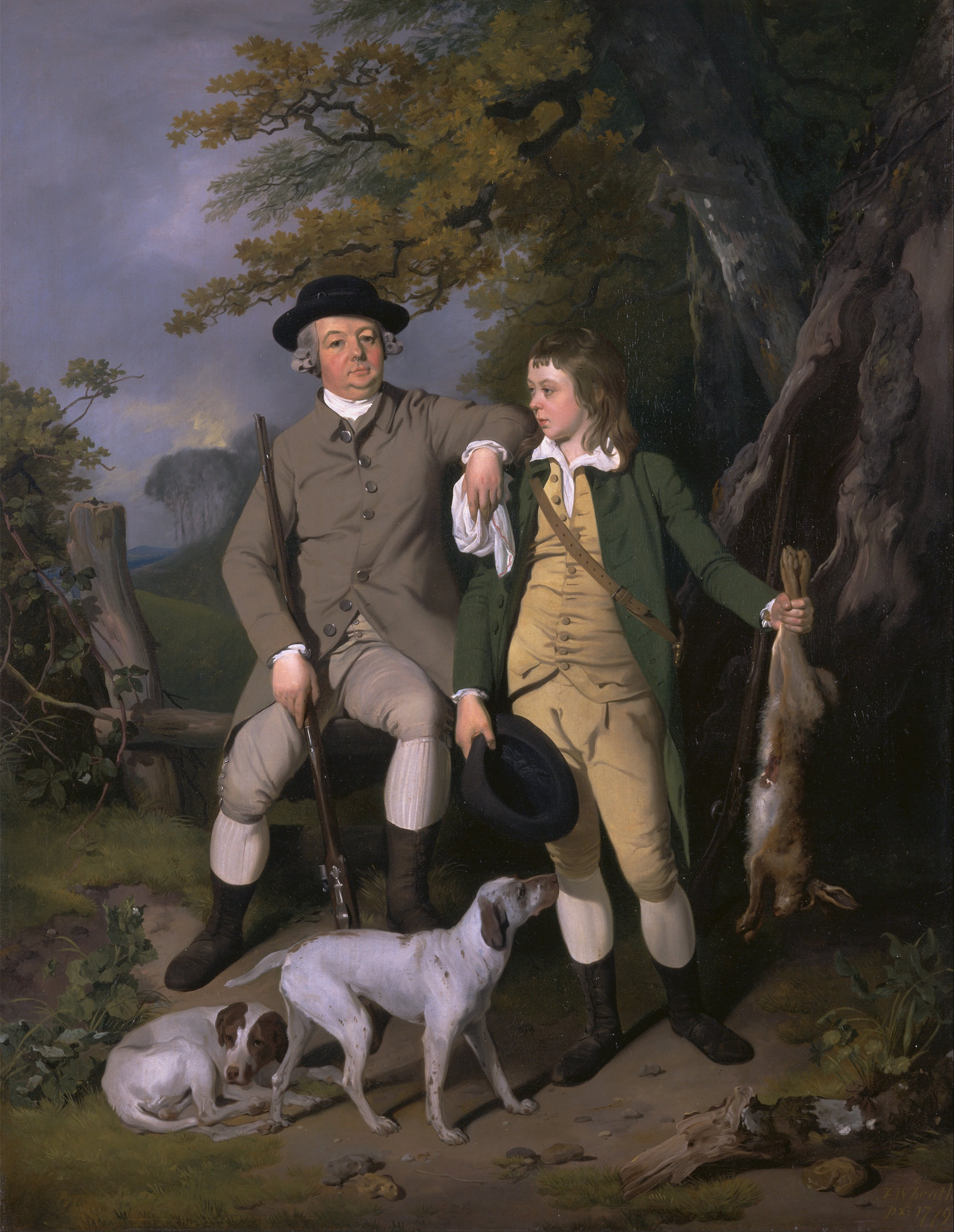
Portrait of a Sportsman with His Son

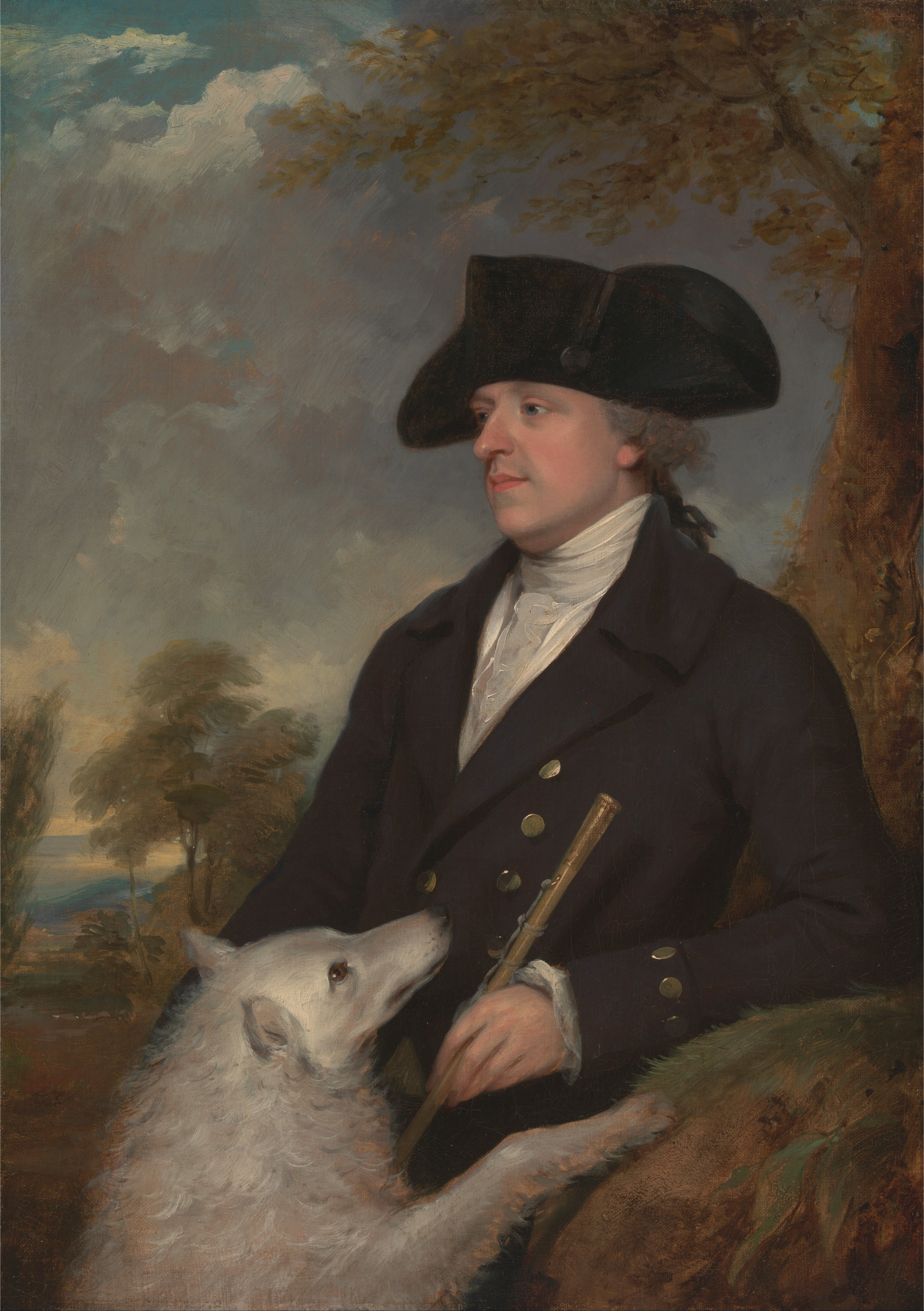
Captain Stevens

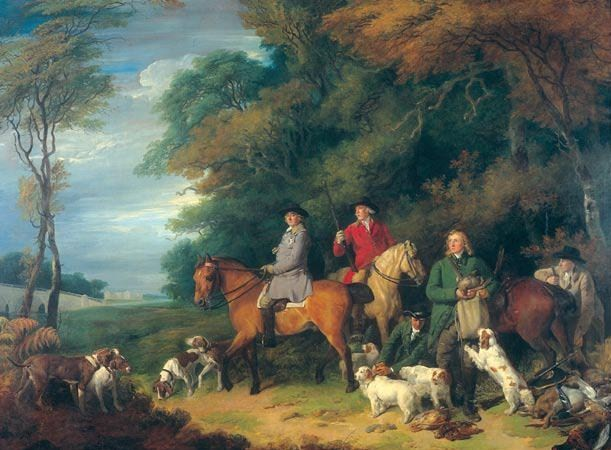
Duke of Newcastle seated on his horse next to his friend Colonel Litchfield, along with his gamekeeper, Mansell, and four Clumber Spaniels.

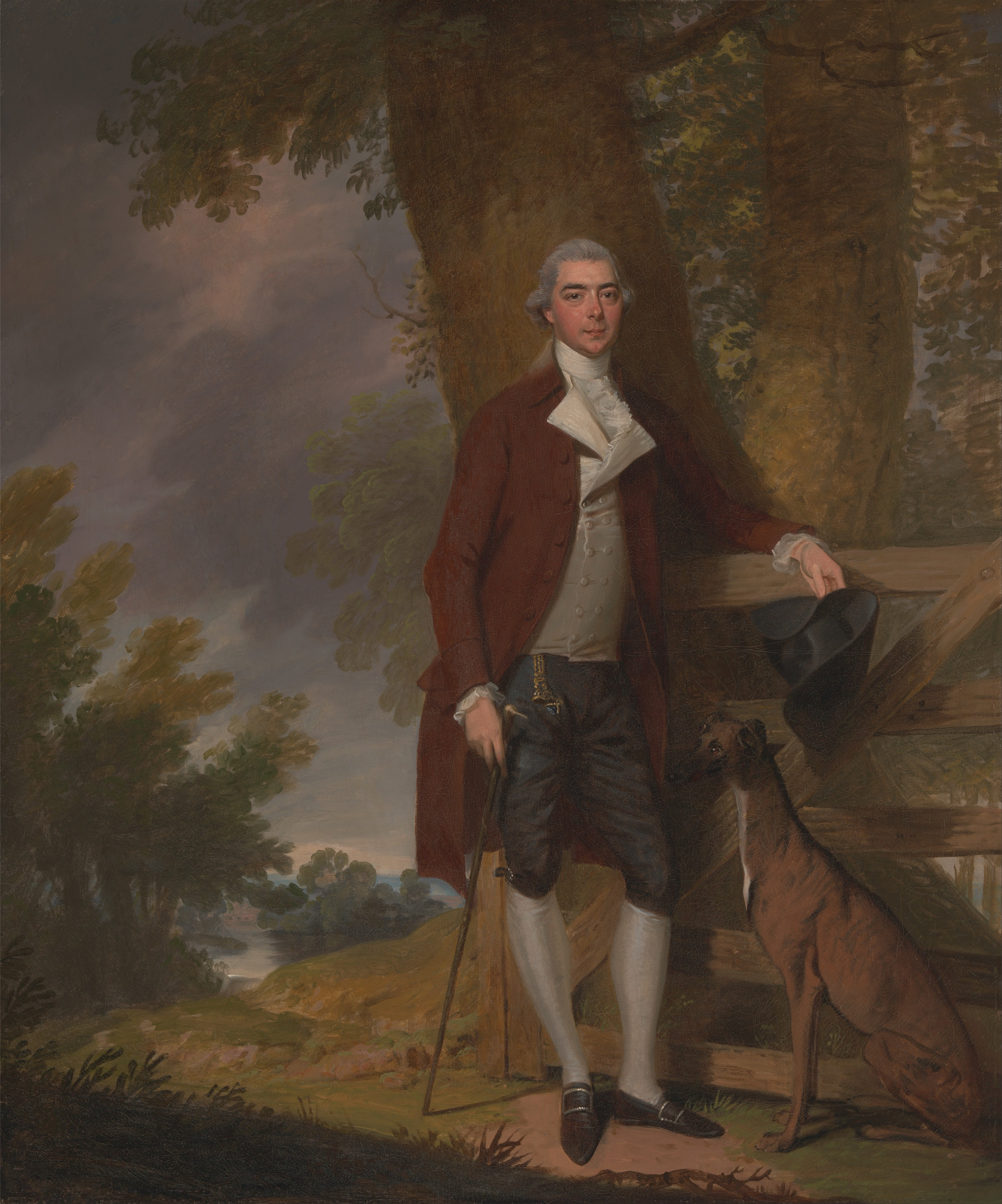
A Gentleman and his Dog in a Landscape

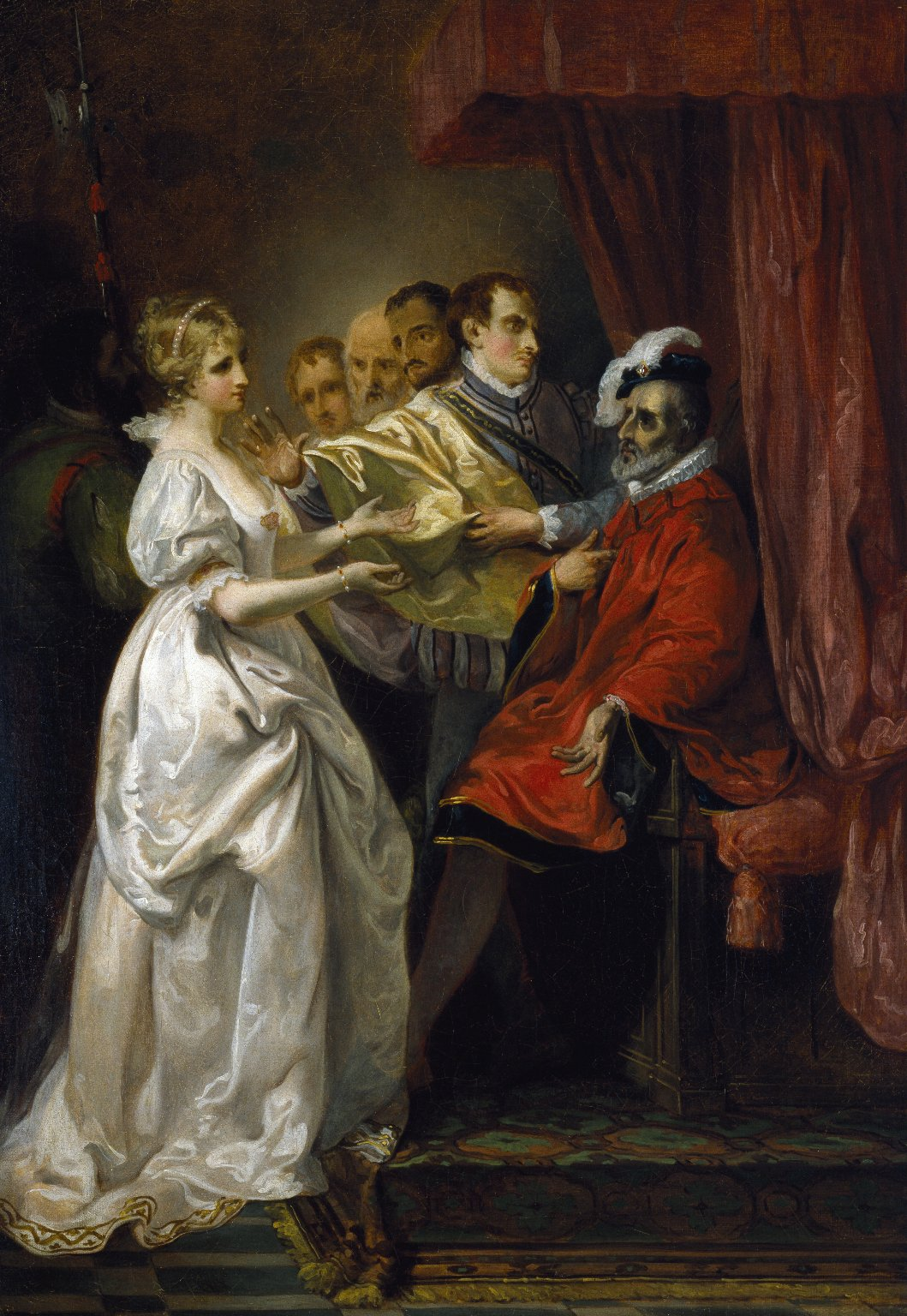
Helena and Count Bertram before the King of France

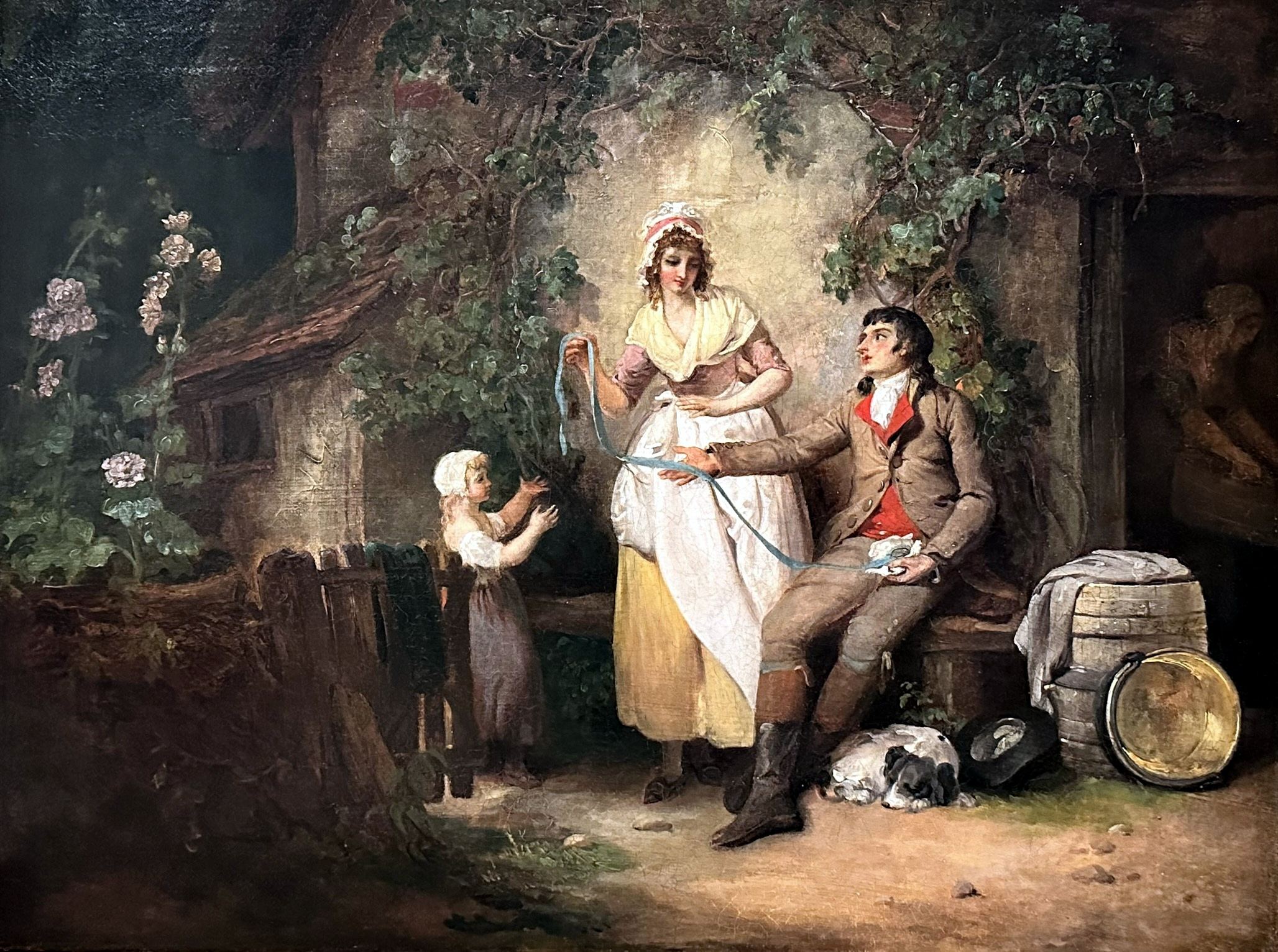
Return from the Fair

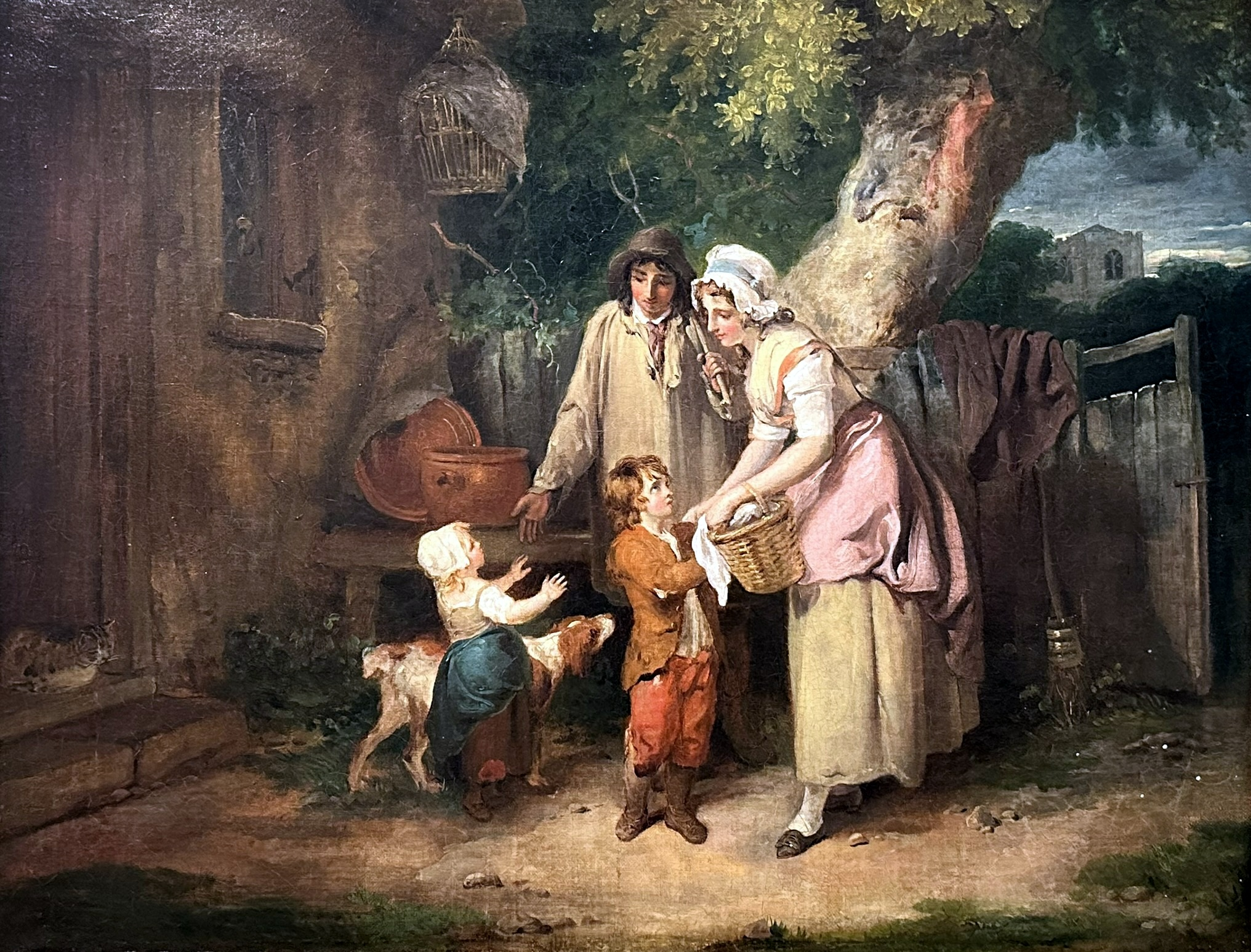
Return from the Market

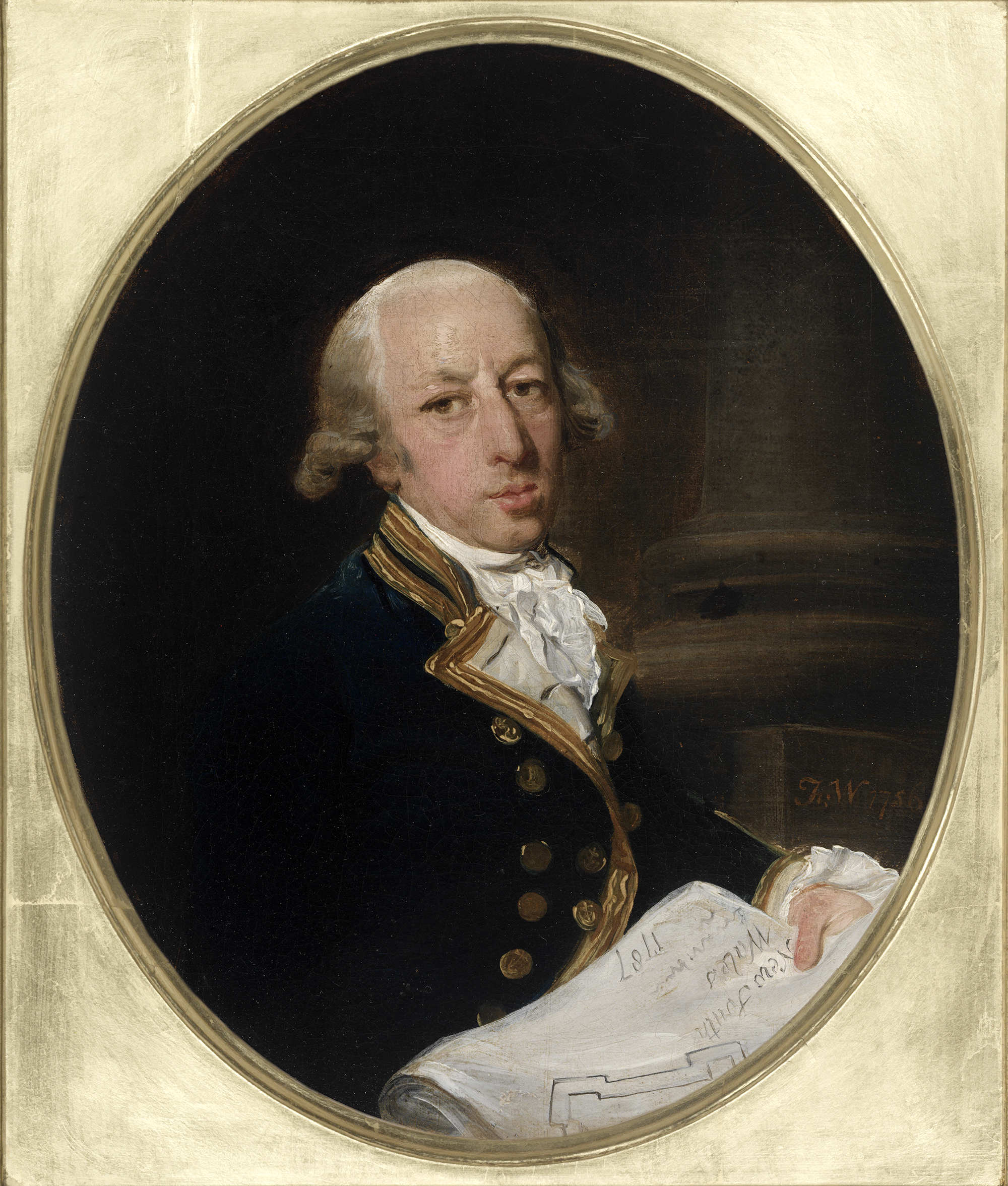
Captain Arthur Phillip
