= The Irish House of Commons =

Painting by Francis Wheatley

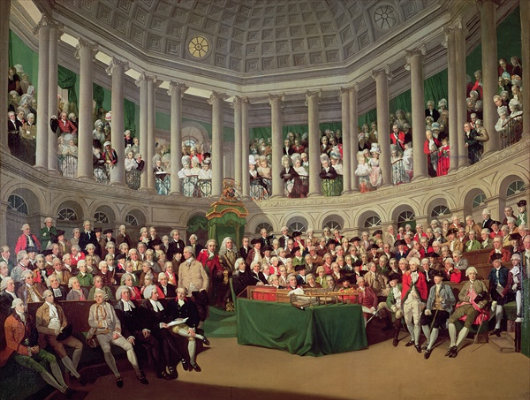
- Artist: Francis Wheatley
- Year: 1780
- Type: Oil on canvas, history painting
- Dimensions: 172.5 cm × 215.9 cm (67.9 in × 85.0 in)
- Location: Lotherton Hall, West Yorkshire

The Irish House of Commons is a 1780 history painting by the English artist Francis Wheatley. It depicts a session of the Irish House of Commons in the Parliament House in Dublin. Throughout the eighteenth century Ireland and Great Britain maintained separate, sister Parliaments until the Act of Union of 1801. The Whig Henry Grattan, a leader of the Patriot movement, is shown on the right of the table submitting a motion that the Parliament should have greater direct powers. Female spectators are shown crowding the galleries.

Wheatley was an early member of the Royal Academy of Arts in London. Today the painting is in the collection at Lotherton Hall, overseen by the Leeds Museums and Galleries, having been acquired as a gift from Alvary Gascoigne and his wife. The same year Wheatley produced his The Dublin Volunteers on College Green, now in the National Gallery of Ireland.

== See also ==
- The House of Commons, 1793–94, a depiction of the British Parliament by the Austrian artist Anton Hickel

== Bibliography ==
- Foster, R.F. The Oxford Illustrated History of Ireland. Oxford University Press, 2000.
- Higgins, Padhraig. A Nation of Politicians: Gender, Patriotism, and Political Culture in Late Eighteenth-Century Ireland University of Wisconsin Press, 2010.
