= Dixon Jones =

British architectural firm

Dixon Jones was a British architectural practice established in 1989 and closed in September 2020.

== History ==
Dixon Jones was founded by Jeremy Dixon and Edward Jones in 1989 as a partnership and became a limited company in 2003. The founders first met at the Architectural Association.

The practice closed in September 2020 after difficulties in securing new work and no clear succession plan.

== Significant projects ==
- Darwin College Study Centre, Cambridge University (1993)
- Royal Opera House, London (1999)
- National Portrait Gallery, London (2000)
- Somerset House Masterplan, London (2001)
- Saïd Business School, Oxford (2001)
- Kings Place, London (2008)
- Exhibition Road Masterplan (2011)
- Westgate, Oxford (2017)
