= Georges Quay =

Street in Dublin, Ireland

George's Quay
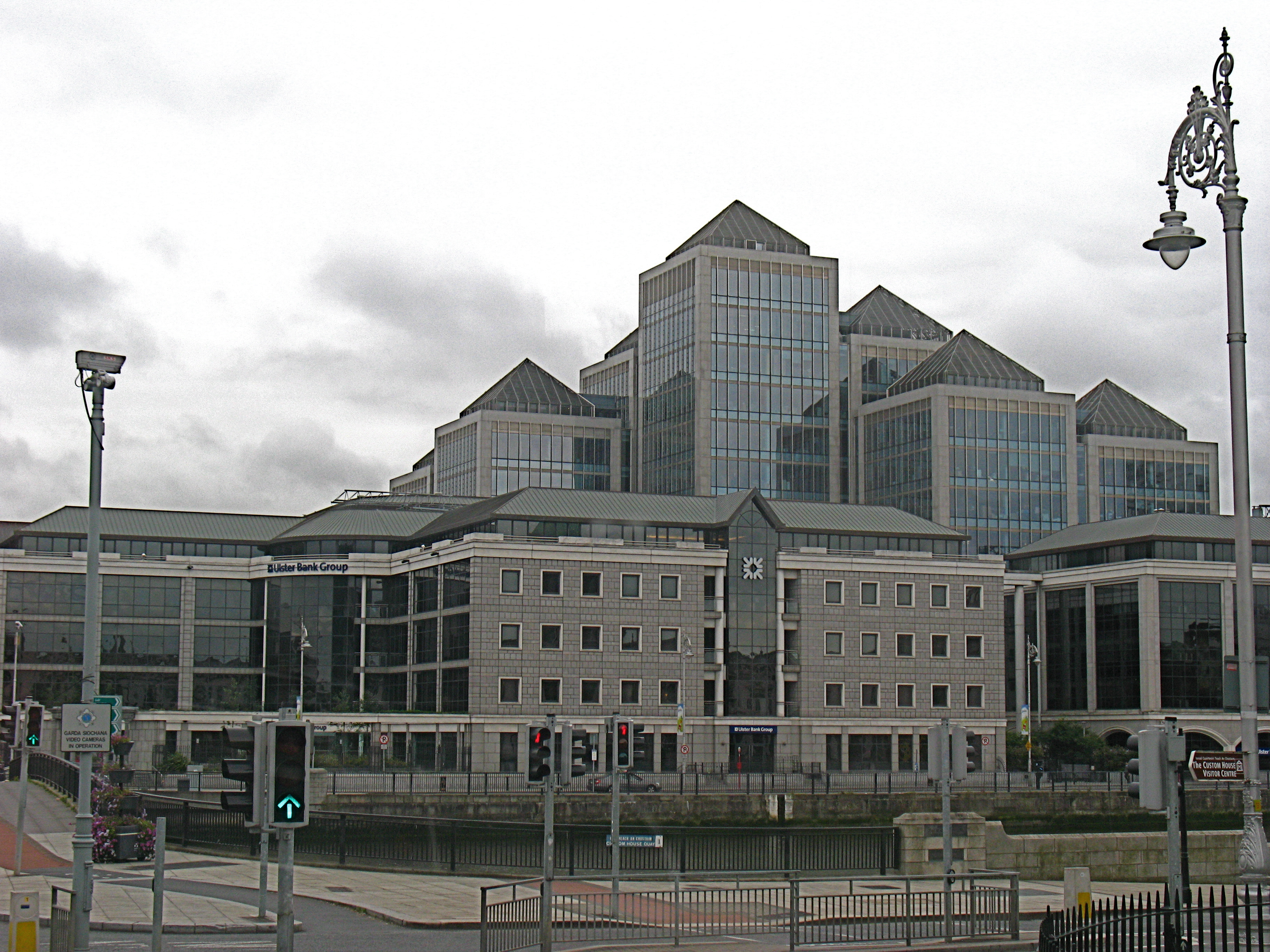
- One George's Quay Plaza was the headquarters of Ulster Bank

- Location within Central Dublin
- Native name: Cé Sheoirse (Irish)
- Namesake: King George III
- Length: 270 m (890 ft)
- Width: up to 25 metres (82 ft)
- Location: Dublin, Ireland
- Postal code: D02
- Coordinates: 53.347505°N 6.253217°W
- west end: Burgh Quay and Hawkins Street
- east end: Talbot Memorial Bridge, City Quay, Moss Street

Other
- Known for: Facebook and Ulster Bank headquarters

George's Quay is a street and quay in Dublin on the southern bank of the River Liffey. It is located between Burgh Quay and Hawkins Street to the west, and City Quay and Talbot Memorial Bridge to the east.

== History and development ==
Though earlier land-reclamation along the Liffey's south-eastern banks had allowed for construction in the area, as evidenced by the quay's name, its current layout derives from Dublin's "Georgian" development period in the 18th century. Most remaining buildings on the quay however date from 19th and (predominantly) 20th century construction.

Into the 21st century, a number of entities have published plans for increased development in the area - including Dublin City Council (in 2008) and Córas Iompair Éireann (in 2015).

== Current use ==
=== Commercial ===
The quay is fronted primarily by George's Quay Plaza - a complex of buildings located between Hawkins Street and Lombard Street. Along with the wider IFSC area, It is sometimes jokingly referred to as "Canary Dwarf" in reference to Canary Wharf in London. The 13-story complex faces the Custom House and, at 58.8 metres (193 ft) high, is one of the tallest in the capital after Liberty Hall. Completed in 2002, it was designed by KMD Architecture, and housed the headquarters of Ulster Bank. Initial plans for the development by Irish Life dated from the 1980s. Following their departure from the Irish market, Ulster Bank vacated the Plaza in 2019.

=== Transport ===
Tara Street railway station is on the quay close to the junctions with Butt Bridge and Tara Street. It is one of the busiest commuter rail stations in Dublin. Dublin Bus and a number of commercial operators also have bus-stops along the quay.
