= Tara Street =

Street in Dublin, Ireland

Coordinates: 53.3473°N 6.2549°W

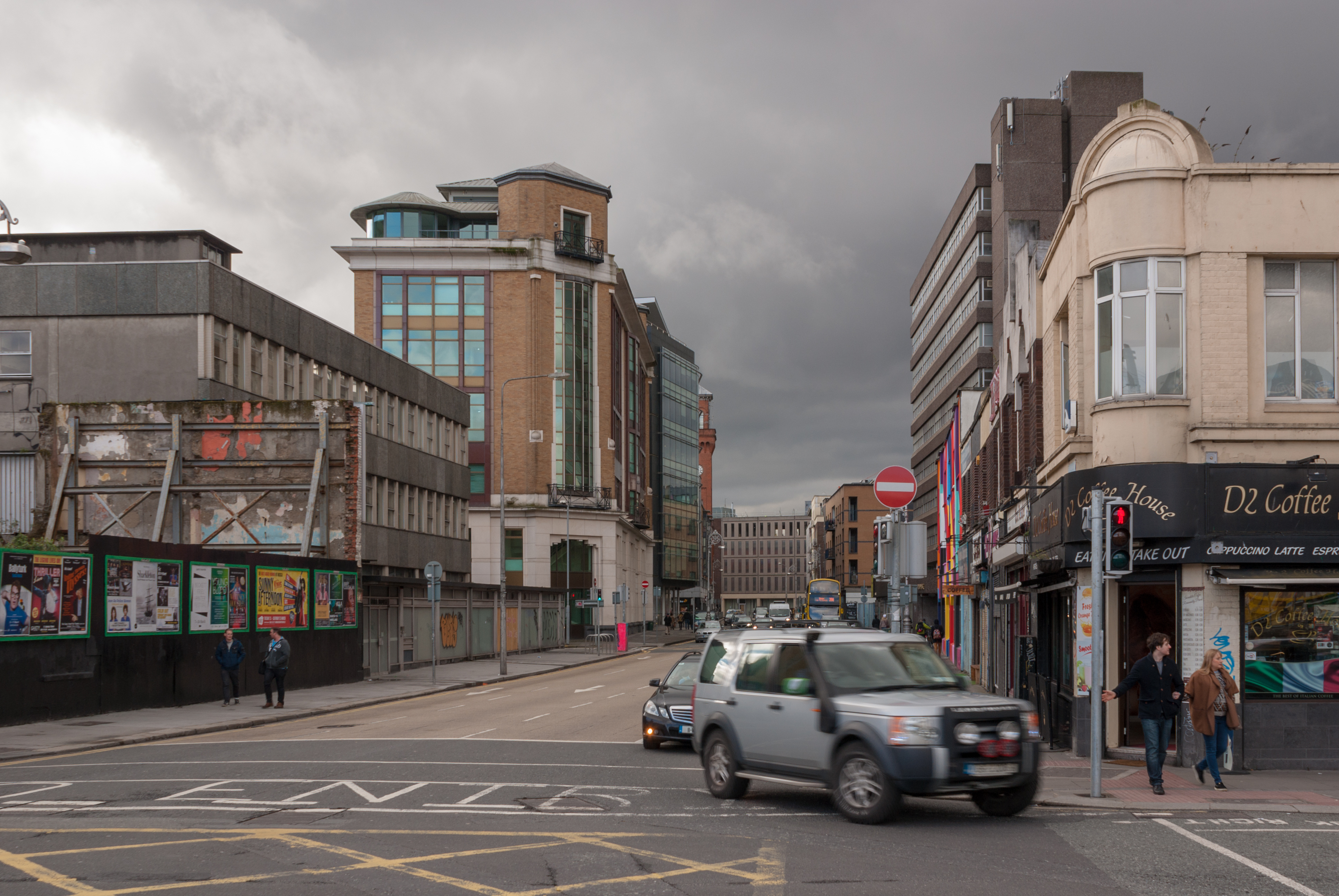
- View of the street facing south

- Location within Central Dublin
- Native name: Sráid na Teamhrach (Irish)
- Namesake: Hill of Tara
- Length: 260 m (850 ft)
- Width: 16 metres (52 ft)
- Location: Dublin, Ireland
- Postal code: D02
- north end: Butt Bridge, Burgh Quay, George's Quay
- south end: Pearse Street

Construction
- Inauguration: 1885

Other
- Known for: Tara Street railway station, The Irish Times

Tara Street (Irish: Sráid na Teamhrach) is a major traffic route in Dublin, Ireland, partly due to the current one-way traffic flow in the city centre.

== Location ==
It links Pearse Street to the northern side of the city via Butt Bridge – traffic flows to the north. The street gives its name to Tara Street railway station, which is around the corner on Georges Quay, near the northern end of Tara Street.

== History ==
It was developed as a completely new street in 1885 replacing Shoe Lane, part of which was called Stocking Lane, Fleet Market, and George's Street. The street was named after Tara, the home of the ancient high kings of Ireland. It was the home of Tara Street Baths, opened in 1886, and demolished in 1986 when it was replaced by the Countess Markievicz Pool.

In April 1907 Dublin Fire Brigade opened its headquarters at the new fire station at the corner of Tara Street and Pearse Street. This would be the headquarters of the Fire Brigade until a new headquarters was opened in Townsend Street in 1998. The brick watch tower at the intersection of the two streets is now a protected structure.

During the Easter Rising, British artillery shelled Liberty Hall from Tara Street, though the road surface made it difficult.

Tara Street was widened in 1932 after Butt Bridge was changed from a swing bridge to a three span fixed structure.

In October 2006, The Irish Times moved to new headquarters in Tara Street. Previously, it had been based on D'Olier Street

== Literary connection ==
Leopold Bloom thinks about using the Tara Street public baths in the Calypso section of the novel Ulysses.
