= Eden Quay =

Quay in Dublin, Ireland

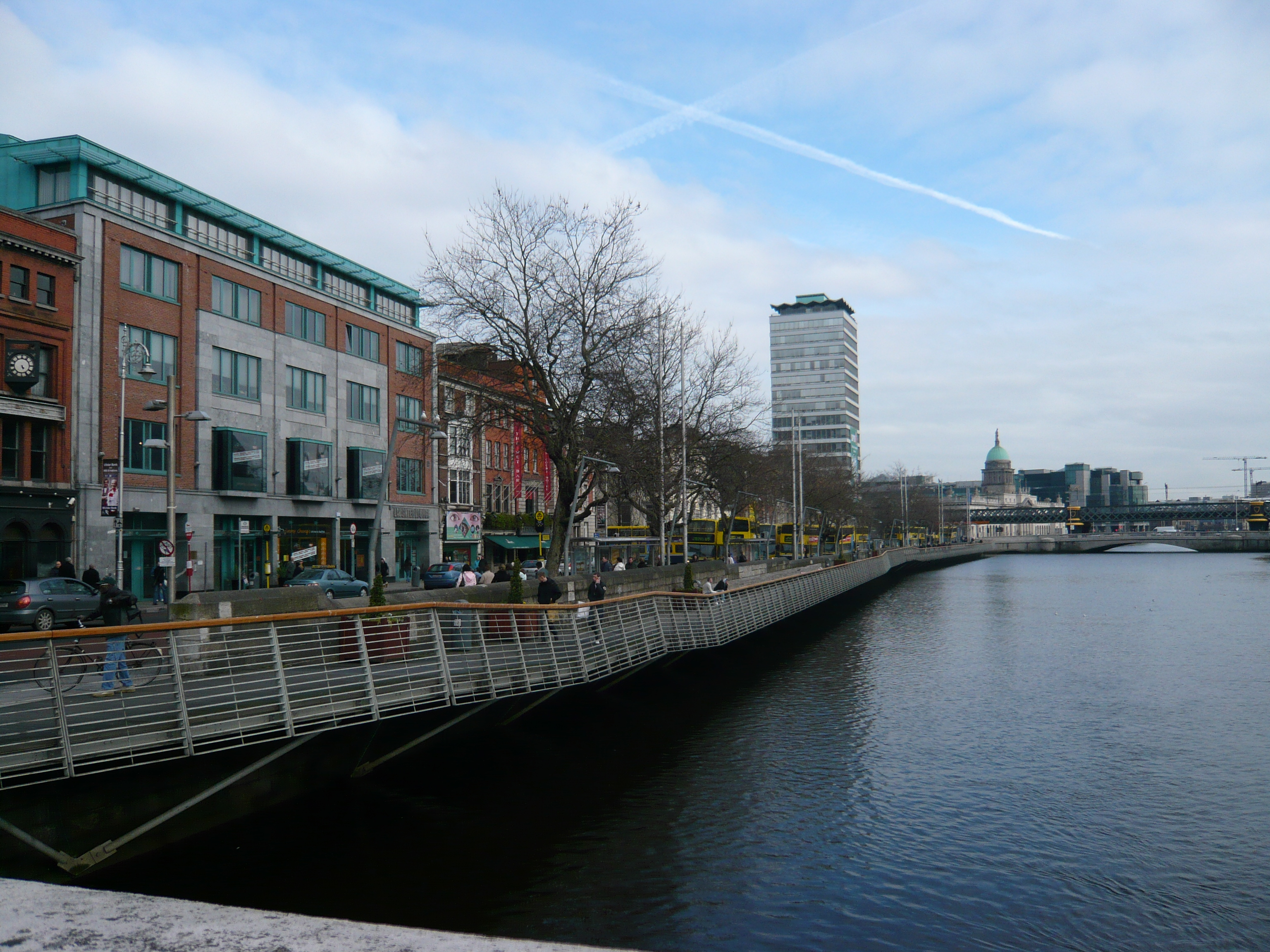

- Location within Central Dublin
- Native name: Cé Éidin (Irish)
- Namesake: William Eden, 1st Baron Auckland
- Length: 130 m (430 ft)
- Width: 20 metres (66 ft)
- Location: Dublin, Ireland
- Postal code: D02
- Coordinates: 53.348°N 6.257°W
- west end: City Quay, Creighton Street
- east end: dead end

Construction
- Construction start: 1716

Other
- Known for: Liffey Boardwalk, Liberty Hall, hotels

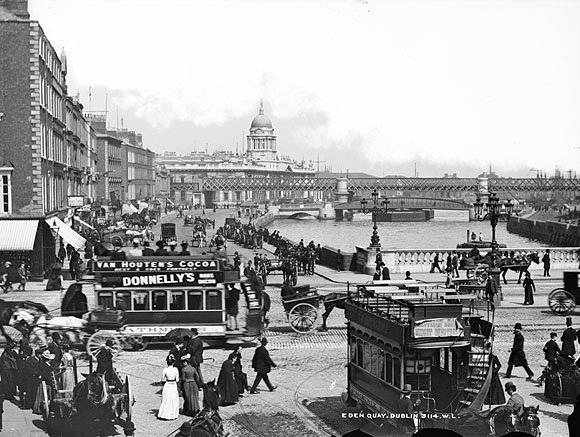
Eden Quay at the turn of the 20th century

Eden Quay (Irish: Cé Éidin) is one of the Dublin quays on the northern bank of the River Liffey in Dublin. The quay runs the bank between O'Connell Bridge and Butt Bridge. The quay is bisected by Marlborough Street and Rosie Hackett Bridge, roughly halfway along its length. The quay is also designated R105 as part of the Irish regional roads convention.

Liberty Hall dominates the eastern end of the quay, while at the opposite end is the Irish Nationwide building, both of which were rebuilt following their destruction by the Royal Navy during the 1916 Easter Rising.

Businesses on the quay include a number of hotels, bars, restaurants, newsagents, a music venue ('The Wiley Fox'), and a comedy club ('The Laughter Lounge') which was built on the site of a former cinema.

The quay is a major terminus for Dublin Bus services to the north east of the city and to the south, with more than 20 routes starting at (or transiting through) the quay. Routes include 14, 15, 27, 27a, 27b, G1, G2, 60, 74 and 151

The Liffey Boardwalk, a pedestrian walkway which overhangs several of the Liffey's quays, covers the length of Eden Quay.
