= John Chaloner Smith =

Irish civil engineer, collector and writer on British mezzotints

John Chaloner Smith (19 August 1827 – 13 March 1895) was an Irish civil engineer, remembered as collector of and writer on British mezzotints.

== Life ==
Smith was born in Dublin in 1827. His father was a proctor of the ecclesiastical courts, and married a granddaughter of Travers Hartley, M.P. for Dublin in the Irish parliament. Chaloner Smith was admitted to Trinity College, Dublin, in 1846, and in 1849 graduated B.A. He was articled to George Willoughby Hemans the engineer, and in 1857 was appointed engineer to the Waterford and Limerick Railway. In 1868 he took a similar position in the Dublin, Wicklow and Wexford Railway, and held it till 1894. He carried out some major extensions of the line, and was mainly responsible for the Loopline Bridge crossing the River Liffey, connecting the Great Northern and South-Eastern railways of Ireland.

He died at Bray, County Wicklow.

== Works ==
His British Mezzotinto Portraits … with Biographical Notes (London, 1878–84, 4 pts.) consists of a full catalogue of plates executed before 1820, with 125 autotypes from plates in Smith's possession. The latter were also issued separately. This "remains the definitive catalogue of the subject". The print-room at the British Museum contains an interleaved copy with manuscript notes. Smith was a collector of engravings, principally mezzotints, which were sold after the completion of his book in sales between 1887 and 1896. Some 300 of them, especially those by Irish printmakers, were purchased for the National Gallery of Ireland in Dublin through Sir Edward Guinness, and the British Museum bought 106.

Chaloner Smith took an interest in the financial relations between England and Ireland, and published pamphlets on the subject. Just before his death he was examined before the Royal Commission which was appointed to consider the question.
