= The Custom House, Dublin =

Government building in Dublin, Ireland

The Custom House
- Teach an Chustaim
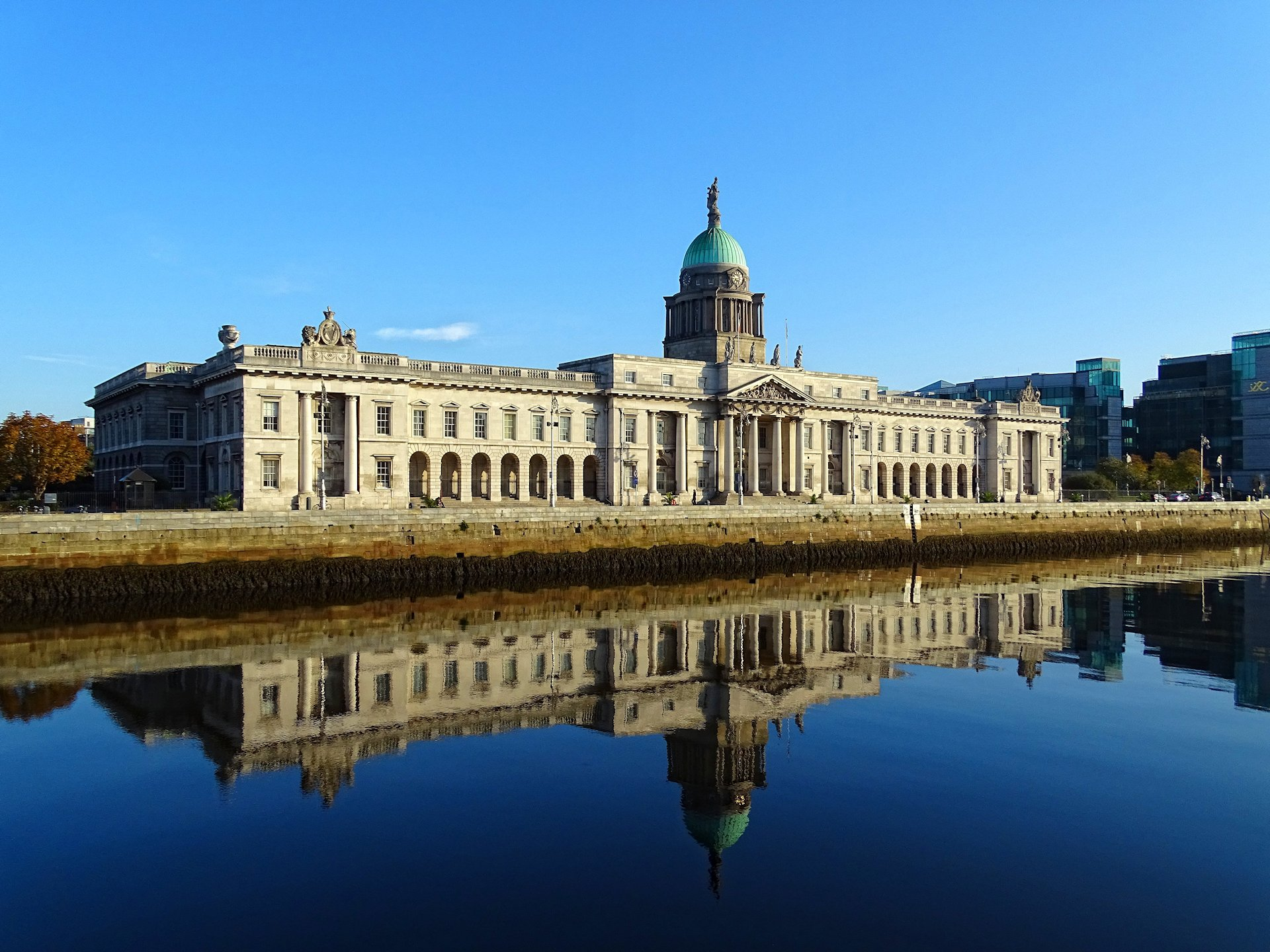
- Southern façade of the Custom House

- Location within Central Dublin

General information
- Type: Custom house, local government offices
- Architectural style: Palladian, Neoclassical
- Location: Dublin
- Coordinates: 53.3485°N 6.2531°W
- Construction started: 1781
- Completed: 1791
- Cost: £200,000 pounds sterling
- Owner: Government of Ireland
- Affiliation: Headquarters of Department of Housing, Local Government and Heritage

Technical details
- Material: Portland stone, later replacement Ardbraccan limestone was used

Design and construction
- Architect: James Gandon

The Custom House (Irish: Teach an Chustaim) is a neoclassical 18th century building in Dublin, Ireland which houses the Department of Housing, Local Government and Heritage. It is located on the north bank of the River Liffey, on Custom House Quay between Butt Bridge and Talbot Memorial Bridge.

== History ==
=== Origins ===
A previous Custom House had been built in 1707 by engineer Thomas Burgh (1670–1730). However, by the late 18th century it was deemed unfit for purpose.

The building of a new Custom House for Dublin was the idea of John Beresford, who became the first commissioner of revenue for Ireland in 1780. In 1781 he appointed James Gandon as architect, after Thomas Cooley, the original architect on the project, had died. This was Gandon's first large-scale commission. The new Custom House was unpopular with the Dublin Corporation and some city merchants who complained that it moved the axis of the city, would leave little room for shipping, and was being built on what at the time was a swamp and is detailed as reclaimed land on John Roque's 1756 map of Dublin as being part of Amory's Grant.

Purchase of land was delayed and proved exorbitant and the laying of foundations was disrupted by the High Sheriff and members of the Dublin Corporation with a mob of several thousand. However, Beresford was determined to complete the project and ignored the protests.

=== Construction ===
Construction started in 1781, and for his assistants, Gandon chose Irish artists such as Meath stone-cutter Henry Darley, mason John Semple and carpenter Hugh Henry. Every available mason in Dublin was engaged in the work. When it was completed and opened for business on 7 November 1791, it had cost £200,000 to build – a considerable sum at the time. The four facades of the building are decorated with coats-of-arms and ornamental sculptures (by Edward Smyth) representing Ireland's rivers. Another artist, Henry Banks, was responsible for the statue on the dome and other statues.

The adjacent original Custom House Dock and swing bridge on the East side of the building were also designed by Gandon and completed slightly later in 1796. Along with George's Dock, it later formed part of the Custom House Docks complex. The old dock was eventually filled in and the swing bridge was removed in the 1940s to be replaced by an extended quay and later to be replaced by Memorial Road.

=== Use and redevelopment ===
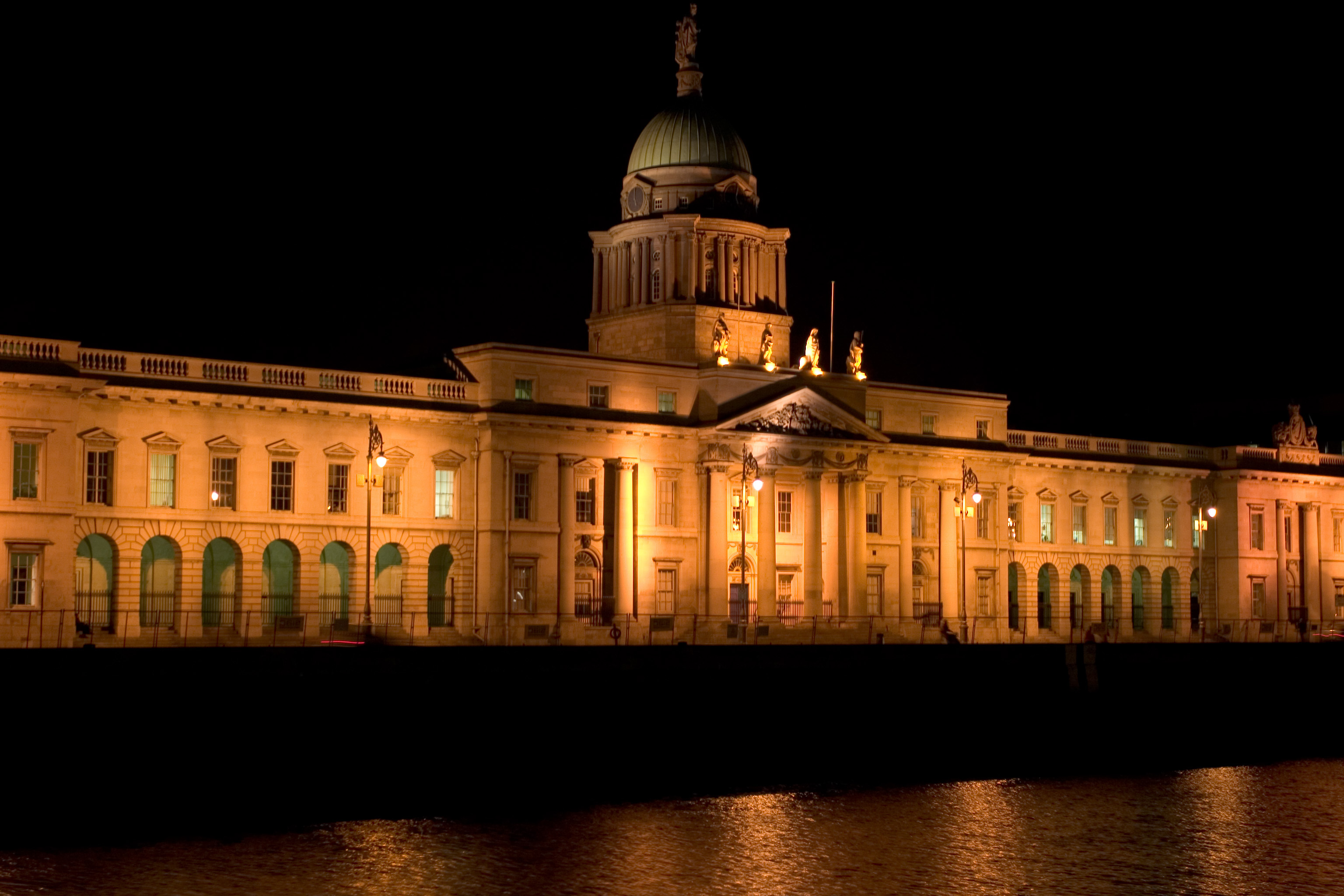
The Custom House at night

In 1890, the view of the building from O'Connell Bridge was mentioned in a tourist guidebook: "Down-stream we see Custom House Bridge, and on the N. bank the handsome pile of the Custom House with its graceful dome, the river thereabouts being commonly a forest of masts."

As the port of Dublin moved further downriver, the building's original use for collecting customs duties became obsolete, and it was used as the headquarters of the Local Government Board for Ireland.

During the Irish War of Independence in 1921, the Irish Republican Army burnt down the Custom House, to disrupt British rule in Ireland by destroying tax records. Gandon's original interior was completely destroyed in the fire and the central dome collapsed. A large quantity of irreplaceable historical records were also destroyed in the fire. Despite achieving its objectives, the attack on the Custom House was a setback for the IRA as a large number of Volunteers were captured either during the attack or when falling back.

After the Anglo-Irish Treaty, it was restored by the Irish Free State government. The results of this reconstruction can still be seen on the building's exterior today – the dome was rebuilt using Irish Ardbraccan limestone which is noticeably darker than the Portland stone used in the original construction. This was done to promote Irish resources.

Further restoration and cleaning of the stonework was done by an Office of Public Works (OPW) team in the 1980s.

In November 2021, a visitor experience opened at the Custom House, exploring the building, burning and restoration of the structure; it was developed by the OPW, Department of Housing, Local Government and Heritage and Fáilte Ireland.

== See also ==
- 18th-century Western domes

== Gallery ==
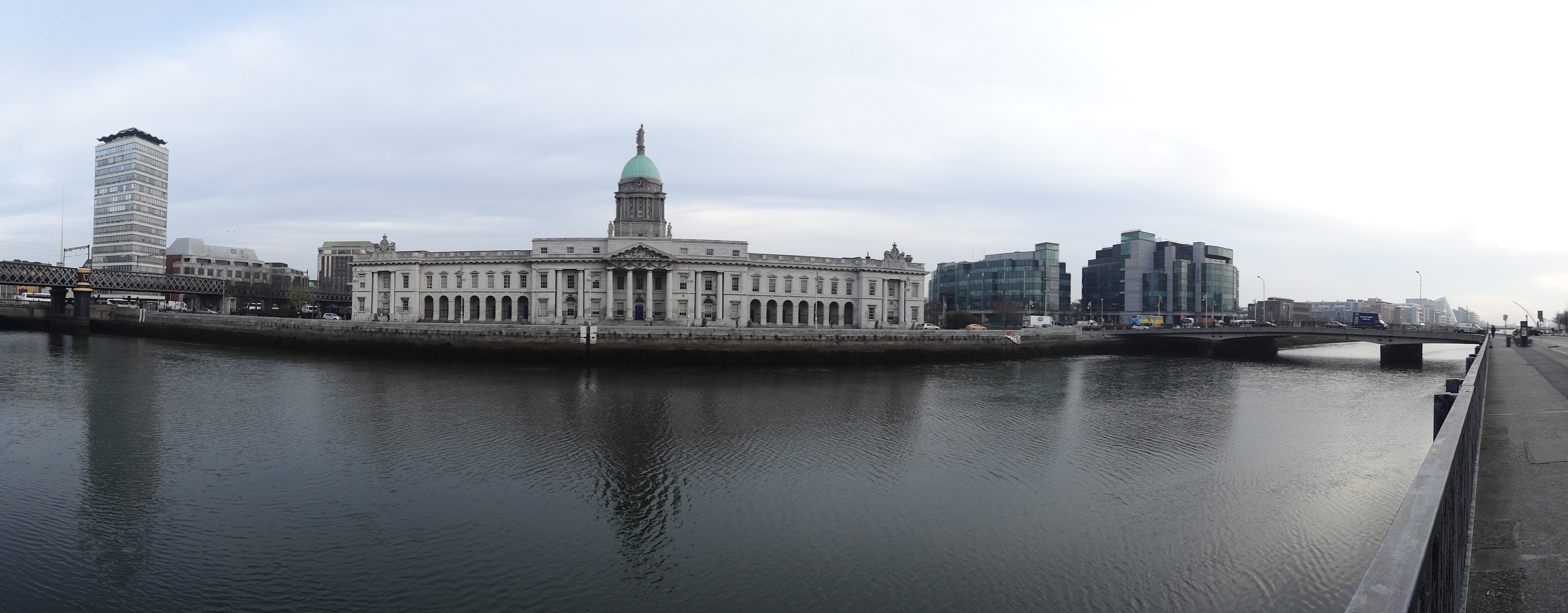
Panoramic view of The Custom House, with Liberty Hall on the left, and the International Financial Services Centre on the right

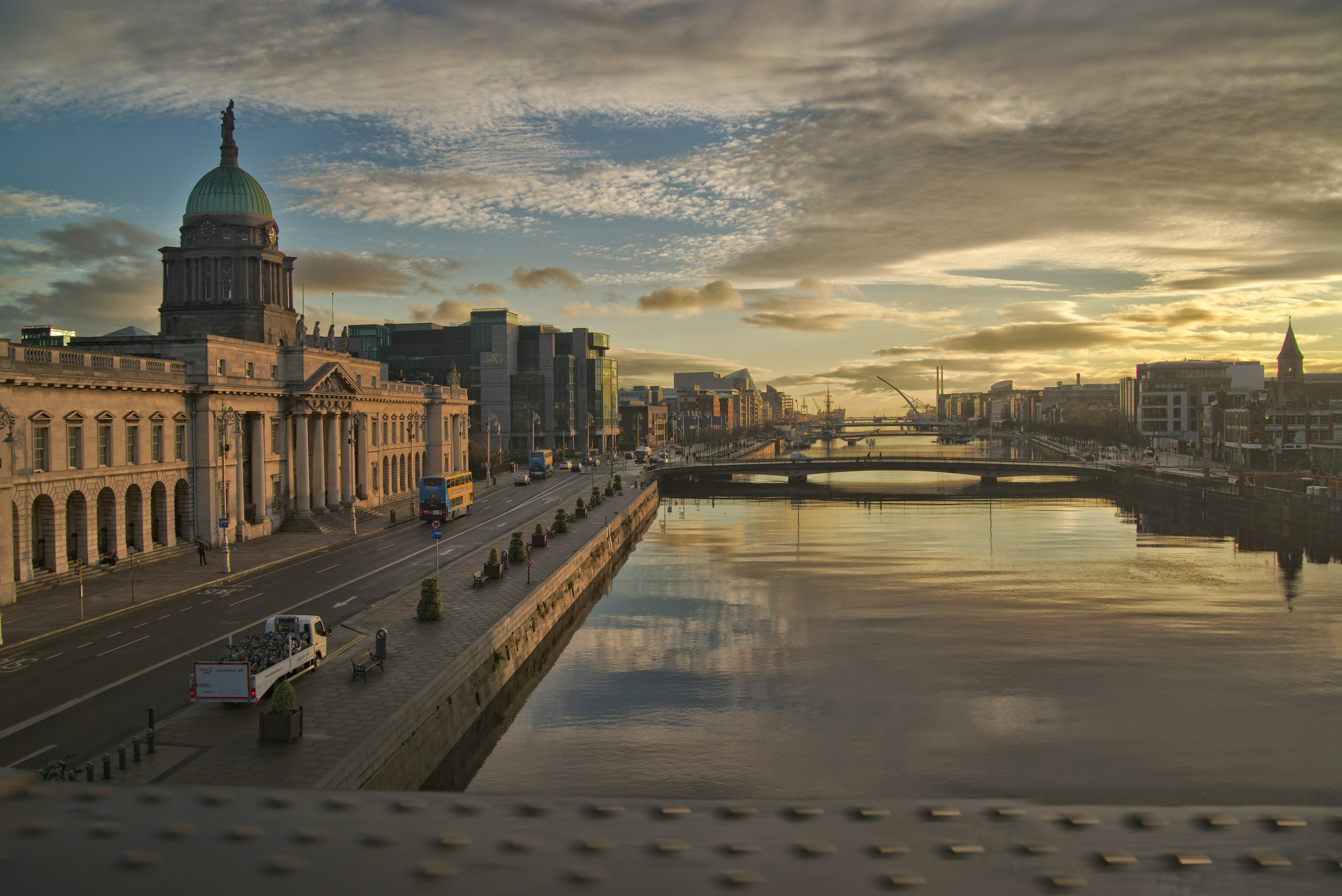
Looking east at dawn from Loopline Bridge
