= Talbot Memorial Bridge =

Bridge over the River Liffey in Ireland

Talbot Memorial Bridge Droichead Cuimhneacháin an Talbóidigh
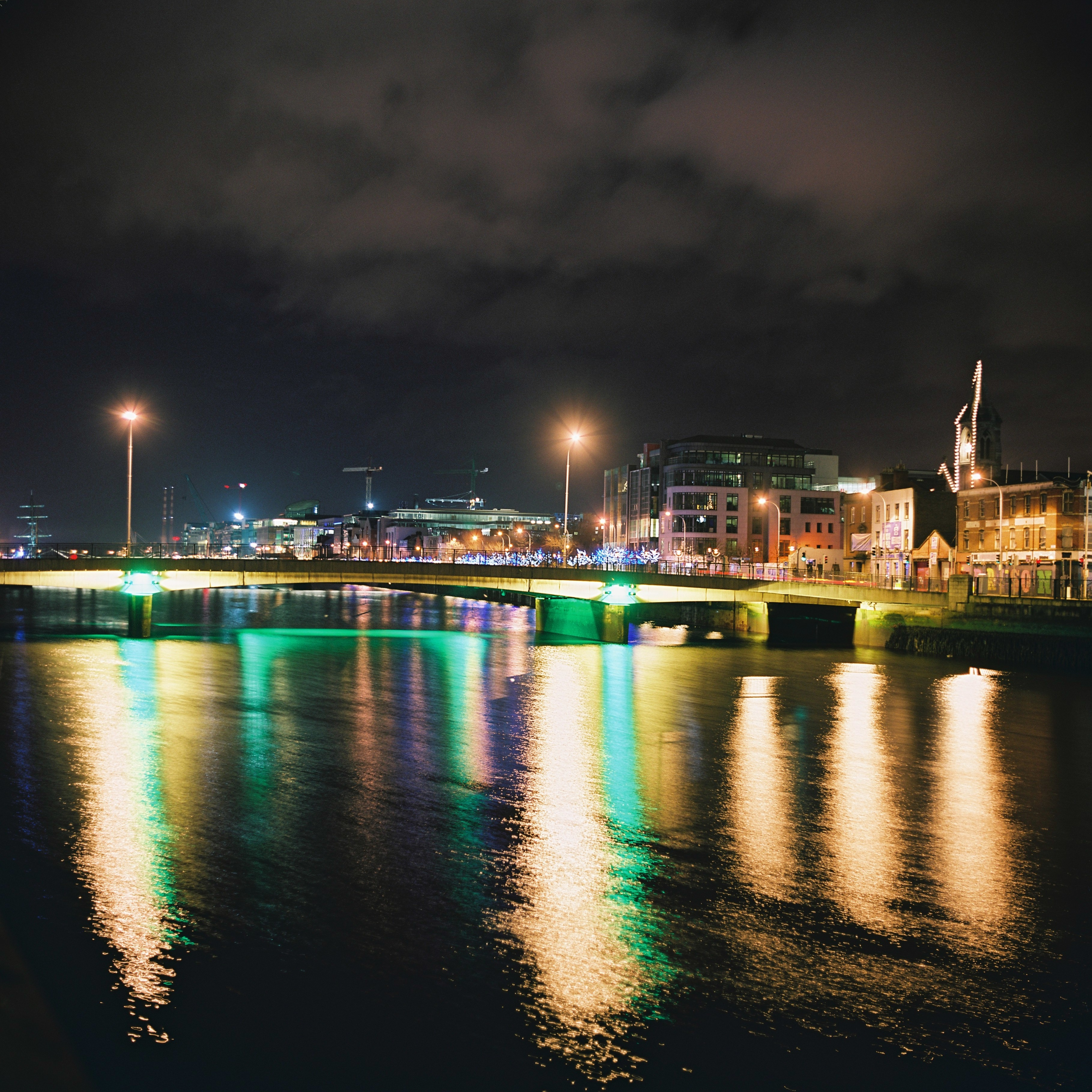
- Talbot Memorial Bridge looking downstream
- Coordinates: 53.3478°N 6.2517°W
- Crosses: River Liffey
- Locale: Dublin, Ireland
- Preceded by: Loopline Bridge
- Followed by: Seán O'Casey Bridge

Characteristics
- Total length: 80m
- Width: 22m
- No. of spans: 3

History
- Designer: De Leuw, Chadwick & O'hEocha Engineers
- Constructed by: Ascon Ltd
- Construction start: April 1976
- Construction end: February 1978
- Construction cost: IR£1.05million
- Opened: 14 February 1978; 48 years ago

Location
- Interactive map of Talbot Memorial Bridge

The Talbot Memorial Bridge (Irish: Droichead Cuimhneacháin an Talbóidigh), also known as the Matt Talbot Bridge, is a one-way road bridge spanning the River Liffey in Dublin, Ireland. The bridge marks the furthest point up to the Liffey to which tall ships may travel, as all bridges downriver of it are either swingbridges or bascule.

== History ==
=== Background and construction ===
By the early 1960s, rising traffic volumes and severe congestion in Dublin had prompted the commissioning of reports to identify potential solutions. One of these was the General Traffic Plan for Dublin produced by German traffic engineering expert Professor Karl-Heinz Schaechterle in 1965, which advocated for an inner ring road to be built in the city, to be known as the Tangent Road. In a Dáil Éireann debate in late 1969, Minister for Local Government Kevin Boland noted his "approval in principle" to Schaechterle's inner tangent road suggestion, but noted that certain issues were still being dealt with:

These issues include those arising on land acquisition, on amenity questions and on the corporation's application for a bridge order for a new bridge just east of Butt Bridge, which would form part of the inner tangent ring."

Announced in 1974, Dublin Corporation hoped the new bridge would alleviate the traffic bottleneck which then existed at the Custom House, one of the worst in Dublin according to RTÉ. They also hoped that a new traffic system would "alleviate traffic problems in the centre city area", and that the south wall would "be able to handle incoming traffic and a new exit road (would) be built eventually." As Hamilton and Phillips write, "the purpose of the bridge was to create a gyratory movement on the north and south quays and remove traffic eastwards from the city centre."

Completed in 1978, it was the first bridge built over the Liffey in Dublin city in the twentieth century. At the time of construction, it was the most easterly bridge on the river, although three more have since been built further east. It is 22 metres (72 feet) wide, 80 metres long, and was designed by De Leuw, Chadwick and O'hEocha Consulting Engineers. Construction work was undertaken by Ascon Limited. The bridge structure consists of 11 centre beams weighing 28 tonnes each, which were loaded onto a barge and pushed into midstream by a tug boat. The foundations for the bridge are reinforced concrete which exist on a natural rock formation in the river bed. The bridge is flat and lies at the same height as the existing quays and roads at either side of the river.

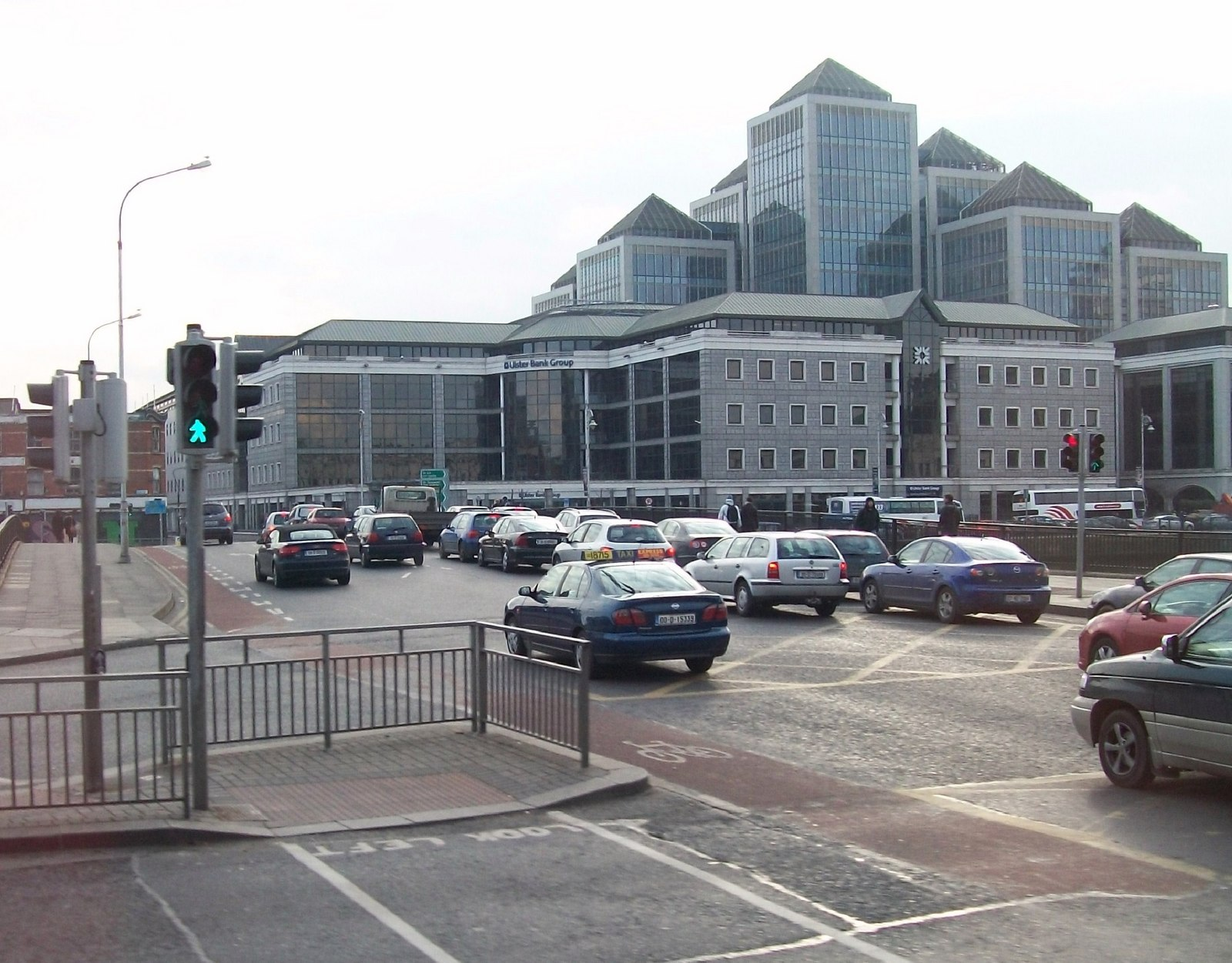
Cars travelling south over the bridge in 2010, with One George's Quay Plaza in the background

Originally it was to cost IR£250,000, but inflation drove the price of the bridge up nearly fourfold, according to an RTÉ report at the time of opening.

=== Opening ===
The bridge was opened by Lord Mayor of Dublin Michael Collins on 14 February 1978, after which he drove his car across the bridge, becoming the first car to officially cross it. The opening was picketed by residents of City Quay and Westland Row, who had been campaigning for new housing for their "decaying parishes". RTÉ reported that Dublin Corporation aimed to commence house building in City Quay by the end of 1978.

=== Naming ===
The bridge was named in memory of Matt Talbot, a temperance campaigner from Dublin's northside, a statue of whom stands at the south end of the bridge. Other names which had been suggested to Dublin Corporation included the Seán Lemass Bridge, Arthur Griffith Bridge, James Larkin Bridge, and Peace Bridge (in reference to the then-ongoing Troubles in Northern Ireland). Historian Michael J. Tutty, writing in 1981, noted that the decision to name the bridge after Talbot was "a compromise between Dublin Corporation who wished to commemorate the Irish Merchant Seamen who died in the 1939/45 War and those who wished to commemorate the saintly Dublin man, Matt Talbot, who worked nearby." A later entry in the Dublin Historical Record noted that the bridge was opened in honour of Talbot, and to commemorate the Irish Merchant Seamen who died in World War II.

The bridge links Memorial Road (and Custom House Quay) on the north bank of the river to Moss Street (and City Quay) on the south bank. Memorial Road was named in commemoration of those members of the Dublin Brigade who died during the Irish War of Independence - including those who died in a raid on the nearby Custom House.
