= Morell River =

River in County Kildare, Ireland

Coordinates: 53°18′N 6°37′W

River Morell
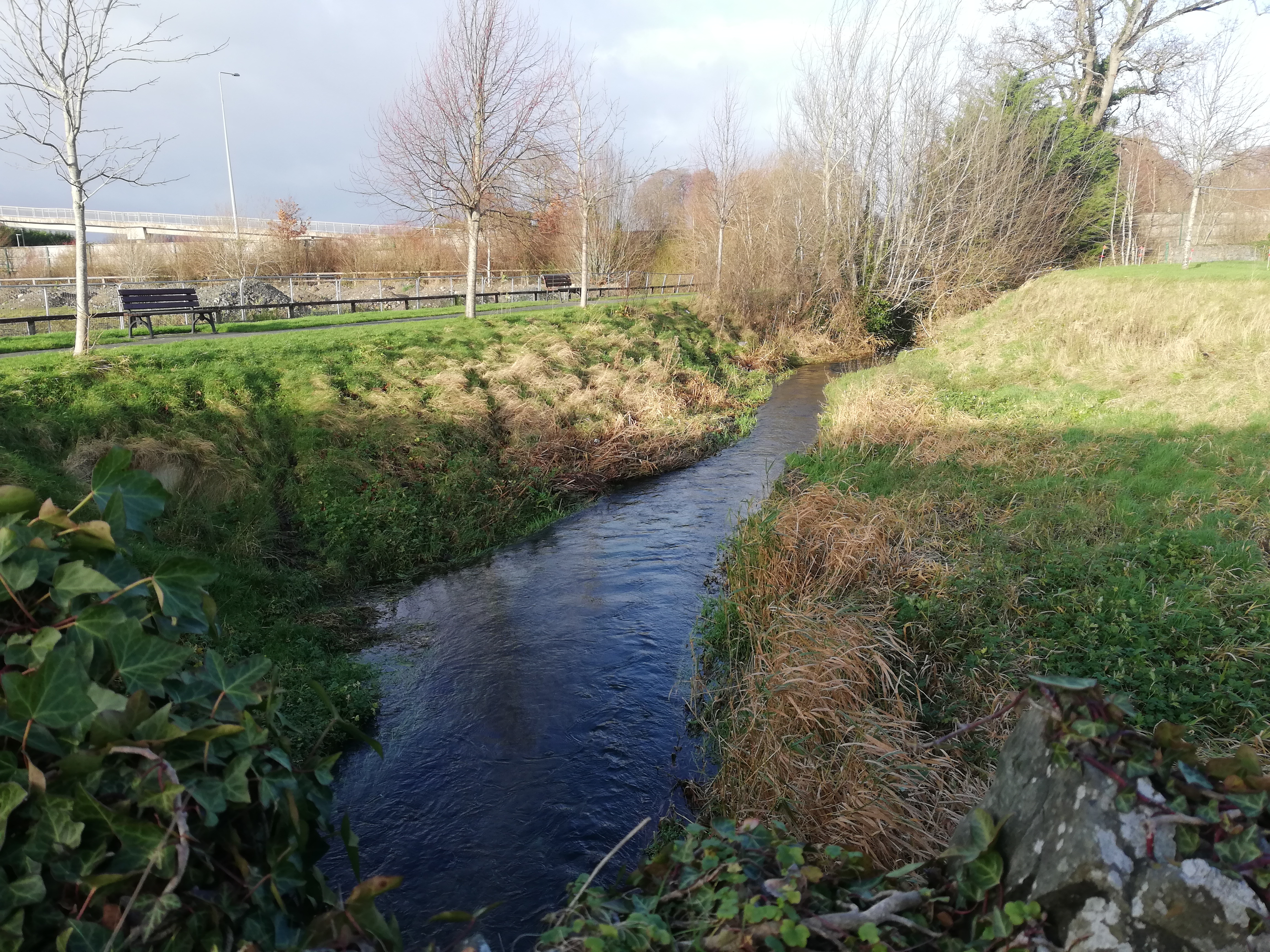
- The Morell in Johnstown
- Native name: An Mhoiréil (Irish)

Location
- Country: Ireland

Physical characteristics
- Source
  - location: Slieveroe, County Kildare
  - elevation: ~146 m (479 ft)
- Mouth
  - location: near Straffan, County Kildare (ultimately the Irish Sea at Dublin Bay via River Liffey)
- Length: ~16 km (9.9 mi)
- Basin size: 98.7 km^{2} (38.1 sq mi)
- Discharge
  - average: 0.279 m^{3}/s (9.9 cu ft/s)

Basin features
- Tributaries
  - right: Painestown River

The Morell River (Irish: An Mhoiréil) is a river in County Kildare, Ireland, a tributary of the River Liffey.

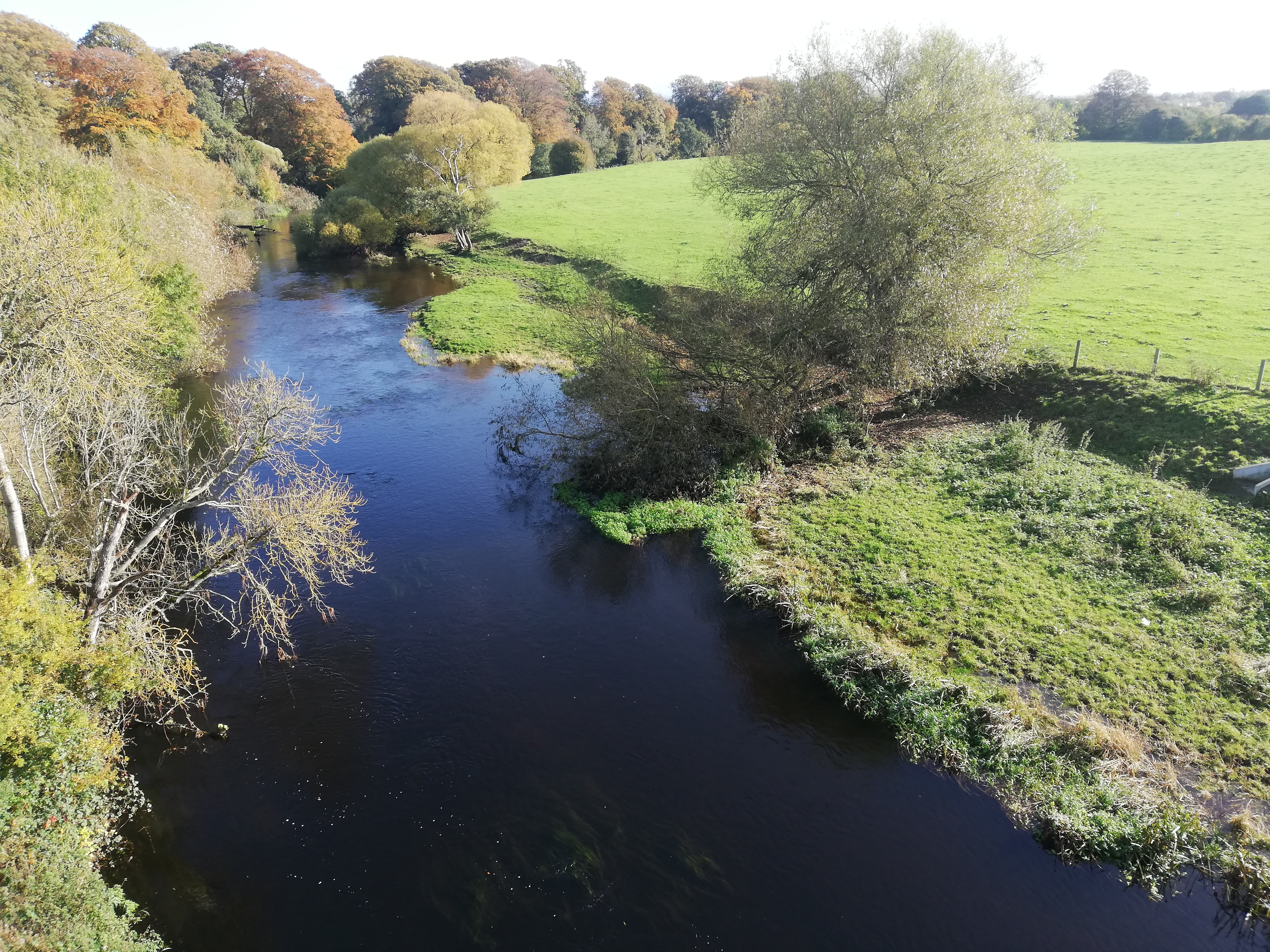
The river in Sherlockstown

== Name ==
The name of the river /məˈrɛl/ derives from William Morrell, formerly a landowner in the area. It first appears (spelled Morrel) in the Statistical Survey of the County of Kildare (1807).

== Course ==
The Morell rises in Slieveroe, a few kilometres west of Blessington Lake. It flows south-to-north through Punchestown Racecourse, passing Craddockstown Golf Club and Naas Industrial Estate. It meets with a tributary stream outside Johnstown, County Kildare and is bridged by the N7 road. It continues northwards and unites with another tributary south of Palmerstown House Golf Club. The Morell then passes under the Grand Canal via an aqueduct and under the Dublin–Cork railway line, then unites with the Painestown River. The combined flow passes under the Morell Bridge, where there is an Environmental Protection Agency monitoring station. The Morell drains into the Liffey about 1 km south of Straffan and about 470 m downstream from the Straffan weir.

== Wildlife ==
There is substantial canopy cover provided by maple sycamore (Acer pseudoplatanus) and European alder (Alnus glutinosa), which allows spawning by the resident population of Brown trout and migratory populations of sea trout (Salmo trutta) and Atlantic salmon (Salmo salar)

A study by the Water Framework Directive Ireland awarded the Morell "Moderate" status for its suitability for macroinvertebrates.
