= Painestown River =

River in County Kildare, Ireland

Coordinates: 53°17′10″N 6°37′07″W

- Native name: Abhainn Bhaile Phaghain (Irish)

Location
- Country: Ireland

Physical characteristics
- Source
  - location: Porterstown, County Kildare
  - elevation: 112 m (367 ft)
- Mouth
  - location: Turnings Upper, County Kildare (ultimately the Irish Sea at Dublin Bay via Morell River and River Liffey)
- Length: 8 km (5.0 mi)
- Basin size: 42.51 km^{2} (16.41 sq mi)
- Discharge
  - average: 1.37 m^{3}/s (48 cu ft/s)

Basin features
- Tributaries
  - left: Kill River
  - right: Slane River

The Painestown River (Irish: Abhainn Baile an Phaghanaigh) is a river in County Kildare, Ireland, a tributary of the Morell River.

== Name ==
The name is derived from the Painestown townland, located in the Kill civil parish.

== Course ==
Painestown River rises in Porterstown, Kilteel. It flows northwestwards, passing under the N7 road at Blackhill. In Painestown it meets two tributaries, the Kill River and the Slane River. The Painestown River continues due north, then passes under the Grand Canal at the Painestown River Aqueduct and passes under the Dublin–Cork railway line in Baronrath. It is then crossed by the Killeenmore Bridge and drains into the Morell River in Turnings Upper, south of Straffan.

== See also ==
- Rivers of Ireland
