= Loopline Bridge =

Bridge over the River Liffey in Ireland

Loopline Bridge Droichead na Lúblíne
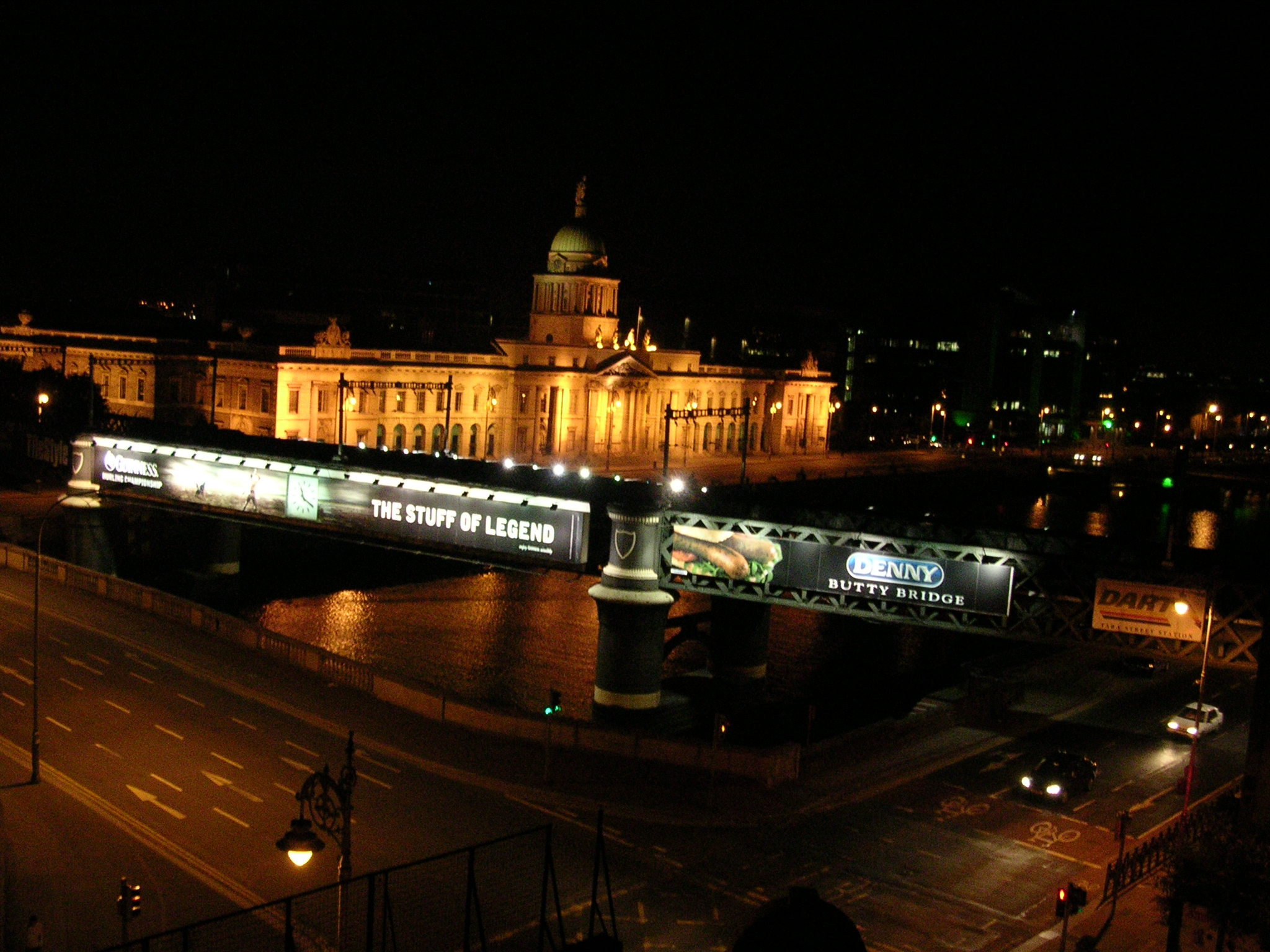
- Loopline bridge at night (prior to removal of advertising hoardings), with Butt Bridge in the foreground, and Custom House in the background
- Coordinates: 53.3480°N 6.2546°W
- Carries: Railway
- Crosses: River Liffey and quays
- Locale: Dublin, Ireland
- Other name: Liffey Viaduct
- Maintained by: Iarnród Éireann
- Preceded by: Butt Bridge
- Followed by: Talbot Memorial Bridge

Characteristics
- Material: Cast iron, wrought iron, limestone (viaduct piers)

History
- Designer: John Chaloner Smith
- Construction end: 1891

Location
- Interactive map of Loopline Bridge

The Loopline Bridge (or the Liffey Viaduct, Irish: Droichead na Lúblíne) is a railway bridge spanning the River Liffey and several streets in Dublin, Ireland. It joins rail services from south of Dublin to Connolly Station and lines north.

Designed by John Chaloner Smith (engineer to the Dublin, Wicklow and Wexford Railway), the bridge was built between 1889 and 1891. It consists of wrought iron lattice girders on a double row of piers with five spans. The viaduct is approximately six metres above street level and supports two railway tracks.

During original planning and construction (in the late 19th century) the project was subject to much opposition and controversy, because the structure blocks the view down river to the Custom House. However, the bridge was deemed necessary as a rail link between north and south Dublin, and to facilitate the movement of transatlantic mail coming from Kingstown (Dún Laoghaire) and Queenstown (Cobh).

100 years later, the visage of the bridge remains the subject of some debate, and has been described by historian Richard Killeen as "one of the city's true eyesores". Already arguably less attractive than some of Dublin's other bridges, the façades of the Loopline have been used by Iarnród Éireann for billboard advertising. As of 2006, the company has scaled back the bridge's use for this purpose to reduce impact on the city skyline, following input from An Bord Pleanála and Dublin City Council.

A prominent feature in the city landscape since 1891, the Loopline Bridge appears in one of the most famous literary works associated with Dublin:

A skiff, a crumpled throwaway, Elijah is coming, rode lightly down the Liffey, under Loopline bridge, shooting the rapids where water chafed around the bridgepiers, sailing eastward past hulls and anchorchains, between the Customhouse old dock and George’s quay.

— James Joyce, Ulysses

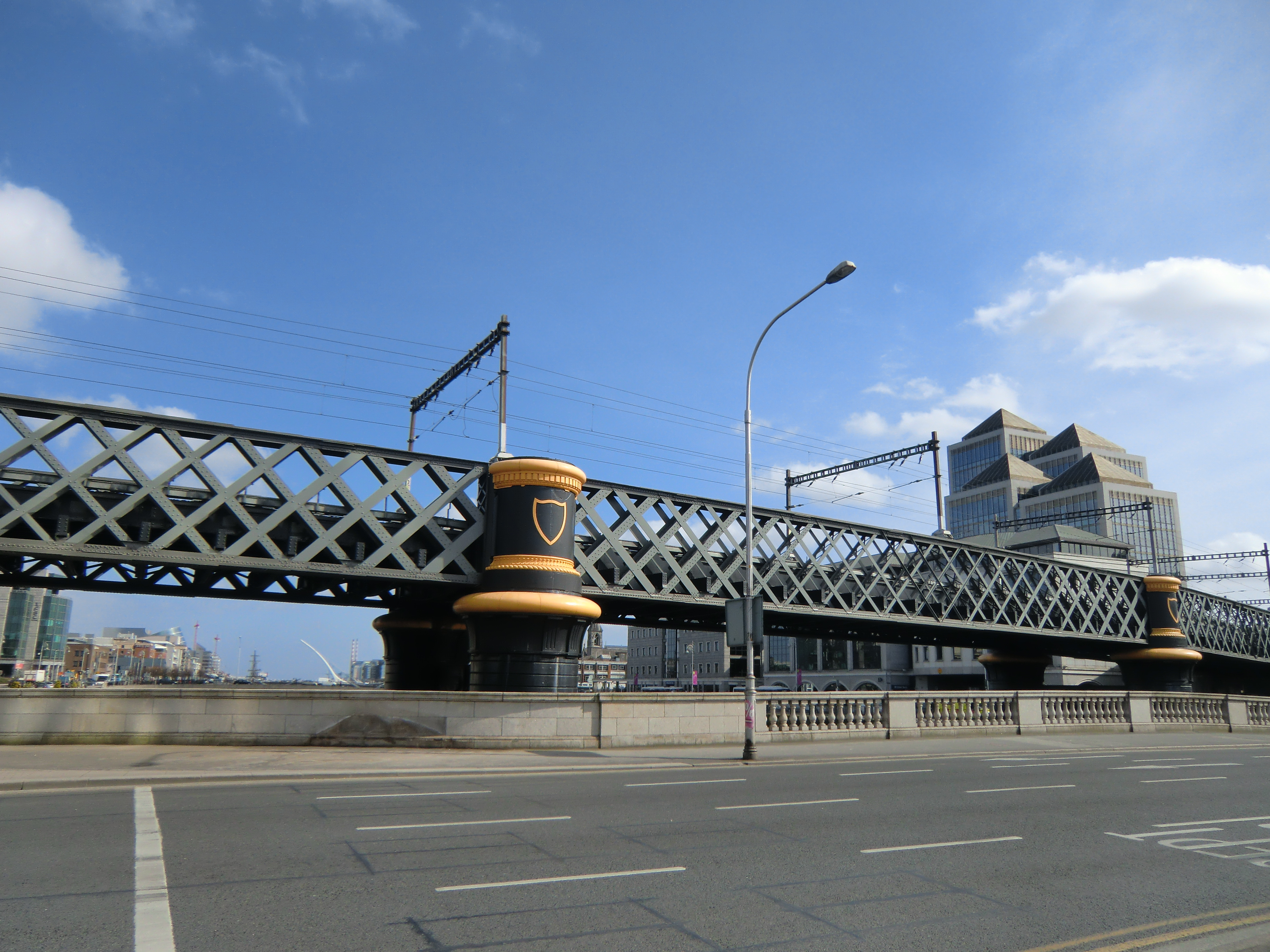
Loopline Bridge, view from Butt Bridge

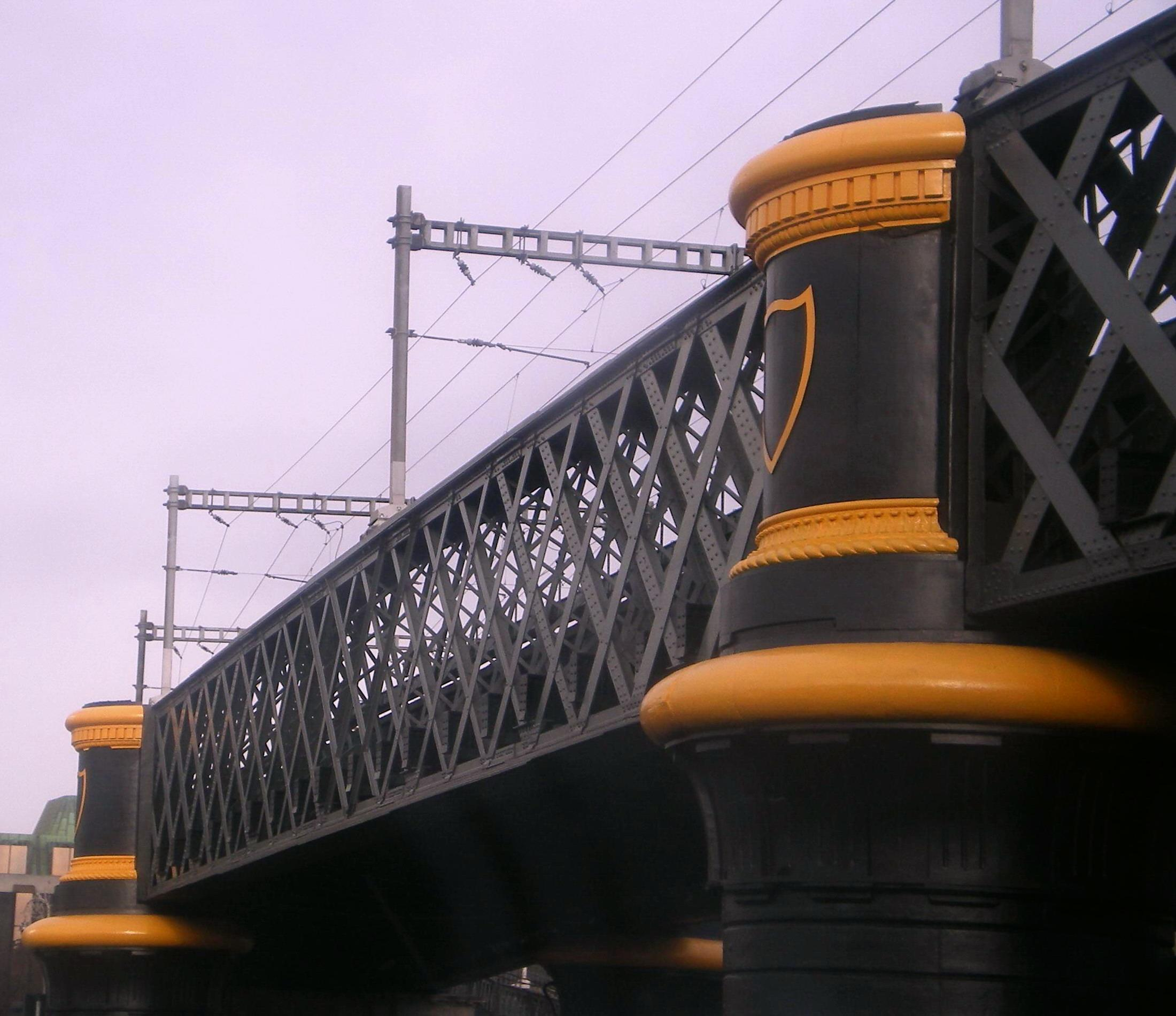
Detail of the Liffey Viaduct
