= Seán O'Casey Bridge =

Bridge over the River Liffey in Ireland

Seán O'Casey Bridge Droichead Sheáin Uí Chathasaigh
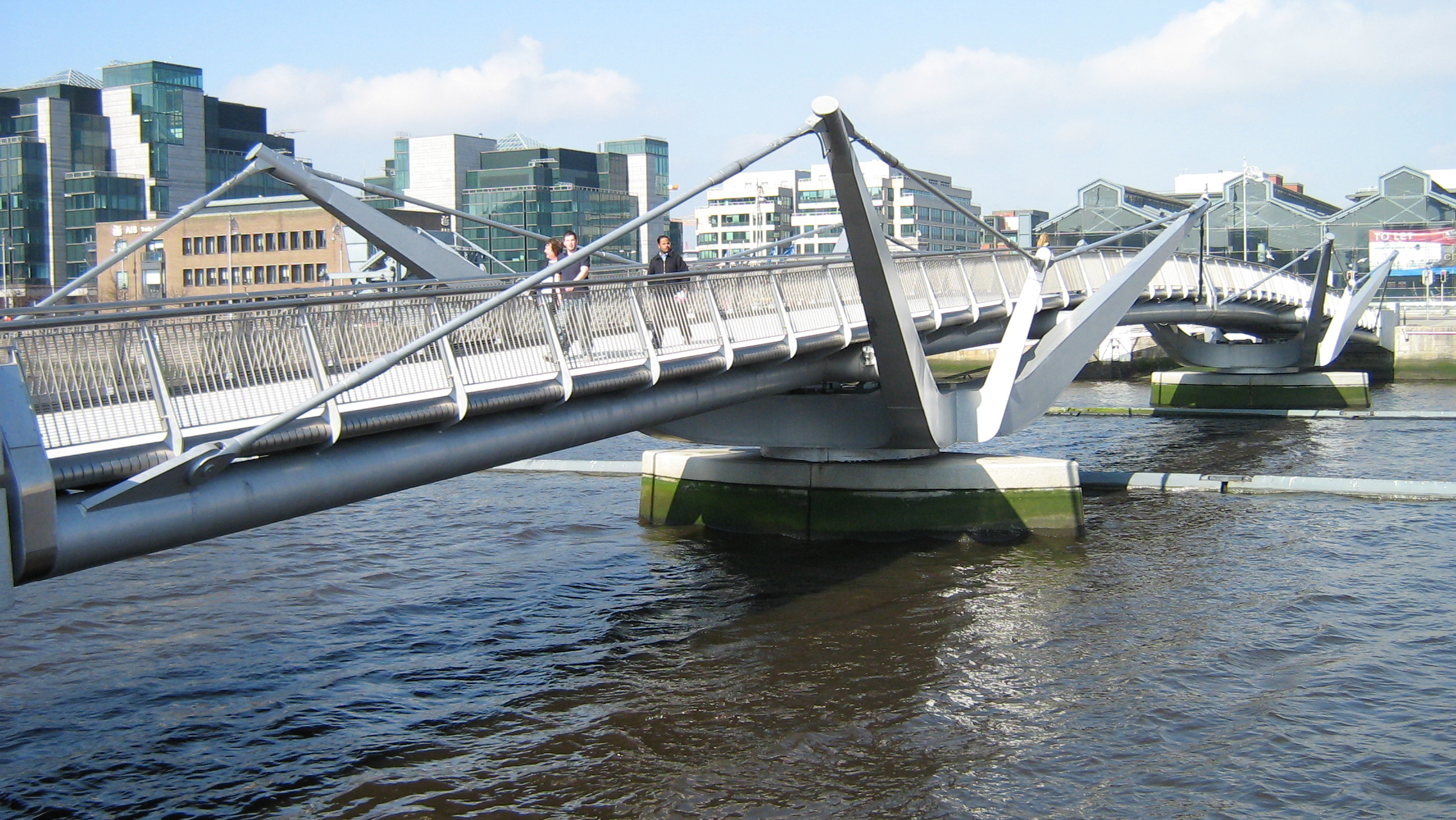
- Seán O'Casey Bridge, Dublin
- Coordinates: 53.3473°N 6.2480°W
- Crosses: River Liffey
- Locale: Dublin, Ireland
- Preceded by: Talbot Memorial Bridge
- Followed by: Samuel Beckett Bridge

Characteristics
- Design: Cable-stayed swing bridge
- Total length: 97.61 metres (320.2 ft)
- Width: 4.54 metres (14.9 ft)
- No. of spans: 3

History
- Designer: Brian O'Hallaran & Assoc (Architects), O'Connor Sutton Cronin (Engineers)
- Opened: 13 July 2005

Seán O'Casey Bridge (Irish: Droichead Sheáin Uí Chathasaigh) is a pedestrian swingbridge spanning the River Liffey in Dublin, Ireland, joining City Quay in the Grand Canal Docks area to North Wall Quay and the IFSC.

Designed by architect Cyril O'Neill and O'Connor Sutton Cronin Consulting Engineers (for which they won an Institution of Structural Engineers Award for Pedestrian Bridges in 2006), the bridge was built in 2005 as part of a large-scale urban renewal scheme under the Dublin Docklands Development Authority to link the north and south quays and rejuvenate both. The swing bridge spans approximately 100 metres and has two balanced cantilever arms that swing open to permit boats to pass upriver. Around 2010 the remote control that operates the swing bridge was misplaced, and the bridge was unable to be opened until a new remote controller was reprogrammed in 2014.

The bridge was opened by Taoiseach Bertie Ahern in July 2005. It is named after the playwright and Irish Citizen Army member Seán O'Casey (1880–1964) who lived in the North Wall area of the city.
