= Desmond Rea O'Kelly =

Irish architect (1923–2011)

Desmond Rea O’Kelly (7 November 1923 – 18 February 2011) was the architect of Liberty Hall in Dublin. Liberty Hall was formerly the tallest office building in Ireland, rising to 59.4 metres (195 feet). Technologically innovative for late 1950s Ireland, the building was largely constructed in reinforced concrete.

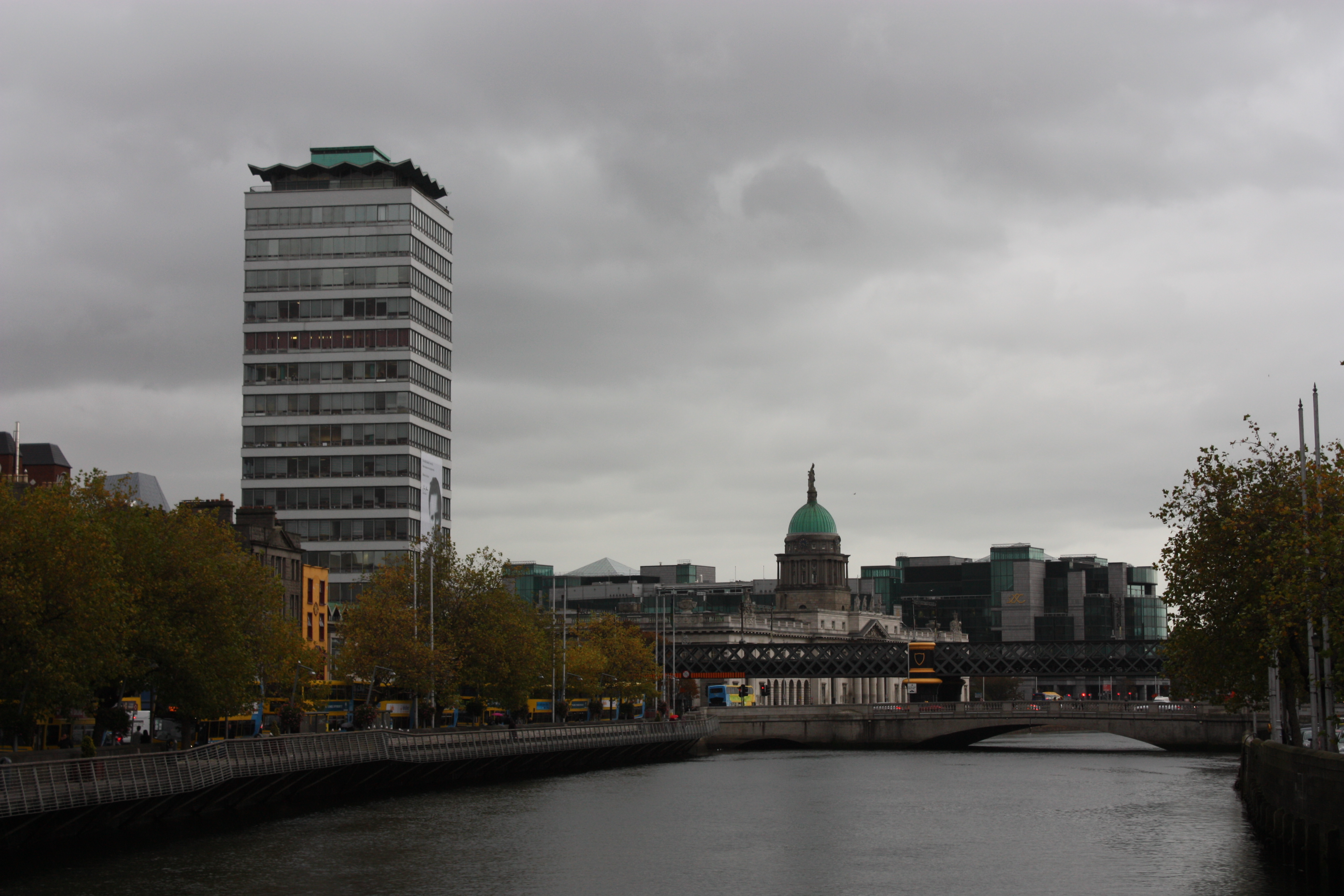
Liberty Hall, Dublin, October 2010

He graduated from University College Dublin with a BE in civil engineering in 1945. In 1977, he was admitted to membership of the Royal Institute of the Architects of Ireland (RIAI) and was elected a fellow in 2002. He was also elected to fellowship at the Institution of Engineers of Ireland in 1985. In later years, he was commissioned by Dublin Tourism to carry out work on Malahide Castle, ingeniously strengthening its Georgian staircase in a way that could not be seen. He also worked on the Dublin Writers Museum in Parnell Square, where he managed to save plasterwork that had become saturated from the activities of thieves and vandals.

In addition to architecture, Desmond Rea O’Kelly was also involved with golf.
