= Butt Bridge =

Bridge over the River Liffey in Ireland

Butt Bridge Droichead Bhutt
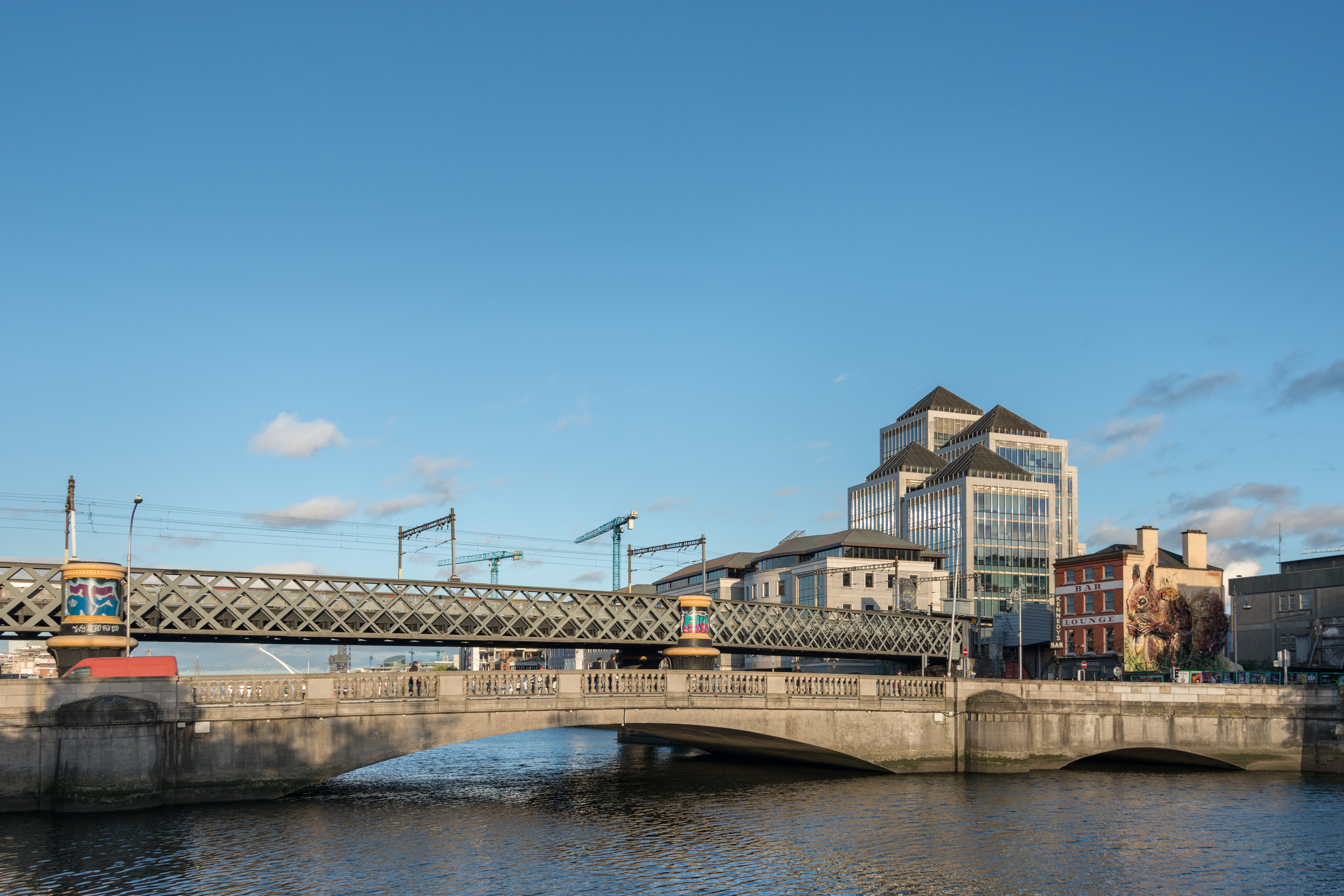
- Butt Bridge, with Loopline Bridge behind it
- Coordinates: 53.347778°N 6.255°W
- Crosses: River Liffey
- Locale: Dublin, Ireland
- Preceded by: Rosie Hackett Bridge
- Followed by: Loopline Bridge

Characteristics
- Material: Concrete
- Total length: ~65m
- Width: ~20m

History
- Designer: Bindon Blood Stoney (1879)
- Construction start: 1877
- Construction end: 1932

The Butt Bridge (Irish: Droichead na Comhdhála, meaning 'Congress Bridge') is a road bridge in Dublin, Ireland which spans the River Liffey and joins Georges Quay to Beresford Place and the north quays at Liberty Hall.

== History ==
=== 1879 swing bridge ===
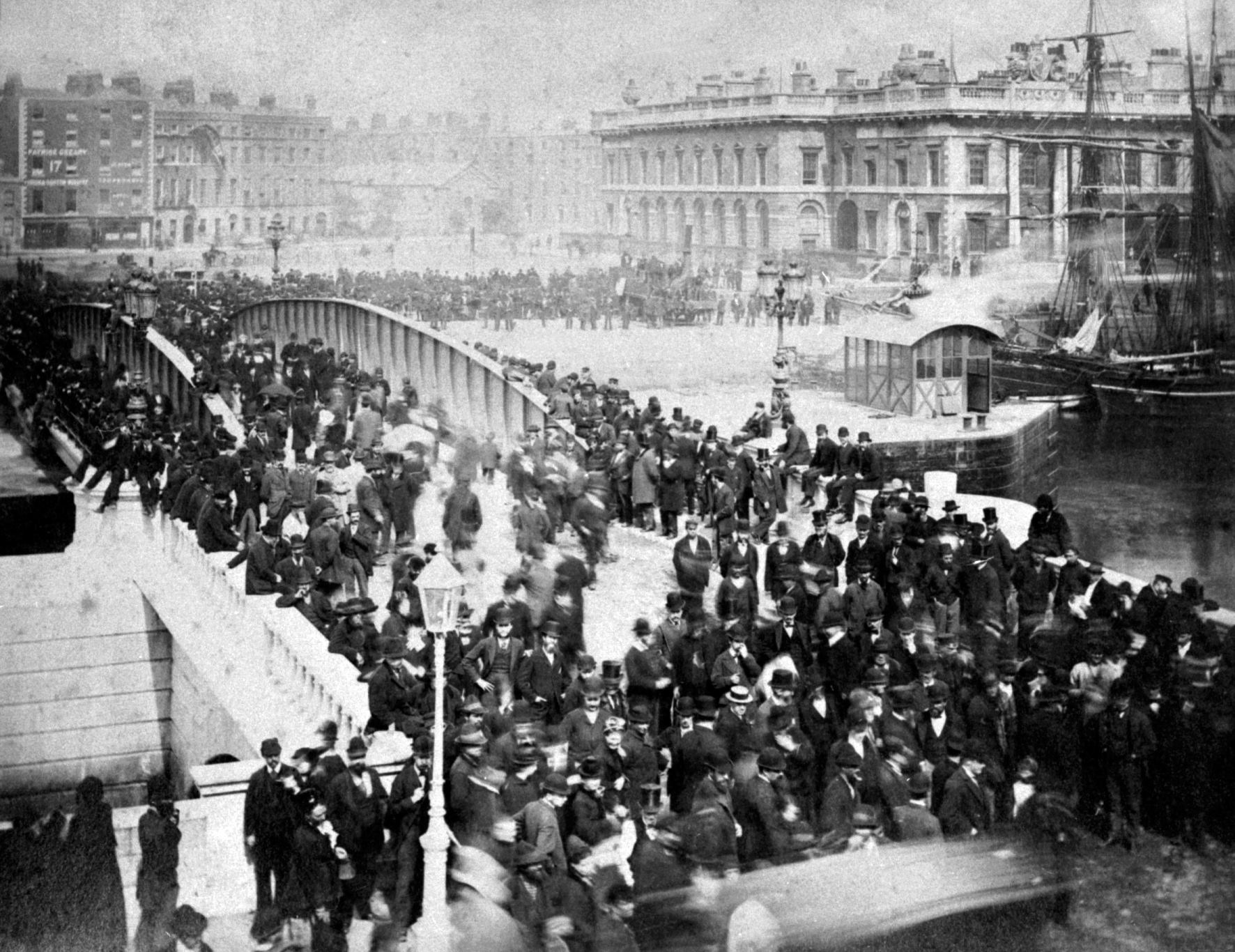
Opening of Beresford swing bridge (1879)

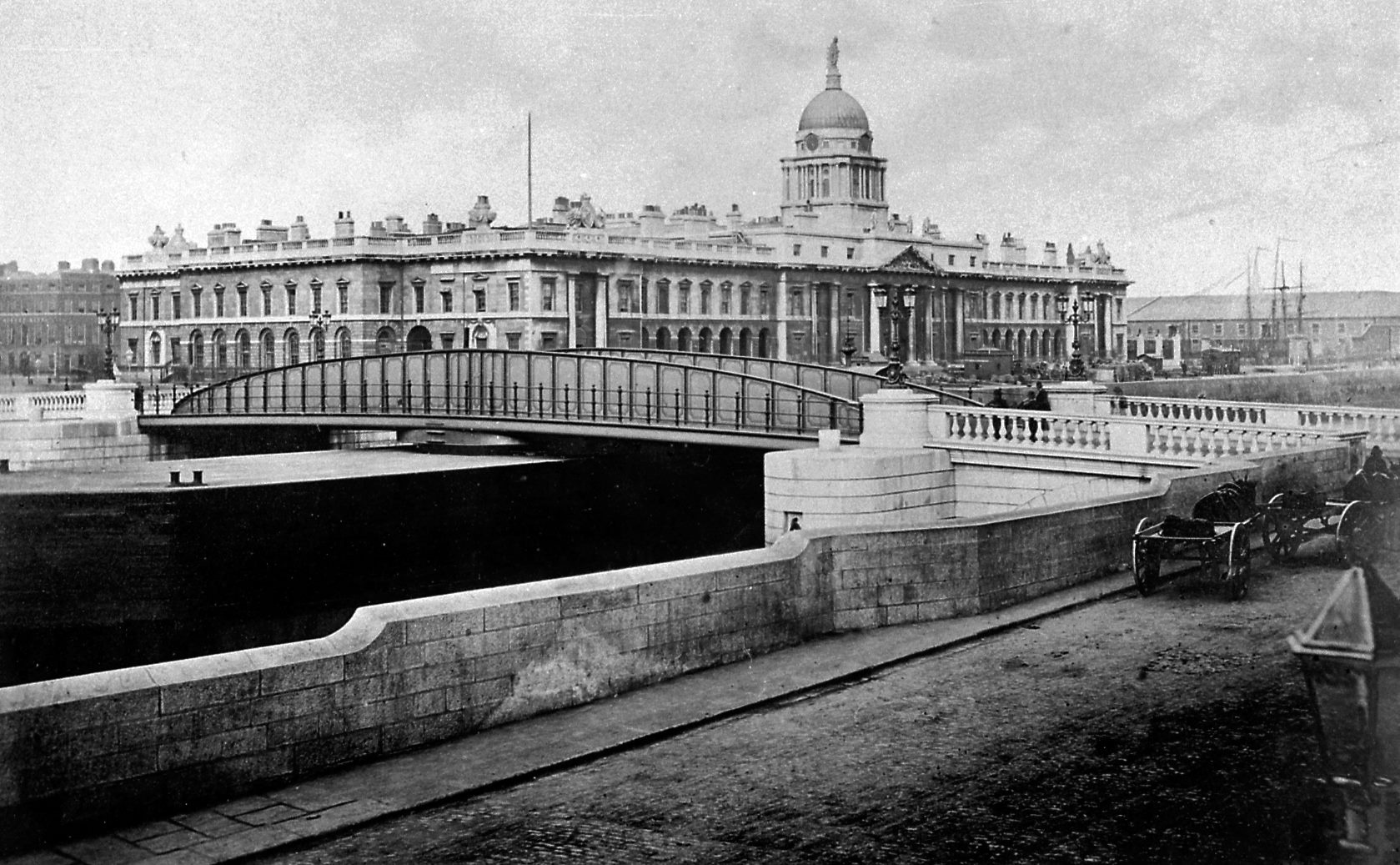
Custom House and Butt bridge sometime between 1879-91

The original bridge on this site was a structural steel swing bridge, designed by Bindon Blood Stoney, opened on 26 August 1879 and named after Isaac Butt (who died that year), leader of the Home Rule movement.

The swing section, made of wrought iron and weighing 200 tons, ran on a series of cast-spoke wheels and was powered by a steam engine, which was housed on a timber pier on the downstream side of the bridge. The swing action allowed boats to pass and berth in the river as far upstream as Carlisle Bridge (now O'Connell Bridge).

The bridge was overshadowed by the construction of the Loopline Bridge between 1889-91.

=== 1932 concrete bridge ===
In 1932, the swing bridge was replaced with a three-span fixed structure of reinforced concrete, but retained its original English name. The Irish name of the bridge however, Droichead na Comhdhála or "Congress Bridge", derives from the Eucharistic Congress of 1932 which was held in Dublin that year.

The central span of the current bridge is formed by two cantilevered sections, with the two approach spans acting as counterweights. This model represented the first use in reinforced concrete of a cantilevered and counterweight construction in either Britain or Ireland.
