= River Liffey =

Irish river

- Boardwalks on the Liffey from O'Connell Bridge, in Dublin

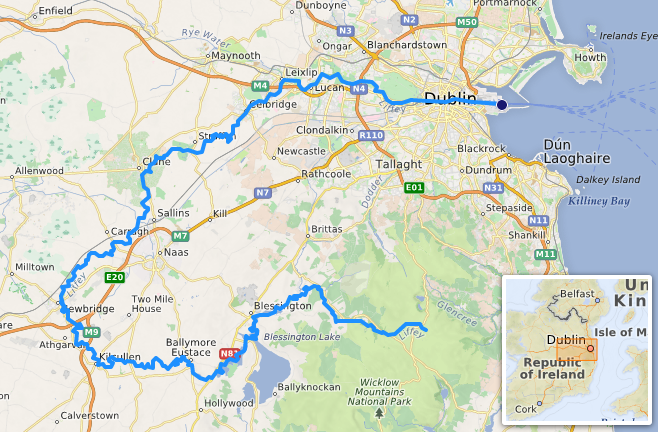

Location
- Country: Ireland
- Counties: Wicklow, Kildare, Dublin

Physical characteristics
- Source: Kippure
  - location: Sally Gap, County Wicklow
  - coordinates: 53°09′22″N 6°17′17″W
  - elevation: 500 m (1,600 ft)
- Mouth: Dublin Bay, Irish Sea
  - location: Dublin
  - coordinates: 53.343316°N 6.181303°W
  - elevation: 0 m (0 ft)
- Length: 132 km (82 mi)
- Basin size: 1,256 km^{2} (485 sq mi)
- Discharge
  - average: Annual: 13.8 m^{3}/s (490 cu ft/s); Aug: 3.7 m^{3}/s (130 cu ft/s); Dec: 29.8 m^{3}/s (1,050 cu ft/s)

Basin features
- Tributaries
  - left: Ballylow Brook, King's River, Lemonstown Stream, Kilcullen Stream, Pinkeen Stream, Rye Water, Silleachain Stream, Furry Glen Stream, Magazine Stream, Finisk Stream, Bradogue River
  - right: Sraghoe, Cransillagh, Athdown Brook, Shankill River, Brittas River, Morell River, Griffeen River, Glenaulin Stream, Creosote Stream, Camac River, River Poddle, Stein River, River Dodder

The River Liffey (Irish: An Life, historically An Ruirthe(a)ch) is a river in eastern Ireland that ultimately flows through the centre of Dublin to its mouth within Dublin Bay. Its major tributaries include the River Dodder, the River Poddle and the River Camac. The river supplies much of Dublin's water and supports a range of recreational activities.

== Name ==
While Ptolemy's Geography (2nd century AD) describes a river which he labels Οβοκα (Oboka), this is not the Liffey: ultimately it leads to the name of the River Avoca in County Wicklow.

According to "Place Names from our Older Literature - IV." by Boswell, C. S. (1904 Connradh na Gaedhilge) the river takes its name from Magh Life, i.e. the plain of Kildare through which the Life flows. This in turn takes its name from Life, daughter of Canann Curthach, who eloped with and married Deltbanna mac Druchta, cup-bearer to Conaire Mór High King of Ireland. Life took a liking to this plain, and demanded that it should bear her name, and Deltbanna refused to serve any more drink to the men of Éire till the request was granted.

The Liffey was previously named An Ruirthech, meaning "fast (or strong) runner". The word Liphe (or Life) referred originally to the name of the plain through which the river ran, but eventually came to refer to the river itself. The word may derive from the same root as Welsh llif (flood, flow, stream), namely Proto-Indo-European lē̆i-4, referring to the historic propensity of areas such as Phoenix Park in Dublin and Waterstown Park in Palmerstown to be inundated, but Gearóid Mac Eoin has more recently proposed that it may derive from a non-Indo-European word borrowed from the original language spoken in Ireland before the arrival of the Celts. It was also known as the Anna Liffey, possibly from an anglicisation of Abhainn na Life, the Irish phrase that translates into English as "River Liffey". James Joyce embodies the river in Finnegans Wake as "Anna Livia Plurabelle".

== Course and system ==
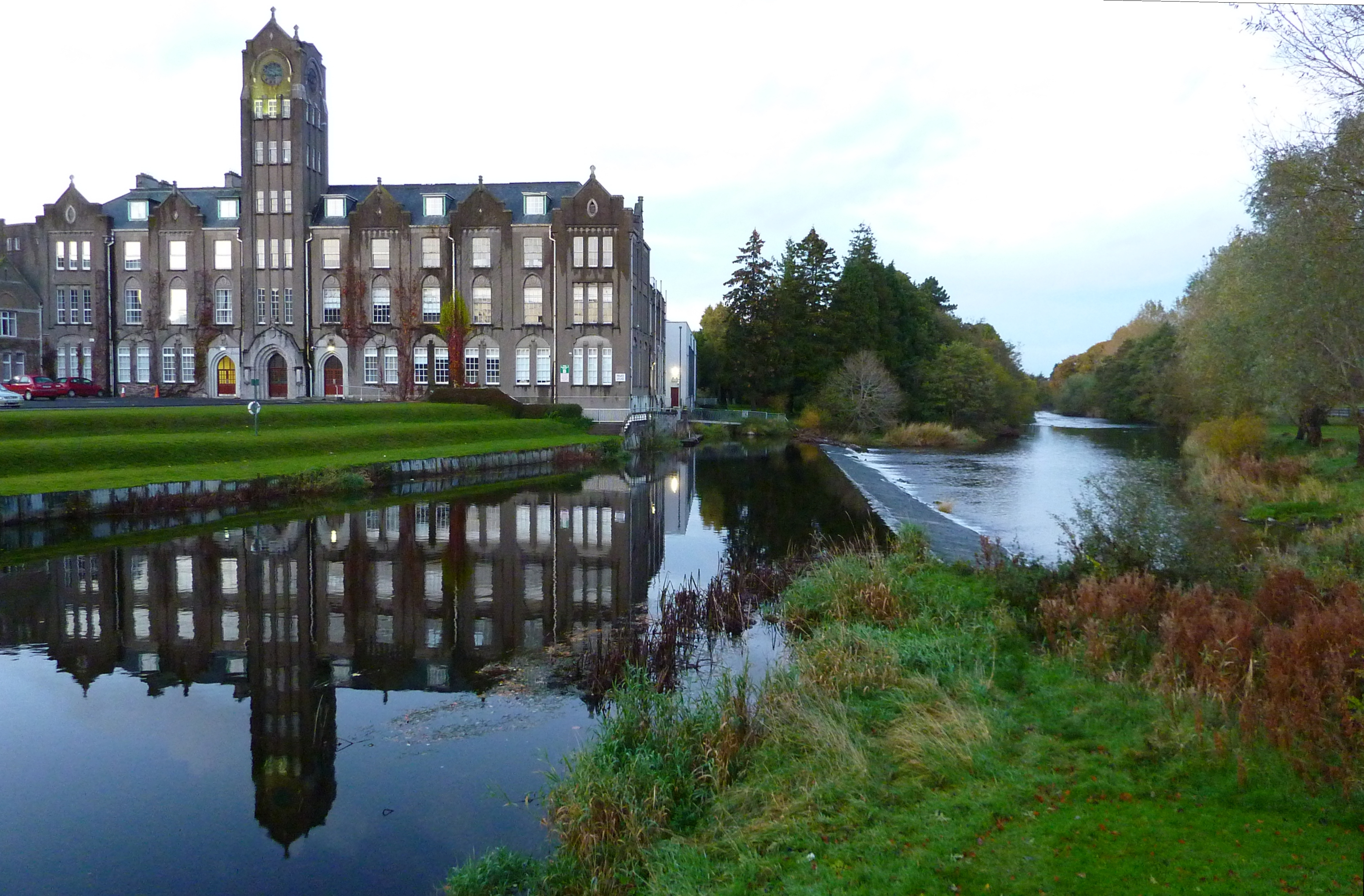
The River Liffey flowing through Newbridge College in County Kildare

The Liffey rises in the Liffey Head Bog between the mountains of Kippure 742 metres (2,434 ft) and Tonduff 642 metres (2,106 ft) in the northern section of the Wicklow Mountains, forming from many streamlets near the Sally Gap. It flows for 132 km (82 mi) through counties Wicklow, Kildare and Dublin before entering the Irish Sea at its mouth at the midpoint of Dublin Bay, on a line extending from the Baily lighthouse to the Muglin Rocks. It crosses from County Wicklow into County Kildare at Poulaphouca and from County Kildare into County Dublin at Leixlip, with the greatest part of its length being in Kildare.

The catchment area of the Liffey is 1,256 km^{2} (485 sq mi). The long term average flow rate of the river is 18.0 m^{3}/s (640 cu ft/s).

=== Tributaries ===
The Liffey system includes dozens of smaller rivers and more than 100 named streams. Early tributaries include the Athdown Brook, Shankill River, Ballylow Brook, Brittas River and Woodend Brook. The substantial King's River, which formerly joined the Liffey near Blessington, and may in fact have held the larger flow, now merges in within Poulaphouca Reservoir.

Downstream of Poulaphouca are the Lemonstown Stream, Kilcullen Stream and Pinkeen Stream, followed by the Painestown River (with tributaries including the Morell River), the Rye Water (with tributaries including the Lyreen) at Leixlip, and the Griffeen River and Silleachain Stream in Lucan.

Within Dublin are the various Phoenix Park streams on the left bank, interspersed with right bank tributaries such as the Glenaulin Stream and Creosote Stream.

Within the quays area tributaries include the River Camac, possibly Colman's Brook, the Bradogue River, River Poddle, Stein River and the River Dodder, some of which have numerous tributaries of their own.

In earlier times, the River Tolka was also arguably a tributary of the Liffey or at least shared its mouth, but it now enters Dublin Bay distinctly, some distance to the north.

=== Dams, reservoirs and falls ===
There are dams for three ESB hydroelectric power stations along the river, at Poulaphouca, Golden Falls and Leixlip. Major reservoir facilities also exist at Poulaphouca. The Liffey does not feature natural lakes and has few islands.

Significant falls at Poulaphouca and at Golden Falls were flooded by reservoir construction. There remain areas of rapids, including as the river approaches Dublin city.

=== Settlements ===
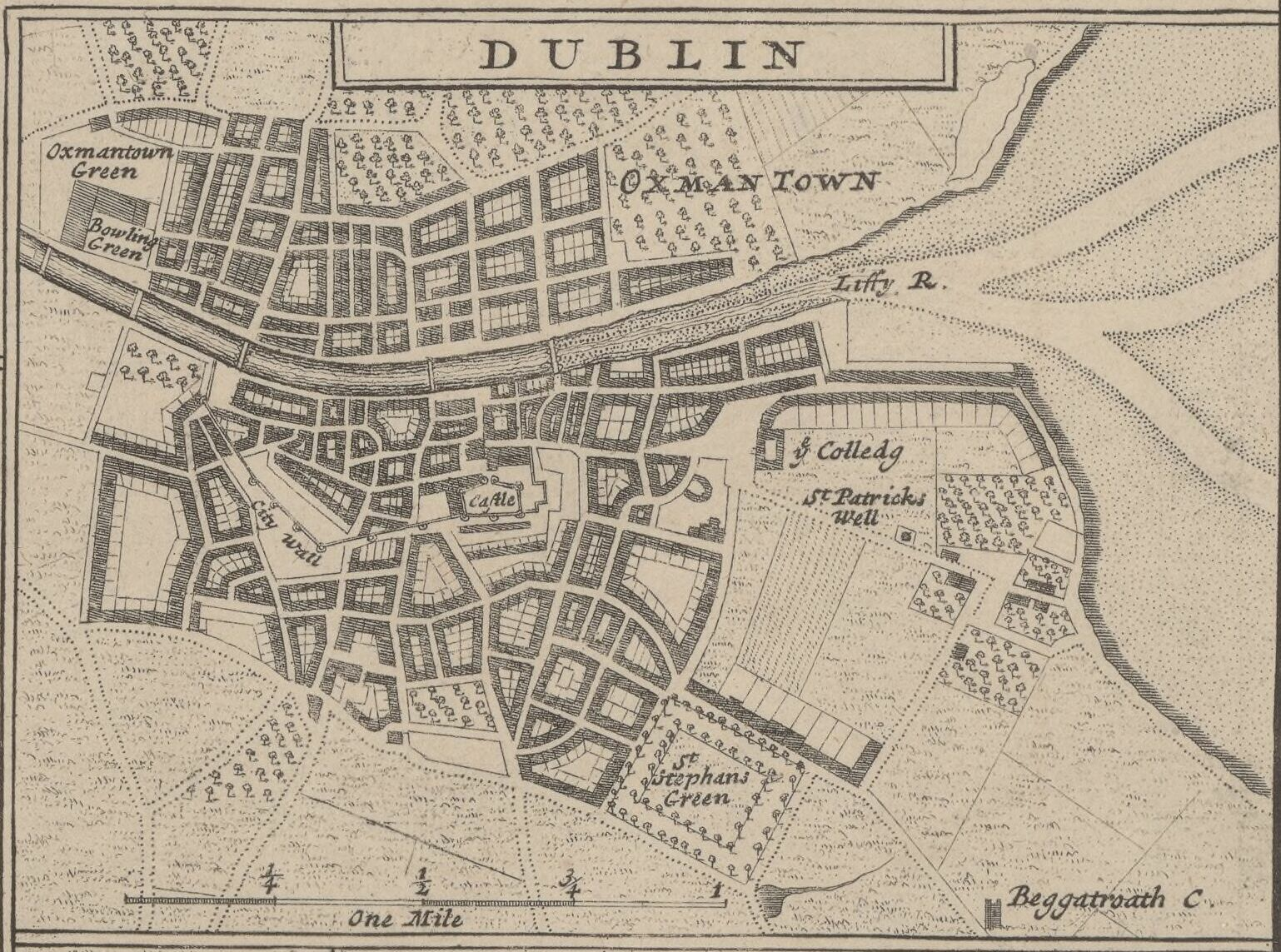
The Liffey separating Dublin from Oxmantown on a 1714 map by Herman Moll

Towns along the river include Blessington, Ballymore Eustace, Kilcullen, Athgarvan, Newbridge, Caragh, Clane, Celbridge, Leixlip and Lucan before the river passes the suburb of Chapelizod and then runs through the city of Dublin all the way to its mouth.

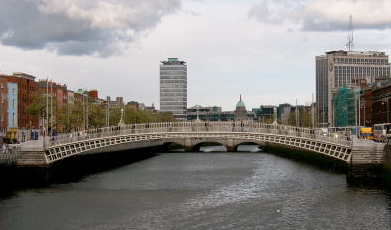
The Ha'penny Bridge.

== Navigation and uses ==
The River Liffey in Dublin city has been used for many centuries for trade, from the Viking beginnings of the city up to recent times. It is connected to the River Shannon via the Grand Canal and the Royal Canal. There is no major navigation on the river itself above the East-Link bridge in modern times, but shipping used to enter Dublin city centre, with major docking points up to the St James' Gate area.

Since its construction in 1978, the Talbot Memorial Bridge marks the furthest point up to the Liffey to which tall ships may travel, as all bridges downriver of it are either swingbridges or bascule.

=== Water supply ===
Around 60% of the Liffey's flow is abstracted for drinking water and to supply industry. Much of this makes its way back into the river after purification in wastewater treatment plants. Despite a misconception that the Guinness brewery is one such commercial user, the facility uses water piped from the Wicklow Mountains.

=== Electricity generation ===
ESB hydroelectric power stations exist along the river, at Poulaphouca, Golden Falls and Leixlip, in addition to a number of minor private installations.

=== Traffic ===
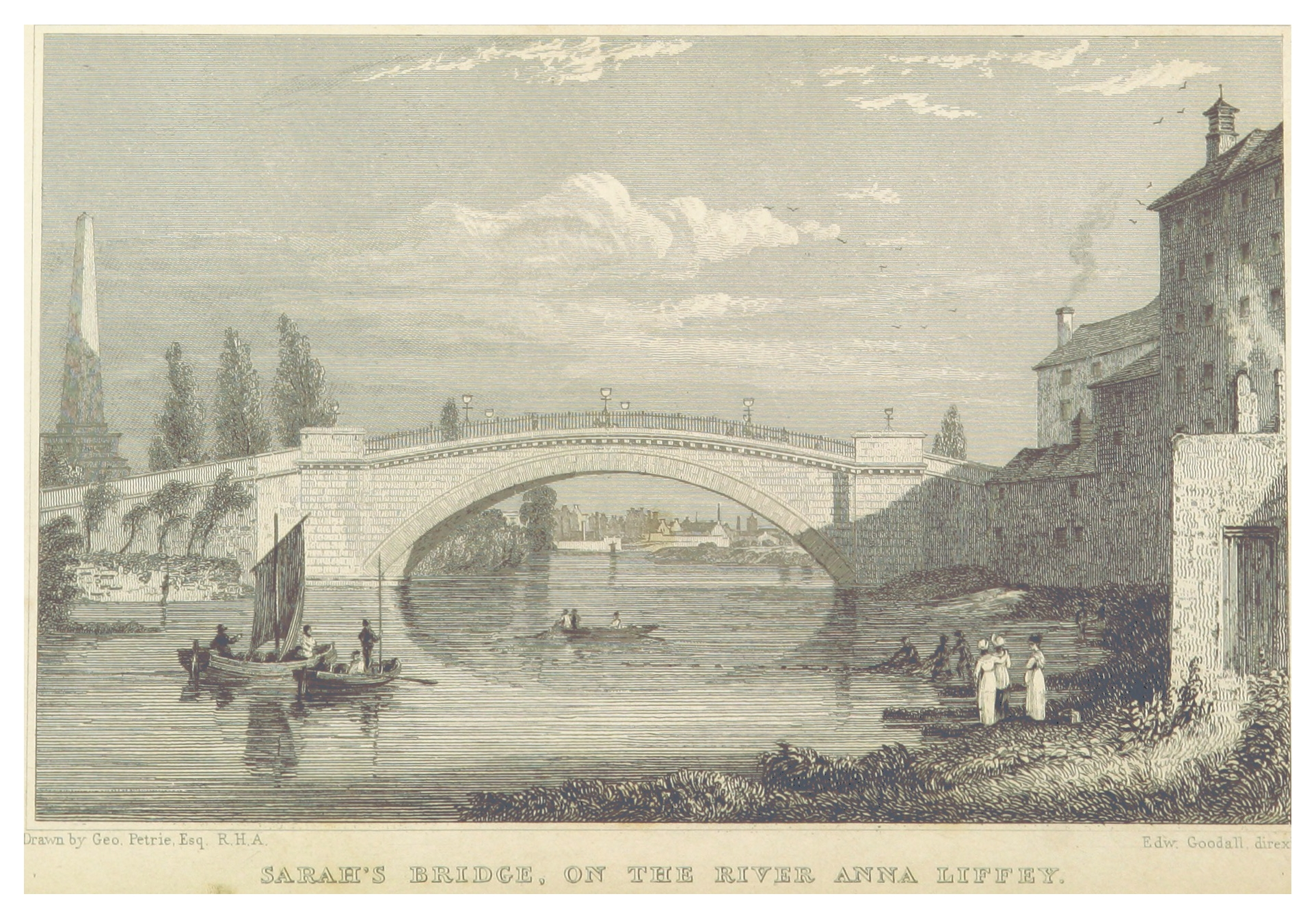
"Sarah's Bridge on the River Anna Liffey" (1831) Sarah's Bridge is today called Island Bridge. The Wellington Monument, then relatively new, is seen on the left

A well-known sight on the Liffey up to the 1990s, the Lady Patricia and Miranda Guinness cargo ships were used to export Guinness from the St. James's Gate Brewery.

As of the early 21st century, the only regular traffic on the river within the city is the Liffey Voyage water tour bus service, which runs guided tours along the River Liffey through Dublin City centre. Departing from the boardwalk downstream of the Ha'penny Bridge, the Spirit of the Docklands was built by Westers Mekaniska in Sweden as a 50-passenger water taxi. Its variable ballast tanks (not unlike a submarine) and low air draught mean that at low tide it can float high, but at high tide it can ride low and still pass below the Liffey's bridges.

Downstream of the East-Link bridge, the river is still mainly used for commercial and ferry traffic, with some recreational use also. High speed trips out the mouth of the Liffey were also previously available from Sea Safari.

=== Recreational use ===
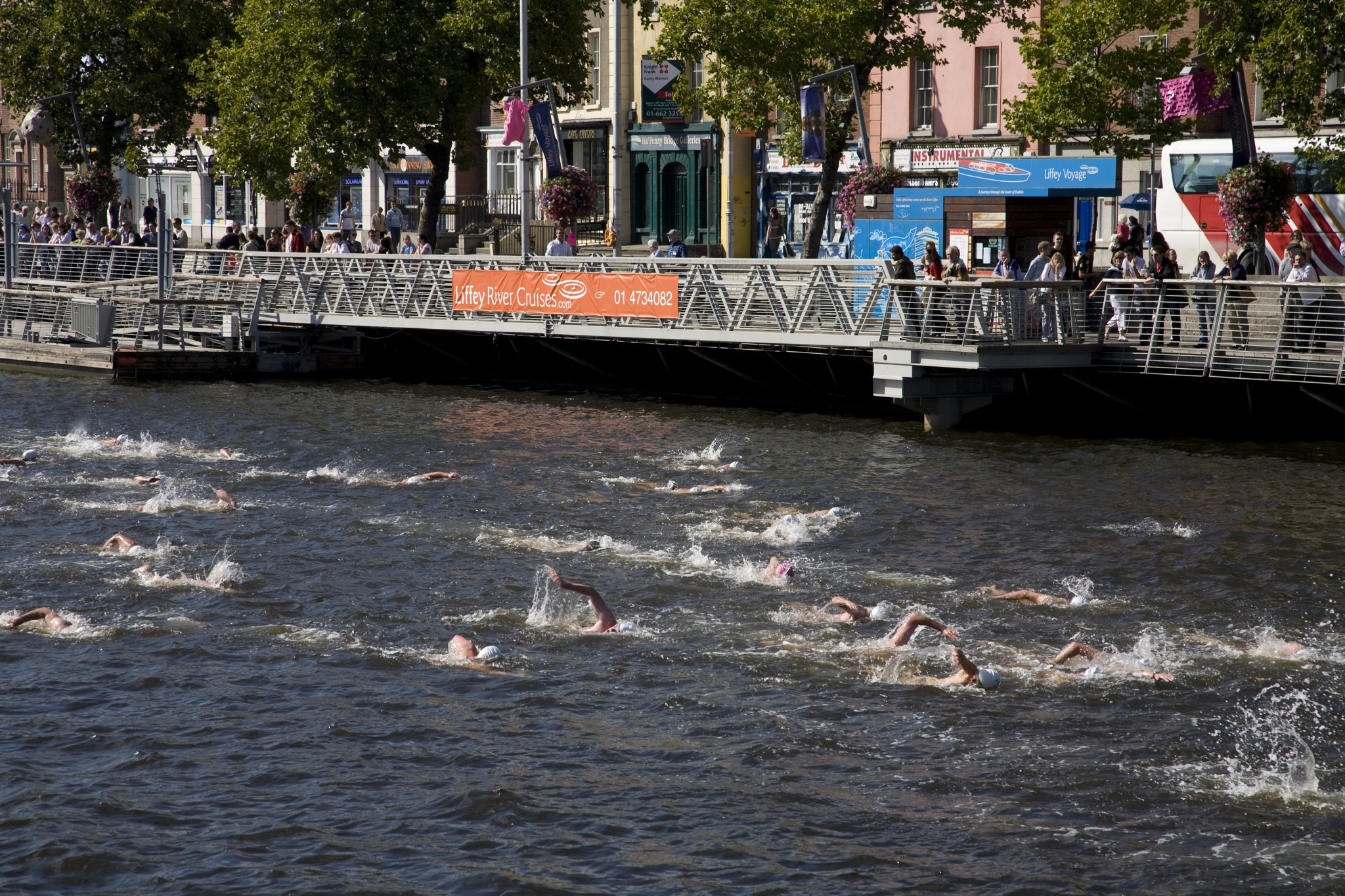
The 2007 Liffey Swim passes the Liffey Boardwalk

Upstream from the city, at Chapelizod, the river is used by private, university and Garda rowing clubs.

The Liffey Descent Canoe Race, held each year since 1960, covers a 27 km (17 mi) course from Straffan to Islandbridge. The Normal Tidal Limit (NTL) of the river is Islandbridge (weir). The Liffey Swim takes place every year in late August or early September between Watling Bridge and the Custom House. The Islandbridge stretch of river accommodates a number of rowing clubs including Trinity College, UCD, Commercial, Neptune, and the Garda rowing club.

The Liffey is widely used for recreational activities – such as canoeing, rafting, fishing, swimming, significant facilities are at Poulaphouca, Kilcullen, Newbridge, where a seven-acre Liffey Linear Park has been developed, and other facilities are located further downriver at Leixlip and other towns.

== Crossings ==
=== History ===
The earliest stone bridge over the Liffey in Dublin of which there is solid evidence was the Bridge of Dublin, which replaced a wooden bridge, Dubhghall's Bridge, dating to the 11th century, and was in turn replaced – the site is now occupied by Fr. Mathew Bridge). The Bridge of Dublin was built by the Dominicans in 1428, and survived well into the 18th century. This four-arch bridge included various buildings such as a chapel, bakehouse and possibly an inn. Island Bridge (a predecessor of the current bridge) was added in 1577 at the upper tidal extremities of the river between Islandbridge and western Chapelizod.

With the development of commercial Dublin in the 17th century, four new bridges were added in Dublin between 1670 and 1684: Barrack, or Bloody Bridge, (the forerunner of the current Rory O'More Bridge), Essex Bridge (Grattan Bridge), Ormond Bridge (O'Donovan Rossa Bridge) and Arran Bridge. Flooding in December 1801 following 36 hours of rain destroyed the oldest bridge which connected Church Street and Bridge Street. It was replaced with Whitworth Bridge in 1816.

The oldest bridge still standing is Mellows Bridge, (originally Queens Bridge) constructed in 1764 on the site of Arran Bridge, which was destroyed by floods in 1763. The first iron bridge was the Ha'penny Bridge built in 1816. Farmleigh Bridge, also iron, was built around 1872 at the end of a tunnel and connected Farmleigh estate to Palmerstown.

The Millennium Bridge was opened in December 1999, and 21st century additions include Seán O'Casey Bridge (2005), Samuel Beckett Bridge (2009), and Rosie Hackett Bridge (2014).

There are records regarding several bridges in County Kildare. A bridge was built in Kilcullen in 1319. There are also a number of historic private and disused bridges over the Liffey. One such stone bridge, at Harristown Estate in County Kildare, was built for John LaTouche in 1788. This remains in private use and is near the disused Harristown viaduct (over the Liffey) which was on the Sallins Tullow rail line and was last used in 1959.

=== Present day ===
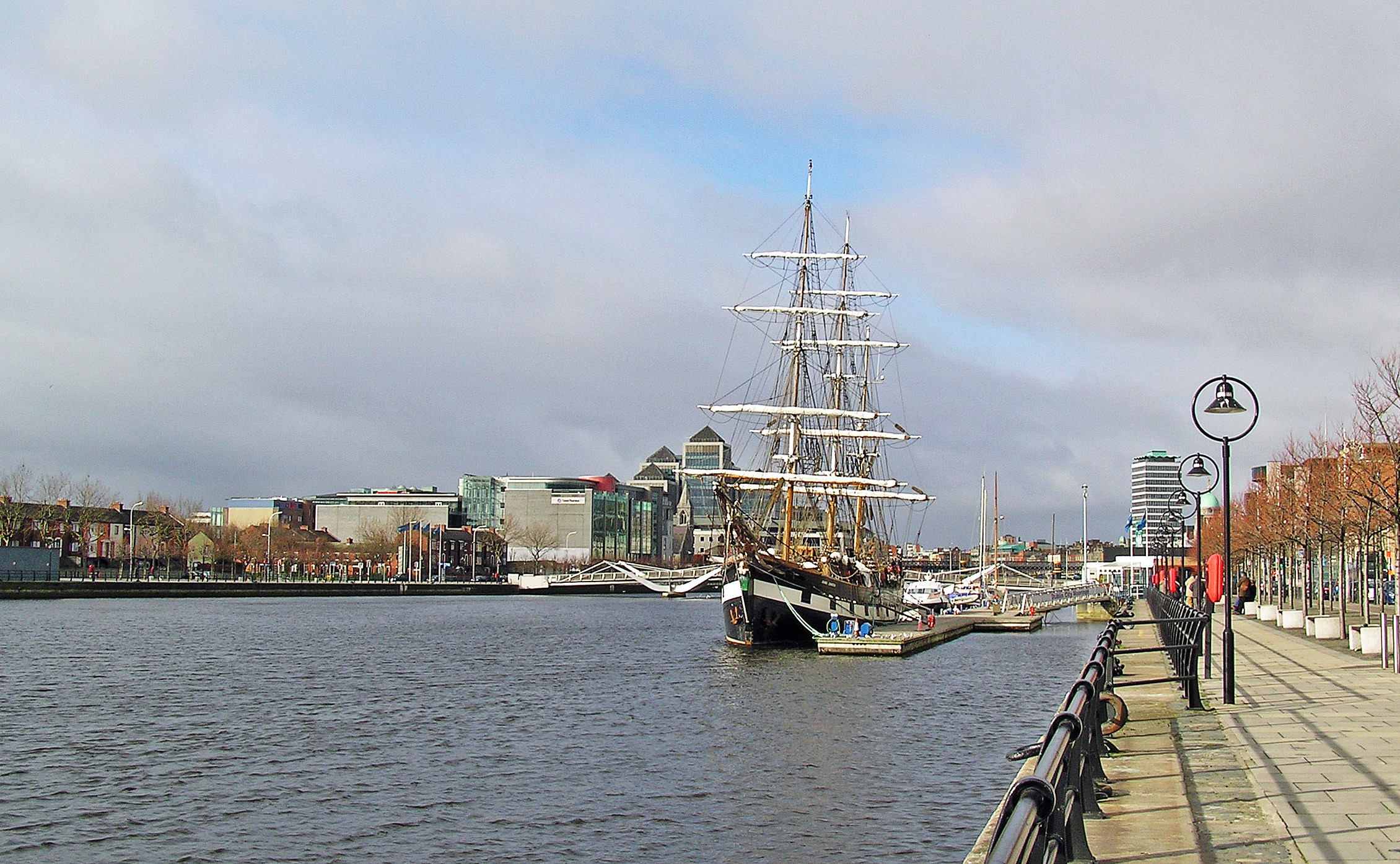
Ship Jeanie Johnston at River Liffey.

Dividing the Northside of Dublin from the Southside, the Liffey is today spanned by numerous bridges, mostly open to vehicular traffic. These include the West-Link Bridge on the M50 motorway, Seán Heuston Bridge and O'Connell Bridge. There are 3 pedestrian bridges in the city: the Millennium Bridge, Seán O'Casey Bridge and the Ha'penny Bridge. 21st century additions include the Samuel Beckett Bridge (2009) and James Joyce Bridge (2003), both designed by Santiago Calatrava.

Crossings further upriver include the Liffey Bridge at Celbridge, "The Bridge at 16" (a 19th-century pedestrian suspension bridge at what is now the K Club), and the Leinster Aqueduct – which carries the Grand Canal over the Liffey at Caragh.

Art works along the river and its quays include the Famine Memorial Statues (near the IFSC) and the World Hunger Stone.

== Quays ==
The song about Seamus Rafferty refers to the "bowsies on the quay"; However, from the late 20th-century there was some renewed development on the quays, with the addition of linear parks and overhanging boardwalks.

There are quays on the north and south banks of the Liffey, extending from the weir at Islandbridge to Ringsend bridge over the river Dodder, just before the East-Link toll bridge.

From west to east, the quays on the north bank are:

Bridgewater, Wolfe Tone, Sarsfield, Ellis, Arran, Inns, Ormond Upper, Ormond Lower, Bachelors Walk, Eden, Custom House, and North Wall.

From west to east, the quays on the south bank are:

Victoria, Usher's Island, Usher's, Merchants, Wood, Essex, Wellington, Crampton, Aston, Burgh, George's, City, Sir John Rogerson's, and Great Britain.

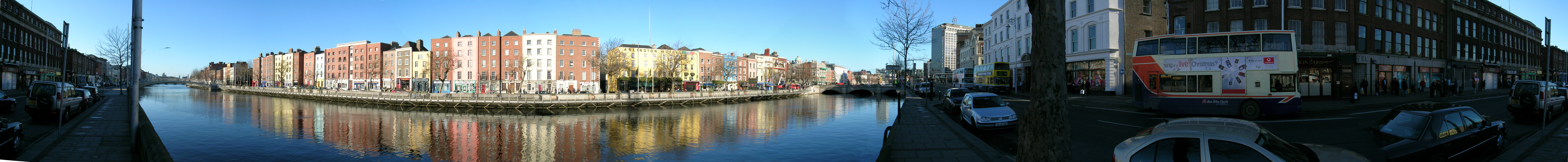
A panoramic view of Bachelors Walk taken from the opposite side, Aston Quay

== Annalistic references ==
In the Annals of Inisfallen for the year 808, an entry reads:

AI808.2 A defeat [inflicted] by the Laigin on Áed, son of Niall, at the river of Liphe.

== Popular culture references ==
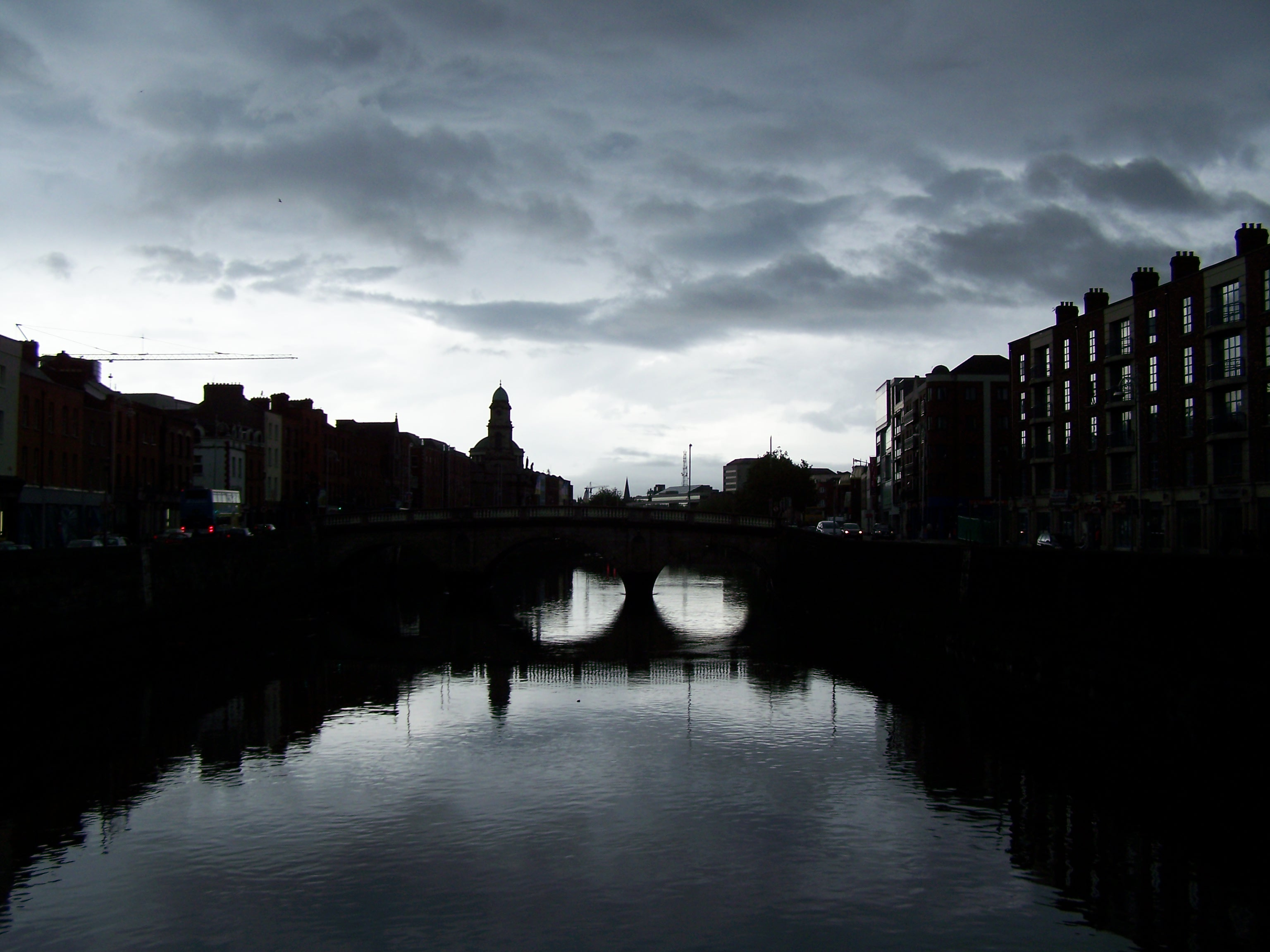
Liffey quays at dusk

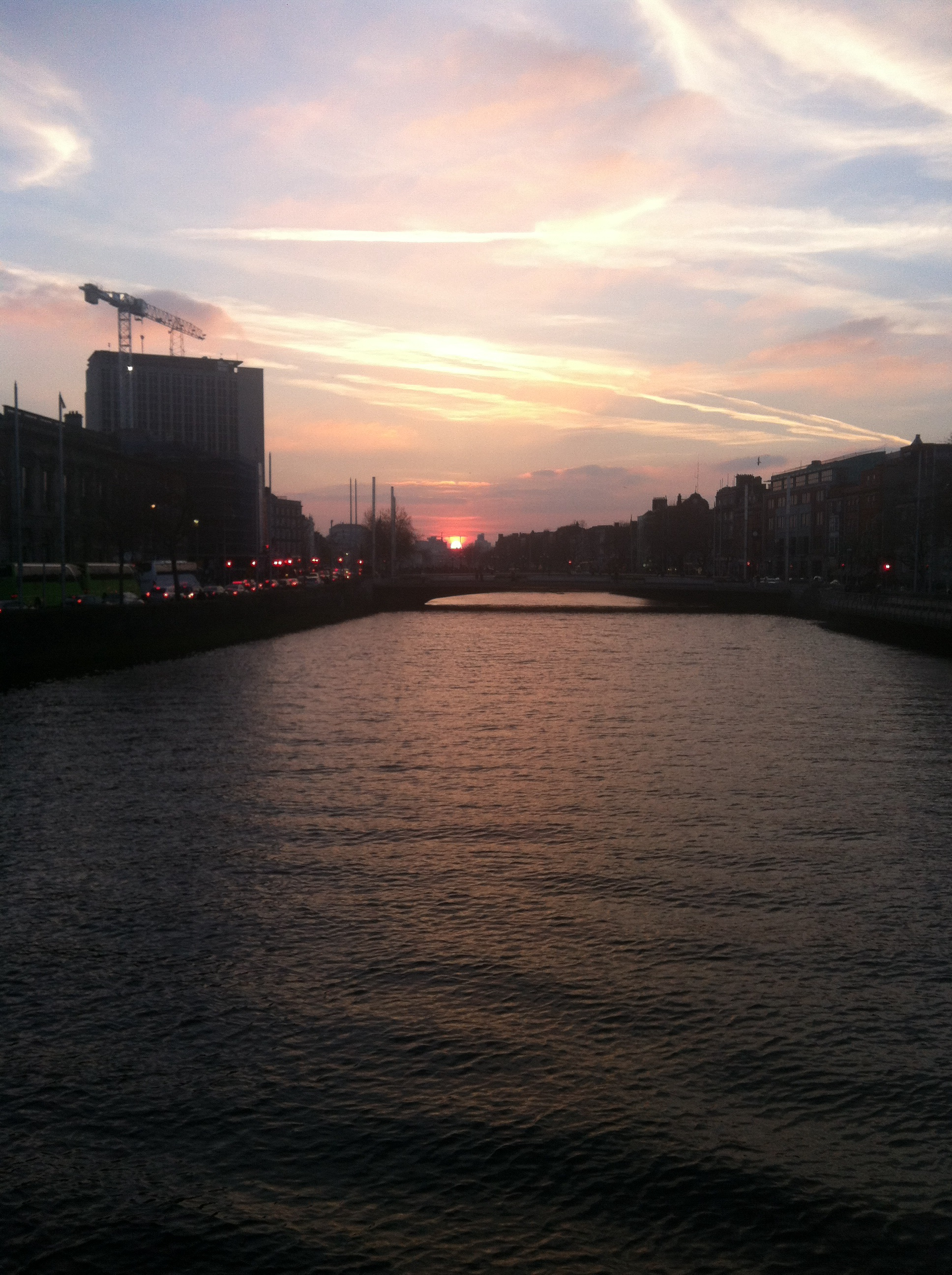
The River Liffey at sunset

From Joyce to Radiohead, the Liffey is often referenced in literature and song:

"riverrun, past Eve and Adam's, from swerve of shore to bend of bay, brings us by a commodius vicus of recirculation back to Howth Castle and Environs."

— James Joyce, Finnegans Wake (1939) (first sentence of novel).

That is the first of a number of references to the Liffey in the Wake: insofar as the book has characters, the female protagonist of the novel, Anna Livia Plurabelle, is herself an allegory of the river.

A skiff, a crumpled throwaway, Elijah is coming, rode lightly down the Liffey, under Loopline Bridge, shooting the rapids where water chafed around the bridgepiers, sailing eastward past hulls and anchorchains, between the Custom House old dock and George's quay.

— James Joyce, Ulysses (1922)

She asked that it be named for her. – The river took its name from the land. – the land took its name from the woman.

— Eavan Boland, "Anna Liffey" (1997)

That there, that's not me – I go where I please – I walk through walls, I float down the Liffey – I'm not here, this isn't happening

— Radiohead, "How to Disappear Completely" from album Kid A (2000)

O'h I've seen her face and I touched a dream, And made love down by the Liffey. Flow Liffey waters, flow gently to the sea. Flow Liffey waters flow, and sing and dance for me.

— The Wolfe Tones, "Flow Liffey Waters"

"Somebody once said that 'Joyce has made of this river the Ganges of the literary world,' but sometimes the smell of the Ganges of the literary world is not all that literary."

— Brendan Behan, Confessions of an Irish Rebel

"No man who has faced the Liffey can be appalled by the dirt of another river."

— Iris Murdoch, Under the Net (1954)

"But the Angelus Bell o'er the Liffey's swell rang out through the foggy dew."

— Canon Charles O'Neill, "The Foggy Dew"

"You can keep your Michael Flatley with his tattoos on his chest
Fare thee well, Sweet Anna Liffey, it's the Ganges I love best
I found a place in India so far across the foam
You can call me Punjab Paddy, boys, I'm never comin' home!"

— Gaelic Storm, "Punjab Paddy" from album How Are We Getting Home? (2004)

Fare thee well sweet Anna Liffey, I can no longer stay
I watch the new glass cages, that spring up along the quay
My mind's too full of memories, too old to hear new chimes
I'm part of what was Dublin in the rare ould times

— Pete St. John, "Rare Ould Times" (1970s)

Come here to me, I wish I was a may fly on the River Tay
I'd fit all my joys and my pleasures in one perfect day
I wish I was the sunlight just sitting on The Mississippi
I'd settle for a shopping trolley in The Liffey

— Hozier, "Anything But" (2023)

Oh low Liffey, show me gold
Like a heron, I will go
Oh roaring Liffey, when you're high
Like a cormorant I will dive

— Lisa O'Neill, "Rock the Machine" (2018)

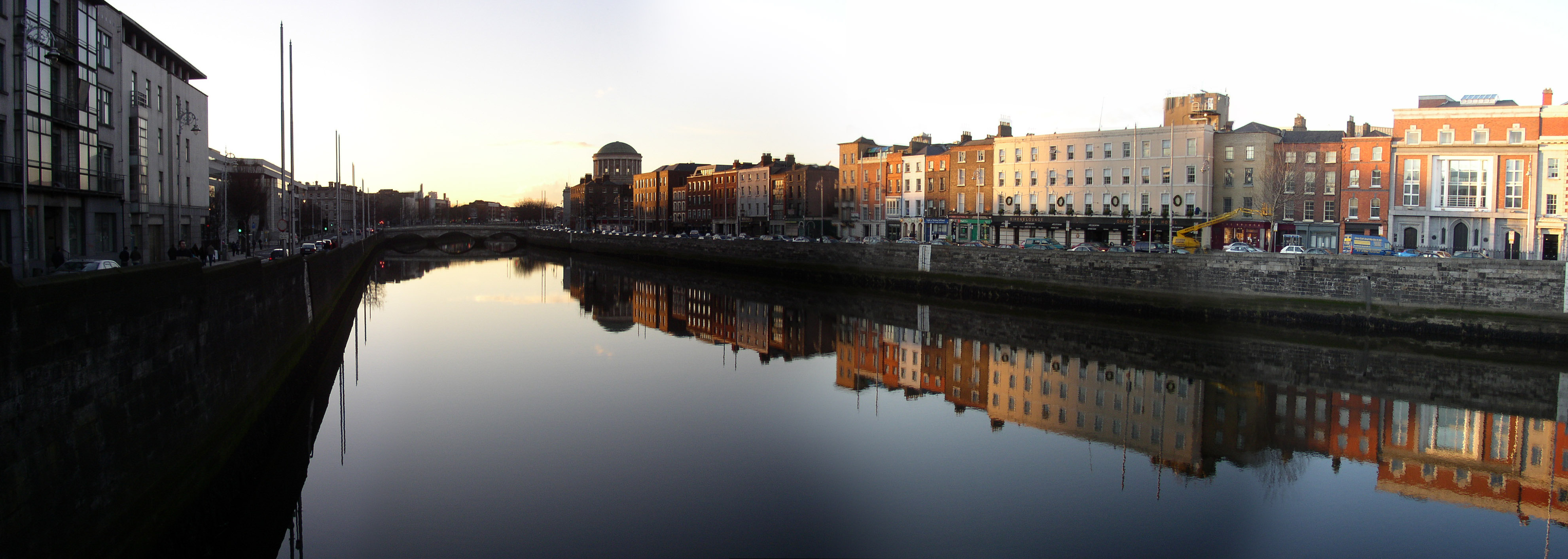
A view upstream from Grattan Bridge, towards the Four Courts (the domed building), with Essex Quay and Wood Quay on the right bank (left of picture) and Upper Ormond Quay on the left bank (right of picture).

== See also ==
- HMS Liffey
- List of rivers of Ireland
- Rivers of Ireland
