= Liberty Hall =

Building on Dublin's northside, formerly tallest structure in Dublin

- Halla na Saoirse
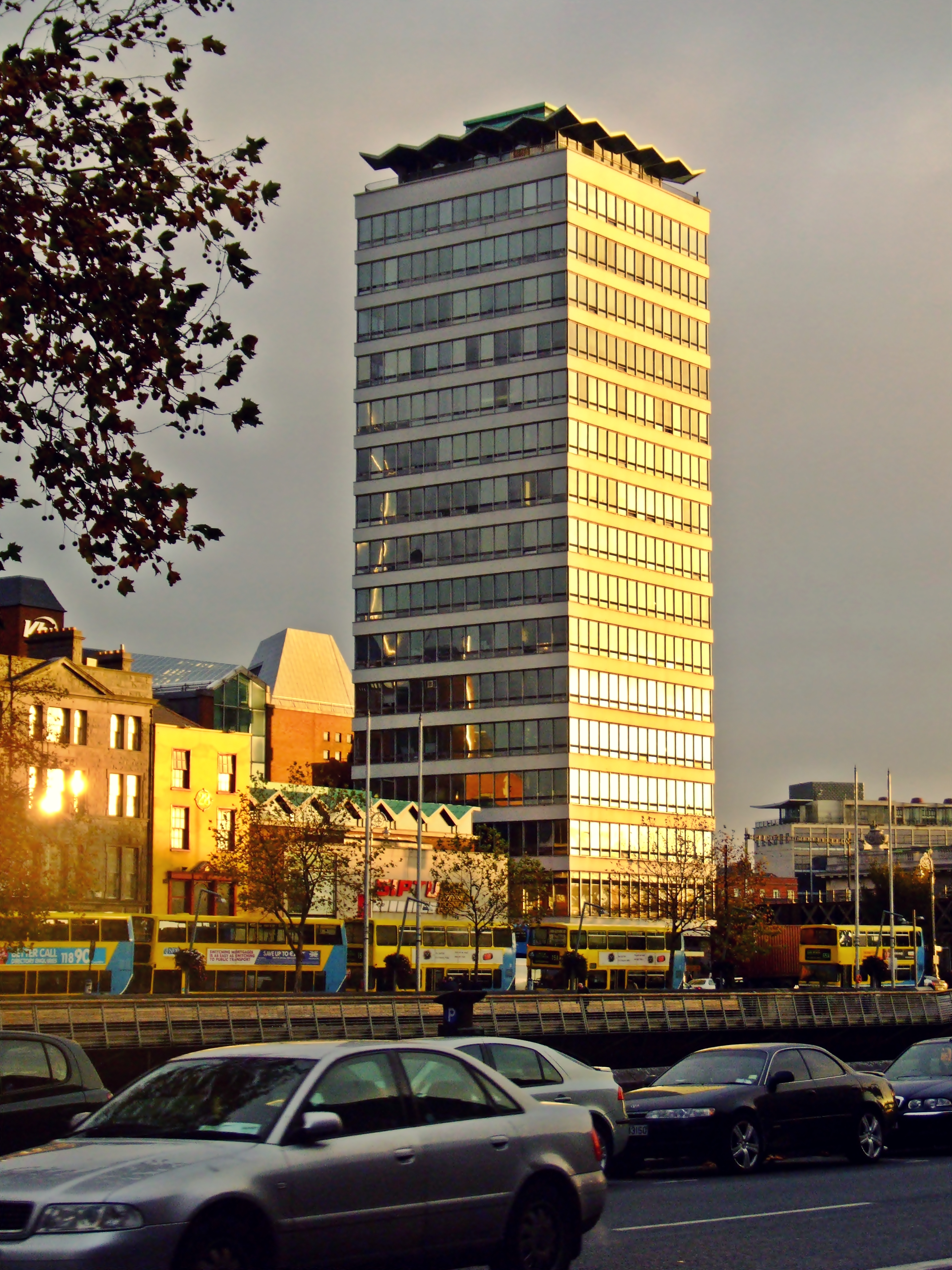
- Liberty Hall, the headquarters of SIPTU

- Location within Central Dublin

General information
- Status: Completed
- Architectural style: International Style
- Location: Eden Quay, Dublin, Ireland
- Coordinates: 53.3483°N 6.25527°W
- Construction started: 1961
- Completed: 1965
- Affiliation: The headquarters of the Services, Industrial, Professional and Technical Union

Height
- Tip: 59.4 m (195 ft)

Technical details
- Floor count: 16 excluding ground floor

Design and construction
- Architect: Desmond Rea O'Kelly
- Known for: Dublin's fifth tallest storeyed building and Ireland’s first tall building

Liberty Hall (Irish: Halla na Saoirse), in Dublin, Ireland, is the headquarters of the Services, Industrial, Professional, and Technical Union (SIPTU). Designed by Desmond Rea O'Kelly, it was completed in 1965. It was for a time the tallest building in the country, at 59.4 meters, (195 feet) high until it was superseded by the County Hall in Cork city, which was itself superseded by The Elysian in Cork. Liberty Hall is now the sixth tallest building in Dublin, after College Square, Capital Dock, the Exo Building, Montevetro (now Google Docks) and the Millennium Tower in Grand Canal Dock.

Liberty Hall is more historically significant in its earlier form, as the headquarters of the Irish Transport and General Workers Union early in the 20th century, and also as the headquarters of the Irish Citizen Army (ICA).

== History ==
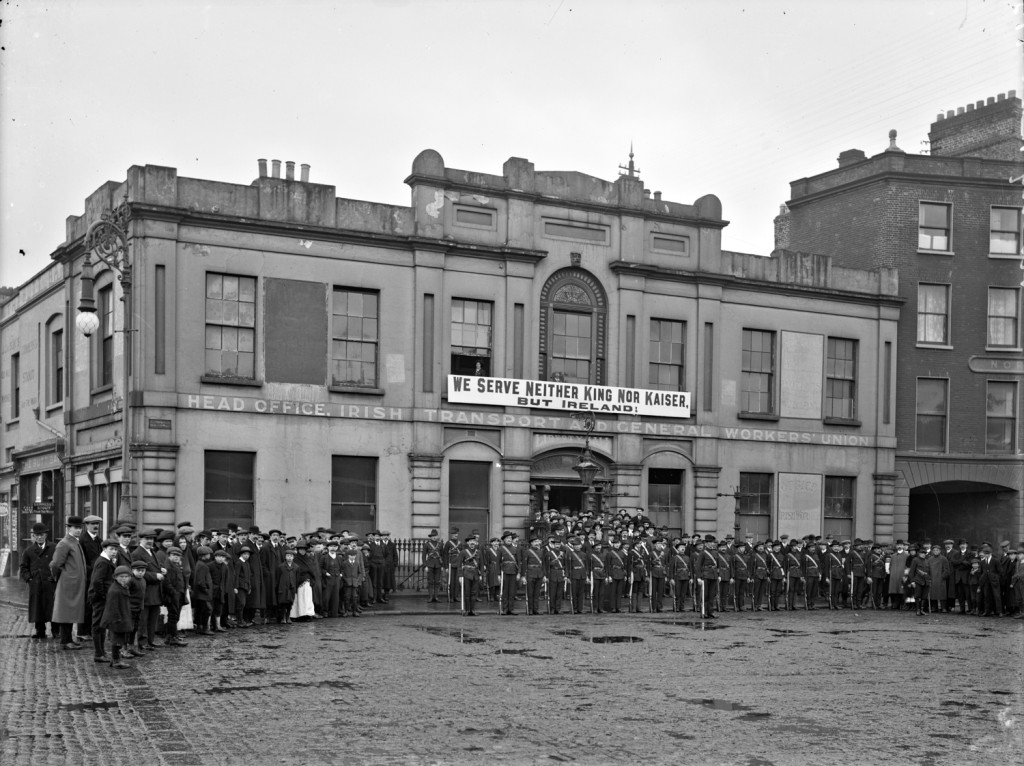
Members of the Irish Citizen Army outside the original Liberty Hall, beneath a banner that reads "We Serve Neither King nor Kaiser, But Ireland."

Standing on Beresford Place and Eden Quay, near the Custom House, the original Liberty Hall was built as the Northumberland Hotel before it became the headquarters of the Irish Citizen Army. During the 1913 Dublin Lock-out a soup kitchen for workers' families was run there by Maud Gonne and Constance Markievicz. Following the outbreak of the First World War a banner reading "We Serve Neither King nor Kaiser, But Ireland" was hung on its front wall, and ICA's newspaper, The Irish Worker, was printed inside. The newspaper was shut down by the Dublin Castle administration for sedition under the Defence of the Realm Act. It was replaced for a short time by a paper called The Worker until that too was banned. James Connolly edited a third paper, The Workers' Republic, from 1915 until the Easter Rising in 1916.

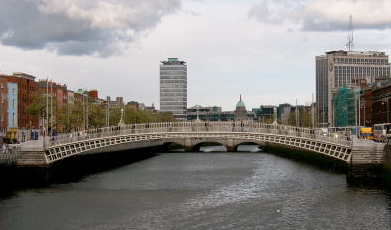
Liberty Hall, Dublin's fifth tallest storeyed building, stands in the background; in the foreground is the Ha'penny Bridge.

Until the Easter Rising, Liberty Hall also served as a munitions factory, where bombs and bayonets were made for the impending rebellion. It was on the street in front of the building that the leaders of the Rising assembled before their march to the General Post Office on Easter Monday. They left the building vacant throughout Easter Week save for Peter Ennis, the Building Manager/Caretaker, who remained there throughout Easter Week, apart from some forays to the GPO. This fact was unknown to the British authorities, who chose the building as the first to be shelled. It was seriously damaged by Royal Artillery units during the Rising, but was faithfully restored afterwards.

In the late 1950s Liberty Hall was declared unsafe and promptly demolished. The present building, which has sixteen stories, was constructed between 1961 and 1965. It was originally fitted with windows of non-reflective glass, but after they were damaged by a UVF car bomb on 1 December 1972 they were replaced with windows of reflective glass. The viewing platform, which had only recently been opened, was also closed after the car bomb.

In October 2006 it was announced that SIPTU (into which the Irish Transport and General Workers Union had merged in 1990) was seeking planning permission to demolish Liberty Hall and build a new headquarters on the same site. By October 2007 SIPTU had selected a shortlist of architects to design the new building and was planning to demolish the current building in 2009. In January 2008 the Dublin architects Gilroy MacMahon, who had designed the new stands at Croke Park, were chosen to design the new Liberty Hall. In February 2012 SIPTU was granted planning permission by Dublin City Council to demolish the present structure and build a 22-story replacement, with a height of about 100 meters. The new building would have included office space, a theatre and a "heritage centre". However, in November 2012 the planning permission was overturned by An Bord Pleanála, which ruled unanimously that the new building would be "unacceptably dominant in the city".

Liberty Hall was the subject of a documentary broadcast on RTÉ One in May 2009.
