= Dublin quays =

Quays along the River Liffey in Ireland

Coordinates: 53.3451°N 6.2741°W

The Dublin quays (Irish: Céanna Bhaile Átha Cliath) refers to the two roadways and quays that run along the north and south banks of the River Liffey in Dublin, Ireland. The stretches of the two continuous streets have several different names. However, all but two of the names (Bachelors Walk and Usher's Island) share the same "quay" designation. The quays have played an important part in Dublin's history. Within the city, the river has a width, between the quay walls, from about 30 m to over 300 m at its mouth where it enters Dublin Bay.

Much of the southern roadway and about half of the northern roadway is part of the R148 road, while the other half of the northern roadway is part of the R801 road.

== Routes description ==
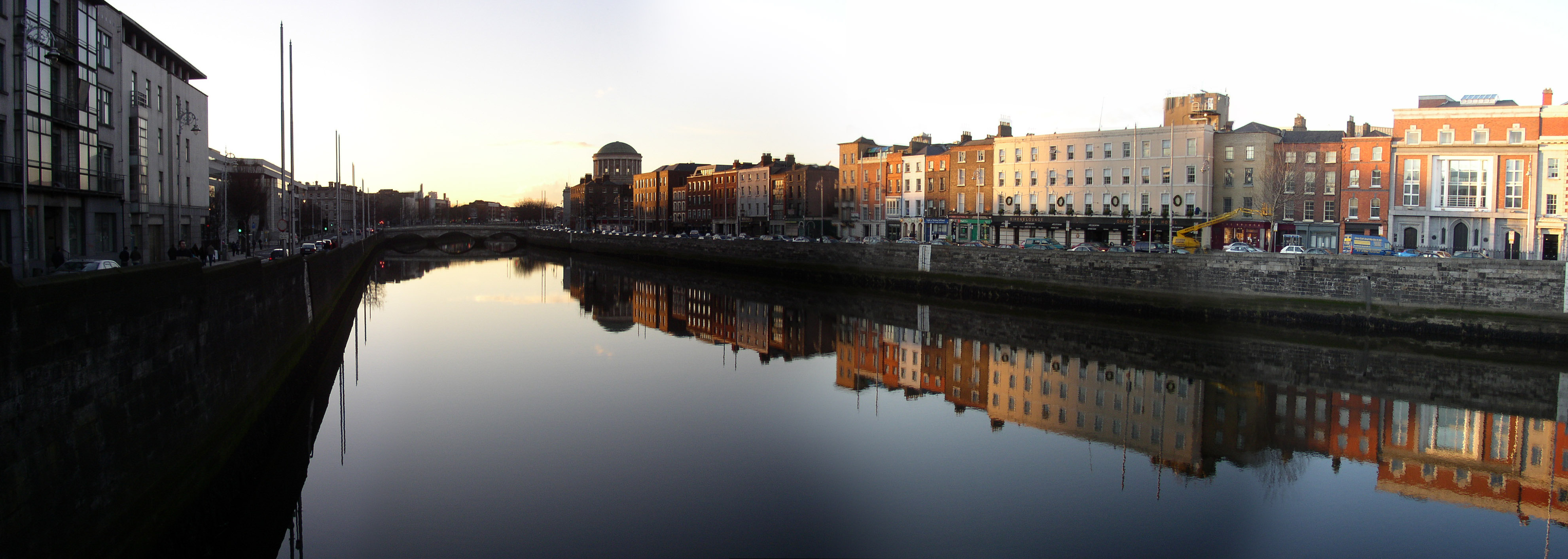
A view upstream from Grattan Bridge, towards the Four Courts (the domed building), with Essex Quay and Wood Quay on the right bank (left of picture) and Ormond Quay Upper on the left bank (right of picture)

Both roadways run approximately 4.3 km (2.7 mi) from Sean Heuston Bridge in the west. The eastern end of the north roadway is at East-Link Bridge while the south roadway turns southward at the Grand Canal. Seventeen bridges cross the river along the line of the quays; three of them for pedestrian use only, one a railway bridge, two on which Luas trams run, and the remainder for vehicular and pedestrian use.

The name designations of the north roadway are (from west to east): Wolfe Tone Quay, Sarsfield Quay, Ellis Quay, Arran Quay, Inns Quay, Ormond Quay Upper, Ormond Quay Lower, Bachelors Walk, Eden Quay, Custom House Quay and North Wall Quay.

The name designations of the south roadway are (from west to east): Victoria Quay, Usher's Island, Usher's Quay, Merchant's Quay, Wood Quay, Essex Quay, Wellington Quay, Crampton Quay, Aston Quay, Burgh Quay, George's Quay, City Quay, Sir John Rogerson's Quay and Britain Quay.

A majority of the roadways in the city centre are one-way with the north roadway being eastward and the south being westward.

Plan of quays in Dublin city (scroll to view)

== History ==
=== Vikings ===
The site of the original Dubh Linn (black pool) in modern times

Vikings were among the first settlers in Dublin and many Viking artefacts were found at what is now Wood Quay. The earliest known settlement along the navigable section of the River Liffey dates to the sixth or seventh century. The Vikings first arrived in AD 795 and established a permanent settlement by AD 841, known as Dubh Linn, meaning 'black pool'. Other settlements comprised small groups of dwellings scattered along both the northern and southern banks of the river on the modern-day northside and southside of the river.

=== Normans ===
The Normans arrived in Dublin in 1170, and during the thirteenth century, an extensive building programme transformed the settlement, resulting in the construction of Dublin Castle and numerous other stone buildings, including the conversion of the city walls to stone. The sections of the city walls adjoining the River Liffey remained incomplete, with gaps, allowing easy access to the quays. The quays were first developed during the time of King John in the early 13th century when the monarch licensed citizens to erect buildings on the River Liffey. According to Phillips and Hamilton, it was "probably from the beginning of the thirteenth century", and for the next five centuries, that the banks of the river underwent "development through reclamation and earthen or timber riverbank construction".

=== Development of quays and trade ===
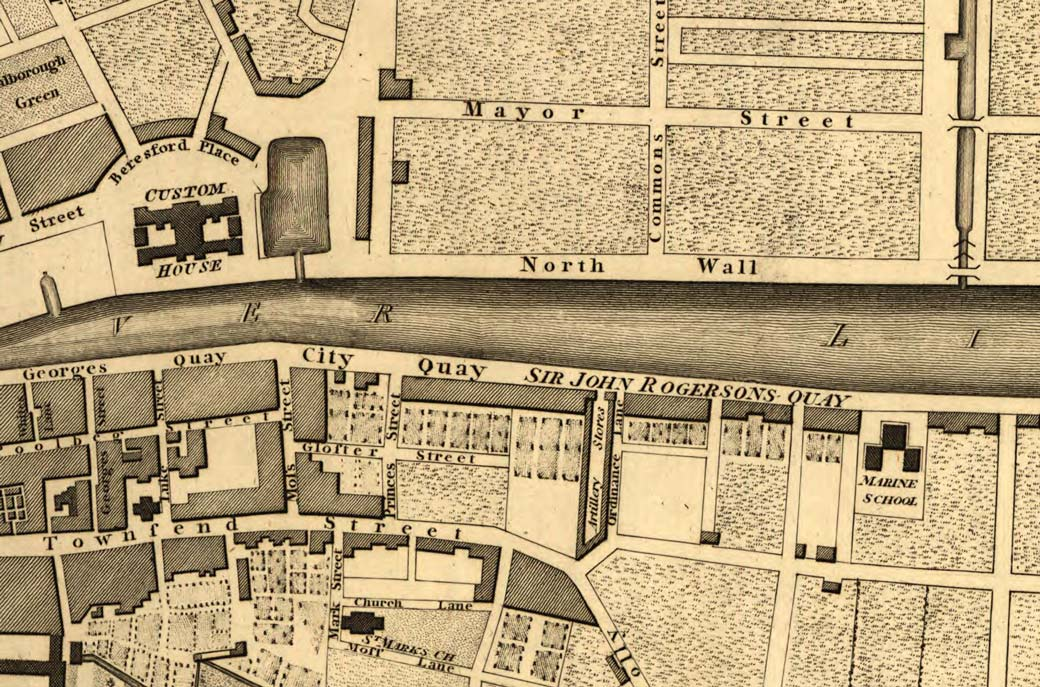
A map of Dublin Quays in 1797

In approximately the mid-thirteenth century, an early custom house, known as 'the Crane of Dublin', was established at Wood Quay within the safety of the city walls at Winetavern Street. On 11 March 1597, a substantial gunpowder explosion occurred at the location, demolishing as many as forty houses and leaving dozens of other buildings badly damaged. The explosion claimed the lives of 126 people and inflicted countless injuries.

The first of the broad quays on the north side of the Liffey, Ormond Quay, was laid out by Sir Humphrey Jervis in the 1680s, and named after the Lord Lieutenant James Butler, the First Duke of Ormond. According to The Irish Times:

Ormond persuaded Jervis to narrow the river by building a stone quay in front as a fashionable residential parade with associated commercial uses. His suggestion, which could hardly be ignored, was of immense importance to the future development of Dublin and inspired the city’s entire system of quays.

The Irish Times note that during its "17th century heyday" Ormond Quay would have been comparable to canal-side scenes we see in Amsterdam today, "with the river in front of the quayside crammed with small sailing vessels, barges and ferries, backed by a terrace of Dutch-style gabled houses". Parts of some of the houses from the original era survive, but they have been hidden from view by subsequent alterations.

The quays became the centre of the Irish shipping trade throughout the eighteenth century. A brick custom house (see: Old Custom House) was erected opposite Ormond Quay at Wellington Quay c.1707, which oversaw the import and export of goods to Dublin. By the 1770s, the suitability of the site was under serious reconsideration, with merchants complaining about the amount of shipping traffic on the river, the shallowness of the water, the inability of larger vessels to reach the location, and even the size of the building itself, which was too small to cope with the scale of trade.

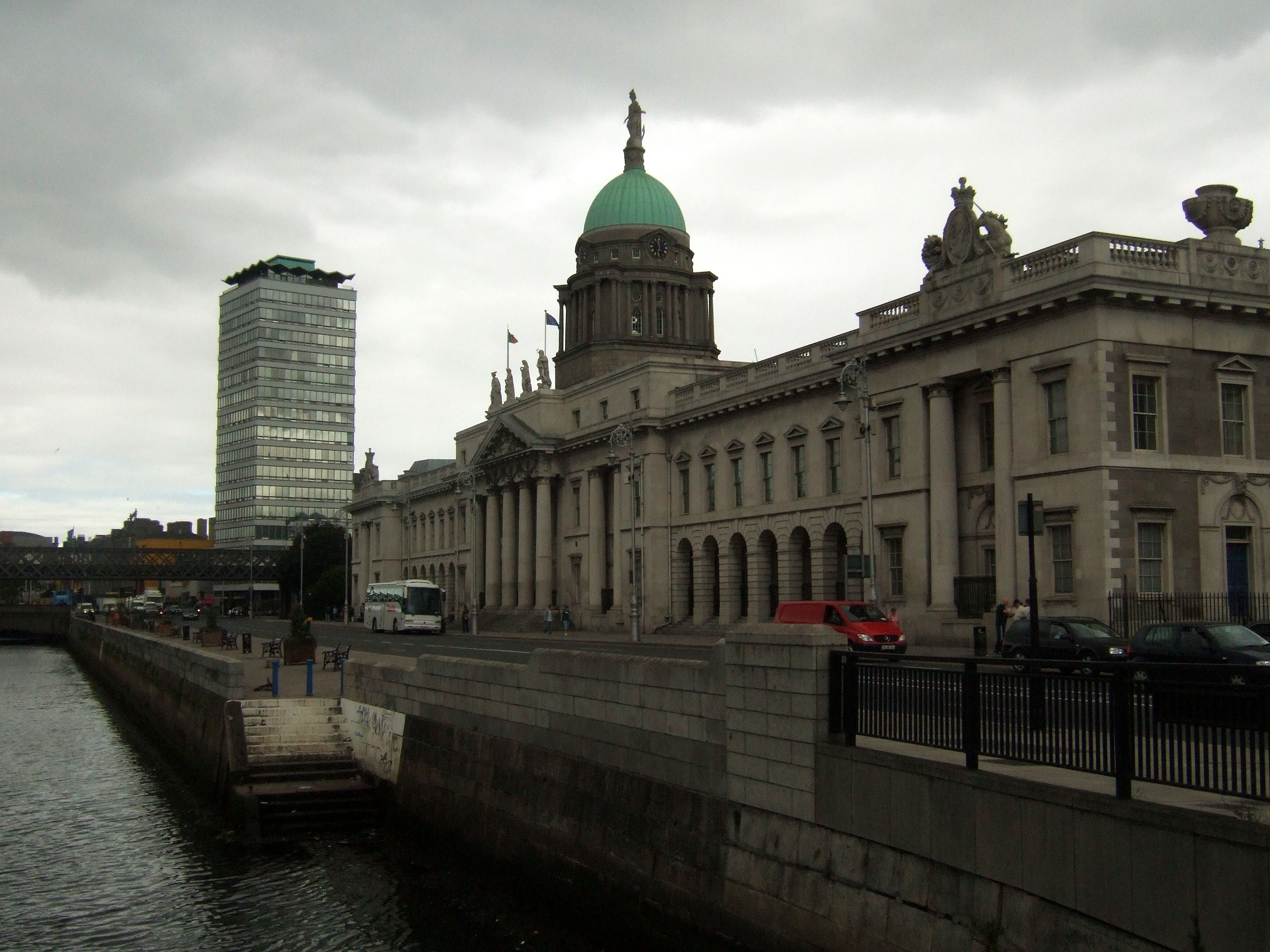
The southern façade of the Custom House on Custom House Quay

The building's main function was transferred to the significantly larger (newer) Custom House which opened in 1791. The building is sited further downriver nearer to the Irish Sea at Custom House Quay, which takes its name from the building, and remains one of Dublin's major landmarks.

With the focus of trade on the river moved downstream, Ormond Quay fell out of fashion at the end of the 18th century. With the construction of O'Connell Bridge in 1794, it limited tall-masted ships from travelling further upriver, and Ormond Quay's "grandeur was eclipsed" within a few decades. Later, the Four Courts on Inns Quay was completed in 1802 and is currently home to the Supreme Court of Ireland and the High Court. Both it and the Custom House were designed by noted architect James Gandon. According to Phillips and Hamilton:

During the period from the first quarter of the eighteenth century to the second quarter of the twentieth century, significant development work took place on training the river to accommodate shipping. In particular the second and third quarters of the nineteenth century were witness to significant development as quay walls on both the north side and south side were constructed to create deepwater berthing.

=== 19th century ===
The decline of the north quays was "gradual enough" during the 19th century, according to The Irish Times, and the Dublin Pictorial Guide & Directory of 1850 lists picture-framers, law stationers, dressmakers, gunsmiths, solicitors, auctioneers, accountants, booksellers and watch makers based at Ormond Quay that year.

Burgh Quay is named after Elizabeth Burgh, wife of Anthony Foster whose son was the Rt. Hon. John Foster, last speaker of the Irish House of Commons. Burgh Quay was once the site of the Tivoli Theatre. The Corn Exchange Building, designed by George Halpin in 1815, was approved by the Wide Streets Commission in 1816 and work commenced on this building soon afterwards. Its granite façade still remains on Burgh Quay. Shipping came as far upstream as Burgh Quay until 1879 when Butt Bridge was constructed. A number of the buildings on Burgh Quay (including number 8) still retain remnants of the shopfronts designed for the Wide Streets Commissioners.

=== 20th century ===
Looking east down Arran Quay towards Father Mathew Bridge at high water

The 20th century saw much development in the quays, however the physical decay of buildings accelerated during the century. Dereliction was common throughout the entire inner city during the 1970s and 1980s, and repeated threats were made from developers to demolish blocks of quayside buildings for redevelopment.

In 1845, McBirney, Collis & Company opened a store at 16 and 17 Aston Quay, and remained on the site as a department store as McBirney's until 1984. The building incorporated a set of three three-bay houses on the site, which was later remodelled in 1865. The building still retains the original store frontage of the department store. The building was later occupied by a Virgin Megastore from 1986, and is now a branch of the supermarket chain, SuperValu.

A controversial development was at Wood Quay by the Dublin Corporation in the late 1970s, when there were many archaeological Viking finds. This led to a very public, although unsuccessful, campaign to halt the development. In November 1974, The Architectural Review, a leading international journal, published a special edition on Dublin, in which it critiqued the scale of dereliction:

While picturesque decay may have its attractions as the subject for a painting, to allow structures to rot as they are doing along the Liffey quays is disastrous, for these riverside buildings are the essential Dublin. Individually unremarkable as works of architecture, collectively they are superb. If they are allowed to disintegrate, the most memorable aspect of the city will be lost.

Among the other quays that lost period buildings during the period was Arran Quay, when five Georgian houses were demolished illegally in January 1989 by Linders of Smithfield. By September 1983, an editorial in the Dublin Historical Record noted that:

It is obvious to anyone with even a casual interest that most of the properties on the north and south quays have, for various reasons, been permitted to deteriorate over the years, some to the point of dereliction. The result is that the entire stretch from O'Connell Bridge to Watling St. is now "ripe for development".

By 1988, architect and town planner Patrick Shaffrey described the quays thus: "The entire river frontage, an area of unique civic design, is rapidly becoming a continuous derelict site." He concluded that a "major, and immediate, objective should be to restore the Quays as a physical and aesthetic entity".

=== 21st century ===
The first phase of the Liffey Boardwalk opened in late 2000, a series of pedestrian walkways developed along the quays in the early 21st century.

On 21 February 2004, near the Clarence Hotel on Wellington Quay, a Dublin Bus lost control and mounted the pavement, crashing into a queue of 30 people boarding another bus to Maynooth. Five people were killed and 14 injured. The city's south quays were closed as rescue workers attended the scene. Driving conditions on the day were noted as being dry and clear and the driver was tried for dangerous driving causing death. His trial began in February 2007 at Dublin Circuit Court, but he was acquitted. It was found that the most likely cause of the accident had been a power surge in the engine. Volvo Bus Ltd, the manufacturers of Dublin Bus engines, said they were aware of "other cases of power surges in Ireland" in their engines.

In 2006, local politicians proposed renaming some of the quays that are named after UK monarchs. Member of the European Parliament Gay Mitchell proposed renaming George's Quay or Victoria Quay to Joyce Quay or Behan Quay, for the Irish writers James Joyce and Brendan Behan.

== Dublin quays in culture ==
A Picturesque and Descriptive View of the City of Dublin, a set of 25 architectural prints of well-known buildings and views in Dublin, illustrated in 1791 by the engraver, watercolourist, and draughtsman James Malton include a selection of scenes along the quays.

A number of artists have found inspiration from the quays. In 1898, author Frances A. Gerard described the Dublin quays as follows: "Much of the picturesque appearance of Dublin is due to the Quays which intersect the City and the Bridges which span the Liffey; they impart to it a foreign air resembling the Quays of Paris." Irish novelist James Joyce had many of his storylines take place at the Dublin quays, including "Eveline" (1904) and "An Encounter" (1914). Joyce biographer Michael H. Begnal wrote, "Joyce associated the Liffey Quays with the desire for escape."

Artist Jack Butler Yeats painted Dublin Quays in 1916.

The 1987 film The Dead, adapted from a story by Joyce, was filmed by John Huston at Usher's Island. In Joyce's story, "The Dead", the sisters Kate and Julia Morkan host their annual dance at their "dark gaunt house on Usher's Island". 'Ushers Island' was the name of a competitor in the 1994 Grand National at Aintree, falling at the third fence. In 2015, folk musician Andy Irvine launched a band called 'Usher's Island' (a reference to the Dublin quay), with members including Dónal Lunny, Paddy Glackin and Michael McGoldrick.

Bachelors Walk was a comedy-drama aired on RTÉ during March 2001, following the lives of three bachelors who lived on the titular quay.

Rudyard Kipling began his poem "Belts" with the lines:

"There was a row in Silver Street, that's near to Dublin Quay / Between an Irish regiment an' English cavalree."

== Notable buildings and locations along the quays ==
From west to east:

- Heuston railway station (near Victoria Quay)
- Collins Barracks (separated from Wolfe Tone Quay by Croppies' Acre Memorial Park)
- Guinness Brewery (Victoria Quay)
- "The Dead" House (Usher's Island)
- St. Paul's Church (Arran Quay)
- The Four Courts (Inns Quay)
- Church of the Immaculate Conception, a.k.a. "Adam and Eve's" (Merchant's Quay)
- Dublin City Council Civic Offices (Wood Quay)
- Smock Alley Theatre (Essex Quay)
- Ormond Quay Presbyterian church (Ormond Quay Upper) (1847–1940s)
- Sunlight Chambers (Essex Quay)
- Temple Bar (Essex Quay, Wellington Quay, Crampton Quay and Aston Quay)
- The Old Custom House (Wellington Quay) (1707 – c.1814)
- Clarence Hotel (Wellington Quay)
- The Italian Quarter (Ormond Quay Lower)
- Merchants' Hall (Wellington Quay)
- Corn Exchange (Burgh Quay)
- Tivoli Variety Theatre (Burgh Quay)
- Liberty Hall (Eden Quay)
- Custom House (Custom House Quay)
- City Arts Centre (1989–2001)
- International Financial Services Centre (Custom House Quay and North Wall Quay)
- CHQ Building (Custom House Quay)
- Famine Memorial (Custom House Quay)
- George's Dock (Custom House Quay)
- EPIC The Irish Emigration Museum (Custom House Quay)
- Jeanie Johnston, museum ship docked at (Custom House Quay)
- Spencer Dock (North Wall Quay)
- Convention Centre Dublin (North Wall Quay)
- North Wall railway station (1877–1922)
- Central Bank of Ireland (North Wall Quay)
- Royal Hibernian Marine School (Sir John Rogerson's Quay) (1773–1979)
- Dublin Landings (North Wall Quay)
- Liffey Service Tunnel (North Wall Quay)
- 3Arena, previously the Point Depot and the O_{2} (North Wall Quay)
- Point Village (North Wall Quay)
- Grand Canal Dock (Britain Quay)
- Silicon Docks (undefined area)
- Dublin Port (east of the quays, towards Dublin Bay)
- Poolbeg Chimneys (east of the quays, towards Dublin Bay)
- Poolbeg Lighthouse (east of the quays, towards Dublin Bay)

== Gallery ==
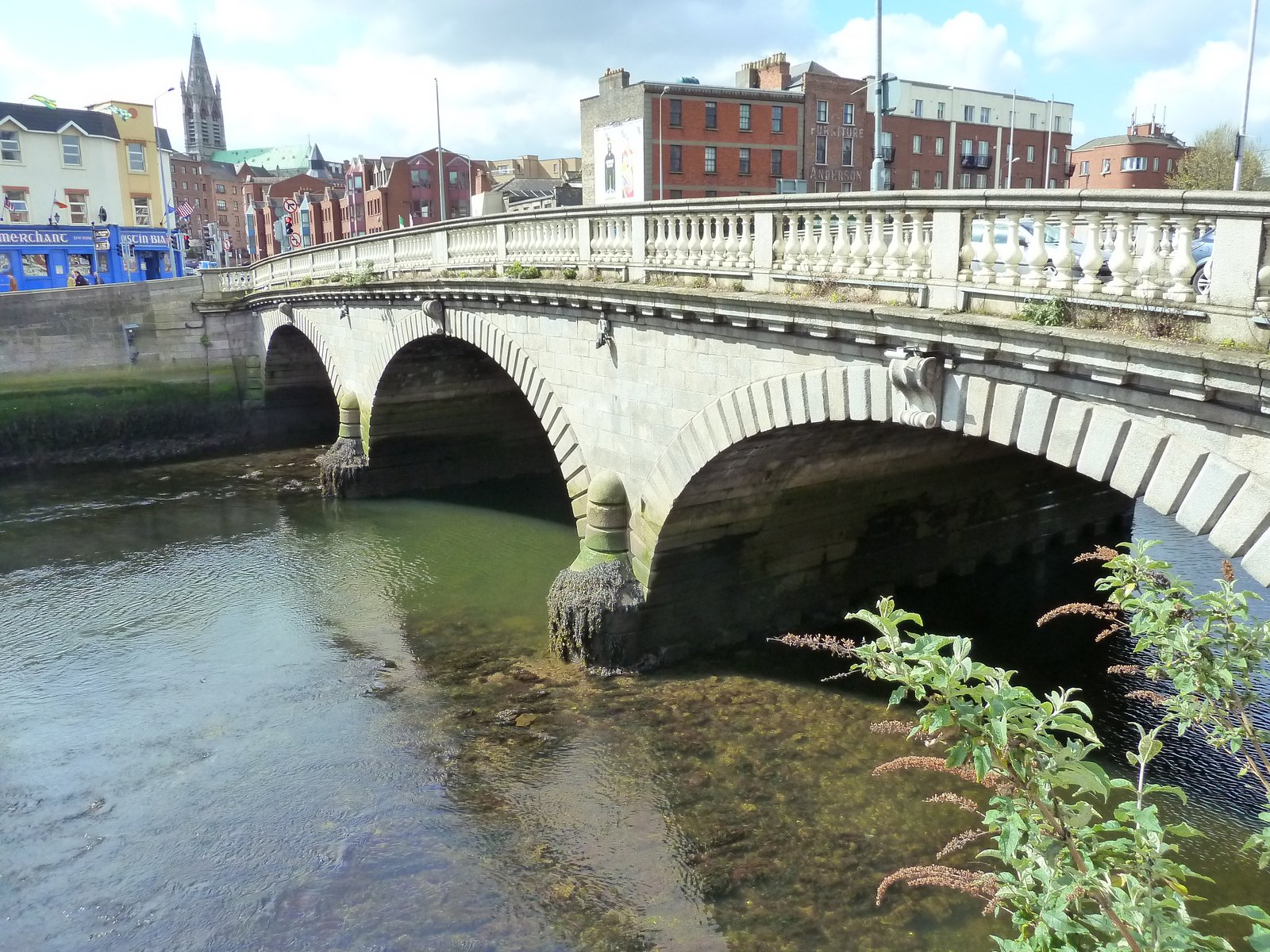
Inns Quay, 2012

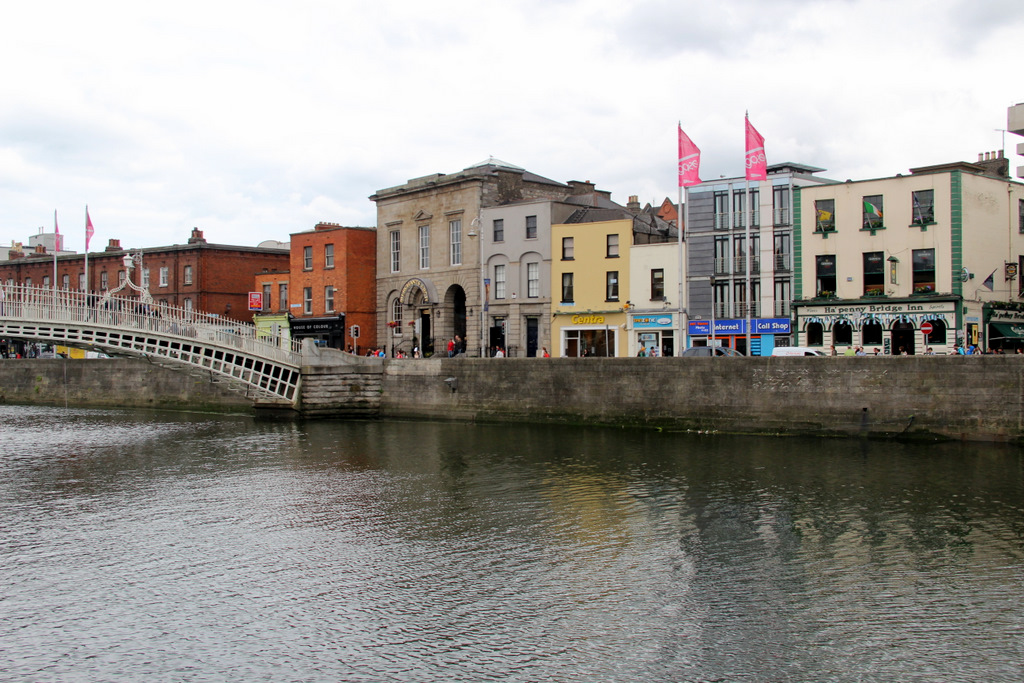
Wellington Quay, 2011

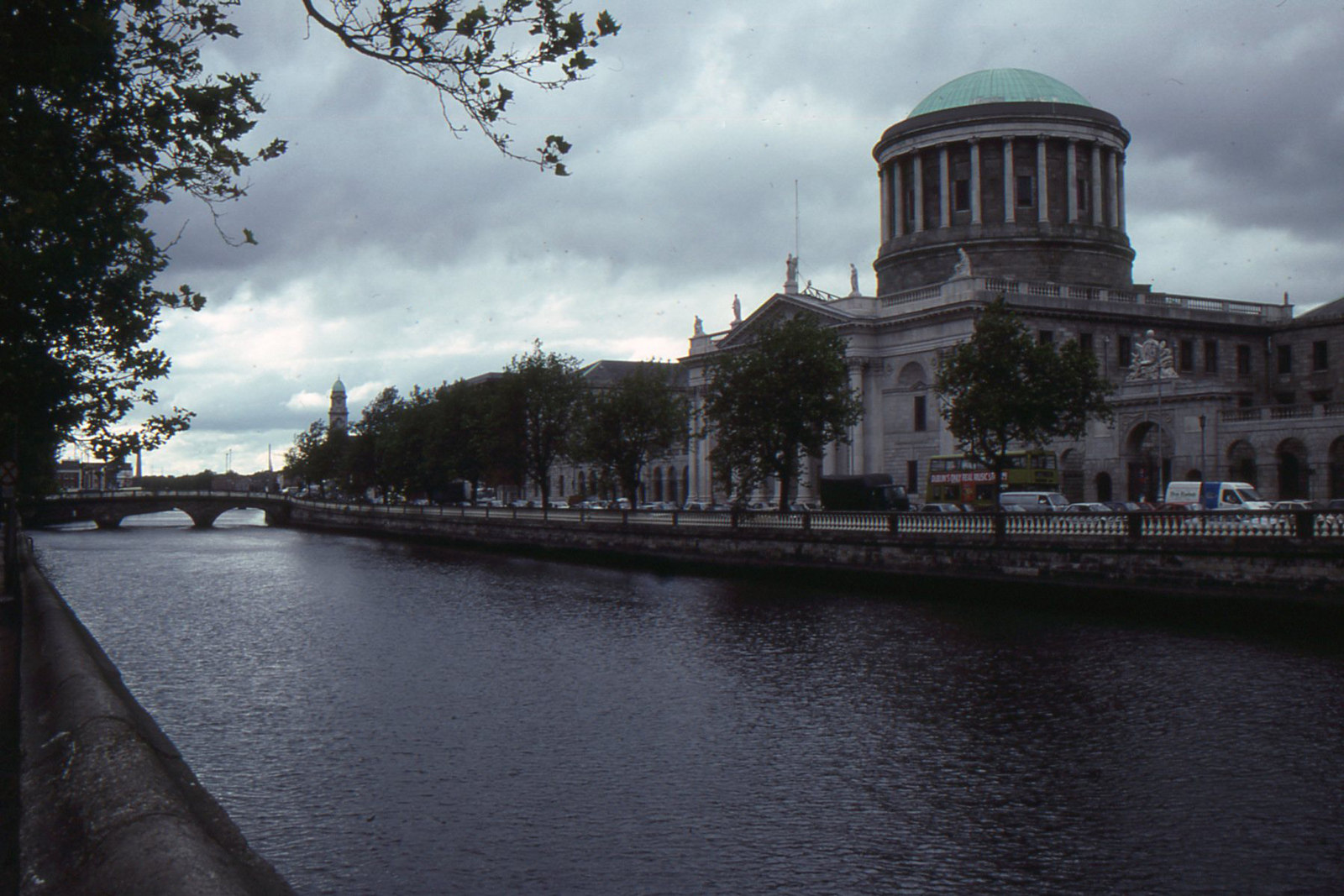
Merchant's Quay, 1993

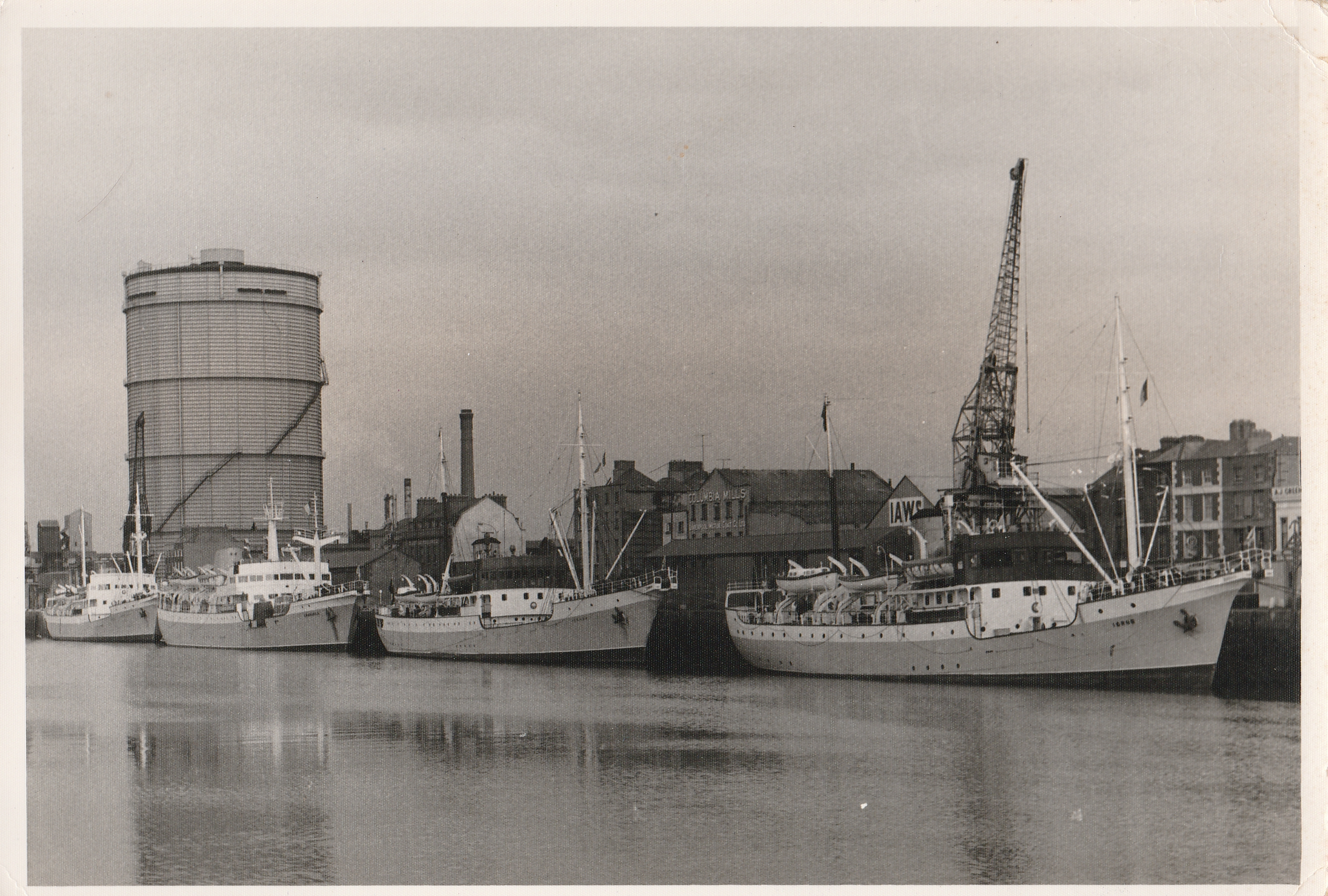
Commissioners of Irish Lights fleet moored against Sir John Rogerson's Quay, 1971 (Gasometer in background)

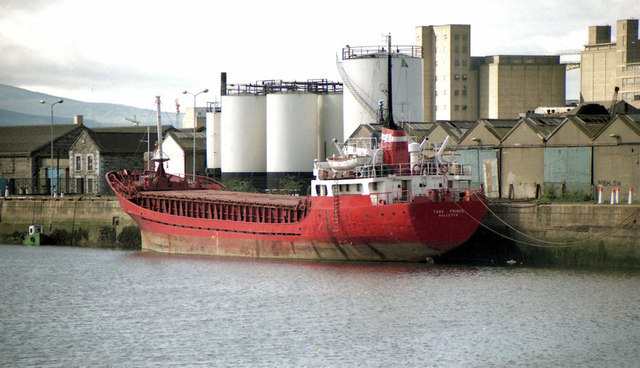
Britain Quay, 1990

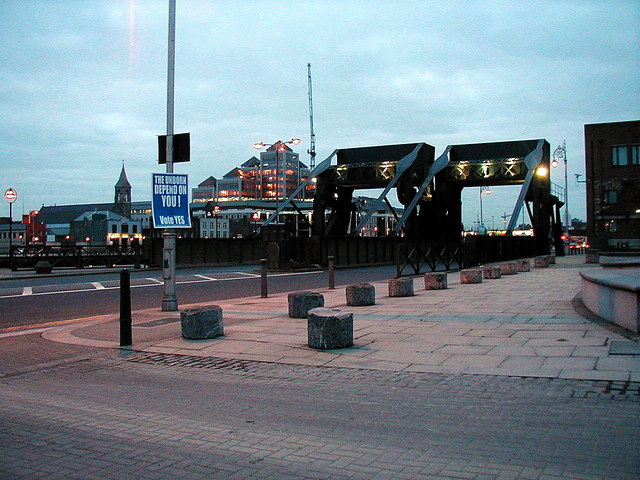
Lifting bridges at Custom House Quay, 2002

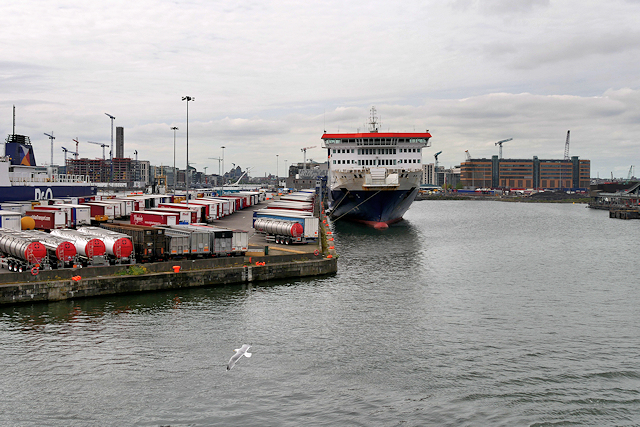
Container Terminal at North Wall Quay, 2017

== See also ==
- Clancy Quay, a residential development of houses and apartments situated upriver of the quays in Islandbridge, Dublin
- Northside, Dublin
- Southside, Dublin
- List of Dublin bridges and tunnels

== Sources ==
- Bennett, Douglas (2005) [First published 1991]. The Encyclopaedia of Dublin (Revised and Expanded). Gill & Macmillan. ISBN 0-7171-3684-1.
- Curtis, Maurice (2016). Temple Bar: A History. Dublin: The History Press. ISBN 978-1845888961.
- Fitzpatrick, Samuel A. Ossory (1907). Dublin. A Historical and Topographical Account of the City. Cork: Tower Books.
- Hopkins, Frank (2002). Rare Old Dublin. Heroes, Hawkers & Hoors. Douglas, Cork: Marino Books. ISBN 1-86023-154-3.
- Phillips, Michael; Hamilton, Albert (1 December 2003). "Project History of Dublin's River Liffey Bridges" (PDF). Proceedings of the Institution of Civil Engineers – Bridge Engineering. 156 (BE4). Institution of Civil Engineers: 161–179.
- Shaffrey, Patrick (1 June 1988). "Dublin: A Fading Princess?". Studies: An Irish Quarterly Review. 77 (306). Messenger Publications: 139–153. JSTOR 30091285.
- Simms, Dr. J. G. (1 December 1977). "Dublin in 1776". Dublin Historical Record. 31 (1). Dublin: Old Dublin Society: 2–13. JSTOR 30104025.
