= A Picturesque and Descriptive View of the City of Dublin =

Collection of pictorial prints of Dublin, Ireland (1791)

A Picturesque and Descriptive View of the City of Dublin is a set of 25 architectural prints of well-known buildings and views in Dublin, Ireland illustrated by the engraver, watercolourist, and draughtsman James Malton at the end of the 18th century. At the time of drawing in 1791, many of the buildings had been newly constructed and marked a high point of architecture, wealth, and political prominence of the city of Dublin. Malton's prints are arguably, the most important series of drawings of Dublin to the present day and almost all of the buildings illustrated still stand and maintain their position at the centre of Irish social, cultural, educational, political, commercial, and legal life.

The images were influenced by and even directly reproduced earlier perspectives and views of Dublin including those by Joseph Tudor in 1753 and Charles Brooking in 1728.

The drawings have been copied and reproduced hundreds of times and have become synonymous with the development and progression of the city.

== Listing ==
Order	Illustration by James Malton	Title of print	Status	Date of construction	Notes
1		Royal Exchange, Dublin	Intact	1779	Now usually referred to as City Hall.
2		Custom House, Dublin	Rebuilt	1791	Partially collapsed following a fire during the Easter Rising but was later partially reconstructed in Irish limestone rather than the original imported English Portland stone. The chimneys of the original design were not reinstated.
3		Charlemont House, Dublin	Intact	1763	Now houses the Hugh Lane Gallery.
4		College Library, Dublin	Intact	1732	The long room of Thomas Burgh's Old Library building.
5		Provost's House, Dublin	Intact	1759	Still functions as the residence of the Provost of the college. To the rear can be seen the street signs for Grafton Street and Suffolk Street while the old Campanile can be seen prior to its demolition and replacement in the 19th century.
6		Trinity College Dublin	Intact	1759	The West front of the college and some buildings facing College Green and Grafton Street can be seen to the right background.
7		Powerscourt House, Dublin	Intact	1774	The building now houses an upmarket shopping centre. To the right of the illustration can be seen City Assembly House which also still stands as of 2025 as the headquarters of the Irish Georgian Society.
8		Leinster House, Dublin	Intact	1748	Now houses the Irish Houses of Parliament, more commonly referred to as Dáil Éireann. It was for a period the headquarters of the Royal Dublin Society.
9		Great Court Yard, Dublin Castle	Intact	1720	The appearance is much the same as of 2025 with the notable exception being the tower of St. Werburgh's Church in the background however this was later demolished in the first half of the 19th century.
10		St Catherine's Church, Thomas Street, Dublin	Intact	1769	Still operating as a church building facing down Bridgefoot Street from Thomas Street.
11		Tholsel, Dublin	Demolished	1681	Located on Skinners Row and demolished in 1809 as the building was deemed to be structurally unsound. A direct replacement was never constructed and the Guilds of the City of Dublin were abolished soon after.
12		West front of St Patrick's Cathedral	Intact	1749	
13		Rotunda & New Rooms, Dublin	Intact	1791	Now referred to as the Gate Theatre.
14		Lying-In Hospital, Dublin	Intact	1767	Still operating as a maternity hospital.
15		View of the Law Courts looking up the Liffey, Dublin	Rebuilt	1786 - 1796	
16		View from Capel Street looking over Essex Bridge, Dublin	Rebuilt	1753	Rebuilt in 1872 as Grattan Bridge, the Capel Street buildings remain largely intact. The Old Custom House seen to the left was demolished in the early 19th century.
17		The Parliament House, Dublin	Intact	1729	Since 1803 used as the flagship Dublin branch of the Bank of Ireland.
18		Royal Infirmary, Phoenix Park, Dublin	Intact	1771	Now houses the Office of the Director of Public Prosecutions.
19		Marine School Dublin, looking up the Liffey	Demolished	1773	It was originally called the Hibernian Marine School and soon after gained a royal charter to become the Royal Hibernian Marine School. The school later amalgamated with other schools to ultimately form Mount Temple Comprehensive School. The remains of the building were demolished in 1979 after years in use as offices of a cold-storage company.
20		Royal Hospital Kilmainham	Intact	1687	Now houses the Irish Museum of Modern Art. The only building to appear in illustrations by Brooking, Tudor and Malton owing to its exceptional age.
21		St Stephen's Green, Dublin	Intact	1664	The green area was originally a common but was enclosed in 1663 with a permanent wall constructed in 1664 for the first time. In the background the park features a statue of King George II on horseback by John van Nost the younger, erected in 1758, until it was blown up in 1937 by Irish Republicans, the day after the coronation of George VI.
22		Blue-Coat Hospital, Dublin	Intact	1773	The Blue Coat School has been occupied by the Law Society of Ireland since the 1960s. The large tower at the front was never built and instead a dome was erected in its place in 1894. The originally planned quadrangle to the rear was also never constructed.
23		View of Dublin from the Magazine, Phoenix Park	Intact	1735	The magazine fort itself remains in a derelict state as of 2021 with plans for it to be refurbished as a tourist attraction. This was after an earlier view by Joseph Tudor in 1753 and was later also reproduced by Brocas.
24		Barracks, Dublin	Intact	1702	After an earlier illustration by Joseph Tudor in 1753 from the same location. Now operating as the National Museum of Ireland and usually referred to as Collins Barracks.
25		Saint Patrick's Cathedral, Dublin	Intact	1749	The cathedral spire was added in 1749 by George Semple.

== See also ==
- Samuel Frederick Brocas - illustrator of a series known as the Select views of Dublin.
- Charles Brooking's map of Dublin (1728)
- Joseph Tudor
- Flora Mitchell and Harry Kernoff
