= Joseph Tudor =

18th-century Irish painter

Joseph Tudor (1695–1759) was an Irish landscape artist active during the 18th century, working primarily in Dublin.

Tudor was influenced by earlier landscape artists such as Willem Van der Hagen. Among his most notable works are topographical prints and drawings of Irish buildings. These were influenced by the earlier Charles Brooking's map of Dublin (1728). He was highly regarded in his day and was awarded premiums by the Dublin Society every year from 1740 to 1746. His fame even garnered him a mention in Faulkner's Dublin Journal in 1745 and on later occasions.

== Personal life ==
He was likely the son of Thomas Tudor and was baptised at the Church of St. Nicholas Within, Dublin on 22 September 1695. He is recorded living on Dame Street opposite Fownes Court.

It is likely that Tudor had a daughter as Madden's premium of £5 to any boy or girl under 15 from the Dublin Society in 1746 was awarded to a Jenny Tudor for her drawings in black and white after Raphael and Titian.

An individual marked J. Tudor is also said to be depicted in a painting by John Trotter circa 1779 which includes the governors, founders and craftsmen of the Blue Coat School, Dublin.

== Six views of public buildings in Dublin (1753) ==
Order	Painting	Year	Title	Notes
1		1753	A prospect of the library of Trinity College, Dublin	A view of The Old Library, Trinity College Dublin. The building is one of the oldest extant buildings on the campus and was designed by surveyor Thomas Burgh.
2		1753	A prospect of the Upper Castle Court from the Council Chamber, Dublin	The view is much the same today, bar the missing tower and steeple of St. Werburgh's Church, Dublin, which was demolished in the years after, as it was viewed as a security threat to individuals in the castle.
3		1753	A prospect of the Custom House and Essex Bridge	A view of The Old Custom House, Dublin, which was demolished in the early 19th century as it was deemed unfit for purpose as a useful building.
4		1753	A prospect of the city of Dublin from the Magazine Hill in His Majesties Phoenix Park	A view of the city of Dublin from the Magazine Fort.
5		1753	A prospect of the Parliament House, in College Green, Dublin	A view from the west front of Trinity College Dublin showing the Parliament House, Dublin and Dame Street.
6		1753	Prospect of the Royal Barracks, Dublin, from St James's Church Yard	A view of what is now Collins Barracks, Dublin from across the River Liffey near St James' Church.

== Notable works ==
- Perspective view of the illuminations and fireworks at St. Stephen's Green on Thanksgiving Day, for the general peace concluded at Aix-la-Chapelle, 1748
- View of Leixlip salmon-leap and waterfall
- Altarpiece at Waterford Cathedral
- A view of the city of Dublin from Chapelizod
- A perspective of Sackville Street painted from an original plan by Oliver Grace
- Obelisk in memory of the Battle of the Boyne
- Various sets and backgrounds for the Smock Alley Theatre

== See also ==
- James Malton
- Jonas Blaymire
- A Picturesque and Descriptive View of the City of Dublin
- Charles Brooking's map of Dublin (1728)
