= City Hall, Dublin =

18th-century civic building in Dublin, Ireland

- Halla na Cathrach, Baile Átha Cliath
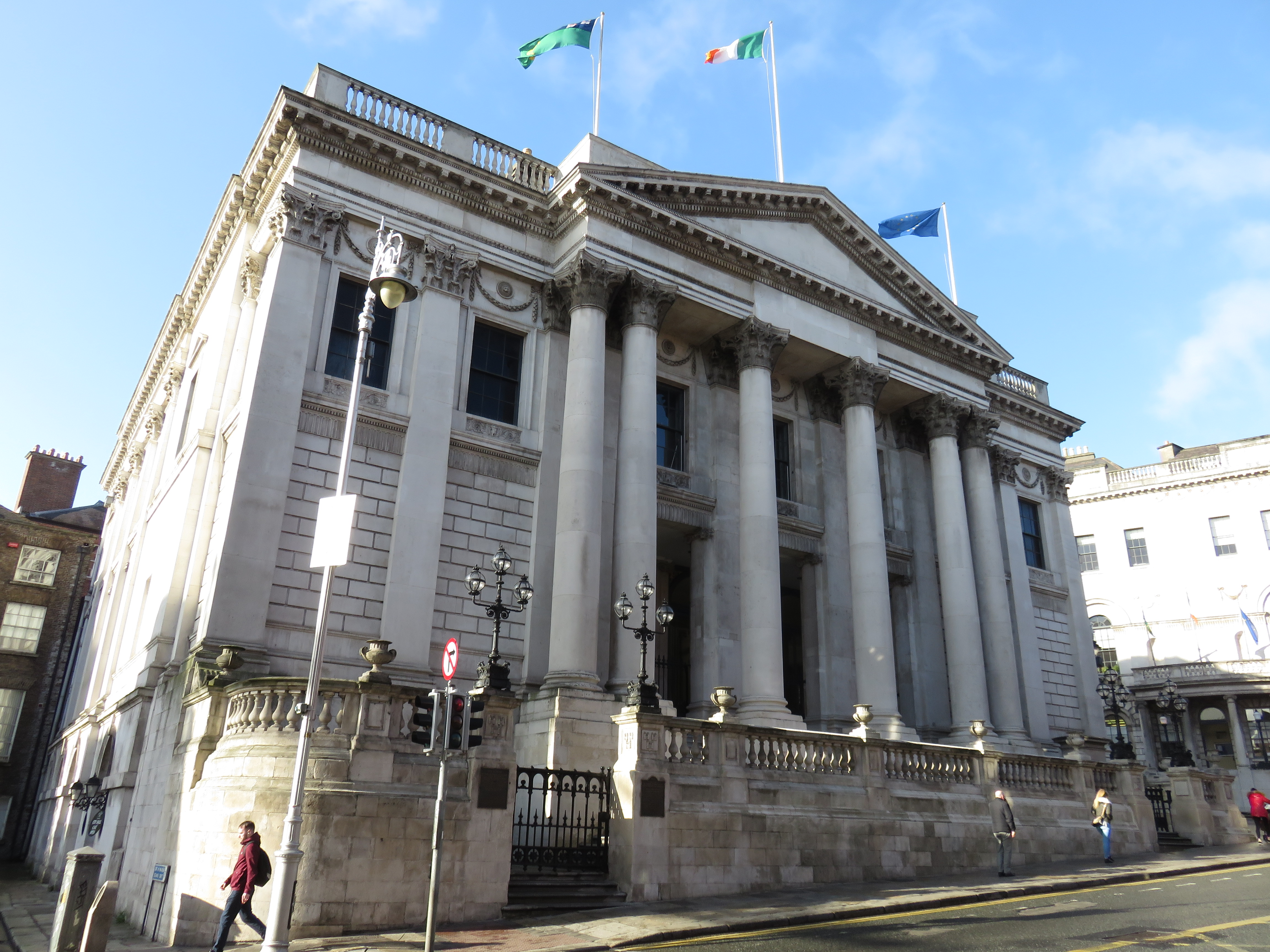
- Dublin City Hall from Cork Hill
- Interactive map of the City Hall, Dublin area
- Former names: The Royal Exchange

General information
- Location: Dame Street, Dublin 2, Dublin, Ireland
- Coordinates: 53.343854°N 6.267154°W
- Elevation: 8 metres (26 ft)
- Construction started: 1769
- Completed: 1779

Design and construction
- Architect: Thomas Cooley
- Other designers: Simon Vierpyl and John Morgan (stone carving)

The City Hall, Dublin (Irish: Halla na Cathrach, Baile Átha Cliath), originally the Royal Exchange, is a civic building in Dublin, Ireland. It was built between 1769 and 1779, to the designs of architect Thomas Cooley, and is a notable example of 18th-century architecture in the city. Originally used by the merchants of the city, it is today the formal seat of Dublin City Council.

== Location ==
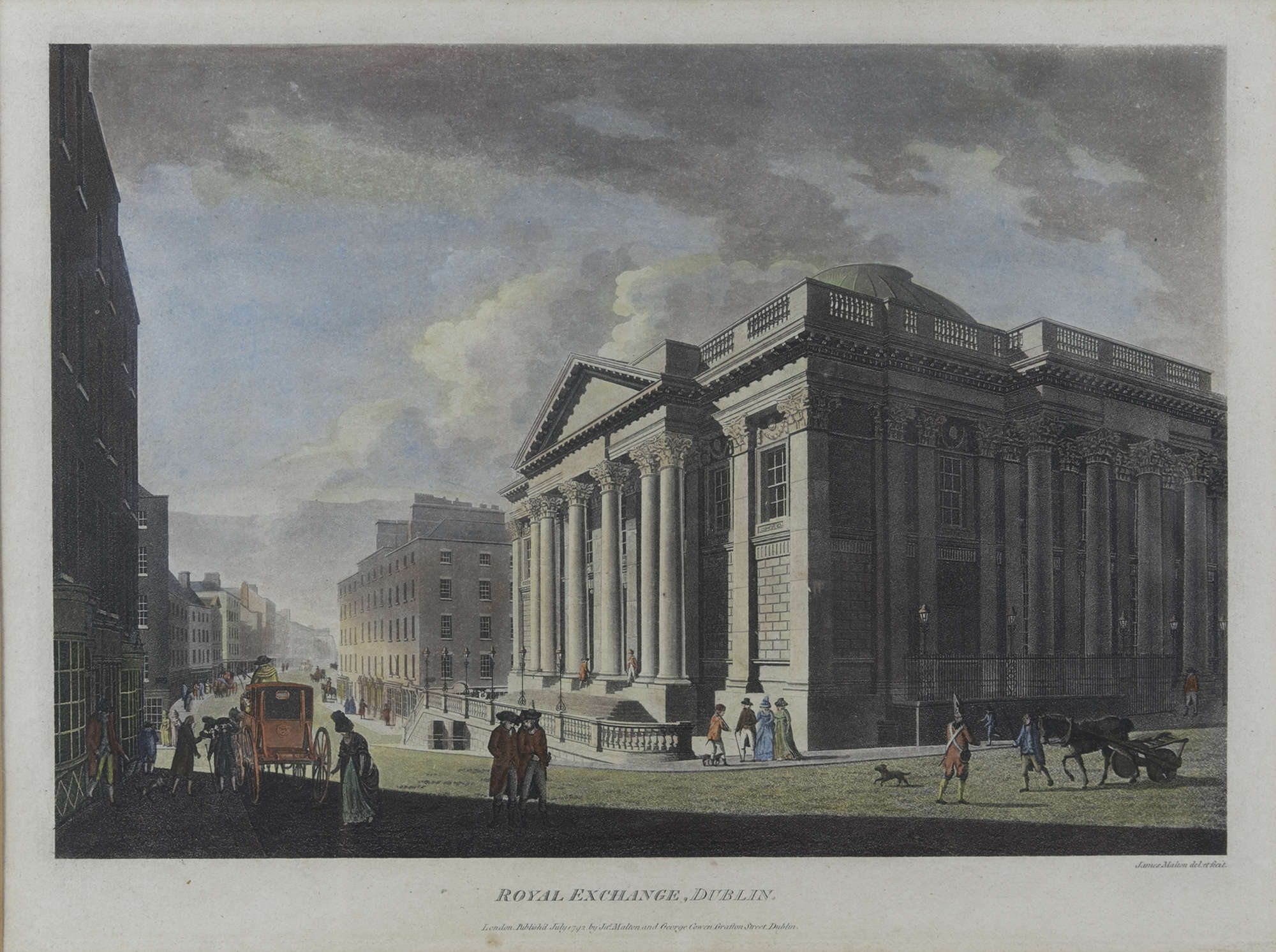
18th century view of the Royal Exchange; one of "Malton's views of Dublin"

City Hall is located on a slope on Dame Street, at the southern end of Parliament Street, on Dublin's southern side. It stands in front of part of Dublin Castle, the centre of British government in Ireland until 1922.

== History ==
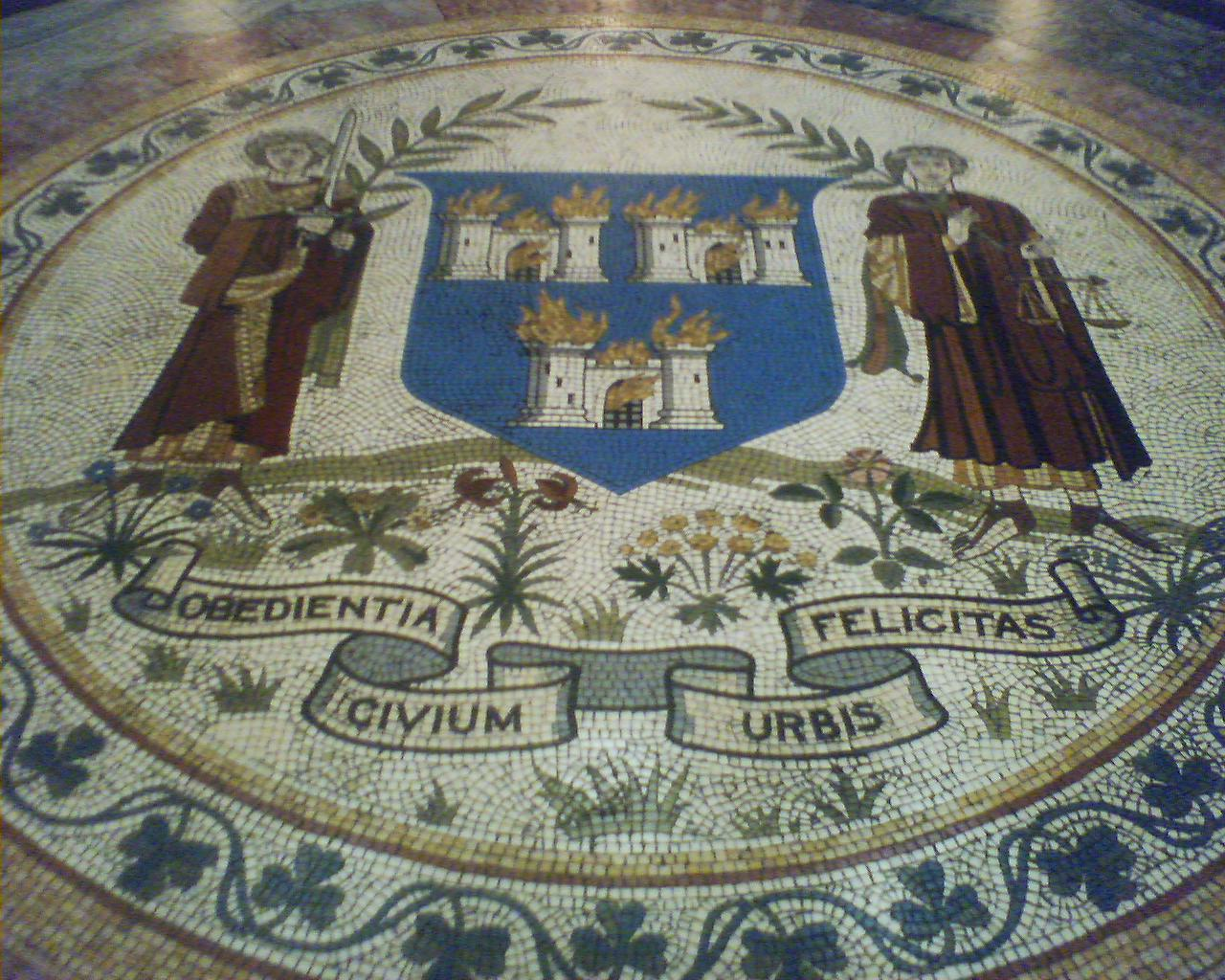
Floor mosaic showing city arms and motto

The building occupied the site of what was formerly Cork House, the home of Richard Boyle, 1st Earl of Cork until his death in 1643, as well as Lucas's Coffee-House. Prior to that point, the site was occupied by the church of St. Mary del Dam from which Dame Street gets its name.

Parliament Street had been laid-out in 1753, providing a continuation of Capel Street on the north bank of the Liffey, across the newly widened Essex Bridge. Originally built as the Royal Exchange, the structure was designed by Thomas Cooley, who had won a design competition run for the project between 1768 and 1769. The foundation stone was laid by the Lord Lieutenant of Ireland, George Townshend, 4th Viscount Townshend on 2 August 1769 and was officially opened for business in 1779.

The function of the building was to act as a form of stock exchange and to provide a meeting place for Dublin's businessmen. It was also close to the old Custom House making it convenient for overseas merchants. The cost of building the exchange was met by the Parliament of Ireland, and this is reflected by the initials "SPQH", standing for "Senatus PopulusQue Hibernicus", meaning "The senate and people of Ireland" (an Irish version of SPQR).

The city government had previously been located in the mediæval Tholsel at the corner of Nicholas Street and Christchurch Place, approximately 300 metres to the west where the Peace Park is now located as well in various other forms and locations including the Thingmount near present-day Suffolk Street. In the late 18th century, meetings were held at what is now City Assembly House on South William Street.

In 1815 the metal balustrade of the exchange fell, owing to the pressure against it by a crowd, which led to the death of nine people, with many more injured. This led to crowd restrictions in the building.

In the 1850s, Dublin Corporation bought the Royal Exchange and converted it for use by the city government. The changes included the construction of partitions around the ambulatory, the addition of a new staircase from the rotunda to the upper floors, and the sub-division of the vaults for storage. On 30 September 1852, the Royal Exchange was renamed City Hall at the first meeting of Dublin City Council held there. The ward name "Royal Exchange" was retained, corresponding to the current electoral divisions of Royal Exchange A and B. A series of frescos were later added, representing the regions of Ireland.

During the 1916 Easter Rising, the City Hall was used as a garrison for the Irish Citizen Army. Sean Connolly seized the building using a key which he obtained as he worked in the motor department and had access to the building. There were 35 people based here, mostly women. It was in this area where the first casualty of the rising, a guard named James O’Brien, occurred at Dublin Castle and he was shot by Sean Connolly while on duty. In total, the entire siege lasted about 12 hours.

== Structure ==
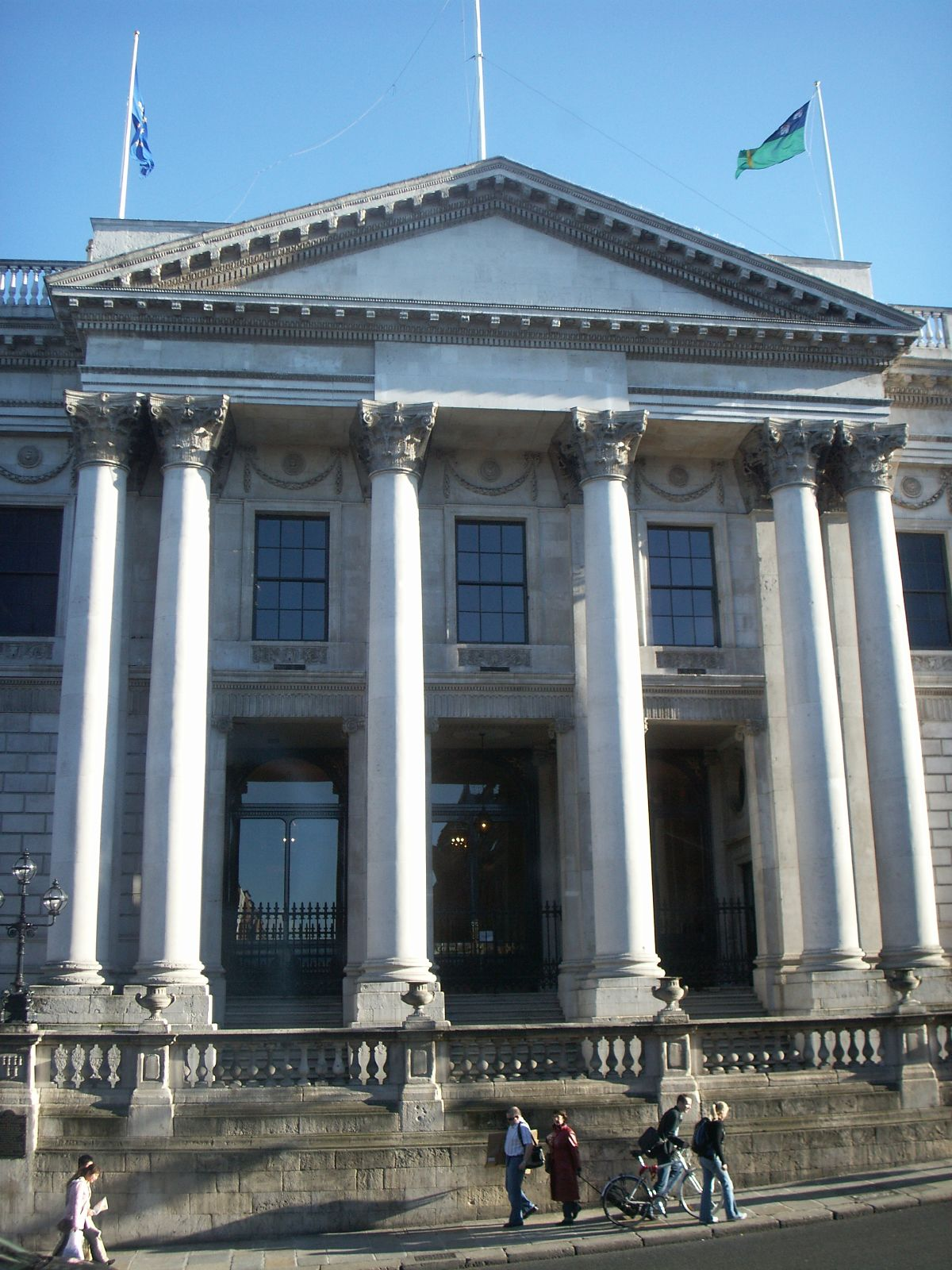
Main entrance to Dublin City Hall

The exterior of the building is primarily made out of white Portland stone from a quarry in Dorset. The carved capitals were by Simon Vierpyl, and plasterwork by the stuccodore Charles Thorpe. The neo-classical building contains a central entrance hall or Rotunda, with a large dome supported by twelve columns which are surrounded by an ambulatory where merchants strolled and discussed business meetings. The twelve columns supporting the dome are 32 feet (9.8 m) high and the dome itself is another 10 feet (3.0 m) high above that.

Patrick Wyse Jackson, curator of the Geological Museum in Trinity College, assessed the building in 1993 as part of his book "The Building Stones of Dublin: A Walking Guide" and made the following observation:

"...it is faced with Portland Stone and capped with a fine pattinated-copper green dome. Examination of the stone facing the River Liffey shows that it has deteriorated badly. It is blistered in places and supports a good population of algae and mosses. These plants tend to retain water, which accelerates the breakdown of the Portland Stone".

== Use ==
Some council meetings take place in City Hall. Dublin Corporation itself was renamed in the early 21st century as Dublin City Council, previously the name of the assembly of councillors only. Most City Council staff work in the newer, brutalist style, Civic Offices, controversially built from 1979 on the site of a national monument, the Viking city foundations on Wood Quay, a short distance away.

There is an exhibition on the history of Dublin City, called "Dublin City Hall, The Story of the Capital", located in the vaults of the building.

== Gallery ==
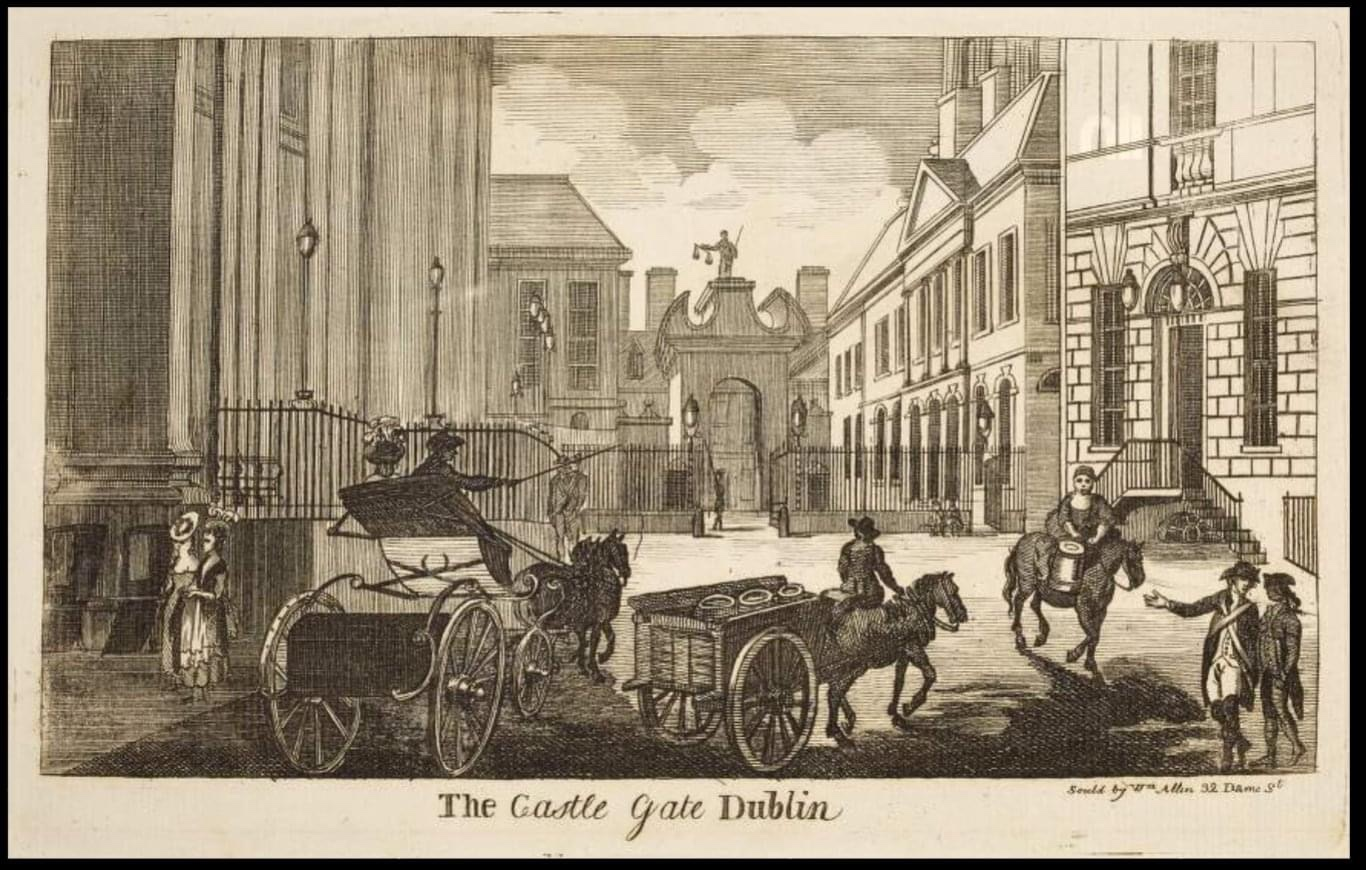
The gate to Dublin Castle which abuts City Hall c.1786-1820

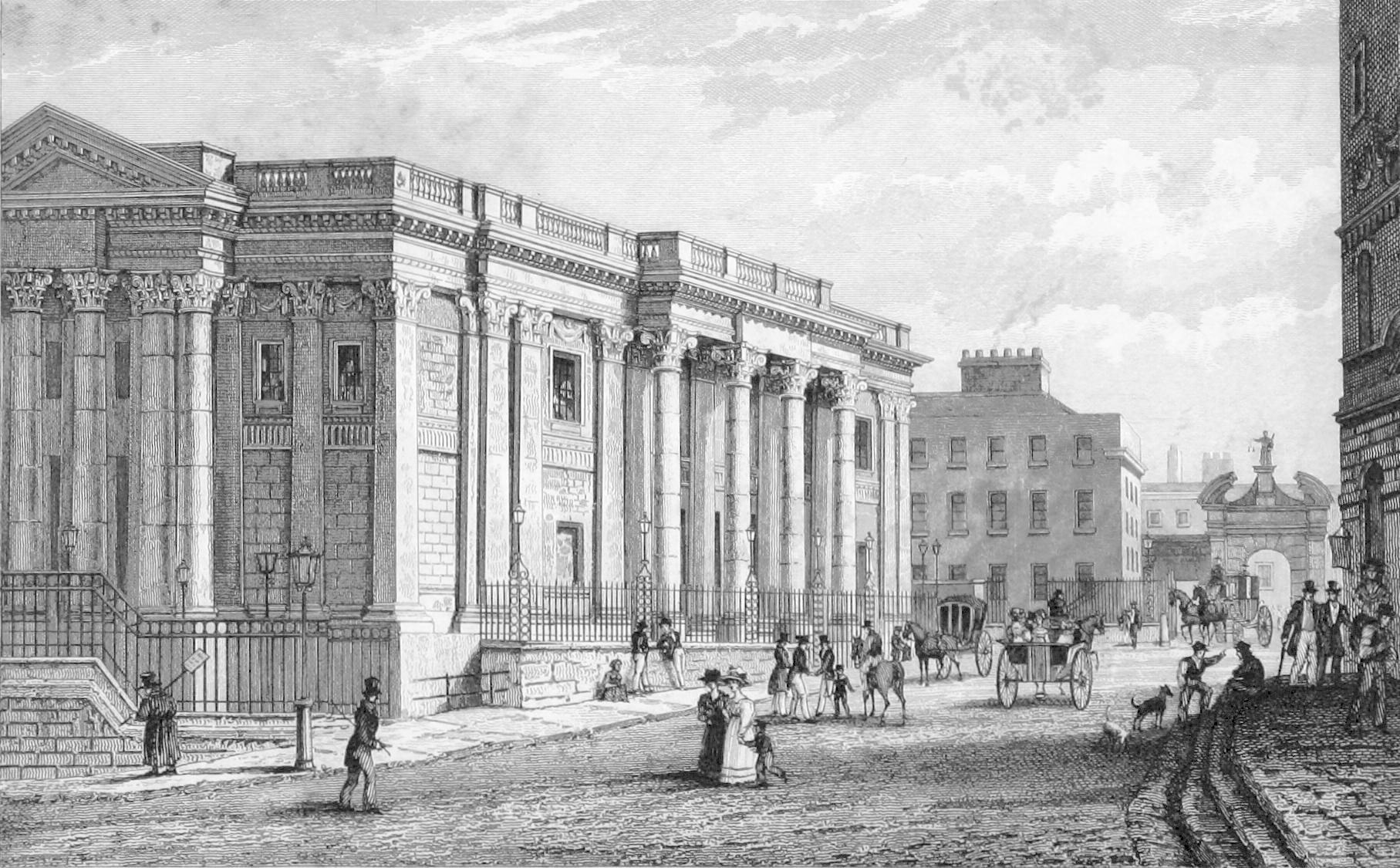
View of the Royal Exchange, 1837

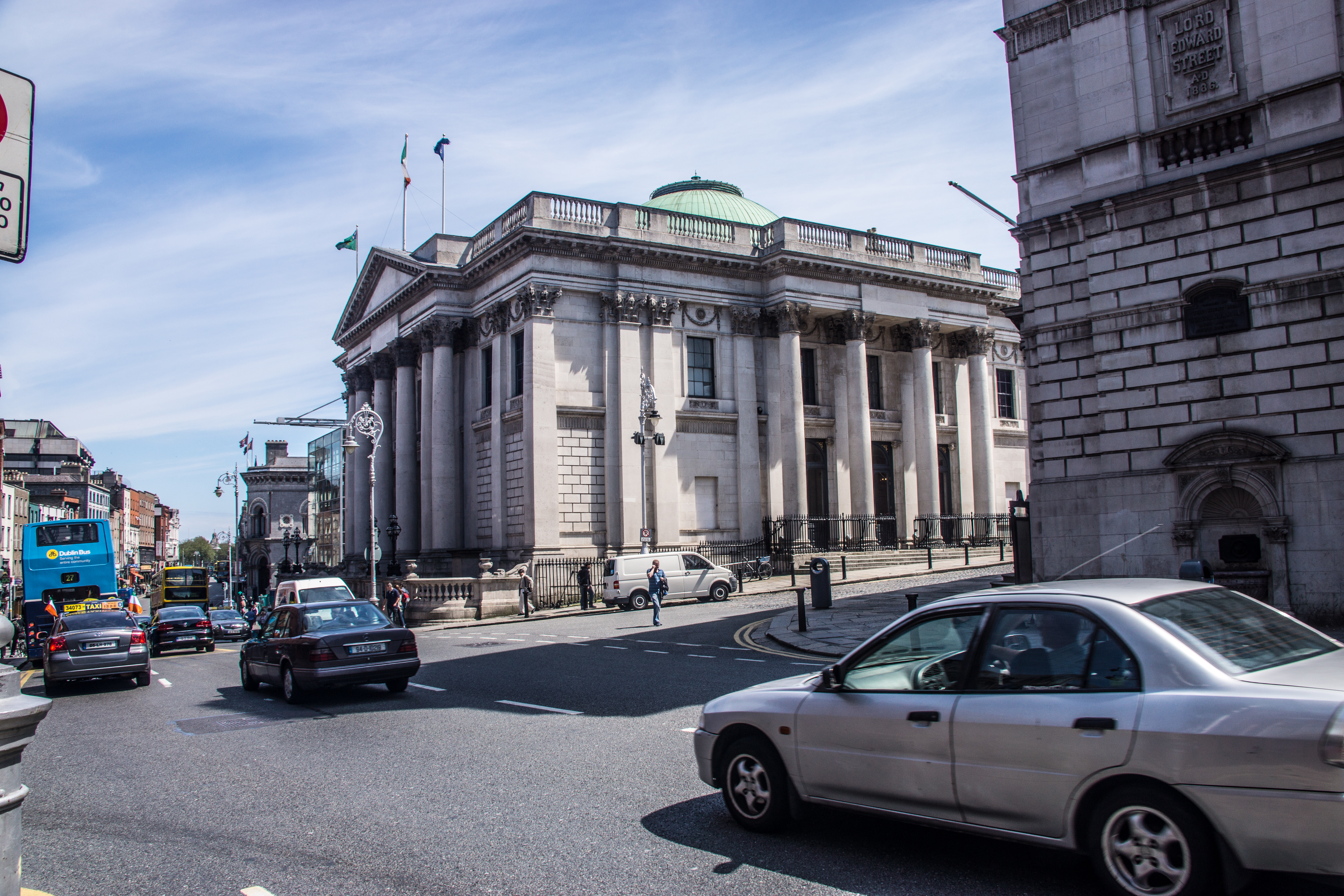
City Hall in 2012, as seen from Lord Edward St

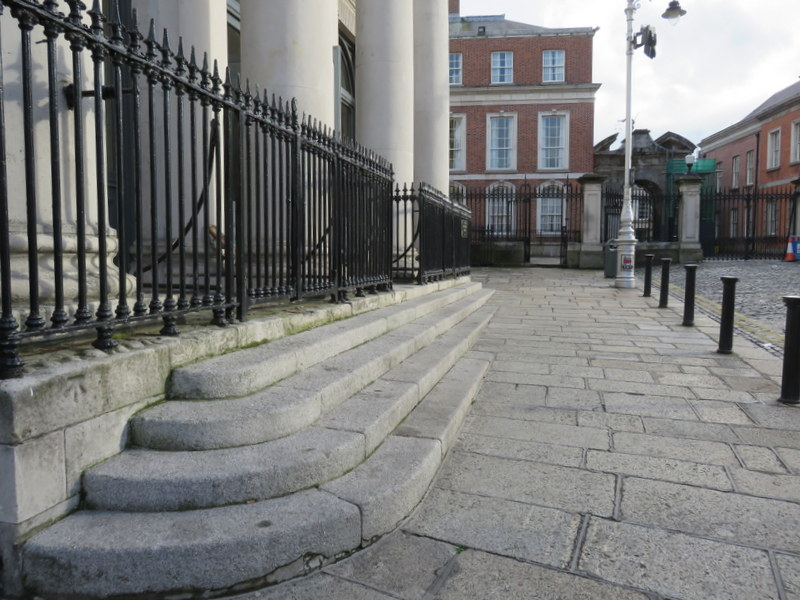
Steps facing Castle Street in 2014

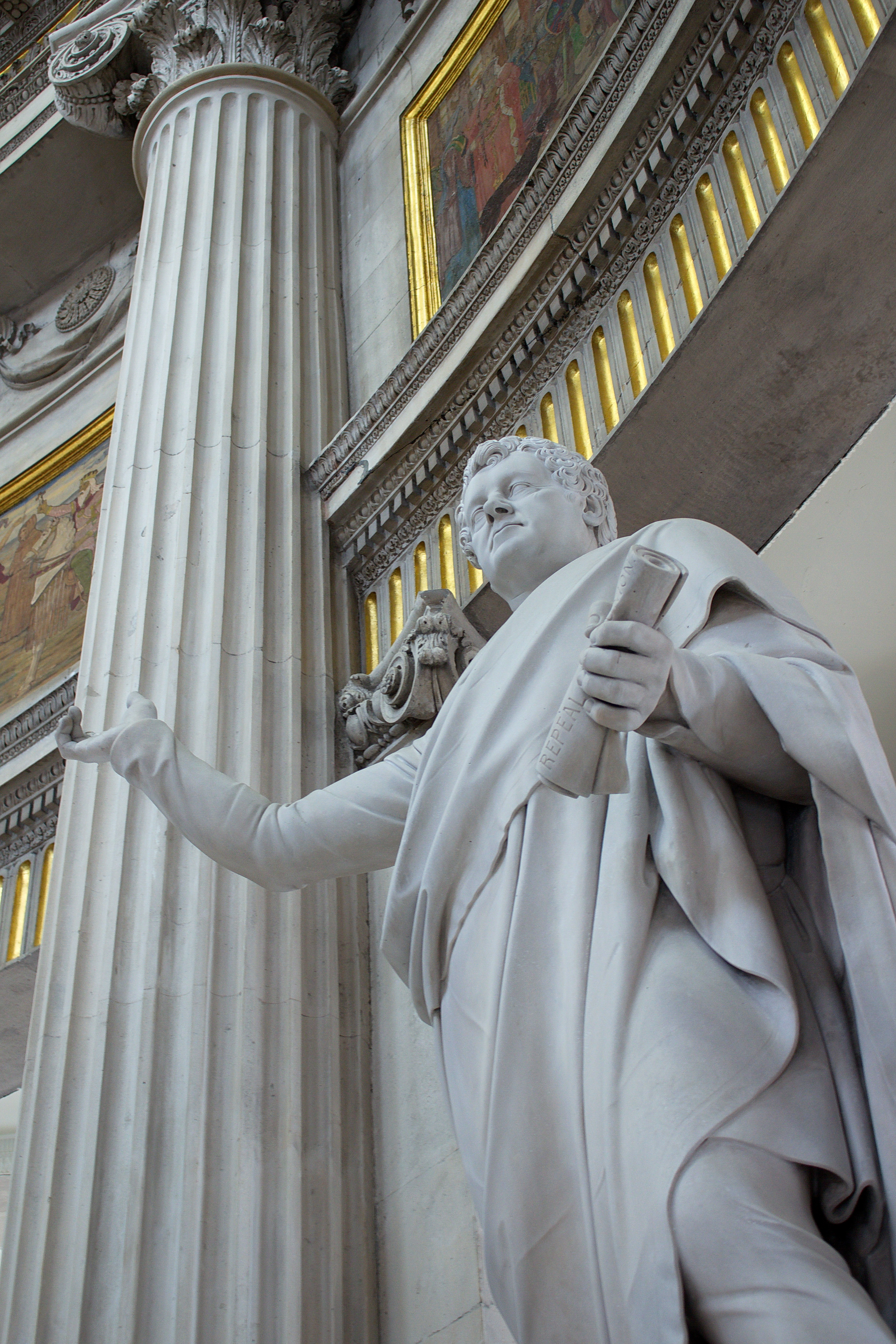
The interior, 2015

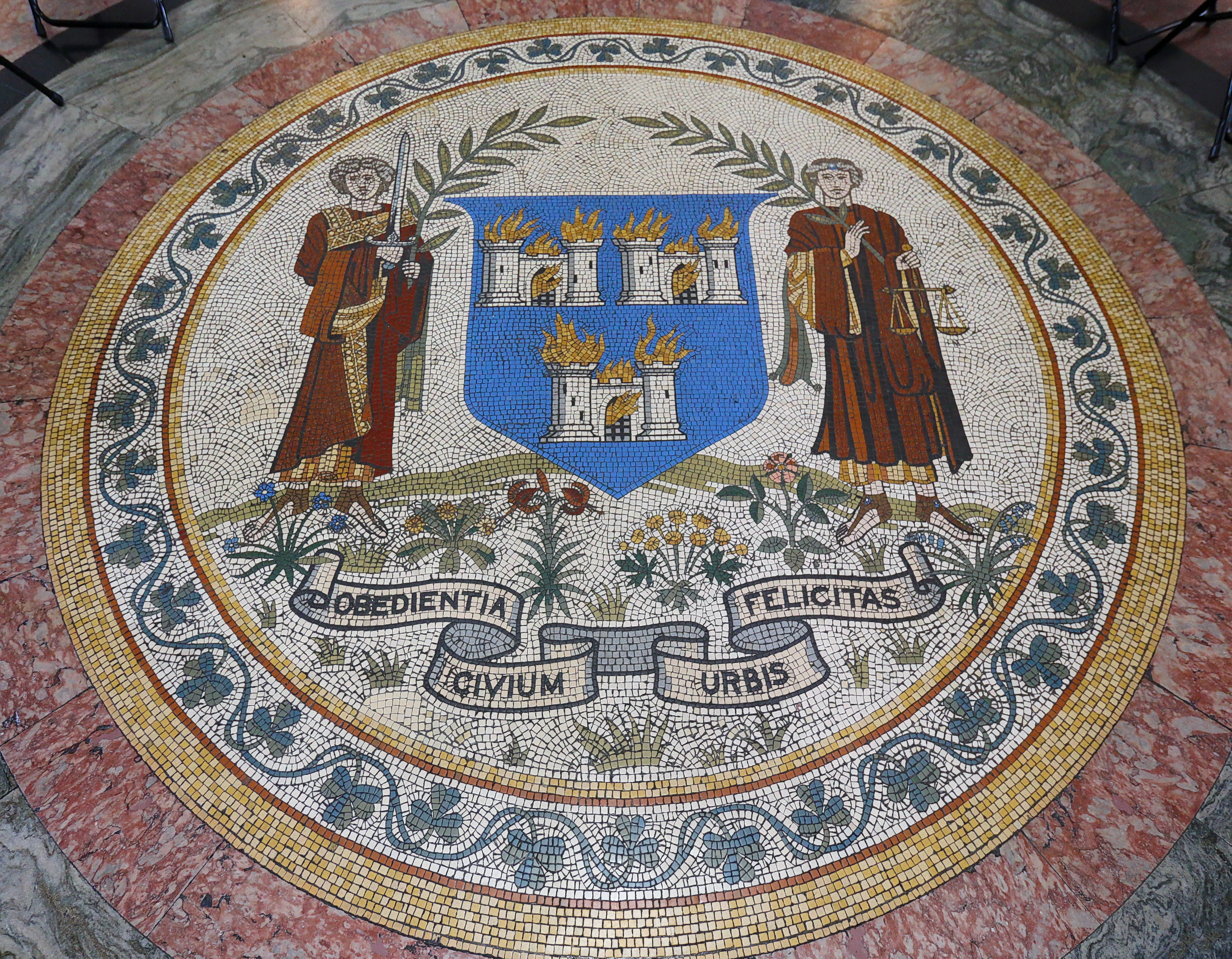
Mosaic on the floor of the interior of the building, 2015

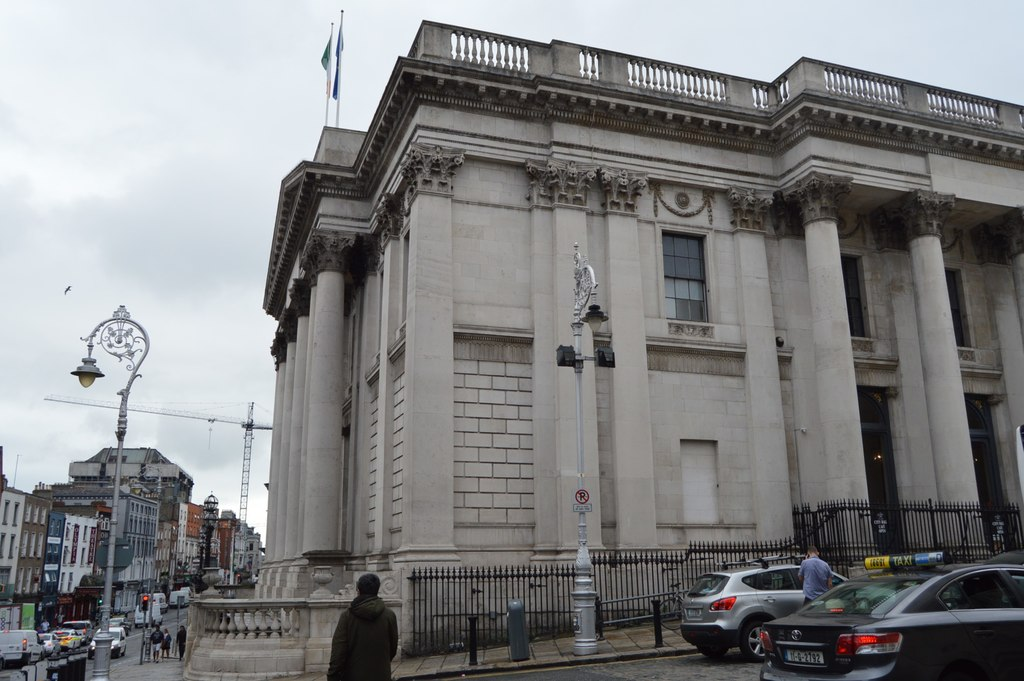
A corner of the building in 2018

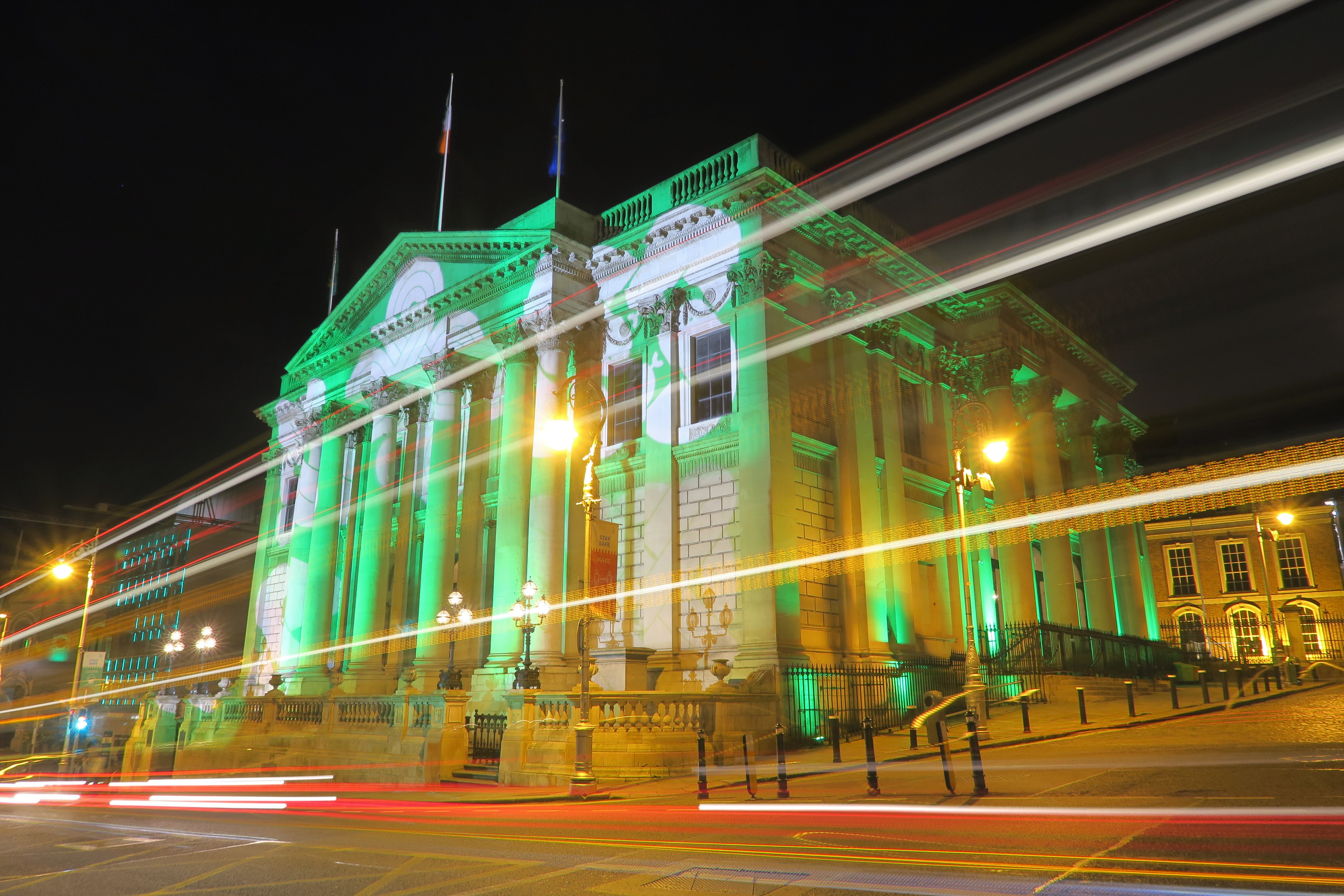
The building decorated with a projection for St Patricks Day, 2021

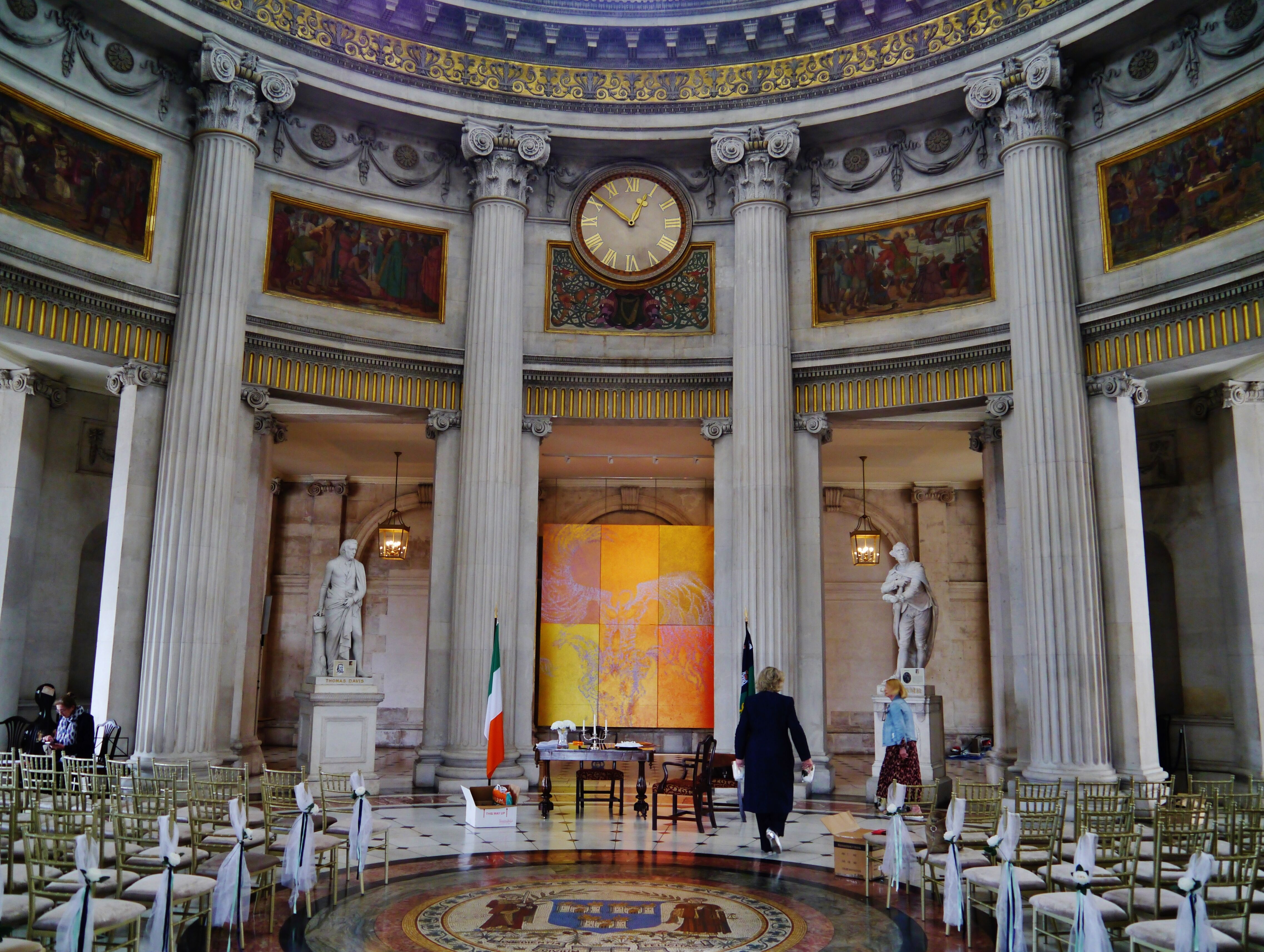
The interior, set up for an event in 2022

== See also ==
- The Mansion House, Dublin
- 18th-century Western domes
