= Royal Hibernian Marine School =

Former school in Dublin, Ireland

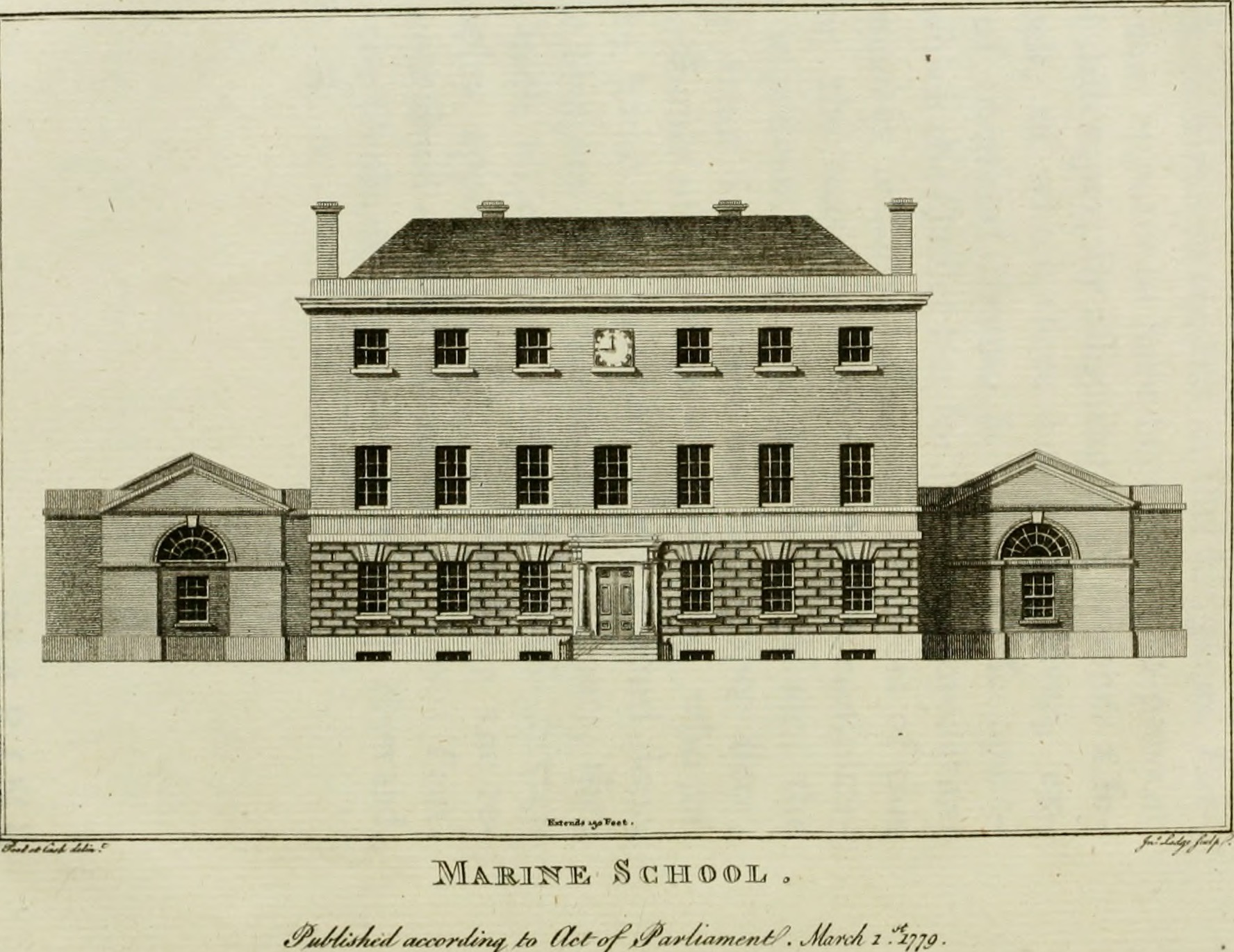
- Illustration of the building from circa 1780.
- Interactive map of the Royal Hibernian Marine School area
- Former names: Hibernian Marine School
- Alternative names: Marine Nursery

General information
- Status: Demolished
- Type: School
- Architectural style: Georgian
- Location: Sir John Rogerson's Quay, Dublin, Ireland
- Coordinates: 53.3461°N 6.2421°W
- Groundbreaking: 1770
- Completed: 1773
- Demolished: 1979
- Cost: £6,000

Technical details
- Material: granite
- Floor count: 3

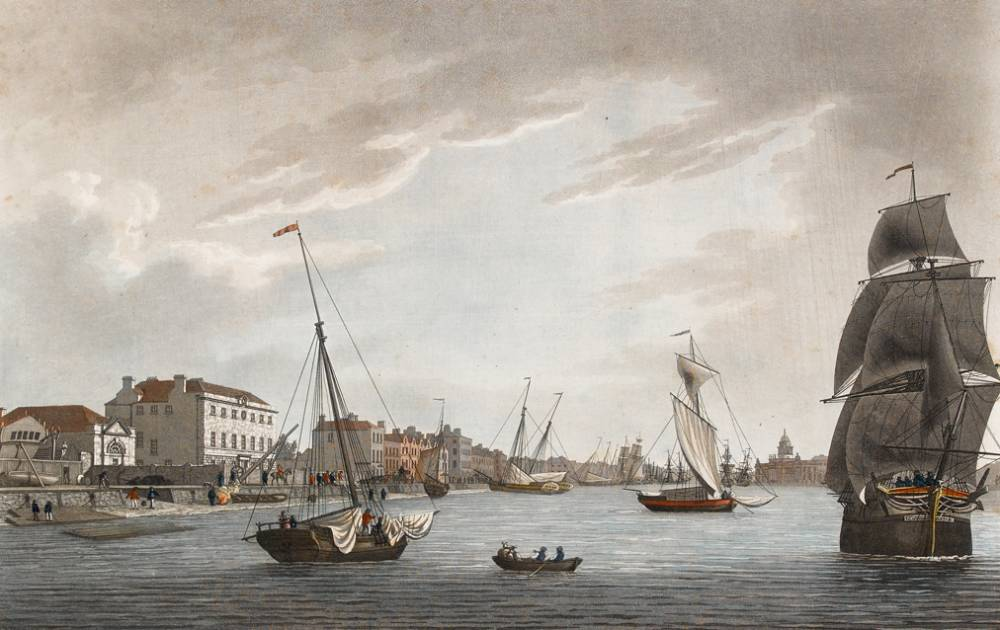
Royal Hibernian Marine School and Liffey, from A Picturesque and Descriptive View of the City of Dublin (1791)

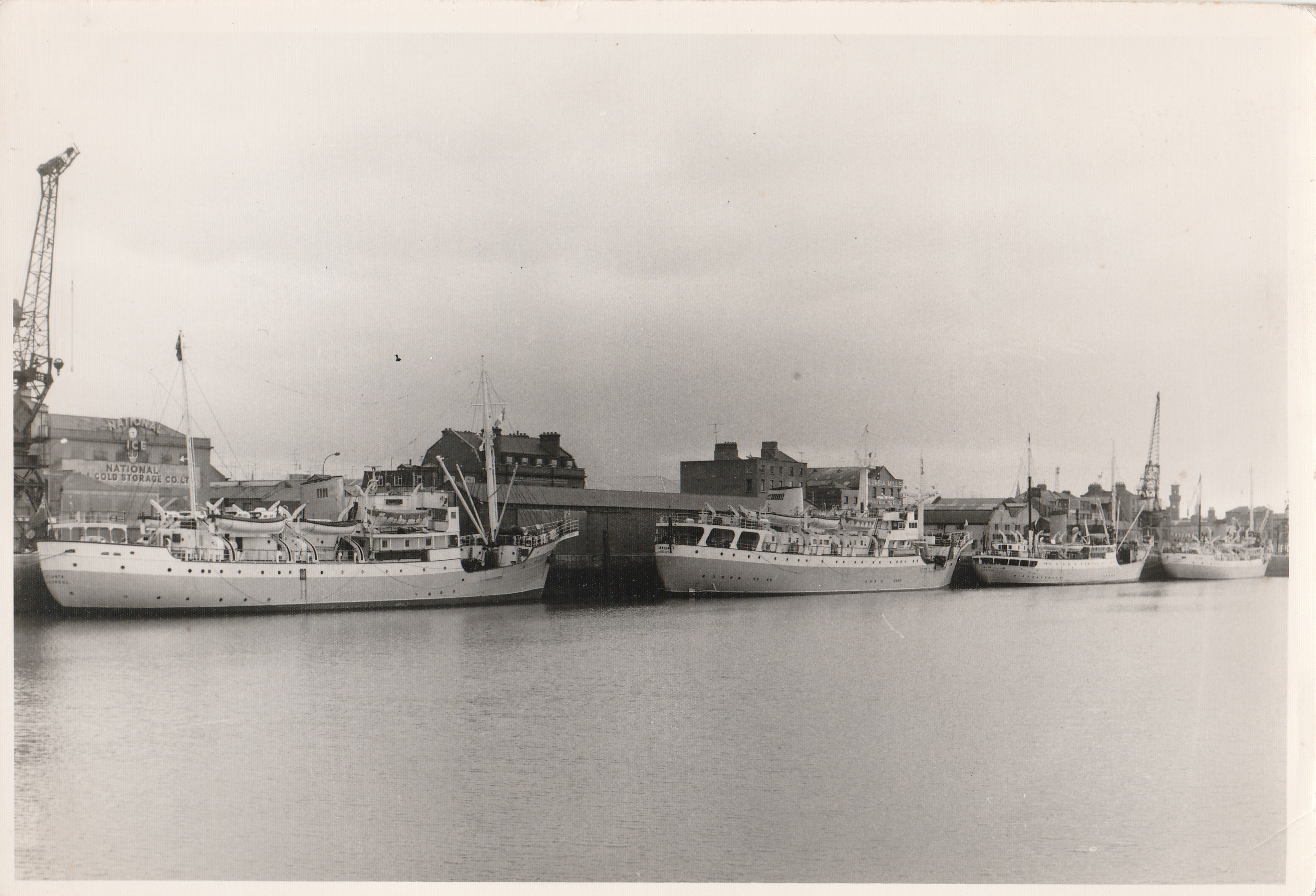
Former Royal Hibernian Marine School building as offices of the National Ice and Cold Storage Company Limited to left of photo in September 1971.

The Royal Hibernian Marine School, also known for a period as Mountjoy & Marine School, was a charity school in Dublin, Ireland established in 1766 to care for and educate the orphaned children of seamen. The school's building on Sir John Rogerson's Quay was in use as a school from 1773 until 1904 and continued to be used as offices and storage until the 1970s before being demolished in 1979.

== School ==
=== History ===
The first meeting of the board of the school took place on 6 June 1766 in the then operating Custom House on what was at that time named Custom House Quay (now Wellington Quay).

In 1775, the school obtained a royal charter.

In 1779, £500 was left to the school in the will of George Simpson who also endowed several other schools and institutions across Dublin including the eponymous Simpson's Hospital.

The school had pupils of about 170 up until around 1830 when the parliamentary grant was withdrawn and the school went into decline with pupil numbers falling to only 27 by 1857.

The school building was damaged by fire in 1872 resulting in the school moving premises to 1 Upper Merrion Street.

In 1904, the school moved to Seafield Road East in Clontarf, where the Seacourt estate now stands.

The school amalgamated with Mountjoy School in 1968 and became Mountjoy & Marine School. Mountjoy School was a Protestant boarding school previously located on Mountjoy Square which had moved to a new premises in Clontarf in 1947.

The school later amalgamated with Bertrand and Rutland School to finally become Mount Temple Comprehensive School in 1972.

=== Sport ===
In 1910, the school won the inaugural Leinster Cricket Union Junior Cup. Teams representing the school also won the competition on a number of other occasions.

== New building ==
The school originally operated from a leased coach-house and inn building near the junction of Ringsend and Irishtown named 'The Sign of the Merrion' which it leased from Richard FitzWilliam, 6th Viscount FitzWilliam via his agent Bryan Fagan of Usher's Quay and later his wife Elizabeth 'the widow' Fagan after his death in January 1761 and later again from their daughter, Barbara Verschoyle.

In 1769, the governors of the school leased a plot of land on Sir John Rogerson's Quay from the estate of Luke Gardiner for a term of £70 per annum.

In 1769, a proposed design for a new school was exhibited by Francis Sandys with the Society of Artists in Ireland. From various sources including Parliament, £50 from Dublin Corporation and from a variety of private donors, the governors of the school managed to raise enough funds to construct the new building between 1770 and 1773. It was one of the first large buildings to be constructed on the recently completed quay. It was a functional Georgian building of 3 storeys over basement of 7 bays with matching single-storey wings and contained a rusticated raised ground floor.

One of the school wings operated as a chapel while the other operated as a school room with the main building housing the children.

Most sources attribute the building's design to the architect Thomas Cooley, while others attribute it to Thomas Ivory.

An image of the building standing on the quay features in James Malton's illustrations titled A Picturesque and Descriptive View of the City of Dublin drawn in about 1790 not long after the building was erected.

The building operated as the offices of the B&I Line for a number of years as well as the offices of the National Ice and Cold Storage Company Limited before being demolished around the year 1979.
