= Flora Mitchell =

Irish artist

- Born: Florina Hippisley Mitchell; 1890; Omaha, Nebraska
- Died: 1973 (aged 82–83)
- Known for: Painting
- Spouse: William Jameson (m. 1930–1939)

Flora Mitchell (1890 - 1973) was an American-born Irish artist, remembered in particular for her mid-20th-century paintings of old Dublin architecture that has since disappeared.

== Early life and family ==
Florina Hippisley Mitchell was born on 23 December 1890 in Omaha, Nebraska. Her parents were Margaret (née Hippisley?) and Arthur J. C. Mitchell. She was their eldest child. In Omaha, her father was the manager director of the Anglo-American Cattle Company. After a Sioux Indian uprising around the turn of the century, her father moved the family to Ireland, where he went to work for the Jameson whiskey distillery at Smithfield. Mitchell lived with relations in Drogheda before moving to Dublin. Mitchell attended Princess Helena College, Ealing, London, from 1906 to 1908, where she won a number of art prizes. Between 1905 and 1906, 1908 and 1909, and 1910 and 1911, Mitchell studied art at the Dublin Metropolitan School of Art (DMSA). During World War I, Mitchell was a volunteer, and during the 1916 Easter Rising her family supported the British Army.

She married William George Jameson (born 1851), a great-grandson of John Jameson, the founder of the distillery, in 1930. They lived at St Marnock's, County Dublin. A sailor and yachtsman, he died in 1939. A few years later, she moved to Killiney, where she lived and worked for the remainder of her life at her home, Alloa. She died at her home on 13 April 1973.

== Artistic career ==
While still at the DMSA, Mitchell developed an interest in pencil and ink drawings of topographical, urban, and architectural drawings, exhibiting with the Dublin Sketching Club in 1912 to 1914 with views of Dublin landmarks including the O'Connell Monument and the Shelbourne Hotel. Mitchell moved to Canada to take up a post as a private teacher in 1919, but returned to Dublin by the late 1920s. She contributed to the 1927 Dublin Civic Week Handbook and 1929 A book of Dublin.

In 1955, Mitchell had a solo exhibition at the Dublin Painters' Gallery, St Stephen's Green. She had another solo exhibition at the Upper Grosvenor Galleries in London in 1969. Mitchell exhibited her work at the Royal Hibernian Academy annually from 1957 to 1970, and at the Dublin Sketching Club in 1967, 1969, 1970, 1971, and 1972.

In later life, Mitchell produced hundreds of sketches of the streets and buildings of Dublin, many of which are now in the possession of the National Gallery of Ireland (NGI).

=== Vanishing Dublin ===
Fifty finished ink and watercolour drawings were used to illustrate her book Vanishing Dublin (1966). The images represent a Dublin that no longer exists, as many of the buildings depicted have since been demolished, which was her motivation for recording these streets and buildings. The book is a valuable collector's item as the original plates were destroyed after the book was published, and many of the books have now been split up with their pages sold separately as prints. Her work has been placed within the tradition of recording the streetscapes of Dublin, beginning with James Malton's Views of Dublin, and was compared with paintings by her contemporary, Harry Kernoff.

The National Gallery of Ireland held an exhibition of her work, "Flora Mitchell, views of Dublin", in 1999.

== Publications ==
- Vanishing Dublin, with an Introduction by the Earl of Wicklow. Published by Dublin: Allen & Figgis, 1966

== See also ==
- List of Irish artists
