= Liffey Boardwalk =

Quayside route in Dublin, Ireland

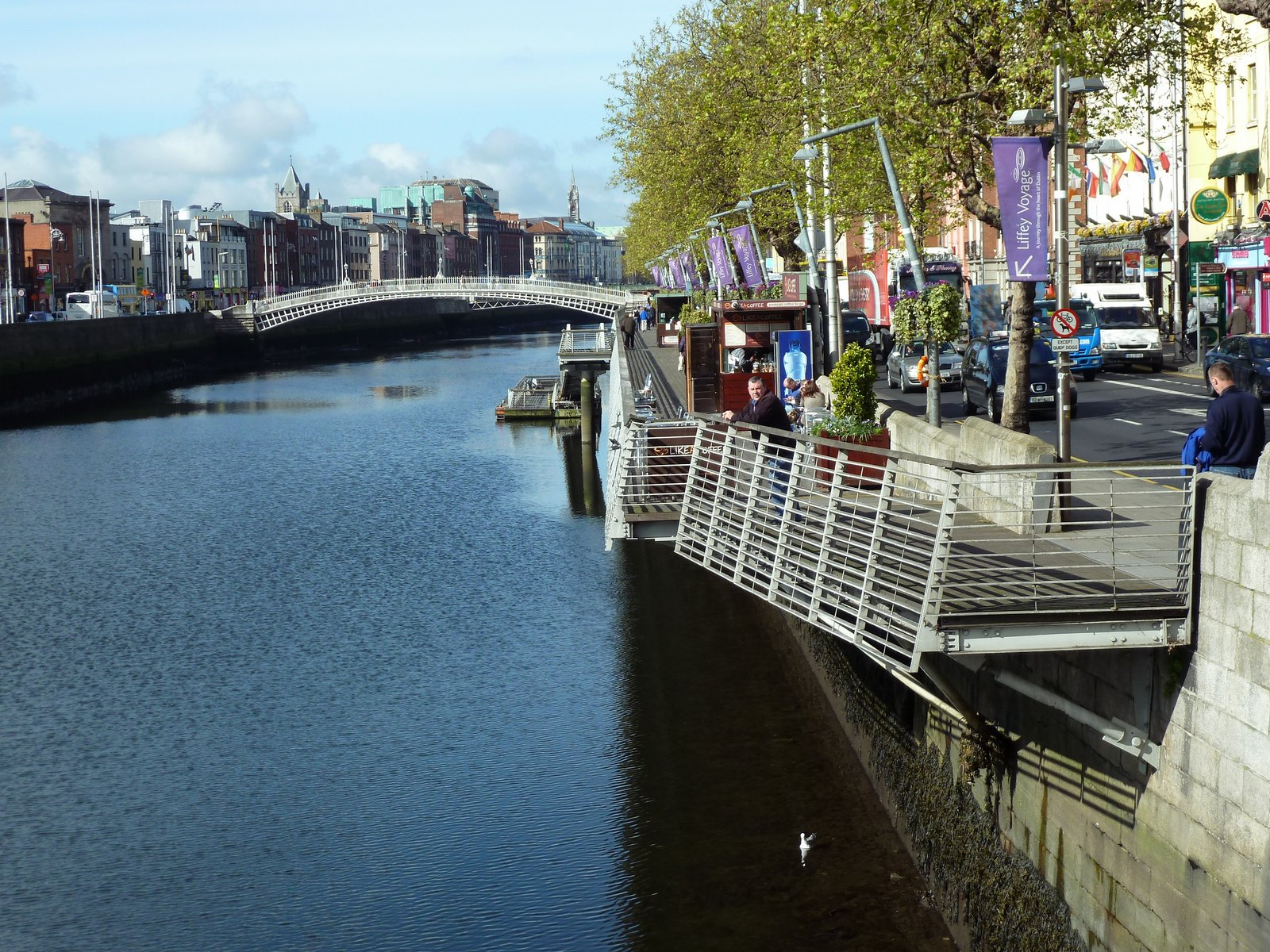
The Liffey Boardwalk in central Dublin

The Liffey Boardwalk is a boardwalk along the River Liffey in central Dublin, Ireland, providing additional pedestrian access along Dublin's quays.

It was announced in November 1998 as a "Millenium Project", and was opened on 17 December 2000. An extension was opened in 2005.

Further extensions of the boardwalk to Heuston Station were proposed in 2007 and 2017. In 2019, boardwalk extensions were approved as part of the Liffey cycle route project. Construction started in April 2020 and is expected to be complete in 2024.

The boardwalk is a tourist destination, but has been criticised as a location for anti-social behaviour.
