= The Old Custom House, Dublin =

1707 building in Dublin, Ireland

The Custom House
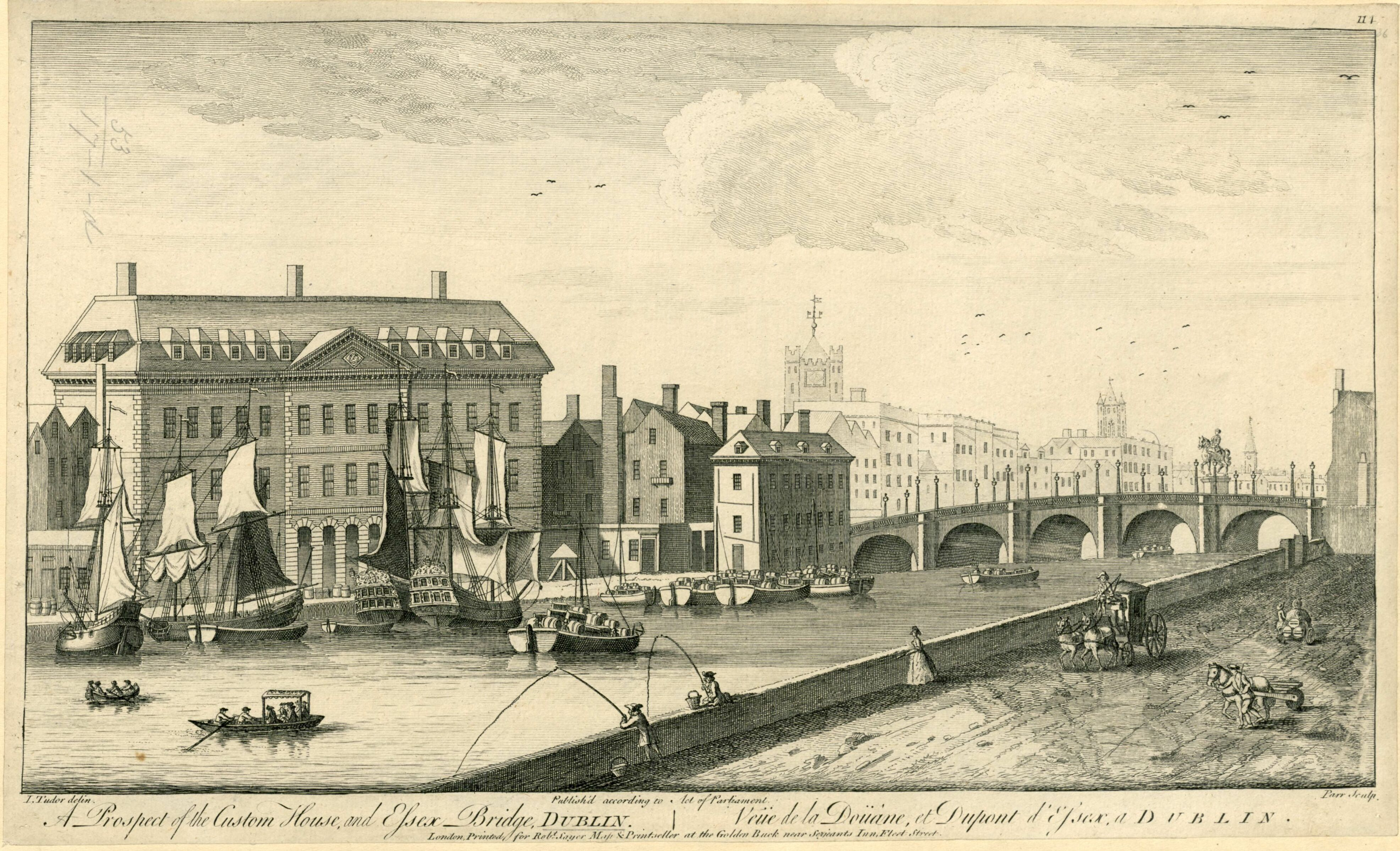
- A Prospect of the Custom House, and Essex Bridge, Dublin from a c 1753 engraving by Joseph Tudor

General information
- Type: House
- Architectural style: Neoclassical
- Classification: Demolished
- Location: Wellington Quay, Dublin, Ireland
- Coordinates: 53.345402°N 6.267017°W
- Construction started: 1704
- Estimated completion: 1707
- Demolished: 1812-15
- Cost: Estimated cost: £3317.16s (1704)

Height
- Height: 30 m (98 ft)

Technical details
- Material: limestone and red brick
- Floor count: 4 storeys

Design and construction
- Architect: Thomas Burgh

Renovating team
- Architect: Christopher Myers (1771-4)

The Custom House was a large brick and limestone building located at present-day Wellington Quay in Dublin, Ireland which operated as a custom house, hosting officials overseeing the functions associated with the import and export of goods to Dublin from 1707 until 1791. It also served as the headquarters of the Revenue Commissioners, as a meeting place and offices for the Wide Streets Commission and was said to be Dublin's first dedicated office building.

The building's main function was transferred to the significantly grander new Custom House downriver nearer the Irish Sea in 1791.

From 1798, the structurally unsound building partially operated as a temporary barracks until around the end of the Napoleonic Wars in 1815. In the early nineteenth century, the original Custom House Quay was renamed Wellington Quay in honour of the 1st Duke of Wellington, who had been born in Dublin, while the quay itself was extended eastward between 1812 and 1815.

== History ==
=== Earlier custom houses ===
Prior to the construction of Burgh's Custom House, various earlier trade halls and customs houses existed in Dublin with a similar purpose although Burgh's custom house was the first large-scale dedicated building to be constructed.

Notably, in 1597, an older custom house at Wood Quay within the city walls at Winetavern Street was destroyed in the Dublin gunpowder explosion. This location, known as 'the Crane of Dublin', was said to have been in use since the mid-thirteenth century. The Crane was rebuilt several times, and was used as a store until about 1800.

A later building was developed by James I eastward of the city walls near Essex Gate on reclaimed land in 1620 bordering Crampton Court and creating Crane Lane as a means of access to Dame Street. To facilitate the construction, James I took out a 90-year lease on a plot of land owned by one Jacob Newman. The lease stipulated that the land be used for 'the convenient loading, landing, putting aboard or on shore merchandise as should at any time thereafter be exported or imported'.

=== Commissioning and construction ===
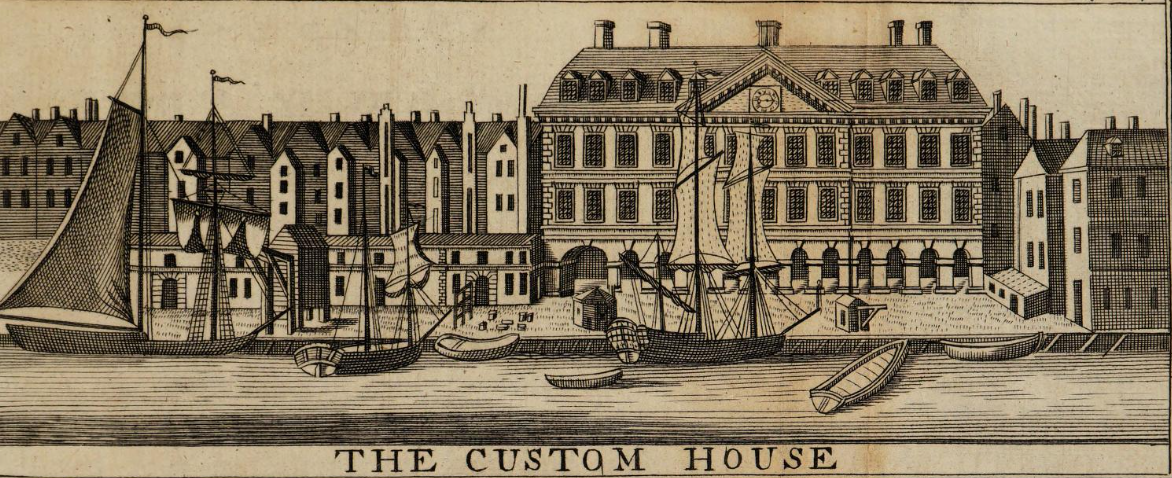
An illustration of the Custom House taken from Charles Brooking's map of Dublin (1728)

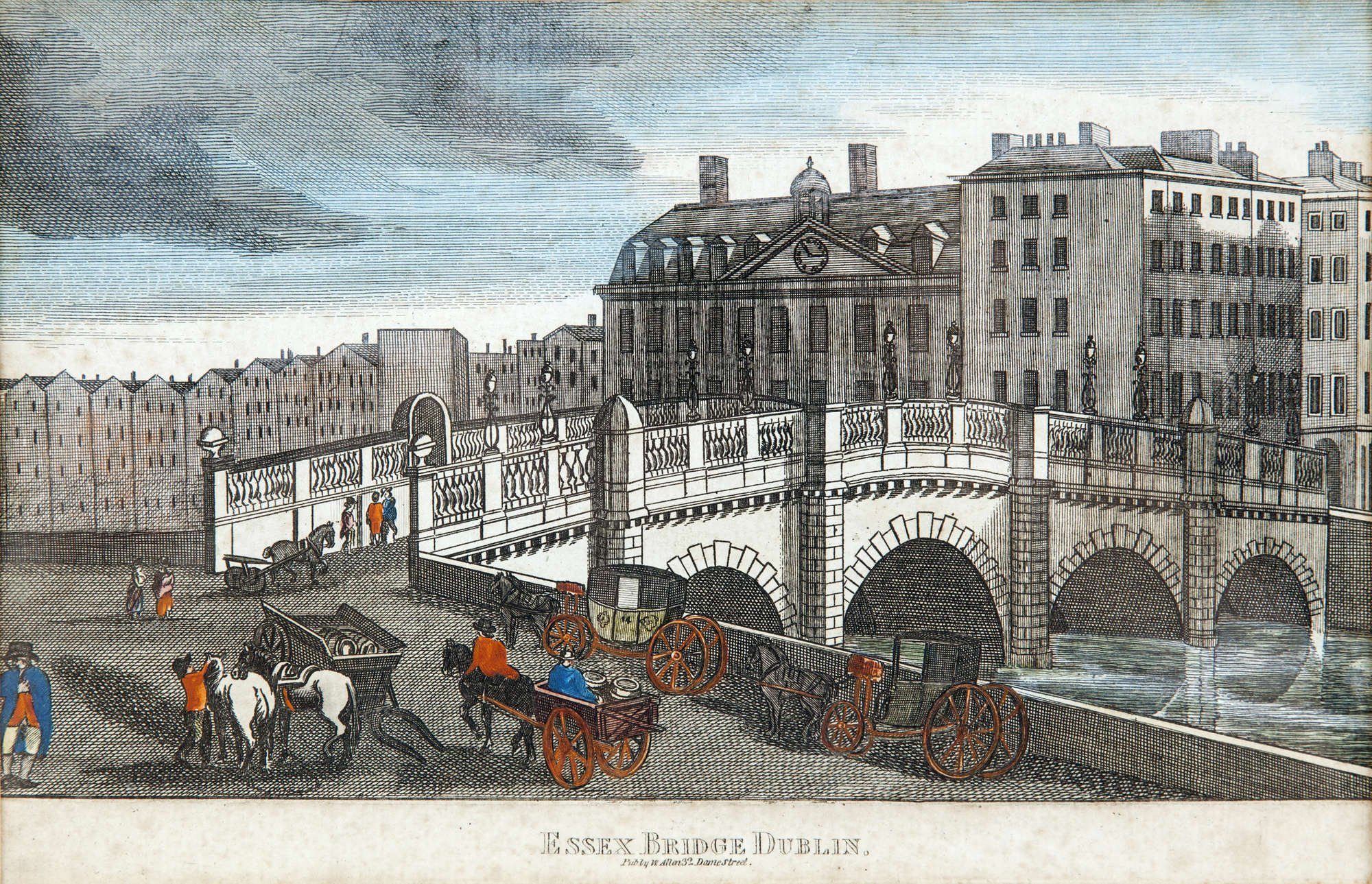
An illustration published by William Allen sometime after 1780 showing Essex Bridge with the Custom House in the background.

Further land reclamation works from the River Liffey in the area from the seventeenth century onwards allowed for the eventual construction of a new Custom House in 1704–06 on what was already then known as Custom House Quay. Commissioned by chief commissioner William Conolly and constructed to designs by architect Thomas Burgh, the building was sited just downriver of Essex Bridge (known locally as Capel Street Bridge). It was the first to be built outside the city walls of Dublin, a significant moment, indicating growing confidence in the political and military stability of the city.

Samuel Watson's The Gentleman's and Citizen's Almanack for the year 1792 notes that the foundation for the building was laid in 1707, but does not give a completion year. The Encyclopaedia of Dublin states that the Custom House was built in 1707.

The building was accessible via steps from Essex Bridge, and an archway leading to and from Essex Street to the south. Its principal entrances were in Temple Bar and Essex Street (exactly opposite the entrance to Crampton Court which was the most direct route to Dublin Castle).

=== Ships and trade ===
For much of the 18th century, Essex Bridge was the most westerly bridge on the River Liffey in the city centre, and the furthest point upriver to which tall-masted merchant ships could navigate.

Merchant ships arriving into Dublin had the choice whether to unload their goods onto lighters or gabbards to be transported by them further upstream, or to wait for a tide sufficient to carry the ship (often against the prevailing western wind) upriver to the congested space beside Essex Bridge at Capel Street where the number of ships already lying alongside the quay dictated the turn-around times for incoming ships. The port at Essex Bridge was regularly jammed with ships trying to enter and leave the small, shallow space, resulting in a situation whereby fewer than one in four ships arriving into the city chose to continue onwards from the mouth of Dublin Bay to Custom House Quay. The increase in the size of ships meant they were often even unable to approach the newer wharfs further down the river nearer the sea, and instead would lay at anchor in the bay a mile below Ringsend where their cargo would be transferred to shore with great difficulty and at great expense. Even then the cargo had reached only the end of a long spit of land, separated from Dublin by a mile of strand covered at high tide, and much further away by the dry land route.

The Custom House became a focal point of commercial and leisure activity in Dublin, with visitors from Great Britain encouraged "to stay at one of the coffee-houses in Essex Street, by the Custom House" after their 10-12 hour journey across the Irish Sea from Holyhead to Ringsend.

The importance of the site in the mid-eighteenth century is evidenced in John Rocque's 1756 map, An Exact Survey of the City and Suburbs of Dublin in which numerous vessels can be seen lining Custom House Quay, and the entirety of the river eastwards. Goods from merchant vessels were offloaded with cranes and processed on the quay, with warehouses built behind and adjacent to the building to store them. Shops, taverns, coffee houses, printers, publishers, theatres and brothels proliferated in the area with the increase of trade and mercantile activity.

David Alfred Chart, in his 1907 publication The Story of Dublin, gives an impression of the area surrounding the old Custom House at the time:

Crampton Court, near the Empire Theatre, was the unofficial 'Change of Dublin, before the regular Exchange, which is now the City Hall, was erected (in 1779). The old Custom House was close at hand, and vessels were moored along the quays, to which these northward turnings off Dame Street lead. The merchants found Crampton Court a convenient place in which to meet and make their bargains. In fact, they were somewhat loath to leave their alley, even when a proper building was provided for them.

Such was the importance of the Custom House, the Privy Council of Ireland (the institution within the Dublin Castle administration which exercised formal executive power in conjunction with the chief governor of Ireland, met for a number of years in rooms within it.

In 1764, John Bush, an English traveller, visited Dublin and made the following observations about the state of trade on the river:

The river Liffy (sic), which runs through almost the center from west to east, and contributes, as much as the Thames to that of London, to the health of this city, is but a small river, about one-fifth as wide in Dublin as the Thames in London, consequently can bring up no ships of great burden. I believe that 150 or 200 tons is quite as much as can be navigated up to the city.

Bush was critical of the standard of accommodation for people visiting Dublin, stating that "There is absolutely not one good inn in the town, not one, upon my honour, in which an Englishman of any sense of decency would be satisfied with his quarters, and not above two or three in the whole city that he could bear to be in". The best he found were near the Custom House, and advised:

Every stranger, therefore, that proposes making any stay in Dublin, if it be but for a fortnight, I would advise to have immediate recourse to the public coffee-houses, of which he wi ll find several in Essex-Street by the Custom-house, and there get directions to the private inhabitants of the town who furnish lodgings; and almost every one in the public-streets that can spare an apartment lets it for this use: and in an hour's time, perhaps, he may meet with one for any time that will be convenient for his use; but, if his room is neat, will seldom get it under half a guinea per week.

=== Suitability of location ===
In 1769, the Freeman's Journal published a proposal to link College Green and Gardiner's Mall (modern day O'Connell Street) by way of new streets and a new bridge, but the presence of the Custom House upriver at Essex Bridge meant that no bridge could be built lower down the river as it would block trade.

By the 1770s, the suitability of the site was under serious reconsideration, with merchants complaining about the amount of shipping traffic on the river, the shallowness of the water, the inability of larger vessels to reach the Custom House, and even the size of the building itself, which was too small. Another issue was the presence of a large mass of hidden rock in the river known as Standfast Dick, or Steadfast Dick, which extended from Dublin Castle to Capel Street and on which some smaller vessels became stuck. By 1776, according to historian John Gerald Simms, "the trade of Ireland had expanded, and most of it was with England, for which Dublin was the main port". Dublin had grown into "a large and rapidly developing city", so much so that continual extensions needed to be made to the harbour to meet the needs of shipping. As the tonnage of shipping increased over time, the navigational problems on the River Liffey became even more pronounced. Dublin's narrow medieval streets were also a hindrance which made it difficult for merchants to get goods on board, and away from the Custom House.

The quays were not solidly built or properly maintained at this point, and carriages and horses caused not only congestion but also actual damage to the quays. The tides themselves also presented a variety of problems, in that high water at the Bar of Dublin occurred 45 minutes before its arrival at the Custom House at spring tide, and half an hour earlier at neap tide. By the third quarter of the eighteenth century, it was understood that the building's location was no longer fit for purpose and that a move to a new site would be sensible, although the Corporation had been dealing with the question of the location of the Custom House since at least 1744, when representations were put forward by the 1st Earl of Harcourt to the Irish House of Commons concerning the matter.

Remedial works continued to be carried out to maintain the operability of the site as a quay, and in the year 1774 alone, 308 tons of stones from the shoals were dredged from the river in front of the Custom House in an attempt to deepen the channel.

=== Structural deterioration ===
In 1773, it was found that the upper floors of the building were structurally unsound which would require the construction of additional warehouses on Essex Street West. A report prepared for the Lord Lieutenant of Ireland concluded that, given the choice between repairing and refurbishing the present Custom House and building a new one for the city and port of Dublin, it would be better to build one in a new location. The council, after much deliberation and the interviewing of witnesses, concluded that "The present location is inconvenient to trade and prejudicial to His Majesty's revenue".

The upper part of the building was declared unsafe in 1773, and in March 1774, after a long investigation, the House of Commons decided that the situation of the building was inconvenient to trade.

=== Relocation ===
John Beresford, who later became the first Commissioner of Revenue for Ireland in 1780, was pivotal in the decision to construct a newly sited Custom House downriver nearer to Dublin Bay. The plans for the new Custom House were unpopular with Dublin Corporation and the city guilds, however, who complained that it would still leave little room for shipping and was being built on what at the time was made up of low-lying sandbanks and marshland. Temple Bar merchants and traders also voiced huge opposition to the move, as it would completely shift the economic focus of the city away to the east, and would lessen the value of their properties while making the property owners to the east wealthier.

Regardless of this, Beresford was still strongly in favour of building the new Custom House downstream and proposed that Sir William Chambers, the "celebrated English architect" be asked to design it. To this effect, Beresford introduced a draft bill which in turn was vehemently opposed in petitions from Dublin Corporation and the merchants. According to Simms, it was "nevertheless approved by the House of Commons and sent over to England for conversion to a regular bill". Early in 1776, it was reported from London that the draft had been amended on the advice of English law officers, and that the new Custom House should "be built partly on the existing site and partly on adjoining ground offered by the Corporation". These changes had been made on account of the merchants' objections to having to move their warehouses and business premises, which at that point were still located in the Essex Bridge area and would not be convenient should a new custom house be built lower down the river. London also directed that the river channel be improved by lowering Standfast Dick, and a few months later the Ballast Office reported that labourers "had been employed to deepen the channel and to quarry the bed of stones called Standfast near the Custom House".

In 1781, Beresford appointed James Gandon (an apprentice of Chambers) as architect. Construction on the new Custom House eventually began in 1781, and was completed and opened for business on 7 November 1791.

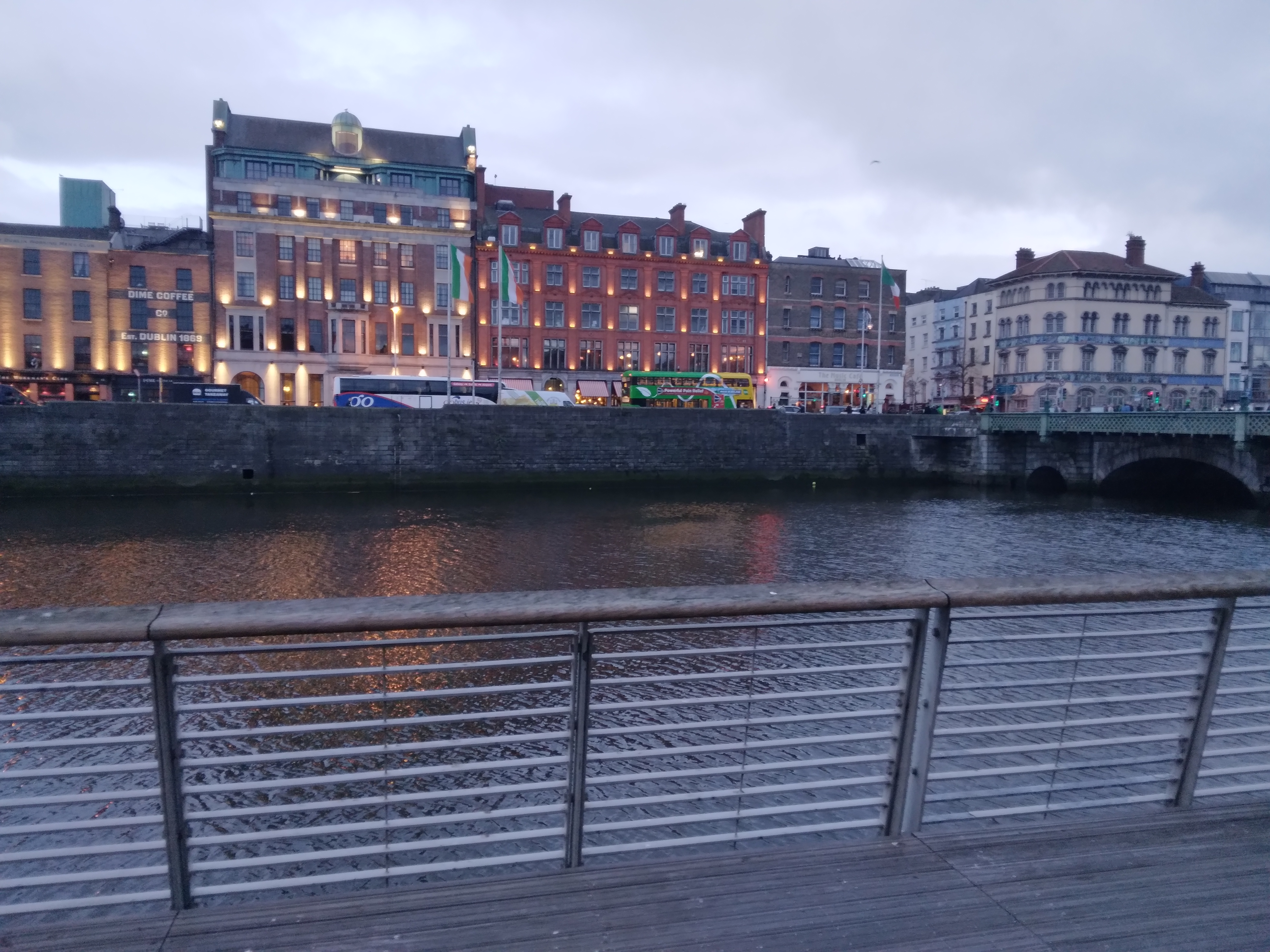
Looking south towards the site of the building in 2023 from the Liffey Boardwalk on the opposite side of the river (Note Grattan Bridge to the right of the picture)

=== Barracks ===
In 1797, the site of the original Custom House was earmarked as a possible site for a replacement for Dublin's Tholsel with designs submitted by Benjamin Eaton to this effect, however, nothing came of this. The site was also considered in the late 1700s as a potential premises for the headquarters of the Bank of Ireland, until they found a more suitable site in the former Parliament House at College Green.

The building began to be used as a temporary barracks from 1798 until around the end of the Napoleonic Wars with the stationing of the Dumbarton Fencibles there. The importance of the position may have factored into Robert Emmet's plan to blow it up or seize it as part of the attempted Irish rebellion of 1803 which took place on 23 July 1803. As part of Emmet's plan, three hundred men were to have gathered at the Custom House, with instructions to seize the gates and prevent reinforcements from getting through to relieve the other areas of the city targeted as part of the coup d'état, but the rebellion was aborted.

=== Excavations ===
In July 1886, while excavations were being made for the foundation of the premises of Messrs. Dollard and Company (the site of the modern-day Clarence Hotel), the first course of the Custom House (possibly the arcade) was revealed, exposing "handsome" chiselled black limestone at a depth of 4 feet 6 inches from the then-level of Essex Street.

== Architecture and design ==
An illustration by James Malton down Capel Street showing the custom house on the far side of the river circa 1790.

The building was 200 feet long and three storeys in height with a fourth mansard storey added in 1706-07 a few years after its initial construction. It was built with an arcaded ground floor with a rusticated granite front and the roof had a grand modillioned eaves-cornice. Historian Samuel A. Ossory Fitzpatrick described the building thus:

Custom House Quay was limited to the frontage of the Custom House, the two upper storeys of which, built of brick, contained each in breadth fifteen windows. The lower storey, on a level with the quay, was an arcade of cut stone pierced with fifteen narrow arched entrances. A clock was placed in a triangular entablature, protected by projecting cornices, in the centre of the top of the north front. On a level with this, there stood on each side of the roof five elevated dormers, surmounting the windows.

According to historian Douglas Bennett in The Encyclopaedia of Dublin, the "upper two storeys built in brick each had fifteen windows. The lower storey was an arcade of cut stone with fifteen arched entrances. Custom House Quay formed the width of the building and could berth only four small ships at any one time. Larger ships had to unload their cargoes into barges and lighters and transport them from the harbour."

== Modern day ==
As of 2026, the site of the original building is now largely occupied by the Clarence Hotel, built in 1852, the former Dollard's printing house (1885) and the Workman's Club (1815).

== In media ==
- The 2014 novel Georgian Gothic, by Albert Power is partly set at the Custom House, and features Charles Brooking's 1728 illustration of the building on its cover.

== See also ==
- Dick's Coffee House, a nearby coffeehouse, which was located on Skinner's Row
- Equestrian statue of George I - an equestrian statue of George I on a plinth which was erected overlooking the Custom House around 1722 until it was removed in 1753

== Sources ==
- Bennett, Douglas (2005) [First published 1991]. The Encyclopaedia of Dublin (Revised and Expanded). Gill & Macmillan. ISBN 0-7171-3684-1.
- Branagan, Michael (2020). Dublin Moving East - 1708-1844. Dublin: Wordwell Books. ISBN 978-1916492264.
- Bush, John (1769). Hibernia Curiosa: A Letter from a Gentleman in Dublin to his Friend at Dover in Kent, Giving a general View of the Manners, Customs, Dispositions, &c. of the Inhabitants of Ireland. London: London (Printed for W. Flexney, opposite Gray's-Inn-Gate, Holbourn); Dublin (J. Potts and J. Williams).
- Chart, David Alfred (1907). The Story of Dublin. London: J. M. Dent & Co., Aldine House, 29 and 30 Bedford Street, Covent Garden, W.C.
- Craig, Maurice (2006) [First published 1952]. Dublin 1660-1860: The Shaping of a City. Dublin: Liberties Press. ISBN 978-1905483112.
- Curtis, Maurice (2016). Temple Bar: A History. Dublin: The History Press. ISBN 978-1845888961.
- Fitzpatrick, Samuel A. Ossory (1907). Dublin. A Historical and Topographical Account of the City. Cork: Tower Books.
- Geoghegan, Patrick M. (2002). Robert Emmet: A Life. Dublin: Gill and Macmillan. ISBN 0-7171-3675-2.
- Hopkins, Frank (2002). Rare Old Dublin. Heroes, Hawkers & Hoors. Douglas, Cork: Marino Books. ISBN 1-86023-154-3.
- Killeen, Richard (2009). Historical Atlas of Dublin. Dublin: Gill and Macmillan. ISBN 978-0717145959.
- Simms, Dr. J. G. (1 December 1977). "Dublin in 1776". Dublin Historical Record. 31 (1). Dublin: Old Dublin Society: 2–13. JSTOR 30104025.
