= Liffey Swim =

Open-water swimming event in Dublin, Ireland

Liffey Swim Snámh na Life
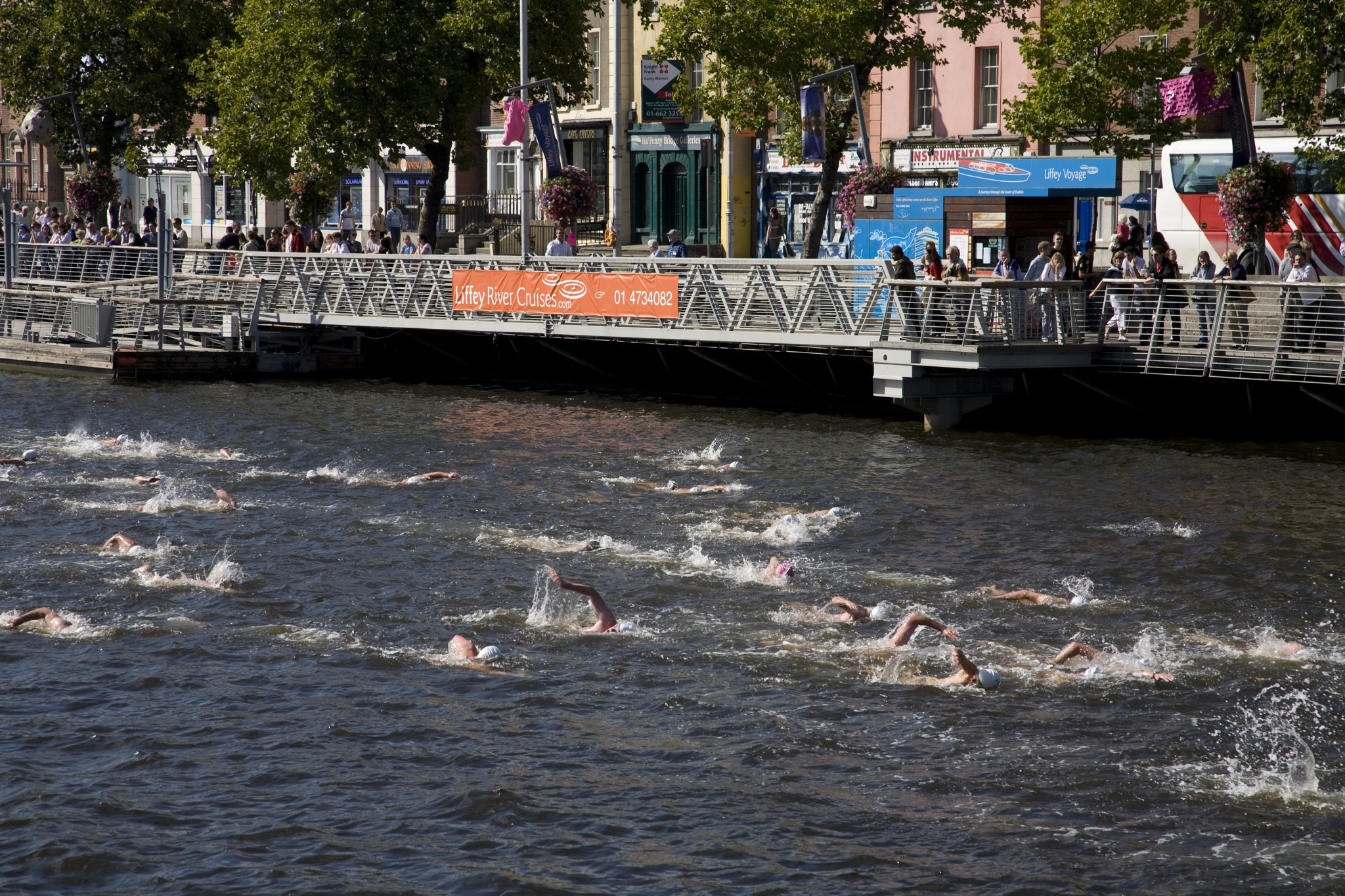
- The 2007 Liffey Swim passes the Dublin Boardwalk
- Status: active
- Frequency: annual
- Location: Dublin, Ireland
- Inaugurated: 1920
- Major events: swimming

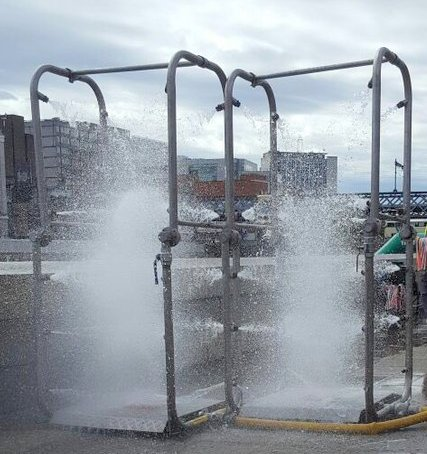
Liffey Swim alfresco shower for swimmers

The Liffey Swim, known for sponsorship purposes as the Dublin City Council Dublin City Liffey Swim, is an annual swimming race which takes place on Dublin's main river, the Liffey. The race has been run under the auspices of Swim Ireland (IASA) since its inception. The 100th Liffey Swim over a 2.2 km course took place on Saturday, 3 August 2019, starting at the Rory O'More Bridge (Watling Street Bridge) beside the Guinness Brewery and finishing at North Wall Quay in front of the Customs House.

The race is one of the last swims in a season of 30 open sea races held during the summer months, organised by Swim Ireland, and takes place usually on a Saturday in either late August or early September. Entrants to the Liffey Swim must complete a number of qualifying open sea races from the annual Swim Ireland National Open Water Calendar (up from four pre-2015). Many levels and ages of swimmers compete in the race, but entrants must be members of a swimming club. International competitors are common. The race is handicapped with the slowest swimmers starting first and the fastest last. For five years between 1934 and 1938, the Liffey Swim was run as a scratch race.

In 2020, the Liffey Swim was not held because of the COVID-19 pandemic. For the first time in its 102-year history, the 101st Liffey Swim in 2021 was swum upstream from the 3 Arena to the Custom House over an approx 1-mile course and took place on 23 October, the latest date ever, with the easing of Covid restrictions. In addition, swimmers could elect to wear wetsuits or swimming togs and did not have to swim qualifying races to enter. Winners were declared in both the wetsuit and swimming togs categories, but the official winners of the annual trophies were those in the swimming togs category.

The 105th Liffey Swim was held on 13 September 2024 from Rory O'More Bridge to the Custom House Quay; 116 Women and 168 men completed the course. The finishers' medals featured the river goddess Anna Livia, the only one of the riverine heads (designed by Edward Smyth) represented as a woman of the fourteen carved into the keystones of the Custom House. Anna Livia's head overlooks the River Liffey from above the building's front doors.

== Course ==
The race traditionally starts at Rory O'More Bridge near the Guinness Brewery and takes competitors past landmarks such as the Four Courts. The competitors swim under James Joyce Bridge, Mellows Bridge, Father Mathew Bridge, O'Donovan Rossa Bridge, Grattan Bridge, Millennium Bridge, Liffey Bridge, O'Connell Bridge, Rosie Hackett Bridge, Butt Bridge and Loopline Bridge near the Custom House. Average entry is 200 males and 80 females. Wetsuits are not allowed. The race is held in the tidal section of the river, meaning it is flushed twice daily. Due to the tidal nature of the Liffey, race times vary from year to year.

For four years 1936–39, the Liffey Swim took place from Bull Wall to Dollymount Strand (in 1939 to Clontarf Baths) because of the degree of pollution of the course stretch of the River Liffey. For the three years 1977–79, again because of the risks to health caused by pollution, the race was moved to an upstream stretch of the river near Chapelizod, finishing at the slipway of Dublin University Boat House, at Memorial Park, Islandbridge.

Due to the development of the LUAS Bridge, the Rosie Hackett Bridge, from Hawkins Street to Malborough Street, the race diverged from the historic route in 2012 and 2013 starting at the Loopline Bridge beside Butt Bridge and finishing at the pontoon on the North side of the river beside the East Link Bridge in front of the 3Arena. At approx. 1,600 metres, it was somewhat shorter than the more spectator-friendly route down the Liffey and under its numerous bridges.

== History ==
The first Liffey Swim took place on 22 July 1920. Bernard Fagan was the first to organise the race. Fagan was a swimmer and became the city analyst for Dublin Corporation in 1923. The race was swum at high tide when there were fewer pollutants. The first Liffey Swim had an entry of 28 male swimmers and was won by J.J. Kennedy, with Bernard Fagan himself coming in third. Fagan's son, Jack Fagan, later won the Liffey Swim in 1951. During the 1930s, 40s and early 50s the Liffey Swim attracted large crowds. The race has not changed length from being a distance of one and one-half mile (0.80 km), but the start and finish points have changed. The race originally started at Victoria Quay, from a Guinness Barge and finished at Burgh Quay. In 1991 the first women's race was introduced and in the early 1990s the race was moved 400 yards down river to start beside the Civic Offices and to finish opposite the Custom House.

The 2009 Liffey Swim was the 90th edition of the race and saw electronic timing used for the first time.

One of the earliest Liffey Swims was portrayed in the Jack B. Yeats 1923 painting entitled The Liffey Swim, which won him the silver medal for Painting at the Art competitions at the 1924 Summer Olympics. The painting and the Olympic medal can now be viewed in the National Gallery of Ireland. The 100th Liffey Swim was held in 2019. The 2020 Liffey Swim was to have marked the 100th anniversary of the inaugural race, but was cancelled due to the COVID-19 pandemic.

== Women's race ==
An annual Ladies race on the Quays course under the Liffey bridges was not introduced until 1991 and has been held since then as a separate race as part of the Liffey Swim programme. However, efforts to allow participation of women date back to the early years of the Liffey Swim. In 1922, a letter was published in the Irish Independent suggesting that interest in the race would be considerably increased if ladies were permitted to compete. Women already swam in races on the River Lagan in Belfast and on the River Thames in London. The correspondent argued that there was no specific rule against female participation. A spokesperson for Leinster I.A.S.A. responded informally that “such a contest was not possible, as very few of our ladies were fit for the ordeal”.

The views of the Most Reverend John Charles McQuaid, Catholic Archbishop of Dublin and Primate of Ireland from December 1940 to February 1972, on women competing in sport, in particular at the same sports meetings as men, would inhibit the possibility of a women's race for many years. In 1934, the National Athletic and Cycling Association of Ireland (N.A.C.A.I.) passed a motion at its annual Congress in favour of women competing at its athletics meetings. This unleashed protests against the Association. McQuaid cited the Acta Apostolicae Sedis, Vol xxii, no. 2, pp 72–75, the Latin text of which was printed in the newspapers alongside his translation of Pope Pius X's encyclical that “the Christian modesty of girls must be, in a special way, safeguarded, for it is supremely unbecoming that they should flaunt themselves and display themselves before the eyes of all’. Thus, the idea of women swimming through the centre of Dublin in full public gaze, even in a separate Ladies Liffey Swim, a display which might undermine the moral thoughts of male onlookers, was unlikely to occur during McQuaid's lifetime. He died on 7 April 1973.

The first Liffey Swims for women were held in 1977 through 1979, when the race was moved to Islandbridge, because the city stretch of the river was so polluted by its tributary, the River Camac, from Heuston Station, Kingsbridge, to the estuary. The Chief Medical Officer of the Eastern Health Board, Dr Barry O’Donnell, advised that swimming in the traditional stretch of the River Liffey should not take place for health and safety reasons. In consequence the President of the Leinster Branch of the I.A.S.A. announced in June 1977 that the Liffey Swim would not take place until the river water met safe quality standards. To maintain the Liffey Swim, races at Islandbridge were organised by Dublin and Half Moon Swimming Clubs. In 1977 a Liffey Swim for Ladies over 500 yards (handicapped) was inaugurated, the winner receiving the Tommy May trophy donated by the 1956 Liffey Swim winner. In 1980 the Liffey Swim reverted to a men-only event on its return to the Quays. However, what now became the “Upper Liffey Swim” for women on the Islandbridge Memorial Park stretch of the River Liffey continued from 1981 through 1990. To show that women were just as able as men in swimming distances, the race was increased from about 500―600 metres to 1000 yards in 1987 and to one mile from 1988 through 1990. This was the same distance swum by men from 1977 through 1979 on this part of the river. This probably convinced the Leinster Branch of the I.A.S.A. that women could complete the classic course of the Liffey Swim and led to a Women’ race over the same walled Quays course as the men in 1991.

== Trophies ==
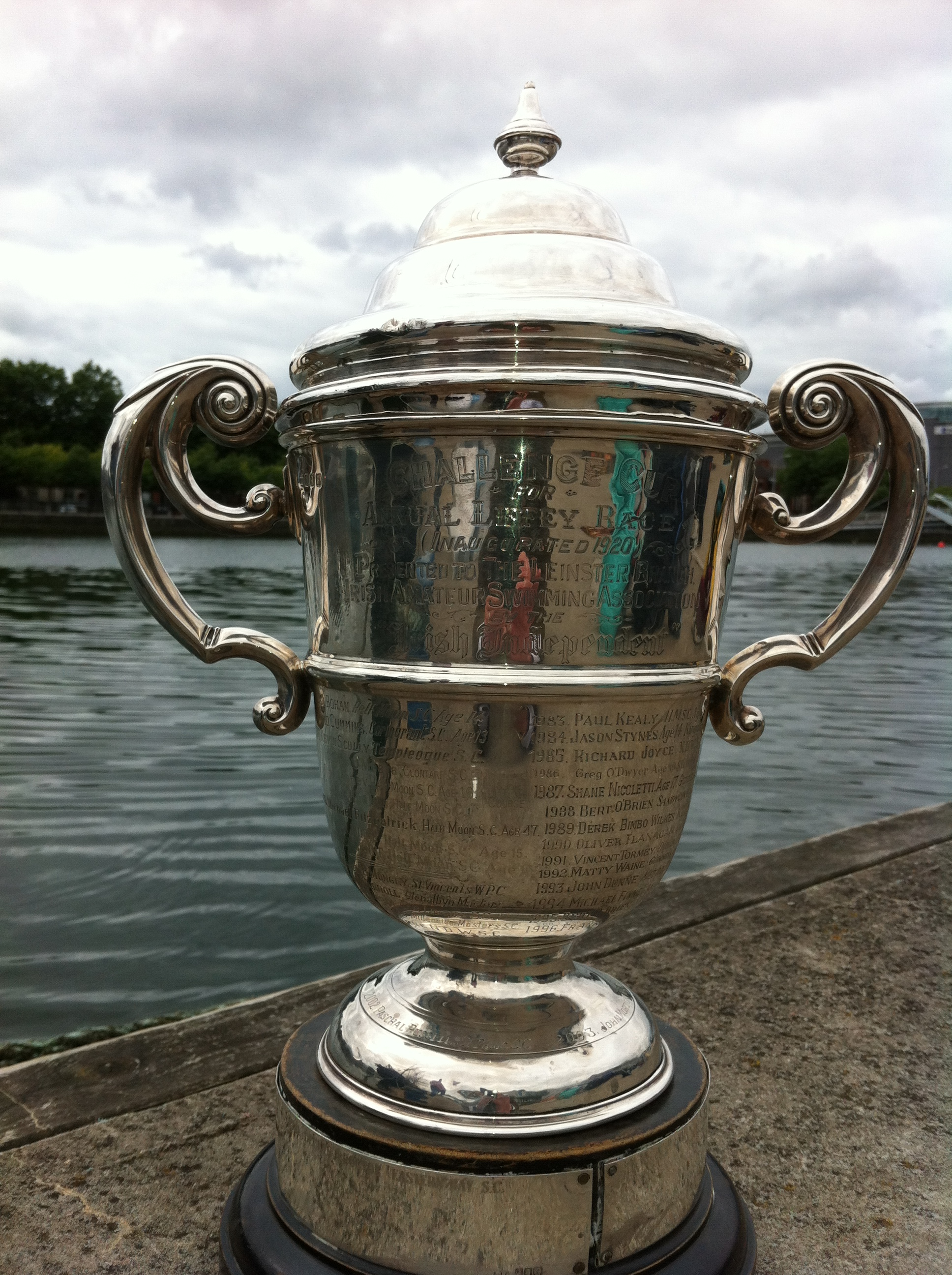
Liffey Swim Independent Cup

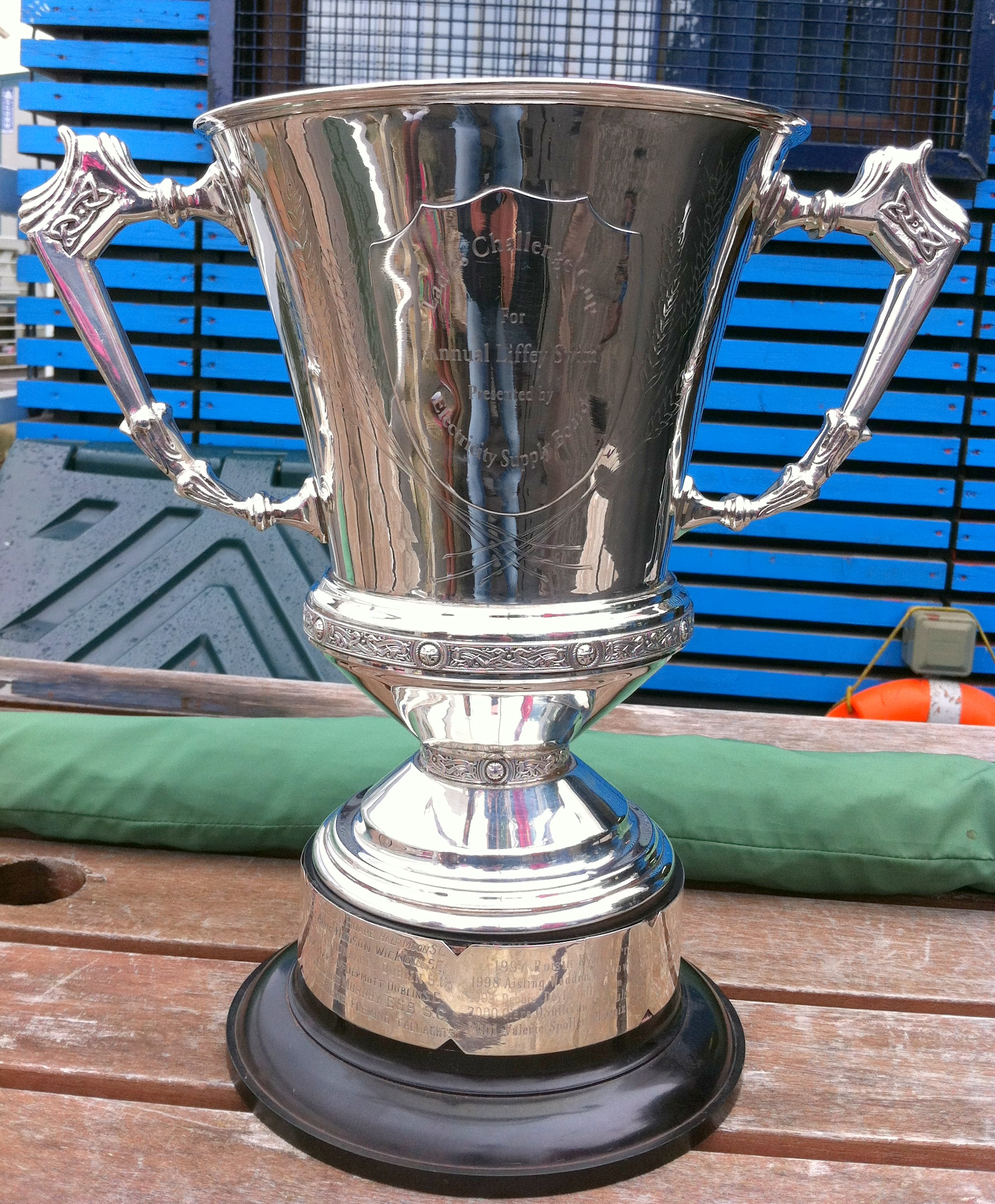
The Liffey Swim Ladies Challenge Cup for the Annual Liffey Swim Presented by the Electricity Supply Board in 1991

The cup presented to the winner of the women's Liffey Swim race is called the Ladies Challenge Cup. It was presented to the Leinster Branch of the Irish Amateur Swimming Association by The Electricity Supply Board in 1991. The inscription on the front of the Cup on a shield bounded on each side by laurel leaves is "Ladies Challenge Cup for Annual Liffey Swim Presented by Electricity Supply Board". The names of all winners since 1991 are inscribed on the base. The trophy was made by Alwright and Marshall, Silversmiths, Dublin (Maker mark A&M in shamrock) and bears the Dublin Assay Office hallmarks and date letter for 1982 (Britannia, Harp with Crown, Letter R).

Between 1977 and 1979, when the women's Liffey Swim was staged at the Islandbridge Memorial Park stretch of the river, a trophy provided by Tommy May, winner of the Liffey Swim in 1956, designated The Tommy May Cup, was presented to the winner of the race. This race continued throughout the 1980s, referred to as the "Upper Liffey Swim". In 1987 the race distance was increased to 1,000 yards and in 1988 through 1990 to 1 mile.

The Cup presented to the winner of the men's Liffey Swim race is called the Irish Independent Cup. It was presented to the Leinster Branch of the Irish Amateur Swimming Association by Independent Newspapers Ltd in 1921. The inscription on the front of the cup is "Challenge Cup for Annual Liffey Race (Inaugurated 1920) Presented to the Leinster Branch Irish Amateur Swimming Association by the Irish Independent". The trophy was made by Hopkins & Hopkins, Silversmiths (Markers mark: H&H), located near O'Connell Street Bridge, Dublin, for 50 guineas [£52-10-0]. The Cup bears the Dublin Assay Office hallmarks and date letter for 1921 (Britannia, Harp with Crown, Letter F). The names of all winners from 1920 J.J. Kennedy through 2004 Robert Clarke are engraved on the Cup. The winners from 2005 onwards are on its base. Although the cup was not presented until 1921, the winner that year, John Cyril Hopkins, insisted that the name of the winner of the inaugural Liffey Swim in 1920 J.J. Kennedy be placed on the trophy before his.

== Health issues ==
Dublin Fire Brigade provide decontamination showers at the finish. There have been concerns about the possibility of contracting Weil's disease in the Liffey as well as other safety concerns relating to pollution. Studies have found that E. coli levels in the Liffey are higher than EPA standard levels.

== Roll of honour ==
=== Liffey Swim Winners - Men ===
- 1920 J.J. "Jack" Kennedy (Sandycove SC) 28:34
- 1921 John Cyril Hopkins (Pembroke SC) 27:31
- 1922 Thomas "Hayes" Dockrell (Dublin SC) 29:12
- 1923 Charles "Cecil" Fagan (Sandycove SC) 29:15
- 1924 O'Sullivan Roche (Clontarf SC) 32:25
- 1925 Gerard C. "Gerry" Higginbotham (Sandycove SC) 30:25
- 1926 Thomas A. O'Reilly (Clontarf SC) 29:26
- 1927 James Philip Wallace (St Andrew's College) 28:37
- 1928 Philip T. Brooks (Dublin University SC) 28:17
- 1929 Dermot J. Healy (Sandycove SC) 29:28
- 1930 Willam F. "Billy" Case (Clontarf SC) 27:38
- 1931 E.J. Doyle (Clontarf SC) 32:45
- 1932 Leo Maher (Republican SC) 25:42
- 1933 John "Johnny" Ellis (Clontarf SC) 27:07
- 1934 Richard N."Ritchie" Case (Clontarf SC) 27:02
- 1935 Andrew Crosbie (Sunday's Well SC, Cork) 27:04
- 1936 Richard N."Ritchie" Case (Clontarf SC) 29:59‡
- 1937 Richard N."Ritchie" Case (Clontarf SC) 27:29‡
- 1938 Richard N."Ritchie" Case (Clontarf SC) 32:15‡
- 1939 William Haskins Ashmore (Dublin University SC) 51:30†
- 1940 Patrick Kinsella (Sandycove SC) 25:26
- 1941 Tom Hannigan (North Dublin SC) 29:22
- 1942 Christopher P. Cloake (Dublin SC) 26:35
- 1943 Anthony W. Kennett (Pembroke SC) 28:45
- 1944 Patrick G. Condon (North Dublin SC) 27:45
- 1945 J.P.D. "Jack" Cassidy (Clontarf SC) 26:25
- 1946 John "Jimmy" Rafter (Half Moon SC) 31:42
- 1947 Kenneth E. Ruddock (Carlow SC) 29:10
- 1948 David Griffin (North Dublin SC) 31:27
- 1949 Frank O'Donovan (North Dublin SC) 24:22
- 1950 Joe Grant (Shannon SC) 25:42
- 1951 J.J. "Jack" Fagan (North Dublin SC) 26:03
- 1952 Gerry Best (Half Moon SC) 25:03
- 1953 Gerry Boland (North Dublin SC) 26:03
- 1954 Jimmy Markey (Dublin SC) 24:57
- 1955 Patrick "Pat" Broderick (Galway SC) 26:40
- 1956 Thomas "Tommy" May (Colmcille SC) 25:32
- 1957 Cyril Hardy (Crusade Aquatic Club) 26:30
- 1958 Robin Power (Sunday's Well SC, Cork) 22:42
- 1959 Kevin King (Crusade Aquatic Club) 25:07
- 1960 Seán Heffernan (Clontarf SC) 23:36
- 1961 Anthony "Tony" Hardy (Crusade Aquatic Club) 24:12
- 1962 Anthony "Tony" Byrne (Dublin SC) 24:33
- 1963 Colm O'Brien (Half Moon SC) 24:25
- 1964 David Page (North Dublin SC) 23:52
- 1965 Patrick J. Kelly (Guinness SC) 22:10
- 1966 Francis "Chalkey" White (Guinness SC) 22:02
- 1967 Francis "Chalkey" White (Guinness SC) 21:44
- 1968 William H. "Liam" Lacey (Colmcille SC) 22:23
- 1969 John Mulvey (Half Moon SC) 24:02
- 1970 David Fitzgerald (Crusade Aquatic Club) 25:01
- 1971 Ultan Kerrigan (North Dublin SC) 27:10
- 1972 Fintan O'Meara (Clontarf SC) 23:38
- 1973 Paul Emmett (Half Moon SC) 21:10
- 1974 Liam Bohane (Half Moon SC) 20:27
- 1975 David Cummins (Cormorant SC) 21:20
- 1976 Kevin Scully (Templeogue SC)
- 1977 Nicholas "Nicky" O'Meara (Clontarf SC) 21:45§
- 1978 Jim Mooney (Half Moon SC) 17:20§
- 1979 Dermot Hughes (Half Moon SC) 20:24§
- 1980 Michael "Mick" Fitzpatrick (Half Moon SC) 25:54
- 1981 Arthur "Art" Dunne (Half Moon SC)24:50 ∞
- 1982 Arthur "Art" Dunne (Half Moon SC) 21:27 ∞
- 1983 Paul Kealy (Half Moon SC) 23:32
- 1984 Jason Stynes (Kingdom SC) 24:13
- 1985 Richard Joyce (North Dublin SC) 23:25
- 1986 Greg O'Dwyer (Guinness SC) 20:21
- 1987 Shane Nicoletti (Guinness SC) 23:22
- 1988 Bert O'Brien (Sandycove SC) 22:36
- 1989 Derek "Bimbo" Wilkes (North Dublin SC) 26:48
- 1990 Oliver Flanagan (St. Vincent's SC) 21:11
- 1991 Vincent Tormey (Dublin University SC) 25:29
- 1992 Mattie Waine (Guinness SC) 20:40
- 1993 John Dunne (Metro SC) 21:35
- 1994 Michael Finnegan (ESB SC) 22:49
- 1995 Bert O'Brien (Sandycove SC) 23:03
- 1996 Frank Chatham (North Dublin SC) 22:20
- 1997 Michael Mongey (St Vincent's SC) 21:05
- 1998 Frank Carroll (Glenalbyn SC) 22:08
- 1999 John Ward (Aer Lingus SC) 24:53
- 2000 Brian Mongey (Millennium SC) 26:16
- 2001 Paul Byrne (North Dublin SC) 24:31
- 2002 Pascal Russell (St Paul's SC) [age 59]
- 2003 John Morton (Wicklow SC)
- 2004 Robert Clarke (Eastern Bay SC)
- 2005 Dan Smyth (NAC Masters SC) 29:54
- 2006 Kevin Stacey (Coolmine SC) 27:24
- 2007 Larry Mooney (Guinness SC) 26:01
- 2008 Charles Harper (Dublin SC) 18:13
- 2009 Pat O'Driscoll (Templeogue SC) 26:37
- 2010 Brian O'Dwyer (Guinness SC) 26:40
- 2011 Declan Proctor (Eastern Bay SC) 39:43
- 2012 Tom Loftus (Eastern Bay SC) 23:39≠
- 2013 Ciarán O'Driscoll (Half Moon SC) 23:16≠
- 2014 Gerard Wilkes (North Dublin SC) 34:49¶#
- 2015 Donncha Ó Siadhail (Swim4Life) 31:01#
- 2016 Brian Murray (Eastern Bay SC) 29:46
- 2017 Colin Monaghan (Dublin SC) 34:42
- 2018 Paul O'Flynn (Half Moon SC) 34:53
- 2019 Mark Hanley (North Dublin SC) 35:29
- 2020 Not held due to COVID-19 restrictions
- 2021 David Wheelahan (Sandycove SC) 25:48¥
- 2022 Ken Dent (Dublin SC) 35:53
- 2023 Ronan "Rolo" Dalton (Half Moon SC) 34.57
- 2024 Simon Murray (Guinness SC) 33:42
- 2025 Derek "Bimbo" Wilkes Snr (North Dublin WSC) 36:51

‡Bull Wall to Dollymount Strand, scratch race; † Bull Wall to Clontarf Baths, handicapped race; § Liffey Swim held at Islandbridge Memorial Park finishing at the Dublin University Boat House, Islandbridge, handicapped race; ≠Butt Bridge to East Link Bridge at the 3Arena; ¶ Rory O'Moore Bridge (Watling Street) to Custom House Quay under Rosie Hackett Bridge for first time; # Race swum against an incoming tide, accounting for slower times; ∞ Died 24 January 2009, aged 42, RIP; ¥Upstream from 3Arena to Customs House, about 1600m

=== Liffey Swim Winners - Women ===
- 1920-1976 Not Held
- 1977 Ann Cummins (Cormorant SC) 6:18†
- 1978 Yvonne Smith (Guinness SC) 5:00‡
- 1979 Mairéad Doran (Dublin SC) 6:42§
- 1980 M Carolan (Coolmine SC) NT
- 1981 Louise Keogh (Dublin SC) 7:28
- 1982 Audrey Martin (Dundrum SC) 6:42
- 1983 Janne Murphy (E.S.B. SC) 10:45
- 1984 Maeve Chaney (Half Moon SC) 6:55
- 1985 Deirdre Kenny (Atlanta SC) 6:37
- 1986 Paula Kearns (Otter SC) 6:00
- 1987 Brenda Howard (Dundrum SC) 10:46#
- 1988 Siobhán Hoare (Half Moon) 20:51♣
- 1989 Ciara Byrne (Trojan SC) 17:30♣
- 1990 Gillian Murray (Half Moon) 24:32♣
- 1991 Siobhán Hoare (Half Moon SC) 27:13♥
- 1992 Anne Hudson (Wicklow SC) 22:35
- 1993 Jill Donaghey (Dublin SC) 23:04
- 1994 Mary McDermot (Dublin SC) 23:03
- 1995 Elaine Murphy (ESB SC) 22:15
- 1996 Caroline Fleming (Tallaght SC) 26:18
- 1997 Róisín Ryan (Barracuda SC) 23:00
- 1998 Aishling Wadden (Wicklow SC) 27:23
- 1999 Debbie Doyle (Millennium SC) 25:40
- 2000 Ciara O'Sullivan (St. Paul's SC) 24:15
- 2001 Valerie Spollen (Phoenix SC) 20:23
- 2002 Mary Rose Keegan (Otter SC)
- 2003 Sandra Trappe (Dublin SC)
- 2004 Colette Kelly (Guinness SC)
- 2005 Molly Molloy (Dublin SC) 30:52
- 2006 Claire Gavaghan (ESB SC) 23:57
- 2007 Sandy Dowling (Eastern Bay SC) 25:55
- 2008 Mary Kelly (Aer Lingus SC)
- 2009 Sorcha Barry (Glenalbyn SC) 25:55
- 2010 Deirdre Dunne (St Vincent's SC) 26:39
- 2011 Maria Quintanilla (Dublin SC) 32:23
- 2012 Clodagh Nolan (Carraig Masters SC) 22:35≠
- 2013 Gina Murphy (Glenalbyn Masters SC) 28:22≠
- 2014 Rachel Lee (Guinness SC) 30:15¶#
- 2015 Orla Walsh (ESB) 30:17#
- 2016 Jennifer Gilbert (Swim4Life SC) 29:46
- 2017 Anne Marie Bourke (Dublin SC) 30:36
- 2018 Triona Muldoon (Clontarf SC) 30:56
- 2019 Sinead Delaney (Phoenix SC) 39:07
- 2020 Not held due to COVID-19 pandemic
- 2021 Tara Slevin (Glenalbyn Masters SC) 26.41∞
- 2022 Melissa Corbally (NAC Masters) 41:57
- 2023 Roseanne "Rosie" Marshall (Guinness SC) 39.42
- 2024 Aislinn Callery (UCD SC) 41:12
- 2025 Liz Keary (Ocean Breakers Masters) 41:05

† 500 yards race at Islandbridge Memorial Park finishing at Dublin University Boat House; ‡ 500 metres race at Islandbridge Memorial Park finishing at Dublin University Boat House; § 600 metres race at Islandbridge Memorial Park finishing at Dublin University Boat House, Islandbridge; ≠ Butt Bridge to East Link Bridge at the 3Arena; ¶ Rory O'Moore Bridge (Watling Street) to Custom House Quay under Rosie Hackett Bridge for first time; # Race swum against an incoming tide, accounting for slower times; # 1000 yards course at Islandbridge; ♣ 1-mile course at Islandbridge; ♥ First Liffey Swim for women on classic Liffey Quays under bridges course; ∞Upstream from 3Arena to Customs House, about 1600m

=== Liffey Swim Winners - Teams Men ===
A club team competition was inaugurated in 1934 on the occasion of the 15th Liffey Swim. A scoring team comprised four swimmers, with the placings of the first four members of each team to count as points. The team with the lowest aggregate points was deemed the winner of this subsidiary competition for a special prize. A silver-mounted mahogany shield, sponsored by Independent Newspapers Ltd., was presented for the first time for the team competition in 1960 at the 41st Liffey Swim.

- 1920-1933 Not held
- 1934 Clontarf SC (1,6,7,8) 22pts
- 1935 Clontarf SC (3,8,11,12) 34pts
- 1936 Clontarf SC (1,5,6,7) 19pts‡
- 1937 Clontarf SC (1,3,4,7) 15pts‡
- 1938 Clontarf SC (1,2,6,9) 18pts‡
- 1939 North Dublin Winter SC (4,5,6,8) 23pts†
- 1940 Clontarf SC (4,5,8,14) 31pts
- 1941 North Dublin Winter SC (1,2,3,4) 10pts
- 1942 Pembroke SC (3,9,10,12) 34pts
- 1943 North Dublin Winter SC (3,5,6,10) 24pts
- 1944 North Dublin Winter SC (1,7,11,13) 32pts
- 1945 North Dublin Winter SC (6,12,14,18) 50pts
- 1946 Clontarf SC (4,5,7,18) 34pts
- 1947 North Dublin Winter SC (2,5,8,12) 27pts
- 1948 North Dublin Winter SC (1,2,7,8) 18pts
- 1949 North Dublin Winter SC (1,6,8,9) 24pts
- 1950 North Dublin Winter SC (5,6,10,11) 32pts
- 1951 Dublin SC (4,6,10,13) 33pts
- 1952 North Dublin Winter SC (2,6,7,8) 23pts
- 1953 North Dublin Winter SC (1,3,6,9) 19pts
- 1954 Dublin SC (1,3,7,9) 20pts
- 1955 North Dublin Winter SC (2,8,10,12) 32pts
- 1956 Pembroke SC (5,6,13,14) 38pts
- 1957 North Dublin Winter SC (2,7,11, NP)≠
- 1958 North Dublin Winter SC (4,9,13,16) 42pts
- 1959 Clontarf SC (3,4,9,13) 29pts
- 1960 Dublin SC (2,5,6,15) 28pts
- 1961 Clontarf SC (2,3,5, NP)≠
- 1962 Club Snámha Columcille (2,3,7,12) 24pts
- 1963 Half Moon SC (1,10,14,15) 40pts, tied
  Club Snámha Columcille (6,7,11,16) 40pts, tied
- 1964 North Dublin Winter SC (1,2,8,9) 20pts
- 1965 Club Snámha Columcille (3,5, NP, NP)≠
- 1966 Club Snámha Columcille (3,8,12, NP)≠
- 1967 Half Moon SC (2,3,4,5) 14pts
- 1968 Half Moon SC (2,3,5, NP)≠
- 1969 Club Snámha Columcille (2,3,7,10) 22pts
- 1970 Guinness SC (5,6,7,??)
- 1971 Half Moon SC (2,6,13,15) 36pts
- 1972 Half Moon SC (2,3,4,8) 17pts
- 1973 Half Moon SC (1,2,7,16) 26pts
- 1974 Half Moon SC (1,2,7,9) 19pts
- 1975 Dublin SC (2,7,9,12) 30pts
- 1976 Templeogue SC (1,2,11,12) 26pts
- 1977 North Dublin Winter SC (2,7,10, NP)≠§
- 1978 Half Moon SC (1,2,3,6) 12pts§
- 1979 Half Moon SC (1,2,6, NP)≠§
- 1980 Half Moon SC (1,3,7,8) 19pts
- 1981 Half Moon SC (1,2,7,8) 19pts
- 1982 Half Moon SC (1,4,5,8) 18pts
- 1983 Half Moon SC (1,2,5,7) 15pts
- 1984 Half Moon SC (4,6,8,10) 28pts
- 1985 Half Moon SC (2,3,4,5) 14pts
- 1986 Atlanta Metropolitan SC (2,3,12,18) 35pts
- 1987 North Dublin Winter SC (15,16,21,25) 77 pts
- 1988 Clontarf SC (2,10,18,22) 51pts
- 1989 North Dublin Winter SC (1,2,7,8) 18pts
- 1990 Guinness SC (3,4,5,6) 18pts
- 1991 Half Moon SC (4,6,11,15) 36pts
- 1992 Guinness SC (1,2,7,15) 25pts
- 1993 Metropolitan SC (1,4,9,10) 24 pts
- 1994 St. Vincent's SC (6,11,22,30) 69pts
- 1995 Glenalbyn SC (6,12,19,21) 58pts
- 1996 Sandycove SC (2,8,11,25) 46pts
- 1997 St Vincent's SC (1,2,11,19) 33pts
- 1998 Glenalbyn SC (1,3,16,28) 48pts
- 1999 Guinness SC (4,5,6, NP)≠
- 2000 Half Moon SC (NP, NP, NP, NP)≠
- 2001 Half Moon SC (2,14, NP,32)≠
- 2002 Half Moon SC
- 2003 Guinness SC
- 2004
- 2005 St Vincent's SC (3,11,14,29) 57pts
- 2006 Sandycove SC (4,12,13,23) 52pts
- 2007 Guinness SC (1,2,9,22) 34pts
- 2008 Guinness SC (5,11,18,22) 56pts, tied
  NAC Masters SC (7,9,12,28) 56pts, tied
- 2009 Sandycove SC (7,17,18,23) 65pts
- 2010 Eastern Bay SC (2,5,14,17) 38pts
- 2011 Sandycove SC (9,11,24,44) 88pts
- 2012 Eastern Bay (1,3,8,10) 22pts♦
- 2013 North Dublin Winter SC (4,10,16,21) 51pts♦
- 2014 NAC Masters SC (1,3,32,33) 66pts¶
- 2015 North Dublin SC (2,3,9,26) 34pts
- 2016 NAC Masters SC (8,9,11,14) 42pts
- 2017 Clontarf SC (4,13,15,16) 48pts
- 2018 Sandycove SC (4,5,9,11) 29pts
- 2019 Sandycove SC (2,5,8,9) 24pts
- 2020 Not held due to COVID-19 restrictions
- 2021 NAC Masters (3,8,14,18) 43pts∞
- 2022 NAC Masters (5,8,9,27) 49pts
- 2023 Dublin SC (2,6,7,19) 34 pts
- 2024 Sandycove SC (2,3,11,12) 28 pts
- 2025 Templeogue SC (5,9,16,21) 51 pts

‡ Bull Wall to Dollymount Strand, scratch race; † Bull Wall to Clontarf Baths, handicapped race; § Liffey Swim held at Islandbridge Memorial Park finishing at the slipway of Dublin University Boat House, Islandbridge, handicapped race; ≠ NP=Not published in newspaper reports; ♦ Butt Bridge to East Link Bridge at the 3Arena; ¶ Rory O'Moore Bridge (Watling Street) to Custom House Quay under Rosie Hackett Bridge for first time; ∞Upstream from 3Arena to Customs House, about 1600m

=== Liffey Swim Winners - Teams Women ===
- 1920-1976 Not held
- 1977 Otter SC (2,4,??)†
- 1978 Guinness SC (1,2,3,11) 17pts‡
- 1979 Dublin SC (1,2,5, xx)
- 1980 Coolmine SC (1,2,3, xx)
- 1981 Dublin SC (1,2,5, xx)
- 1982 Dublin SC (2,3,4,8) 17pts
- 1983 E.S.B. SC (1, xx, xx, xx)
- 1984 Dundrum SC (6,8,12,14) 40pts
- 1985 Barracuda SC (2,3,4,6) 15pts
- 1986 Otter SC (1,5,10,12) 28pts
- 1987 Wicklow SC (2,3,5,9) 19pts#
- 1988 Wicklow SC, tied
  Dundrum SC, tied♣
- 1989 Dundrum SC (3, xx, xx, xx)♣
- 1990 Dundrum SC (3,15,16, xx)♣
- 1991 Glenalbyn SC (2,8,10,14) 34pts♥
- 1992
- 1993 Glenalbyn SC (4,10,12,13) 39pts
- 1994 Glenalbyn SC (2,3,4,11) 20pts
- 1995 Polar Bears SC (2,4,20,45) 71pts
- 1996 Polar Bears SC (11,13,14,20) 58pts
- 1997 Polar Bears SC (2,7,9,29) 47pts
- 1998 Dundrum SC (6,7,10,28) 51pts
- 1999 Millennium SC (1,2,5,??)
- 2000 Dublin SC (3,??.??,??)
- 2001
- 2002
- 2003
- 2004
- 2005 Dublin SC (1,13,17,18) 49pts
- 2006 Dublin SC (6,7,11,17) 41pts
- 2007 Eastern Bay SC (1,3,11,17) 32pts
- 2008 Dublin SC (4,7,9,19) 39pts
- 2009 Glenalbyn Masters SC (1,3,5,8) 17pts
- 2010 Eastern Bay SC (6,7,8,17) 38pts
- 2011 Glenalbyn Masters SC (4,6,13,14) 37pts
- 2012 Dublin SC (5,7,13,14) 39pts♦
- 2013 Glenalbyn Masters SC (1,7,8,13) 29pts♦
- 2014 Dublin SC (3,11,19,26) 59pts¶
- 2015 NAC Masters SC (7,10,15,17) 49pts
- 2016 Dublin SC (2,8,9,10) 29pts
- 2017 Dublin SC (1,9,11,12) 33pts
- 2018 Glenalbyn Masters (2,5,6,9) 22pts
- 2019 Phoenix SC (1,9,15,21) 46pts
- 2020 Not held due to COVID-19 pandemic
- 2021 Dublin SC (2,9,17,19) 47pts∞
- 2022 NAC Masters (1,2,4,13) 20pts
- 2023 Glenalbyn Masters (3,5,12,19) 39 pts
- 2024 Glenalbyn Masters (6,13,18,19) 56 pts
- 2025 NAC Masters (9,12,15,17) 53 pts

† 500 yards race at Islandbridge Memorial Park finishing at Dublin University Boat House, three to score; ‡ 500 metres race at Islandbridge Memorial Park finishing at Dublin University Boat House; § 600 metres race at Islandbridge Memorial Park finishing at Dublin University Boat House, Islandbridge; ♦ Butt Bridge to East Link Bridge at the 3Arena; ¶ Rory O'Moore Bridge (Watling Street) to Custom House Quay under Rosie Hackett Bridge for first time; # Race swum against an incoming tide, accounting for slower times; # 1000 yards course at Islandbridge; ♣ 1-mile course at Islandbridge; ♥ First Liffey Swim for women on classic Liffey Quays under bridges course; ∞Upstream from 3Arena to Customs House, about 1600m

=== Liffey Swim - Fastest Men ===
- 1920 C.R. Walsh (Sandycove SC) 27:25 (13th)
- 1921 Ernest Edmondson Benson (Dublin University SC) (4th)
- 1922 C.R. Walsh (Sandycove SC) 27:10 (placing not reported)
- 1923 Cecil Fagan (Sandycove SC) 29:15 (1st)
- 1924
- 1925 Ian Henry Macreight Macredy (Pembroke SC) 27:00 (9th), tied;
  K.J. McLean§ (Pembroke SC) 27:00 (17th), tied
- 1926 C.P. Kenna (Sandycove SC) 27:31 (2nd)
- 1927 Cecil Fagan (Sandycove SC) 26:35 (7th)
- 1928 Philip T Brooks (Dublin University SC) 28:17 (1st)
- 1929 C.P. Kenna (Sandycove SC) 26:55 (3rd)
- 1930 J. Leo O'Brien (Sandycove SC) 25:00 (19th)
- 1931
- 1932 Leo Maher (Republican SC) 25:42 (1st)
- 1933 Philip Hannigan (Republican SC) 25:32 (2nd)
- 1934 Richard N."Ritchie" Case (Clontarf SC) 27:02 (1st)‡
- 1935 Andrew Crosbie (Sunday's Well SC, Cork) 27:04 (1st)‡
- 1936 Richard N."Ritchie" Case (Clontarf SC) 29:59 (1st)‡
- 1937 Richard N."Ritchie" Case (Clontarf SC) 27:29 (1st)‡
- 1938 Richard N."Ritchie" Case (Clontarf SC) 32:15 (1st)‡
- 1939 Richard N."Ritchie" Case (Clontarf SC) 50:26 (2nd)#
- 1940
- 1941 W.H.H. Deane (Sandycove SC) 25:25 (28th)
- 1942 William H. Ashmore (Dublin University SC) 23:00
- 1943 William P. "Bill" Hawkins (Dublin SC) 25:05 (2nd)
- 1944 William P. "Bill" Hawkins (Dublin SC) 24:01 (3rd)
- 1945 Des Corbett (Bray Cove SC) 23:25 (15th)
- 1946 Jimmy Rafter (Half Moon SC) 31:42 (1st)
- 1947 Patrick G. Condon (North Dublin WSC) 26:43 (2nd)
- 1948 William P. "Bill" Hawkins (Dublin SC) 27:45 (10th)
- 1949 John Caldwell "Jack" Wardrop (Motherwell ASC, Scotland) 19:02 (2nd)
- 1950 J.P.D. "Jack" Cassidy (Clontarf SC) 24:40 (16th)
- 1951 Eric W. Briggs (Pembroke SC) 24:35 (5th)
- 1952 Eric W. Briggs (Pembroke SC) 23:07
- 1953 Cecil Young (Wellington SC, Belfast) 22:00 (20th)
- 1954 Paddy Arrigan (Curragh) 22:00 (2nd)
- 1955 Freddy Parkes (Wellington SC, Belfast) 24:36 (3rd)
- 1956 Freddy Parkes (Wellington SC, Belfast) 24:05 (11th)
- 1957 Gerard F. Callanan (Pembroke SC) 25:01 (5th)
- 1958 Robin Power (Sunday's Well, Cork) 25:27 (1st), tied
  Gerard F. Callanan (Pembroke SC) 25:27, tied
- 1959 Robin Power (Sunday's Well, Cork) 22:52 (2nd)
- 1960 Rory O'Connor (Club Snámha Columcille) 22:27
- 1961 Owen Corrigan (Club Snámha Columcille) 22:35 (6th)
- 1962 Nicholas Smith (Dublin SC) 21:29 (4th)
- 1963 Donnacha O'Dea (Club Snámha Columcille) 20:35 (16th)
- 1964 Owen Corrigan (Club Snámha Columcille) 21:49 (6th)
- 1965 Donnacha O'Dea (Club Snámha Columcille) 20:00
- 1966 Francis "Chalkey" White (Guinness SC) 22:02 (1st)
- 1967 Francis "Chalkey" White (Guinness SC) 21:44 (1st)
- 1968 Francis "Chalkey" White (Guinness SC) 19:52 (11th)
- 1969 Francis "Chalkey" White (Guinness SC) 21:31 (9th)
- 1970 Francis "Chalkey" White (Guinness SC) 20:20 (5th)
- 1971 Francis "Chalkey" White (Guinness SC) 19:25 (14th)
- 1972 Liam Bohane (Half Moon SC) 20:00 (3rd)
- 1973 Francis "Chalkey" White (Guinness SC & Villanova) 18:02
- 1974 Francis "Chalkey" White (Guinness SC) 19:24 (13th)
- 1975 Lorcan Shelley (Terenure SC) 21:18 (4th)
- 1976 David Cummins (Cormorant SC) 21:32
- 1977 David Cummins (Cormorant SC) 16:32†
- 1978 David Cummins (Cormorant SC) 13:20†
- 1979 †
- 1980 Francis "Chalkey" White (Guinness SC) 18:44 (13th)
- 1981 W. Kehoe (Sandycove SC) 22:26
- 1982 Aidan Towey (Terenure SC) 18:22
- 1983 Tadgh Murphy (Half Moon SC) 19:02
- 1984 Tadgh Murphy (Half Moon SC) 22:00
- 1985 Jason Stynes (Kingdom SC, Kerry) 19:10
- 1986 Aidan Towey (Terenure SC) 16:32
- 1987 Shane Moraghan (Glenalbyn) 20:20 (3rd)
- 1988 Shane Moraghan (Glenalbyn) 17:06
- 1989 Mark Water (Triton SC) 21:40 (21st)
- 1990 Shane Moraghan (Glenalbyn) 18:26
- 1991 Ken Turner (Glenalbyn SC) 20:25 (3rd)
- 1992 Ken Turner (CRC SC) 18:27
- 1993 Stephen Saunders (Terenure College SC) 18:29
- 1994 Stephen Saunders (Terenure College SC) 17:48
- 1995 Stephen Saunders (Trojan SC) 21:21
- 1996 Stephen Saunders (Trojan SC) 20:50
- 1997 Stephen Saunders (Trojan SC) 17:10
- 1998 Eoin Fahy (Half Moon SC) 21:45 (6th)
- 1999 D. Farrell (Sandycove SC) 21:47
- 2000 Kevin Williamson (Terenure College SC) 23:29 [age 41]
- 2001 David Turner (St. Vincent's)
- 2002 Eoin Fahy (Guinness SC)
- 2003 John Morton (Wicklow SC) (1st)
- 2004
- 2005 Kevin Stacey (Coolmine SC) 24:06 (45th)
- 2006 Kevin Stacey (Coolmine SC) 27:24 (1st)
- 2007 Shane Drumm (ESB SC) 20:16 (5th)
- 2008 Adam Carroll (ESB SC) 16:28 (41st)
- 2009 Daire O'Driscoll (Templeogue SC) 22:42 (14th)
- 2010 Séamus Stacey (NUI Maynooth SC) 19:29 (12th)
- 2011 Conor Turner (Aer Lingus SC) 28:20 (35th)
- 2012 Conor Turner (Aer Lingus SC) 16:07 (139th)♦
- 2013 Donncha Ó Siadhail (NUI Maynooth SC) 21:02 (55th)♦
- 2014 Conor Turner (Aer Lingus SC) 29:43 (2nd)¶
- 2015 Conor Turner (North Dublin SC) 29:57 (3rd)
- 2016 Conor Turner (North Dublin SC) 24:06 (152nd)
- 2017 Nathan Turner (Aer Lingus SC) 26:01 (90th)
- 2018 Donncha Ó Siadhail (Meath Masters) 28:17 (2nd)
- 2019 Donncha Ó Siadhail (Meath Masters) 31:34 (42nd)
- 2020 Not held due to COVID-19 pandemic
- 2021 Donncha Ó Siadhail (Meath Masters) 19:00 (180th)∞
- 2022 David McPhillips (Glenalbyn Masters) 21:28 (232nd)°
- 2023 Ben Moran (Aer Lingus) 21.38 (131st)
- 2024 Simon Murray (Guinness SC) 33:42 (1st)
- 2025 Adam Foley (Limerick SC) 24:29 (47th)

§ He appeared as "J. Pembroke" in the results; ‡ Scratch races; # Handicapped race from Bull Wall to Clontarf Baths; † Race swum at Islandbridge Memorial Park finishing at Dublin University Boat House, Islandbridge; ♦ Butt Bridge to East Link Bridge at the 3Arena; ¶ Rory O'Moore Bridge (Watling Street) to Custom House Quay under Rosie Hackett Bridge for first time; ∞Upstream from 3Arena to Customs House, about 1600m °https://my1.raceresult.com/220232/RRPublish/data/pdf?name=Result%20Lists%7CFull%20Results&contest=2&lang=en

=== Liffey Swim - Fastest Women ===
- 1920-1976 Not held
- 1977 Caroline Green (King's Hospital SC) 6:13†
- 1978 Ann Cummins (Cormorant SC) 4:19, tied‡
  Caroline Green (King's Hospital) 4:19, tied‡
- 1979 §
- 1980 Ann Cummins (Cormorant SC) 5:05
- 1981 Mairéad Doran (Dublin SC) 7:19
- 1982 Louise Keogh (Dublin SC) NT
- 1983 Janne Murphy (E.S.B. SC) 10:45
- 1984 Louise Keogh (Dublin SC) 6:14
- 1985 Siobhán Hoare (King's Hospital SC) 3:39
- 1986 Mandi Kavanagh (Otter SC) 5:50
- 1987 Siobhán Hoare (King's Hospital SC) 10:21#
- 1988 Brenda Howard (Dundrum SC) 19:23♣
- 1989 Ciara Byrne (Trojan SC) 17:30♣
- 1990 Ciara Byrne (Trojan SC) 19:23♣
- 1991 Linda Clarke (Glenalbyn SC) 25:11♥
- 1992 L. Campbell (King's Hospital SC) 19:22
- 1993
- 1994 Dawn McGlynn (Portmarnock SC) 18:43
- 1995
- 1996 Heidi Kinsella (Glenalbyn SC) 24:08
- 1997 Edel Mulholland (Glenalbyn SC) 20:11
- 1998 Rachel Lee (Eastern Bay SC) 23:09
- 1999
- 2000 Rachel Lee (Guinness SC) 20:33
- 2001 Yvonne Emerson (Cormorant SC)
- 2002
- 2003
- 2004
- 2005 Rachel Lee (Guinness SC) 23:00 (10th)
- 2006 Suzanna Murphy (Trojan SC) 23:28 (8th)
- 2007 Gillian Gavaghan (ESB SC) 21:26 (36th)
- 2008 Julie Ann Galloway (NAC Masters) 14:50 (77th)
- 2009 Rachel Lee (Guinness SC) 24:13 (15th)
- 2010 Suzanne Murphy (Glenalbyn Masters SC) 20:39 (102nd)
- 2011 Sinead Tyrrell (Garda SC) 26:58 (3rd)
- 2012 Sinead Tyrrell (Garda SC) 17:16 (94th)♦
- 2013 Danika Sugrue (Aer Lingus SC) 21:49 (73rd)♦
- 2014 Rachel Lee (Guinness SC) 30:15(1st)¶
- 2015 Ciara Doran (Limerick SC) 28:38 (3rd)
- 2016 Ciara Doran (City of Derry SC) 23:01 (145th)
- 2017 Ciara Doran (City of Derry SC) 22:37 (117th)
- 2018 Ciara Doran (Dublin SC) 27:09 (3rd)
- 2019 Courtney McDermott (Glenalbyn Masters) 28:47 (19th)
- 2020 Not held due to COVID-19 restrictions
- 2021 Hazel Bentley (Wicklow SC) 19:20∞ (80th)
- 2022 Charlotte Reid (Aer Lingus SC) 28:22 (78th)
- 2023 Jessica Purcell (Aer Lingus SC) 24:57 (6th)
- 2024 Jessica Purcell (Aer Lingus SC) 36:15 (12th)
- 2025 Jessica Purcell (Aer Lingus SC) 25:11 (86th)

† 500 yards race at Islandbridge Memorial Park finishing at Dublin University Boat House; ‡ 500 metres race at Islandbridge Memorial Park finishing at Dublin University Boat House; § 600 metres race at Islandbridge Memorial Park finishing at Dublin University Boat House, Islandbridge; ♦ Butt Bridge to East Link Bridge at the 3Arena; ¶ Rory O'Moore Bridge (Watling Street) to Custom House Quay under Rosie Hackett Bridge for first time; #1000 yards course at Islandbridge Memorial Park; ♣one mile course at Islandbridge Memorial Park; ♥First Liffey Swim for women on the classic Liffey Quays under the bridges course; ∞Upstream from 3Arena to Customs House, about 1600m

== Trivia ==
- The winner of the Liffey Swim in 1920, J.J. “Jack” Kennedy, was the grandson of Alderman John O’Connor, Lord Mayor of Dublin in 1885.
- Liffey Swim with the smallest number of starters/finishers - 20th edition in 1939 - 15 started/12 finished - held over 1¾-mile (2.8 km) course from Bull Wall to Clontarf Baths
- Liffey Swim with the highest number of men finishing - 100th edition in 2019 - 364 finishers
- Liffey Swim with the highest number of women finishing - 100th edition in 2019 - 252 finishers
- First double winner of the Liffey Swim on the classic course in the River Liffey - Chalkie White (Guinness SC) on 10 August 1966 and 14 August 1967
- Youngest ever male winner of the Liffey Swim - Francis "Chalkey" White (Guinness SC) in 1966 at age 11
- Youngest ever female winner of the Liffey Swim - Mairéad Doran (Dublin SC) on 11 September 1979 at age 10 on Islandbridge course
- Oldest male swimmer to place in the top three finishers - Jackie Kearney (Dublin SC), 2nd in 2004, aged 73
- Brothers who have won the Liffey Swim - William F. "Billy" Case (1930) and Richard N. "Ritchie" Case (1934, 1936, 1937, 1938) - Clontarf SC; Cyril Hardy (1957) and Anthony "Tony" Hardy (1960) - Crusade Aquatic Club; Colm O'Brien (1963) - Half Moon SC and Bert O'Brien (1988,1995) - Sandycove SC; Fintan O'Meara (1972) and Nicholas O'Meara (1977) - Clontarf SC; Greg O'Dwyer (1986) and Brian O'Dwyer (2010) - Guinness SC; Pat O'Driscoll (2009) - Templeogue SC and Ciarán O'Driscoll (2013) - Half Moon SC Michael Mongey St. Vincents WPC 1997 and Brian Mongey Millennium SC 2000
- In 1980 three brothers finished in the top ten finishers - Michael O'Meara (4th), Nicholas O'Meara (6th) and Vinny O'Meara (9th), all members of Clontarf SC
- First winner of Liffey Swim from Cork - Andrew Crosbie (Sunday's Well SC, Cork) in 1935, under scratch conditions
- First Winner of the Liffey Swim from Limerick - Joe Grant (Shannon SC) in 1950
- First Winner of the Liffey Swim from Galway - Patrick "Pat" Broderick (Galway SC) in 1955
- Lowest men's winning team score - 1941 North Dublin WSC (1,2,3,4) 10pts - T. Hannigan, S. Thomas, J. Fagan and J. Colgan
- In 1967 William F. Case, winner in 1930, now Detective Garda Case, was awarded the Walter Scott Medal for Valor for rescuing a man and a boy at Barley Cove, West Cork against a strong current, an act of exceptional bravery and heroism involving risk to his own life.
- Liffey Swim-Winner Olympians - Thomas "Hayes" Dockrell (1922), 1928 Amsterdam - Water Polo; Charles "Cecil" Fagan (1923), 1924 Paris - Water Polo; David Cummins (1975), 1980 Moscow - 100 m Butterfly, 200 m Butterfly, 200 m Backstroke.
- Liffey Swim-Fastest Swimmer Olympians - Donnacha O'Dea (1963, 1965), 1968 Mexico City - 100 m Freestyle, 100 m Butterfly, 200 m Individual Medley; David Cummins (1976, 1977, 1978), 1980 Moscow - 100 m Butterfly, 200 m Butterfly, 200 m Backstroke; Kevin Williamson (2000), 1976 Montreal - 200 m Freestyle, 400 m Freestyle, 1500 m Freestyle, 1980 Moscow - 200 m Freestyle, 400 m Freestyle
- John Cyril Hopkins, Winner of the 2nd Liffey Swim in 1921, became a Sergeant Pilot 17th Fighter Squadron R.A.F.; he was killed on 4 December 1933 as a result of a mid-air-collision flying accident between two Bristol Bulldog aircraft at Milton Lilbourne, Wiltshire, England
- Gerry Boland, Liffey Swim winner in 1953, collapsed and died on 3 July 1977, after rescuing his North Dublin SC friend and veteran of 26 Liffey Swims, Jim Kavanagh, from the sea of Clontarf where he had suffered a heart attack during the Leddy Cup 800m open sea race and also died
- The Liffey Swim in 1978, held at Islandbridge, is unique in the annals of race in that the first three places in each of the men's and women's races were from the same swimming club - Men: Half Moon SC - 1st Jim Mooney, 2nd Dermot Hughes, 3rd Briam McLoughlin; Women: Guinness SC - 1st Yvonne Smith, 2nd Adrienne O'Rourke, 3rd Joyce Palmer
- Highest number of Liffey Swim wins by a man - 4 - Richard N. "Ritchie" Case (1934,1936,1937,1938), all under scratch conditions
- Highest number of Liffey Swim wins by a woman - as at 2019 no woman has won the race twice
- Highest number of members of one family to complete the Liffey Swim together - 95th Liffey swim in 2014 - Brian Murphy (at "Go", 184th, 55:07) and his four sons, Aidan Murphy (at 8 min, 15th, 36:48). Stephen Murphy (at 6 min 45 sec, 46th, 40:07), Colm Murphy (at 2 min 45 sec, 125th, 47:55) and Martin Murphy (at 2 min 30 sec, 186th, 52:04), all members of Sandycove SC
- Double winners of the Liffey Swim under handicap - Francis "Chalkey" White (1966, 1967), Arthur "Art" Dunne (1981, 1982), Bert O'Brien (1988,1995)
- Youngest Male Swimmer to place in top 3 - Ciarán O'Driscoll (Dublin SC) aged 10 – 2nd by 2 yards in the 56th Liffey Swim in 1975
- Longest gap between being Runner-up in and Winner of the Liffey Swim - 38 years - Ciarán O'Driscoll (runner-up 1975, winner 2013)
- In 1981 two Brothers, Arthur "Art" Dunne (15-years-old) and Gerry Dunne (23-years-old), fought out a stroke-for-stroke duel over the final yards of the Liffey Swim to the finishing boom; Art Dunne was adjudged the winner by a touch
- Most Liffey Swims swum by a male competitor - Jackie Kearney (Dublin SC) and Paul Emmett (Half Moon) - exact numbers differ in various sources
- Most Liffey Swims swum by a female competitor - Sandra Trappe (Dublin SC) - all the women's races from 1991 to 2018 except 2007 - Winner in 2003
- Longest run of winners from same club - 6 - Half Moon SC (1978–1983) - Jimmy Mooney, Dermot Hughes, Michael Fitzpatrick, Arthur Dunne (twice), Paul Kealy
- Earliest date in the year that the race has been swum - 24th Liffey Swim - 25 June 1943
- Latest date in the year that the race has been swum - 101st Liffey Swim - 23 October 2021 [previous latest date - 96th Liffey Swim - 19 September 2015]
- Brother and Sister Winners of the Liffey Swim - David Cummins (Cormorant SC) 1975 and Ann Cummins (Cormorant SC) 1977 (her brother was the fastest swimmer in 1977)
- Husband and Wife Liffey Swim Winners - Ciarán O'Driscoll (2013) - Half Moon SC and Siobhán Hoare (1988, 1991) - Half Moon SC; Donncha Ó Siadhail (2015) - Swim4Life SC and Jennifer Gilbert (2016) - Swim4Life SC
- Male winners of the Liffey Swim who also placed 2nd - John Cyril Hopkins (winner 1921, runner-up 1922); Thomas Hayes Dockrell (winner 1922, runner-up 1923); Richard N. Case (winner 1934,1936,1937,1938, runner-up 1939); Jimmy Rafter (winner 1946, runner-up 1944); Patrick G. Condon (winner 1944, runner-up 1947); Michael Fitzpatrick (winner 1980, runner-up 1972,1974); Bert O'Brien (winner 1988,1995, runner-up 1967), Ciarán O'Driscoll (winner 2013, runner-up 1975), Donncha Ó Siadhail (winner 2014, runner-up 2018)
- Longest gap between Liffey Swim Wins - 7 years - Bert O'Brien (1988, 1995)
- Two sets of brothers finished in the top ten placings in the 62nd Liffey Swim in 1981 - The Dunne brothers, Art and Gerry, 1st and 2nd, respectively, and the O'Dea brothers, Paul and Joe, 7th and 10th, respectively
- Greatest number of fastest times in Liffey Swim - 9 - Francis "Chalkey" White (1966–1971,1973,1974,1980); he missed the Liffey Swim in 1972 while representing Ireland at an international meeting in Belgium and attempting to qualify for the Olympic Games in Munich
- Longest sequence of fastest swims - 6 - Francis "Chalkey" White (1966–1971)
- Thomas A. "Tommy" O'Reilly, Winner of Liffey Swim in 1926, became President of the I.R.F.U. in 1963–64
- Paul Kealy, the winner in 1983, was the first cousin of the double Liffey Swim winner in 1981 and 1982, Arthur 'Art' Dunne
- Jason Stynes (Kingdom SC, Tralee), the winner in 1984, was the nephew of winners Colm O'Brien (1963, Half Moon SC) and Bert O'Brien (1988, 1995, Sandycove SC)
- Father and son winner and fastest swimmer in same year - 2009: Pat O'Driscoll winner and Daire O'Driscoll fastest swim, nephew of Ciarán O'Driscoll, 2013 winner
- Liffey Swim winners in the fastest times under handicap - 1932: Leo Maher (Republican SC); 1946: Jimmy Rafter (Half Moon SC); 1958: Robin Power (Sunday's Well SC, Cork); 1966: Francis 'Chalkey' White (Guinness SC); 1967: Francis 'Chalkey' White (Guinness SC); 2003: John Morton (Wicklow SC); 2006: Kevin Stacey (Coolmine SC)
- Butch Moore (North Dublin SC), a competitor in the 1955 Liffey Swim, achieved celebrity status in 1965 as Ireland's first contestant in the Eurovision Song Contest in Naples singing Walking in Streets in the Rain; Ireland placed 6th of 18 entrants
- Rachel Lee, the 2014 winner and fastest swimmer off scratch, had previously achieved the fastest Liffey swim by a woman on at least four occasions
- Father and son winners of the Liffey Swim - Derek "Bimbo" Wilkes 1989 and Gerard Wilkes 2014 of North Dublin SC
- Ken Turner, fastest time in 1991 and 1992, and David Turner, fastest time in 2001, are brothers
- Nathan Fullam-Turner, the winner of the 2017 fastest time, is a nephew of both Ken and David Turner, and is the younger cousin of Conor Turner, son of David Turner and five times winner of the fastest time prize in 2011, 2012, 2014, 2015 and 2016
- Niall O'Sullivan, Dublin SC won the first prize for first outside the winners prizes for going under the new Rosie O'Hackett Bridge when the prize was first introduced in 2014.
- Patrick Sheehan (Sheehan) (Garda SC), who finished in the Liffey Swim in 1932, is the father of John Sheahan, Irish musician and composer and the last surviving member of The Dubliners
- 2017: First time the male and female winners came from the same swimming club, Dublin SC - Colin Monaghan and Ann Marie Bourke
- Longest gap between 1st and second place: 2 minutes 13 seconds, Ciaran O'Driscoll (2013) over a shorter than normal course.
- Mark Hanley, aged 15, winner of the 100th Liffey Swim, is the youngest winner since Jason Stynes (Kingdom SC, Tralee), aged 14, won the 65th Liffey Swim in 1984
- Sinead Delaney, the 2019 winner, and her mother Joan Delaney (9th scoring place) were the first two members of the Phoenix SC winning team to finish
- In the 11th Liffey Swim in 1930, William F. Case (Clontarf SC), an 18-year-old, won the race using only backstroke from start to finish
- In the 100th Liffey Swim in 2019, Ceall Ó Dunlaing (Dublin SC) became the first ever swimmer to complete the course using only the energy-sapping butterfly stroke
- In the 101st Liffey Swim in 2021, Claire O'Dwyer (Dublin SC) who placed 2nd became the oldest female swimmer at age 79 to place in the top three finishers
- In 2021 Pat O'Driscoll (Templeogue SC), the winner in 2009, received recognition for completing his 50th Liffey Swim, joining a small band of swimmers to have achieved this landmark
- The 101st Liffey Swim was swum upstream for the first time in the race's history from the 3-Arena to the Customs House
- The 2022 event marked the 50th Liffey Swim completed by Pat O'Driscoll and Derek Wilkes
- Ronan Dalton, the 2023 winner, did so at his 42nd attempt in one of the closest finishes ever by 1 sec.
- In 2023 Ceall Ó Dunlaing (Dublin SC) became the first person to have completed an individual medley of Liffey Swims on the traditional course: 2019 Butterfly, 2022 Backstroke, 2023 Breastroke, 2012-2021 Freestyle on 7 occasions
- 2024 marked the 100th anniversary of Jack B. Yeats winning the Olympic Silver medal in the Art Section of the 1924 Olympic Games in Paris for his painting "The Liffey Swim"; to mark this anniversary a replica of the 1924 Olympic medal was presented to all finishers of the 2024 Liffey Swim
