= Chalky =

Chalky or Chalkie may refer to:

== Nickname ==
- "Chalky", nickname of Charles Clinton Fleek (1947–1969), United States Army sergeant and recipient of the Medal of Honor
- Chalkie or Chalkdust, nickname of Hollis Liverpool (born 1940), Trinidadian calypsonian and scholar
- Chalkie White (disambiguation), a list of people and fictional characters nicknamed "Chalkie White" or "Chalky White"
- Chalky Wright (1912–1957), American world champion boxer

== Places ==
- Chalkie's Beach, Queensland, Australia
- Taiari / Chalky Inlet, a fjord on New Zealand's South Island
- Chalky Island (New Zealand)
- Chalky Island (Tasmania), Australia
- Chalky Mount, Barbados, a range of hills
- Little Chalky Island, Tasmania, Australia

== Other uses ==
- Chalky (dog), TV chef Rick Stein's Jack Russell Terrier
- Chalky (comics), a British comic and the title character, created in 1971
- Chalkie, a tyrannical teacher character created by cartoonist Carl Giles
