= Mellows Bridge =

Bridge over the River Liffey in Dublin, Ireland

Mellows Bridge Droichead Uí Mhaoilíosa
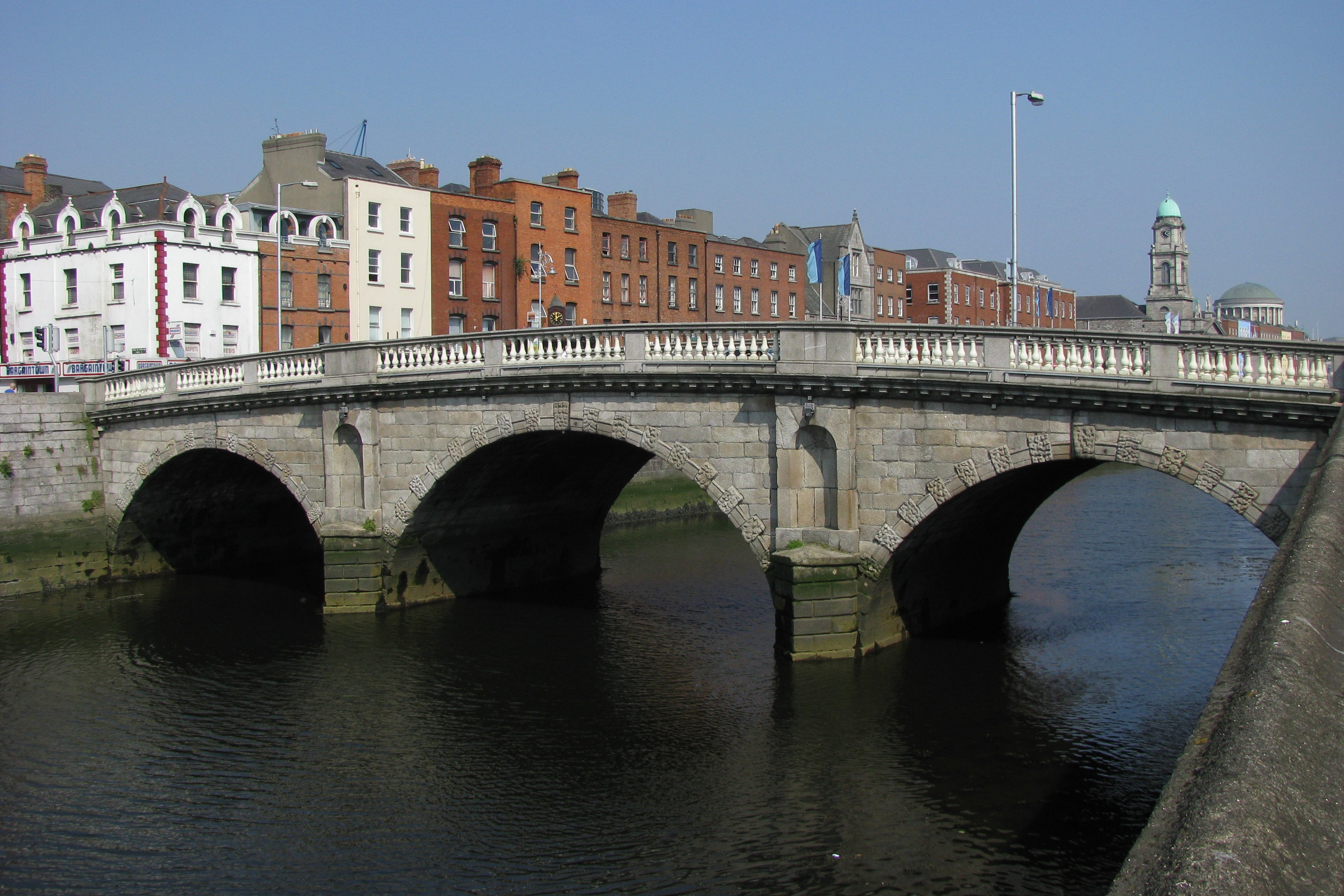
- Coordinates: 53.3464°N 6.2805°W
- Crosses: River Liffey
- Locale: Dublin, Ireland
- Other name: Mellowes Bridge
- Preceded by: James Joyce Bridge
- Followed by: Father Mathew Bridge

Characteristics
- Design: Elliptical arch stone bridge
- Material: Granite
- Total length: 43m
- Width: 10.2m
- No. of spans: 3

History
- Designer: Charles Vallancey (1764-68)
- Construction end: 1768
- Opened: First built 1684 - Arran Bridge; Rebuilt 1764 - Queen's Bridge; Renamed 1923 - Queen Maeve Bridge; Renamed 1942 - Mellows Bridge

Location
- Interactive map of Mellows Bridge

Mellows Bridge (Irish: Droichead Uí Mhaoilíosa) is a road bridge spanning the River Liffey, in Dublin, Ireland and joining Queen Street and Arran Quay to the south quays and Bridgefoot Street.

== History ==
=== Arran Bridge ===
In 1683, a stone bridge called Arran Bridge or Arons Bridge was built in a location between the upstream Bloody Bridge (now Rory O'More Bridge) and the downstream Bridge of Dublin (now Father Mathew Bridge). Construction was funded by landowner William Ellis, and Dublin Corporation. It was named after Richard Butler, 1st Earl of Arran, second son of James Butler, 1st Duke of Ormond. From a drawing made by Francis Place in 1699, it appears to have been a four-span stone arched bridge.

It was also known as Bridewell Bridge due to its proximity to the Smithfield Bridewell, and as Ellis's Bridge because of its association with Sir William and Sir John Ellis.

This structure stood for 80 years, but was swept away by a flood in 1763. The collapse was described by George Semple as being an unlucky accident when a raft of timber was swiftly carried downstream in a flood where it got lodged across the middle arch. The water flow increased under the raft at this point, and since the piers of the bridge were built on top of the river bed, "This raft of timber obstructing the current of the surface, in like manner increased the power of it at the bottom and within the space of a few hours totally demolished the bridge."

=== Queen's Bridge ===
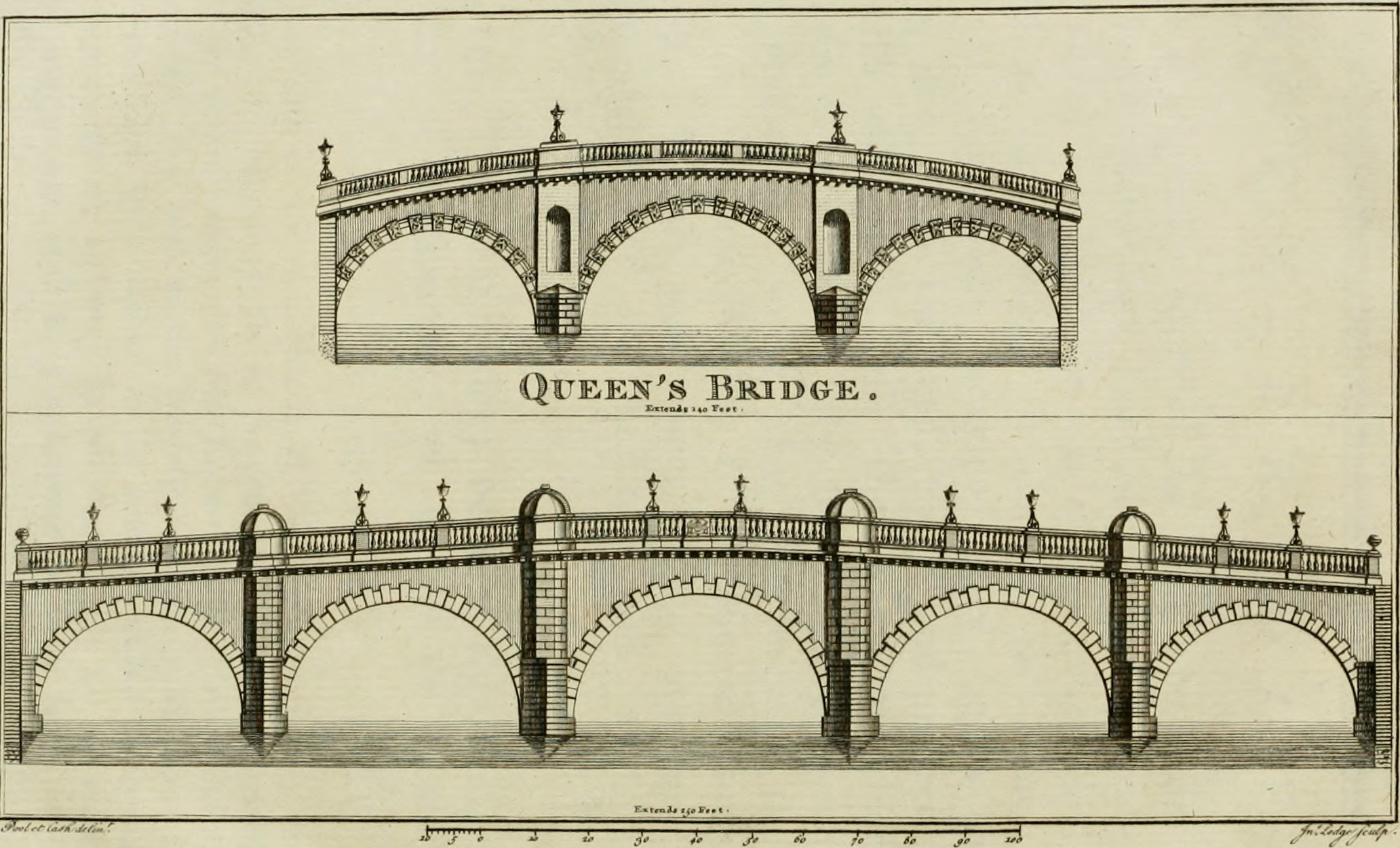
Illustration of the bridge (top) from circa 1780.

Designed by Charles Vallancey, a military engineer, a replacement bridge on the same site was built between 1764 and 1768 as a three elliptical arch stone bridge with a total span of 42 m, and named Queens Bridge after Charlotte of Mecklenburg, queen consort of George III.

=== Queen Maeve Bridge ===
The bridge was renamed for the legendary Queen Maeve at a meeting of the Municipal Council on 2 January 1922.

=== Liam Mellows Bridge ===
It was renamed again in 1942 to its current name, after Lieutenant General Liam Mellows Irish Republican army who was executed during the Irish Civil War.

Being 250 years old, Mellows Bridge remains the oldest of all Dublin city bridges still in use, although the parapets were replaced with cast iron balustrades and stone copings between 1816 and 1818.

== Nomenclature ==
As with other bridges on the Liffey in Dublin, and chiefly due to the many name changes, Mellows Bridge is known locally by several names, including: Queen's Bridge, Queen's Street Bridge, Queen Maeve Bridge, and Mellowes Bridge (with an "e").

National Graves Association plaque (in Irish and English) noting renaming of bridge
