= Frank Sherwin Bridge =

Bridge over the River Liffey in Ireland

Frank Sherwin Bridge Droichead Phroinsias Uí Shearbháin
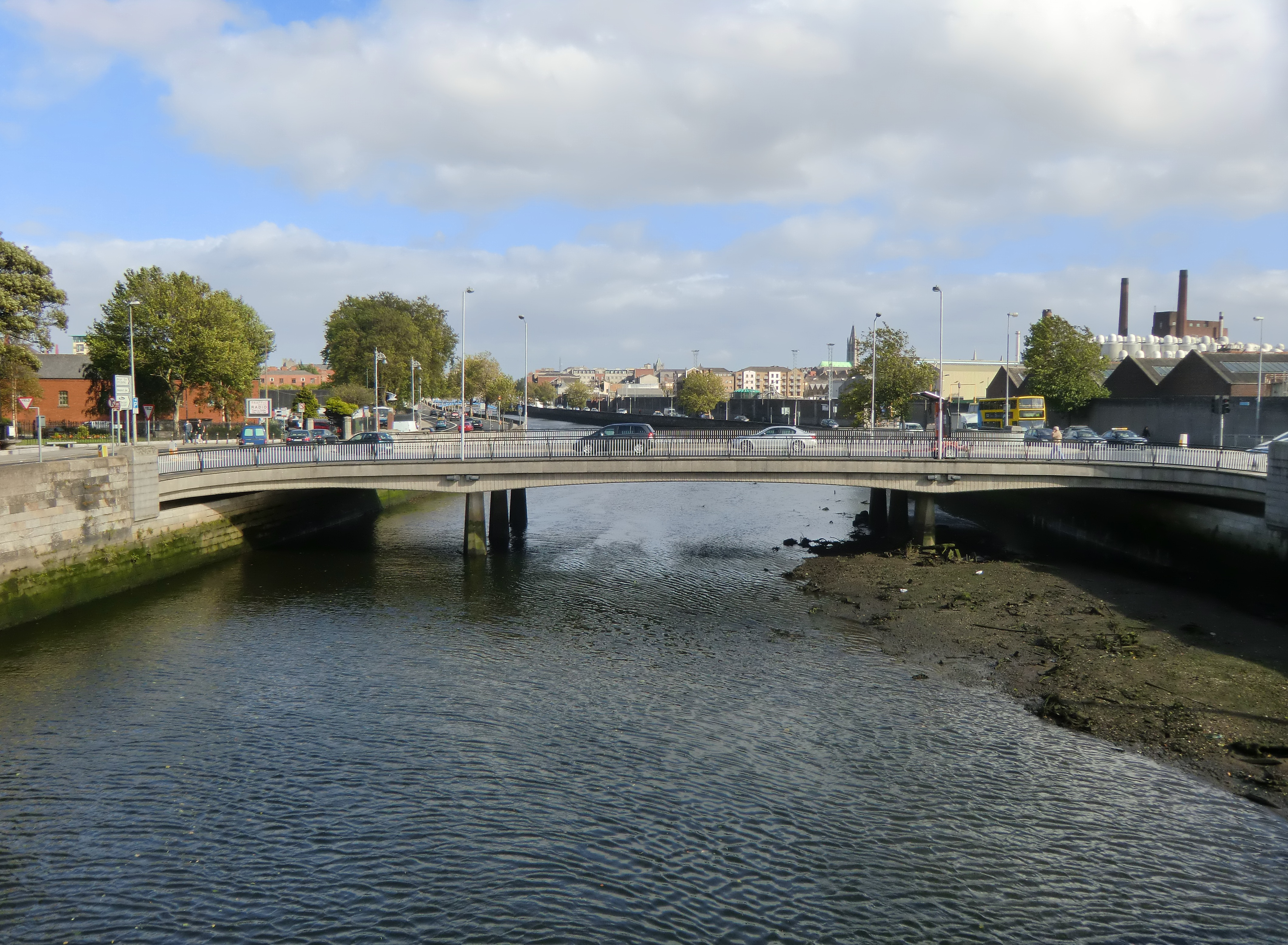
- View of Frank Sherwin Bridge from Seán Heuston Bridge
- Coordinates: 53.3472°N 6.2910°W
- Crosses: River Liffey
- Locale: Dublin, Ireland
- Preceded by: Seán Heuston Bridge
- Followed by: Rory O'More Bridge

Characteristics
- Design: Girder bridge (concrete)
- Material: Reinforced concrete
- Total length: 50m
- Width: 19.7m
- No. of spans: 3

History
- Designer: Dublin Corporation (Road Design Division)
- Constructed by: Irishenco Ltd
- Construction cost: IR£1,500,000, (or IR£1.8million)
- Opened: 28 August 1982 (44 years ago)

Location
- Interactive map of Frank Sherwin Bridge

Frank Sherwin Bridge (Irish: Droichead Phroinsias Uí Shearbháin) is a one-way road bridge spanning the River Liffey in Dublin, Ireland. It joins Victoria Quay on the southside to Wolfe Tone Quay and Parkgate Street on the northside.

== History ==
=== Design and development ===
Designed within Dublin Corporation's "Road Design Division", the bridge is a three-span reinforced concrete structure. It has been described as "utilitarian" in style.

It was built to remove traffic from the much older and narrower Sean Heuston Bridge as part of an extended traffic management project on Dublin's quays. This resulted in reversing the direction of the one-way system on the quays to north quays eastbound/south quays westbound. Prior to the bridge's opening, the south quays carried all eastbound traffic. Traffic coming eastbound from Parkgate Street ran via Benburb Street and Mellowes Bridge. Westbound traffic heading towards St. John's Road West would cross from the north quays via Rory O'Moore Bridge onto Victoria Quay, which had two-way traffic until the Sherwin Bridge opened. Sean Heuston Bridge had weight restrictions that prohibited truck and bus traffic.

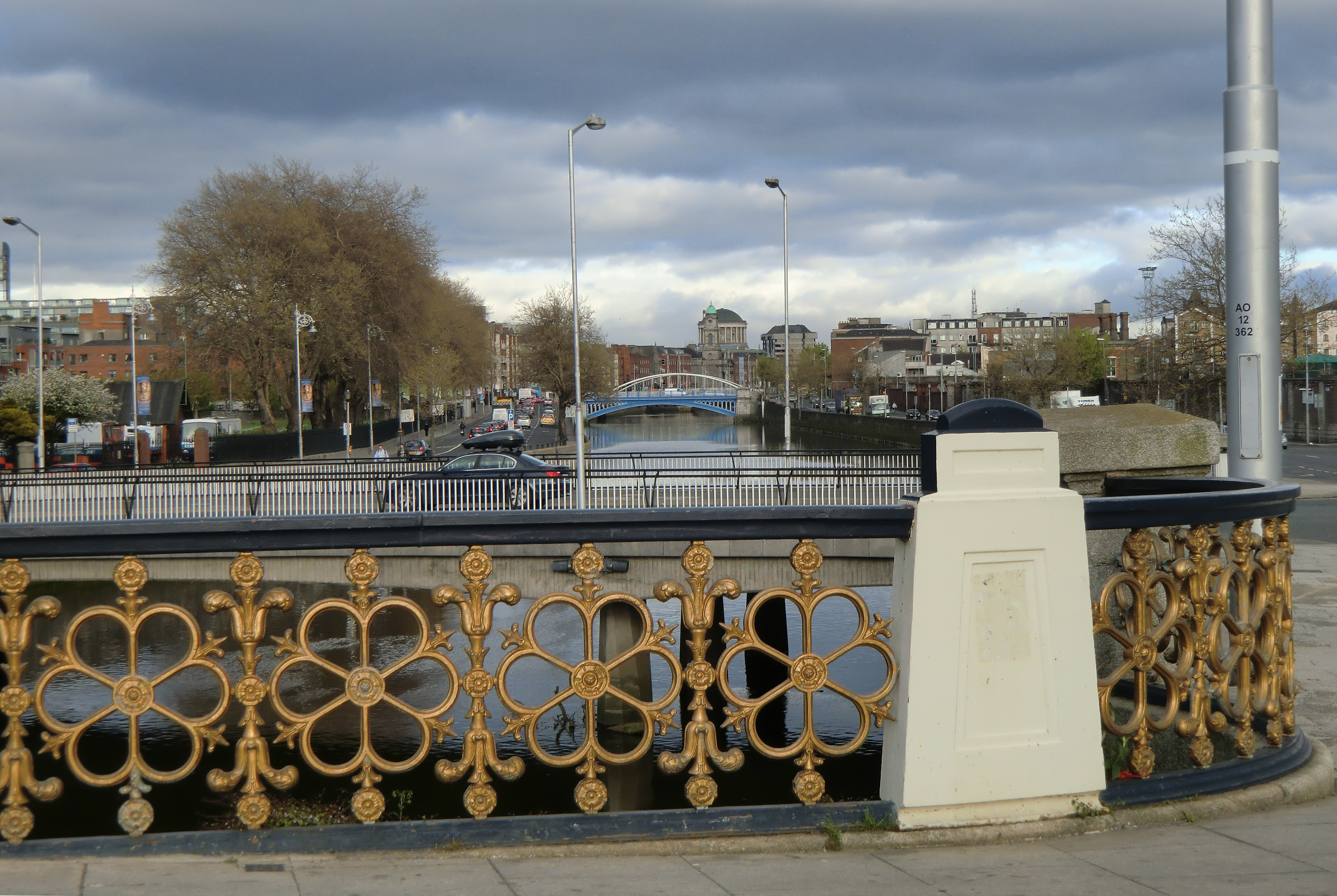
View of Frank Sherwin Bridge (white rails) from Seán Heuston Bridge (gold rails). In the distance are Rory O'More Bridge (blue) and James Joyce Bridge (white)

=== Opening ===
The bridge, which was named for Dublin politician Frank Sherwin (1905–1981), was opened on Saturday, 28 August 1982. After leading the opening ceremony, the Lord Mayor of Dublin Dan Browne drove his car across the bridge. The Irish Times noted that the bridge was a "vital part of the major new traffic scheme devised by Dublin Corporation for the inner city" which involved the reversing of the traffic flows along both sides of the quays. Browne told the newspaper that it was he who had proposed to Dublin City Council that the bridge be named after Frank Sherwin, adding:

Mr Sherwin had given long service as a public representative on the council and his ceaseless concern for the people he represented, particularly in relation to housing, was worthy of remembrance in this way. Frank Sherwin, the Lord Mayor said, was "a most colourful character, a typical product of Dublin's inner city and he fully deserves to have his memory engraved on this new Dublin landmark."

The paper also noted that the Corporation intended on developing the "attractive memorial plot" at the northern end of the bridge, which was later opened as Croppies Memorial Park. Pat Liddy notes that during construction, the half-acre park, then known as the Crimean Trophy Plot, was used as a site depot, which left it "requiring substantial renewal" after the bridge was completed.

The bridge was awarded the Irish Concrete Society Award in 1982, according to the "high quality of workmanship".

=== Victoria Quay widening ===
On 21 March 1984, Dublin Corporation confirmed that it had handed over the ownership of three public roads south of James's Street (Portland Street West, Rainfort Street (between the Robert Street and Crane Street junctions) and Robert Street (between the Portland Street West and Bond Street junctions)) to the Guinness Brewery in return for a site the Corporation required for road widening at Victoria Quay, near the Frank Sherwin Bridge. According to a Corporation spokesperson, it was felt that the "construction of proper approach roads to the new Frank Sherwin Bridge would be of greater benefit to the public generally than keeping open the three roads in question", which had been used almost exclusively by employees and customers of the brewery.
