= Charles Vallancey =

British Army officer and surveyor (1731–1812)

General Charles Vallancey FRS
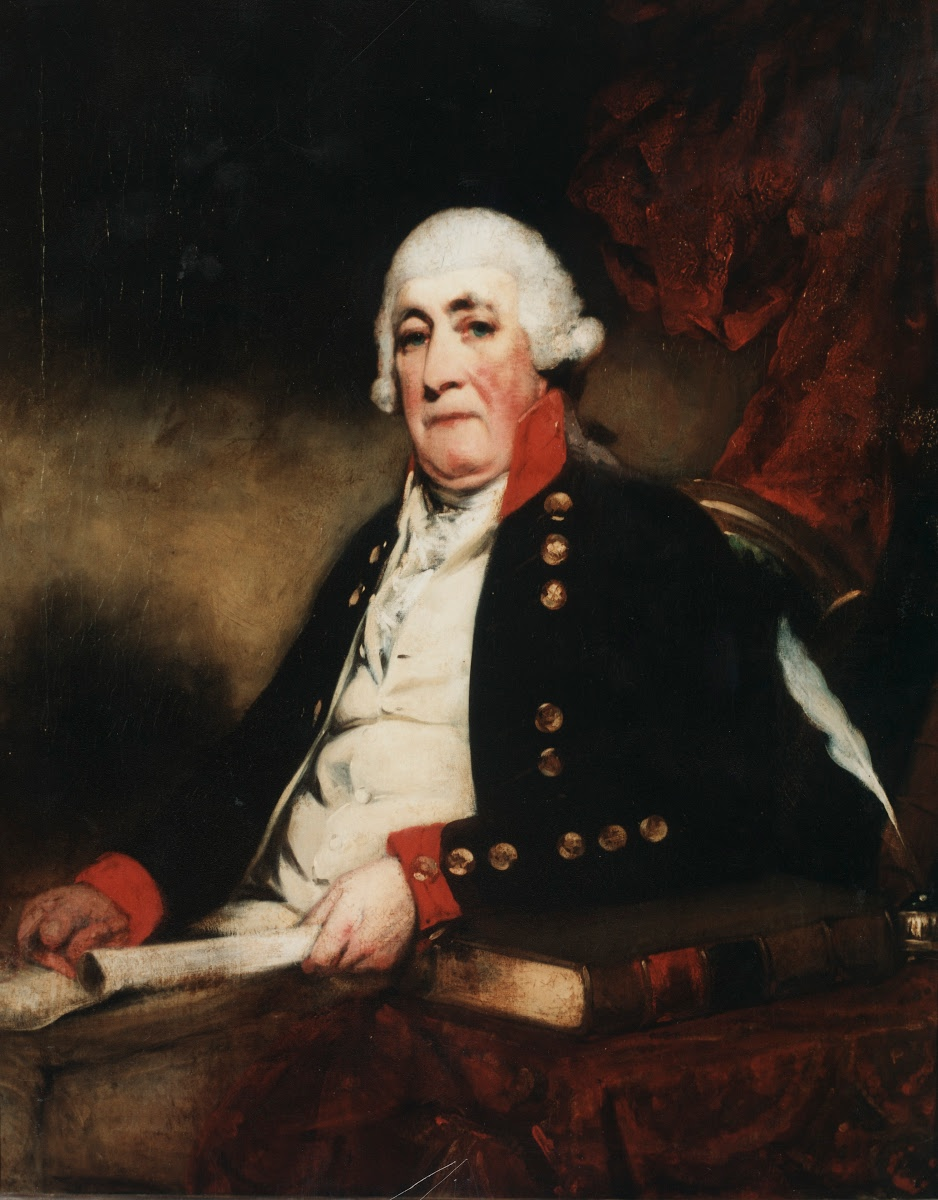
- Portrait attributed to Solomon Williams
- Born: Charles Vallancé; 6 April 1731; Westminster, London
- Died: 6 April 1731 (aged 0)
- Military career
- Allegiance: Great Britain; United Kingdom
- Branch: British Army
- Service years: 1747–1812
- Rank: General
- Units: 10th Regiment of Foot; Royal Engineers

General Charles Vallancey FRS (born Charles Vallancé; 6 April 1731 – 8 August 1812) was a British Army officer and surveyor who was sent to Ireland. He remained there and became an authority on Irish antiquities. Some of his theories would be rejected today, but his drawings, for example, were painstakingly accurate compared to existent artefacts. Other drawings, such as his diagram of the banquet hall at Tara, and the lost crown of the High King of Ireland, are unverifiable, as the manuscripts and material he used no longer exist.

== Early life ==
Charles Vallancé was born on 6 April 1731 in Westminster, London to Francis Vallancé and Mary Preston (the daughter of Thomas Preston of St Martin-in-the-Fields). Francis and Mary had married at the chapel of Greenwich Hospital, London on 21 June 1724. Vallancé eventually anglicised his surname to Vallancey and attended Eton College and the Royal Military Academy, Woolwich before being commissioned into Lord Tyrawley's Regiment of Foot (ranked as the 10th Regiment of Foot) of the British Army in 1747. He was attached to the Royal Engineers, became a lieutenant-general in 1798, and a general in 1803.

== To Ireland ==
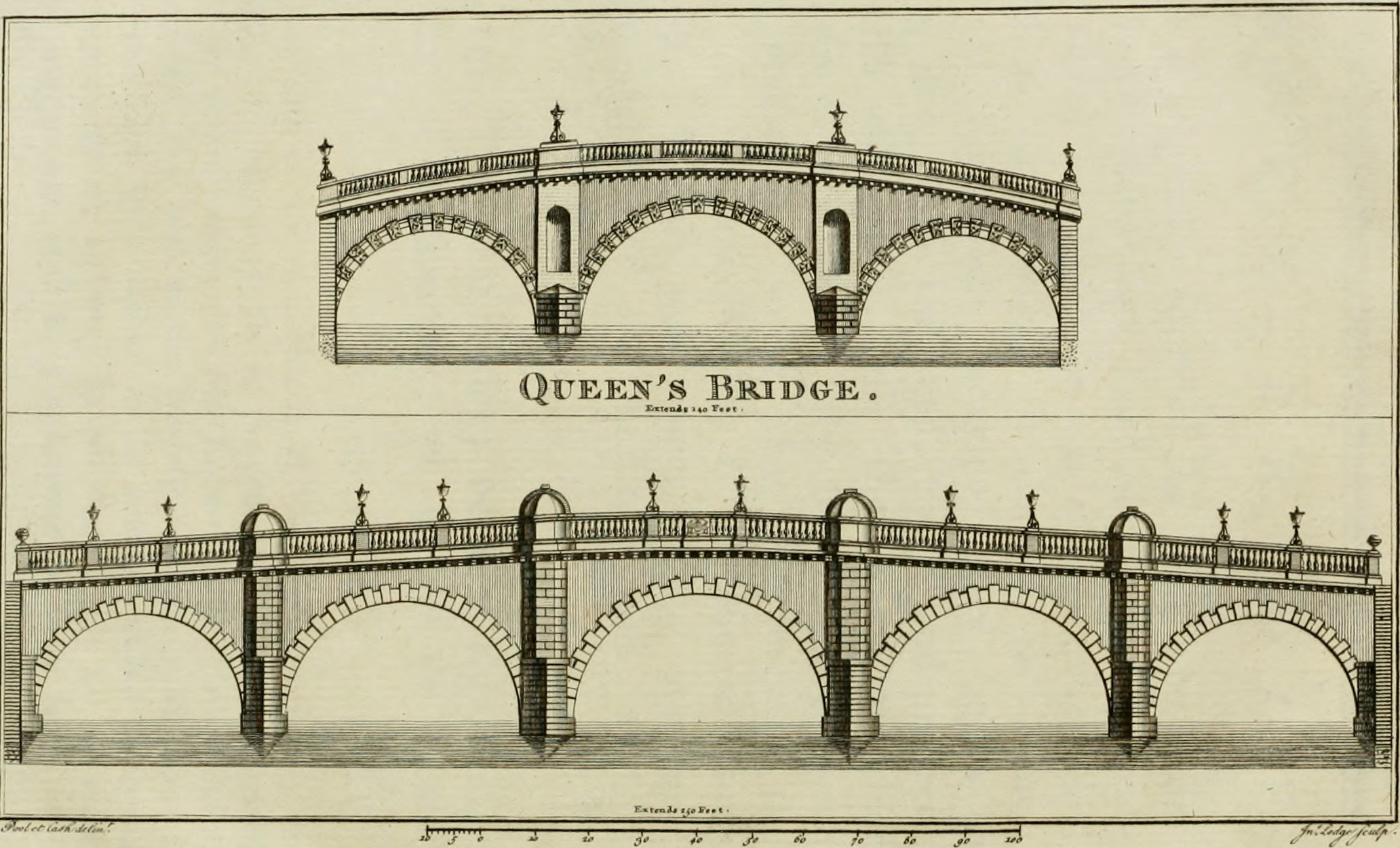
1780 illustration of Queens Bridge, which Vallancey assisted in designing

Vallancey came to Ireland before 1760 to assist in a military survey of the island, and made the country his adopted home. One of his first jobs was to assist with the design and construction of the still extant Queens Bridge from 1764-68.

His attention was strongly drawn towards the history, philology, and antiquities of Ireland at a time when they were almost entirely ignored, and he published the following, among other works: Collectanea de Rebus Hibernicis, 6 vols., between 1770 and 1804; Essay on the Irish Language, 1772; Grammar of the Irish Language, 1773; Vindication of the Ancient Kingdom of Ireland, 1786; Ancient History of Ireland proved from the Sanscrit Books, 1797; Prospectus of a Dictionary of the Aire Coti or Antient Irish, 1802. He was a member of many learned societies, was created an honorary LL.D., was elected a member of the American Philosophical Society in 1780, and became a fellow of the Royal Society in 1784. During the Insurrection of 1798 he furnished the Government with plans for the defence of Dublin. Queen's-bridge, Dublin, was built from his designs. He died 8 August 1812, aged 81.

He at one stage possessed the Great Book of Lecan which he passed on to the Royal Irish Academy.

In his book, A Vindication of the Ancient History of Ireland (1786) claimed that Zoroaster was none other than Nuada Airgetlam – Nuada of the Silver Hand – a member of Ireland's 'tribe of the Gods', the Tuatha De Dannan.

== Extract of 1778 report on West Cork ==
'There was only one road between Cork and Bantry; you may now proceed by eight carriage roads beside several horse tracks branching off from these great roads, from Bantry the country is mountainous and from the high road has the appearance of being barren and very thinly populated; yet the valleys abound with, corn and potatoes and the mountains are covered with black cattle in 1760, twenty years ago it was so thinly inhabited an army of 10,000 men could not possible have found subsistence between Bantry and Bandon. The face of the country now wears a different aspect: the sides of the hill are under the plough, the verges of the bogs are reclaimed and the southern coast from Skibbereen to Bandon is one continued garden of grain and potatoes except the barren pinnacles of some hills and the boggy hollows between which are preserved for fuel' (Original in British Library)

== 19th-century reflections ==
In the mid to late nineteenth century, there were portraits of him in the Royal Irish Academy and in the boardroom of the Royal Dublin Society. At that same time, research showed that his theories and conclusions—a fanciful compound of crude deductions from imperfect knowledge—were shown to be without value. George Petrie said: "It is a difficult and rather unpleasant task to follow a writer so rambling in his reasonings and so obscure in his style; his hypotheses are of a visionary nature." The Quarterly Review declared that: "General Vallancey, though a man of learning, wrote more nonsense than any man of his time, and has unfortunately been the occasion of much more than he wrote." The Edinburgh Review says: "To expose the continual error of his theory will not cure his inveterate disease. It can only excite hopes of preventing infection by showing that he has reduced that kind of writing to absurdity, and raised a warning monument to all antiquaries and philologians that may succeed him."
