= Seán Heuston =

Irish republican, member of Fianna Éireann (1891–1916)

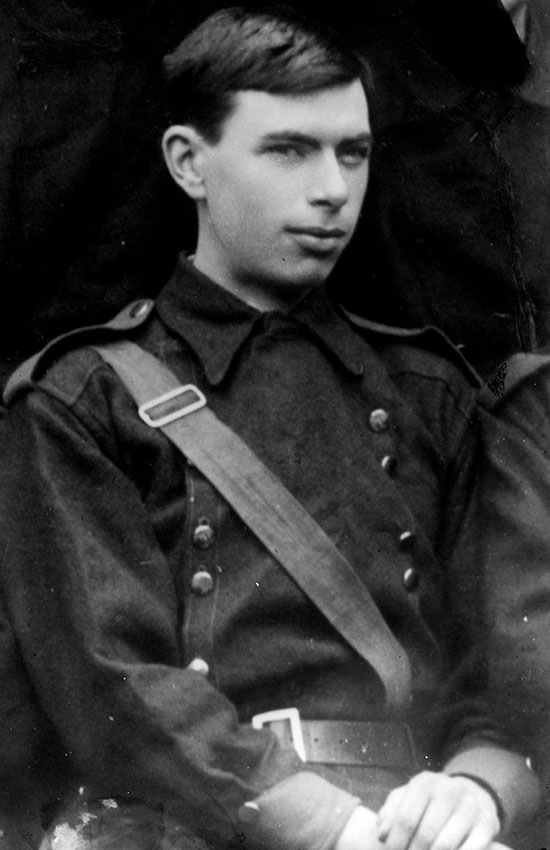
- Born: John Joseph Heuston; 21 February 1891; Dublin, County Dublin, Ireland
- Died: 8 May 1916 (aged 25); Kilmainham Gaol, Dublin, Ireland
- Cause of death: Execution by firing squad
- Military career
- Allegiance: Irish Republic
- Branch: Irish Volunteers; Fianna Éireann
- Service years: 1913–1916
- Rank: Captain, Irish Volunteers; Vice-Commandant, Fianna Éireann
- Commands: D Company, 1st Battalion, Dublin Brigade, Irish Volunteers; Director of Training, Fianna Éireann
- Conflicts: Easter Rising
- Memorials: Seán Heuston Bridge; Heuston railway station

Seán Heuston (/ˈhjuːstən/ HEW-stən; Irish: Seán Mac Aodha; born John Joseph Heuston; 21 February 1891 – 8 May 1916) was an Irish republican rebel and member of Fianna Éireann who took part in the Easter Rising of 1916. With about 20 Volunteers, he held the Mendicity Institution on the River Liffey for over two days, though it was originally only intended to be held for 3–4 hours. He was executed by firing squad on 8 May in Kilmainham Gaol. His court-martial record at Kew spells his name as Hewston J.J..

== Early life ==
Heuston was born at Gloucester Street in Dublin on 21 February 1891, the son of clerk John Heuston and Maria McDonald. The family was Irish Catholic, but bore the English-language surname Heuston from the time of Seán's grandfather's enlistee service in the British Army in the years following the Irish Potato Famine in the mid-1800s. The name Heuston was originally brought to Ireland from the Scottish Barony of Lanarkshire during the time of the settlement of the Ulster Plantation.

Educated by the Christian Brothers, he joined Great Southern and Western Railway where he worked as a railway clerk in Limerick. While there he joined Fianna Éireann, of which he was an active member. Seán Heuston arranged for members who could not afford to buy their uniforms to do so by paying small weekly sums. Under his guidance the Fianna in Limerick had a course which encompassed not only drilling, including signalling, scout training and weapons training, but also lectures on Irish history and Irish classes. In 1913, Heuston was transferred by GS&WR to Dublin, where he joined Emmet Sluagh. He was Director of Training for Fianna Eireann as well as being Vice-Commandant of the Dublin Battalion and Commander of its 6th Company from August 1915 to Easter 1916. He joined the Irish Volunteers, becoming Captain of D Company, 1st Battalion.

== Easter Rising ==
Heuston was the Officer Commanding the Irish Volunteers assigned to hold the Mendicity Institution (now called Heustons Fort) on the south side of Dublin city which guarded against the British approach to the strategically important Four Courts buildings. Acting under orders from James Connolly, Heuston was to hold this position for three or four hours, to delay the advance of British troops. This delay was necessary to give the headquarters staff time to prepare their defences. Having successfully held the position for the specified period, he was to go on to hold it for over two days, with twenty-six Volunteers. With his position becoming untenable against considerable numbers, and the building almost completely surrounded, he sent a dispatch to Connolly informing him of their position. The dispatch was carried by two Volunteers, P. J. Stephenson and Seán McLaughlin, who had to avoid both sniper fire and British troops across the city. It was soon after sending this dispatch that Heuston decided to surrender.

== The Surrender ==
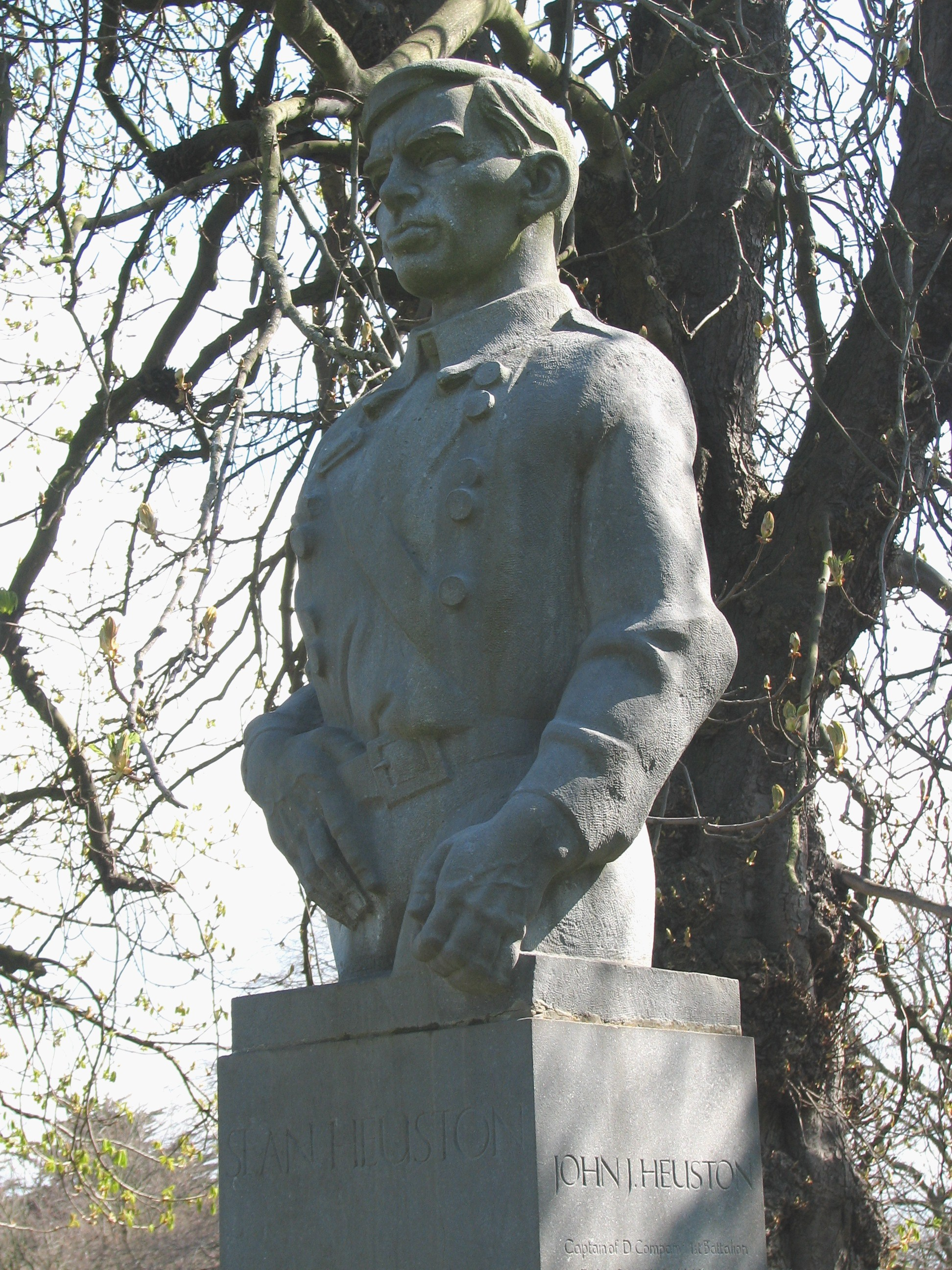
Sean Heuston Phoenix Park

Séamus Brennan, a member of the Mendicity Institution Garrison under Heuston, gave the following account of the decision to surrender:

Our tiny garrison twenty-six—had battled all morning against three or four hundred British troops. Machine-gun and rifle fire kept up a constant battering of our position. Seán visited each post in turn, encouraging us. But now we were faced with a new form of attack. The enemy, closing in, began to hurl grenades into the building. Our only answer was to try to catch these and throw them back before they exploded. Two of our men, Liam Staines and Dick Balfe, both close friends of Seán's were badly wounded doing this. We had almost run out of ammunition. Dog-tired, without food, trapped, hopelessly outnumbered, we had reached the limit of our endurance. After consultation with the rest of us, Seán decided that the only hope for the wounded and, indeed, for the safety of all of us, was to surrender. Not everyone approved but the order was obeyed and we destroyed as much equipment as we could before giving ourselves up...

== Prisoners ==
According to the statement given by Séamus Brennan to Piaras F. Mac Lochlainn, author of Last Words, the British troops were "infuriated when they saw the pygmy force that had given them such a stiff battle and caused them so many casualties".

They screamed at us, cursed us, manhandled us. An officer asked who was in charge and Sean stepped out in front without a word… We were forced to march to the Royal (now Collins) Barracks with our hands up, held behind our heads. In the Barracks we were lined up on the parade ground. Here we were attacked by British soldiers, kicked, beaten, spat upon.

Séamus Brennan never saw Seán Heuston again after being transferred to Arbour Hill Detention Barracks.

== Court martial ==
Heuston had been transferred to Richmond Barracks, and on 4 May 1916, he was tried by court-martial. On the Sunday, 7 May 1916, the verdict of the court martial was communicated to him that he had been sentenced to death and was to be shot at dawn the following morning.

== Execution ==
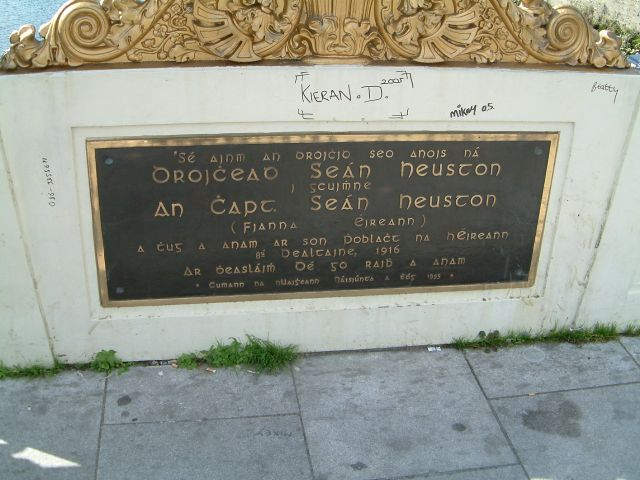
Seán Heuston Bridge and Heuston railway station in Dublin are both named in his honour. He worked in the Traffic Manager's Office in the latter

Prior to his execution he was attended by Father Albert, O.F.M. Cap in his final hours. Father Albert wrote an account of those hours up to and including the execution:

…We were now told to be ready. I had a small cross in my hand, and though blindfolded, Seán bent his head and kissed the Crucifix; this was the last thing his lips touched in life. He then whispered to me: 'Father, sure you won't forget to anoint me?' I had told him in his cell that I would anoint him when he was shot. We now proceeded towards the yard where the execution was to take place; my left arm was linked in his right, while the British soldier who had handcuffed and blindfolded him walked on his left. As we walked slowly along we repeated most of the prayers that we had been saying in the cell. On our way we passed a group of soldiers; these I afterwards learned were awaiting Commandant Mallin; who was following us. Having reached a second yard I saw there another group of military armed with rifles. Some of these were standing, and some sitting or kneeling. A soldier directed Seán and myself to a corner of the yard, a short distance from the outer wall of the prison. Here there was a box (seemingly a soap box) and Sean was told to sit down upon it. He was perfectly calm, and said with me for the last time: 'My Jesus, mercy.' I scarcely had moved away a few yards when a volley went off, and this noble soldier of Irish Freedom fell dead. I rushed over to anoint him; his whole face seemed transformed and lit up with a grandeur and brightness that I had never before noticed.

Father Albert concluded:

Never did I realise that men could fight so bravely, and die so beautifully, and so fearlessly as did the Heroes of Easter Week. On the morning of Sean Heuston's death I would have given the world to have been in his place, he died in such a noble and sacred cause, and went forth to meet his Divine Saviour with such grand Christian sentiments of trust, confidence and love.
