= Seán Heuston Bridge =

Bridge over the River Liffey in Ireland

Seán Heuston Bridge Droichead Seán Heuston
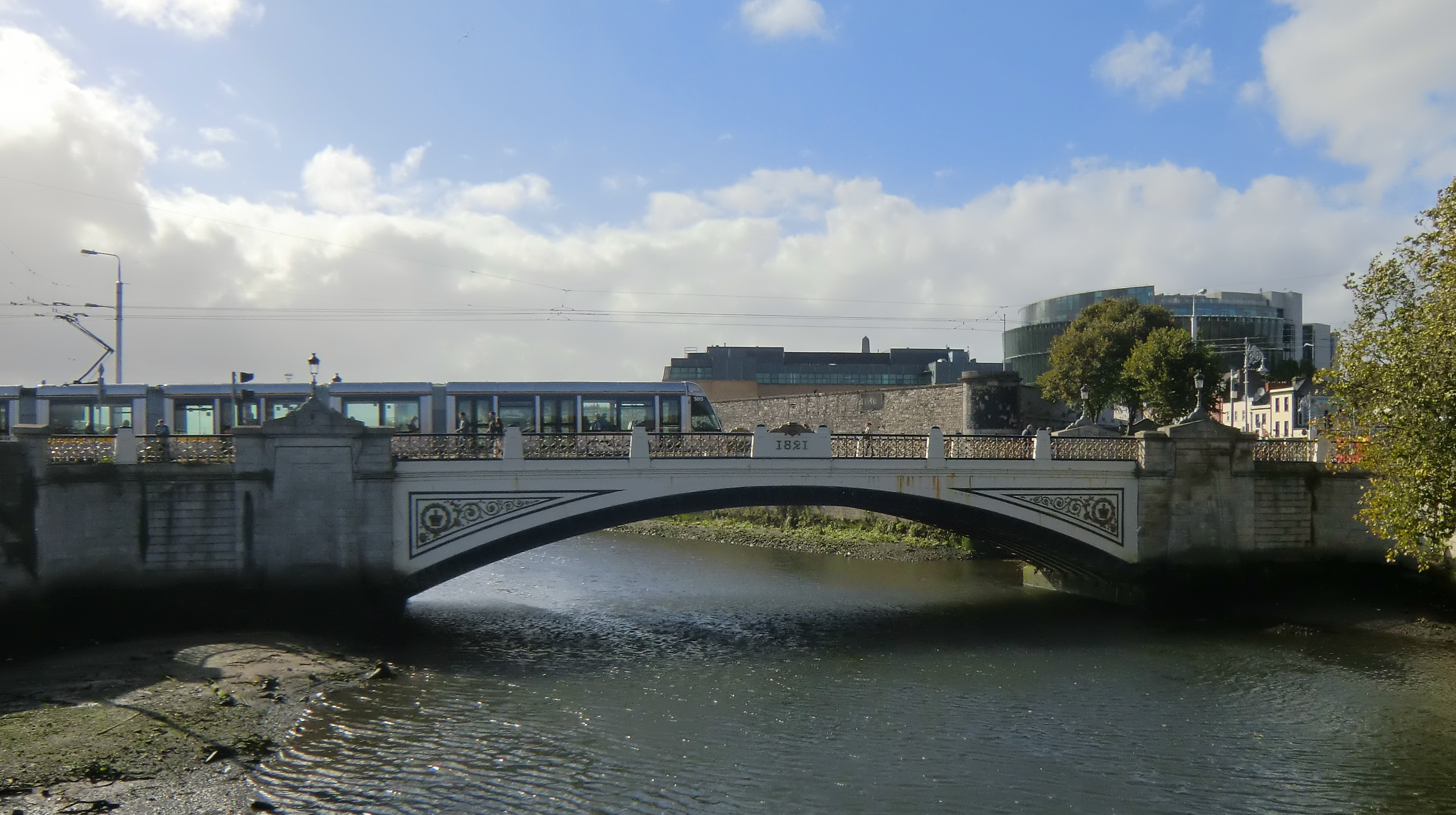
- Seán Heuston Bridge seen from Frank Sherwin Bridge
- Coordinates: 53.3474°N 6.2918°W
- Carries: Luas, pedestrians
- Crosses: River Liffey
- Locale: Dublin, Ireland
- Other name(s): King's Bridge (1828-1923), Sarsfield Bridge (1923-41)
- Preceded by: Liffey Railway Bridge
- Followed by: Frank Sherwin Bridge

Characteristics
- Material: Cast-iron
- Total length: ~30m
- Width: ~9m
- No. of spans: 1

History
- Designer: George Papworth
- Construction start: December 1827
- Construction end: 1828

Location
- Interactive map of Seán Heuston Bridge

Seán Heuston Bridge (Irish: Droichead Seán Heuston) is a cast iron bridge spanning the River Liffey beside Heuston station in Dublin, Ireland. Originally named King's Bridge and later Sarsfield Bridge, the bridge, which was previously used for road traffic, now carries pedestrian and Luas (tram) traffic.

== History ==
=== Origins ===
Originally designed by George Papworth to carry horsedrawn traffic, the foundation stone was laid on 12 December 1827. The iron castings for the bridge were produced at the Royal Phoenix Iron Works in nearby Parkgate Street. (The foundry which also produced the parapets for the upstream Lucan Bridge). Construction was completed in 1828, and the bridge was opened with the name King's Bridge to commemorate a visit by King George IV in 1821.

The bridge has an overall width of just under 9 metres.

=== Renamings ===
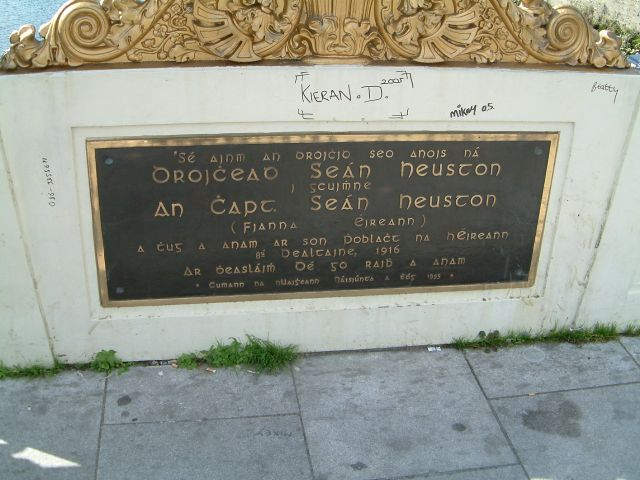
Naming plaque - Seán Heuston Bridge

In 1923, the bridge was renamed as Sarsfield Bridge after Patrick Sarsfield, 1st Earl of Lucan (1655—1693). In 1941, it was again renamed as the Seán Heuston Bridge for Seán Heuston (1891—1916), who was executed for his part in the 1916 Easter Rising. The bridge and adjacent train station are, however, still sometimes referred to by older Dubliners as "Kings Bridge" and "Kings Bridge Station" respectively.

=== Luas ===
After the Frank Sherwin Bridge was opened nearby in the 1980s, Seán Heuston Bridge was no longer used to carry road traffic. It was restored in 2003 and now carries Luas tram traffic on the red line.

== Gallery ==
King's Bridge Station with King's Bridge in the foreground c.1900

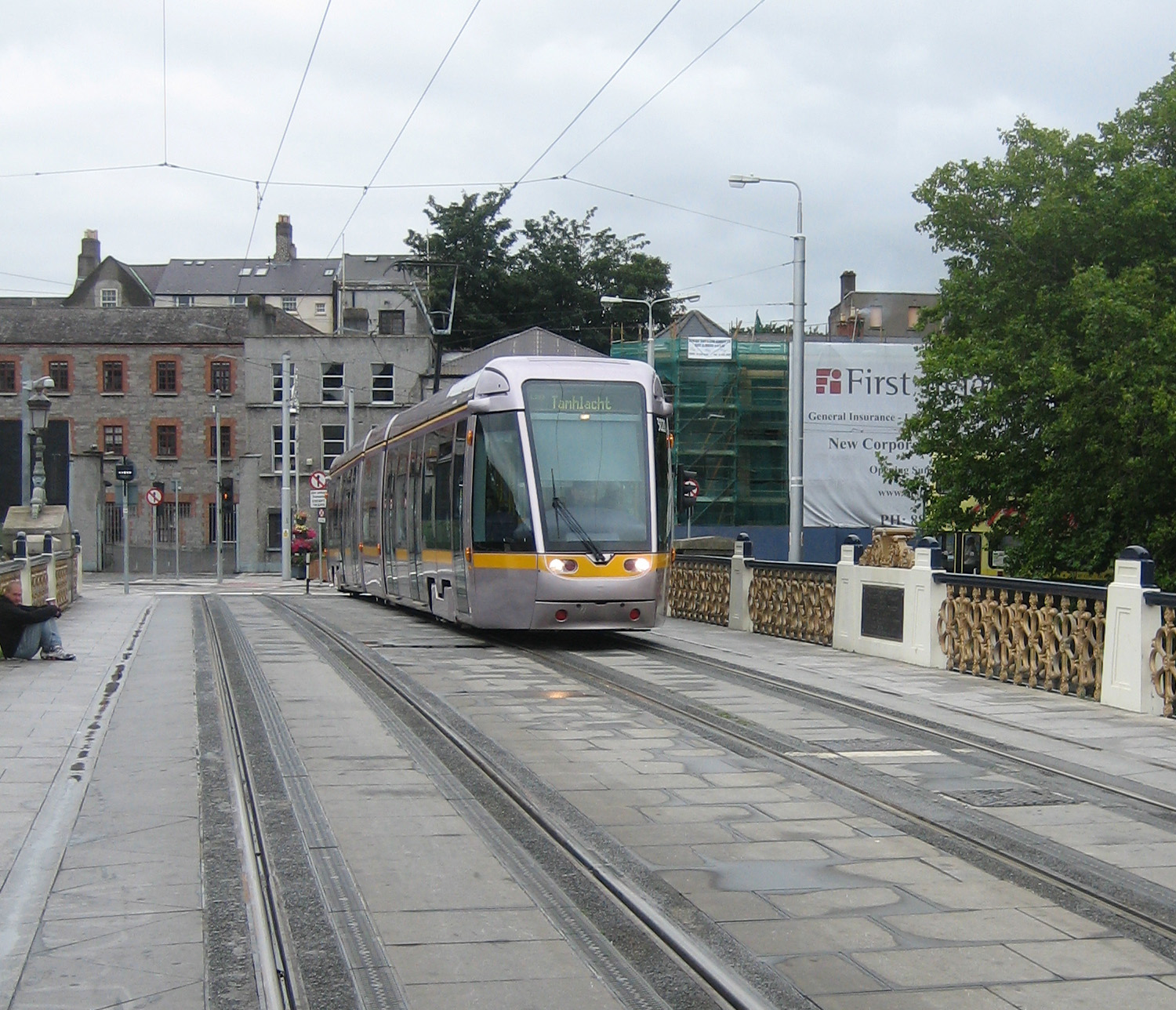
Luas tram crossing Seán Heuston Bridge from Wolfetone Avenue towards Heuston station
