= Chalkie White =

Chalkie White or Chalky White may refer to:

- Chalkie White (rugby union), English rugby player and coach
- Chalkie White (swimmer), retired Irish swimmer and swimming coach
- Steve White (footballer) or Chalky White, English footballer
- Chalkie White, a character performed by comedian Jim Davidson
- Chalkie White, a character in the Andy Capp comic strip
- Albert "Chalky" White, a character in Boardwalk Empire
