= Chalky Mount =

Mountain in Barbados

Coordinates: 13.2175°N 59.5508°W

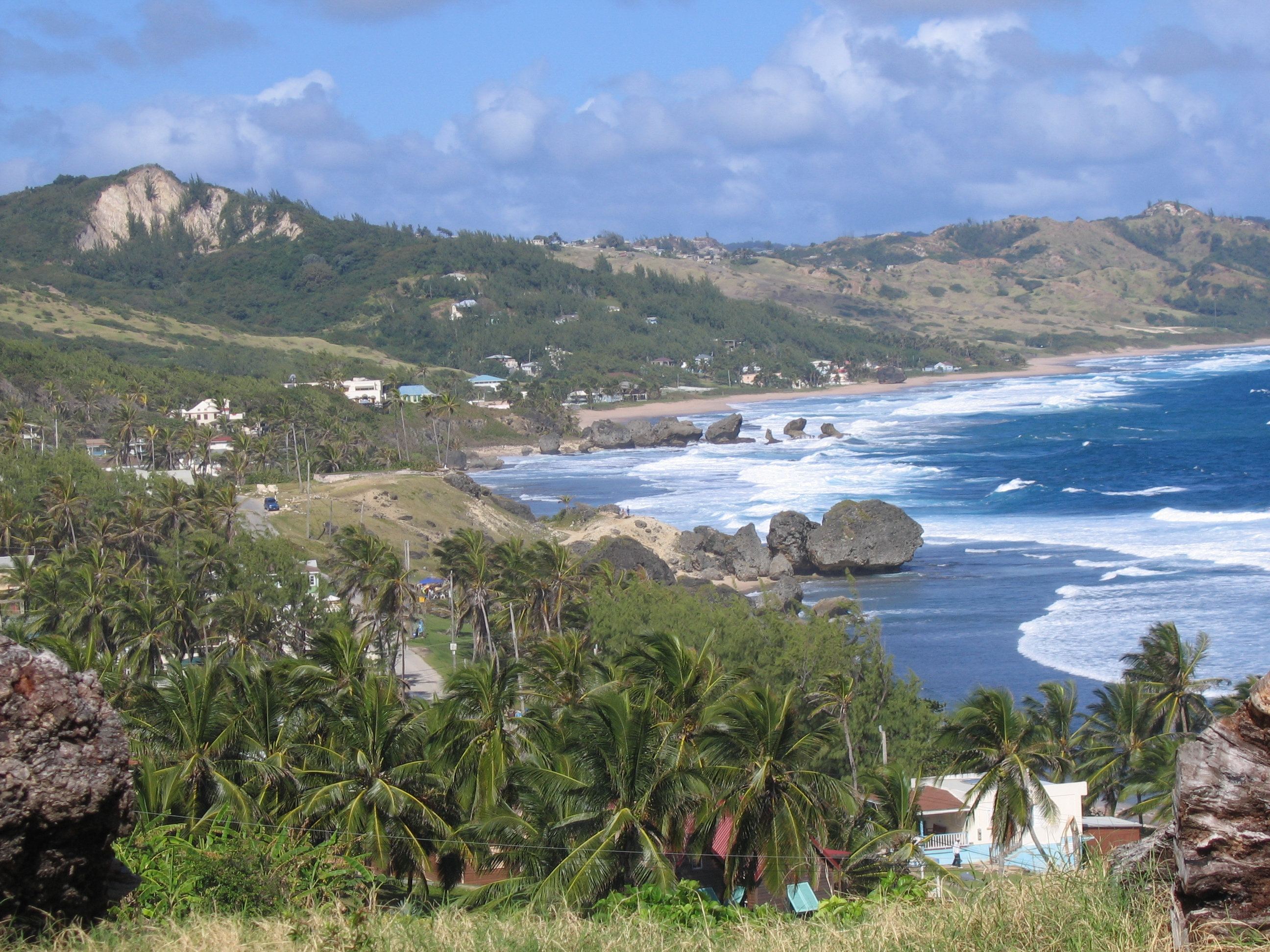
View on the hills from the coastline

Chalky Mount is a rugged picturesque range of hills in Saint Andrew, Barbados, forming a jagged profile against the horizon when viewed from the east coast - commonly called Napoleon's Head.

Chalky Mount has considerable clay deposits and is the home of the potteries, one of Barbados' most important cottage industries, established in the nineteenth century.
