= Cecil Fagan (water polo) =

Irish water polo player (1899–1977)

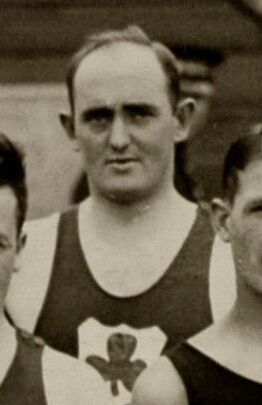
- Cecil Fagan in 1928

Personal information
- Nationality: Irish
- Born: 3 October 1899 Dublin, Ireland
- Died: 31 March 1977 (aged 77) Rathgar, Ireland

Sport
- Sport: Water polo

Cecil Edward Fagan (3 October 1899 – 31 March 1977) was an Irish water polo player. He competed in the men's tournament at the 1924 Summer Olympics.
