= James Joyce Bridge =

Bridge over the River Liffey in Ireland

James Joyce Bridge Droichead James Joyce
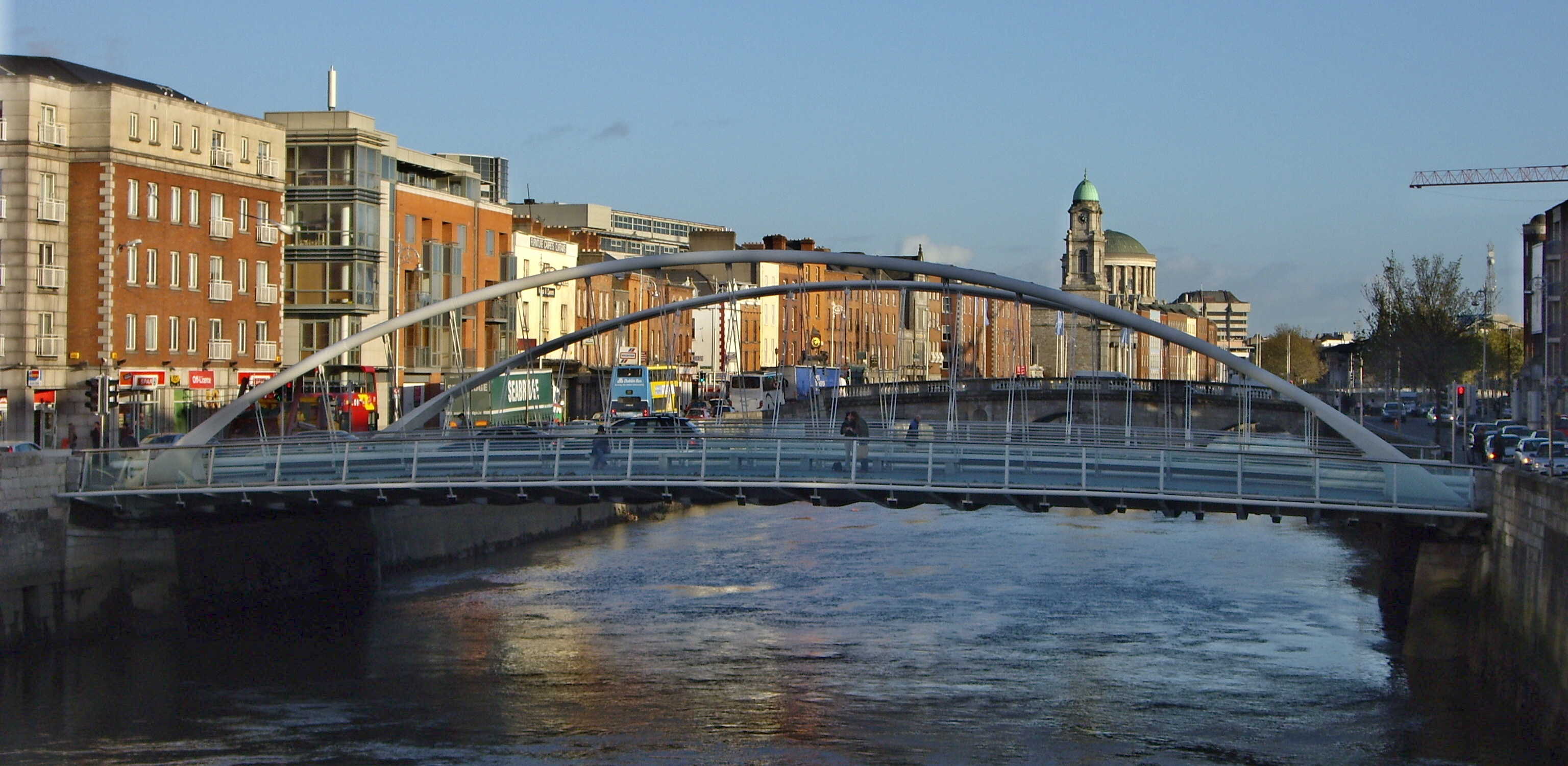
- James Joyce Bridge - looking downstream
- Coordinates: 53.34667°N 6.2825°W
- Carries: Road and pedestrian traffic
- Crosses: River Liffey
- Locale: Dublin, Ireland
- Preceded by: Rory O'More Bridge
- Followed by: Mellows Bridge

Characteristics
- Design: Tied-arch bridge
- Material: Steel, glass
- Total length: 40m
- Width: 30m
- No. of spans: 1

History
- Designer: Santiago Calatrava
- Constructed by: Irishenco, Harland and Wolff
- Opened: 16 June 2003 (Bloomsday)

Location
- Interactive map of James Joyce Bridge

James Joyce Bridge (Irish: Droichead James Joyce) is a road bridge spanning the River Liffey in Dublin, Ireland, joining the south quays to Blackhall Place on the northside.

Designed by Spanish architect Santiago Calatrava, it is a single-span structural steel design, 40 m (131 ft) long. The deck is supported from two outward angled arches, the silhouette of which is sometimes compared to the shape of an open book.

The bridge was built by Irishenco Construction, using pre-fabricated steel sections from Harland and Wolff of Belfast.

The bridge is named for the famous Dublin author James Joyce (1882–1941), and was opened on 16 June 2003 (Bloomsday). Joyce's short story "The Dead" is set in Number 15 Usher's Island, the house facing the bridge on the south side.

Writing of the design of the bridge, the Irish Times noted "It would, of course, have been much easier – and cheaper – to build a flat road bridge similar to the utilitarian structure of Frank Sherwin Bridge near Heuston Station. But the city manager, John Fitzgerald, took the view that a bridge of considerable aesthetic merit was warranted."

== See also ==
- Samuel Beckett Bridge
