= Rory O'More Bridge =

Bridge over the River Liffey in Dublin, Ireland

Rory O'More Bridge Droichead Ruaraí Uí Mhóra
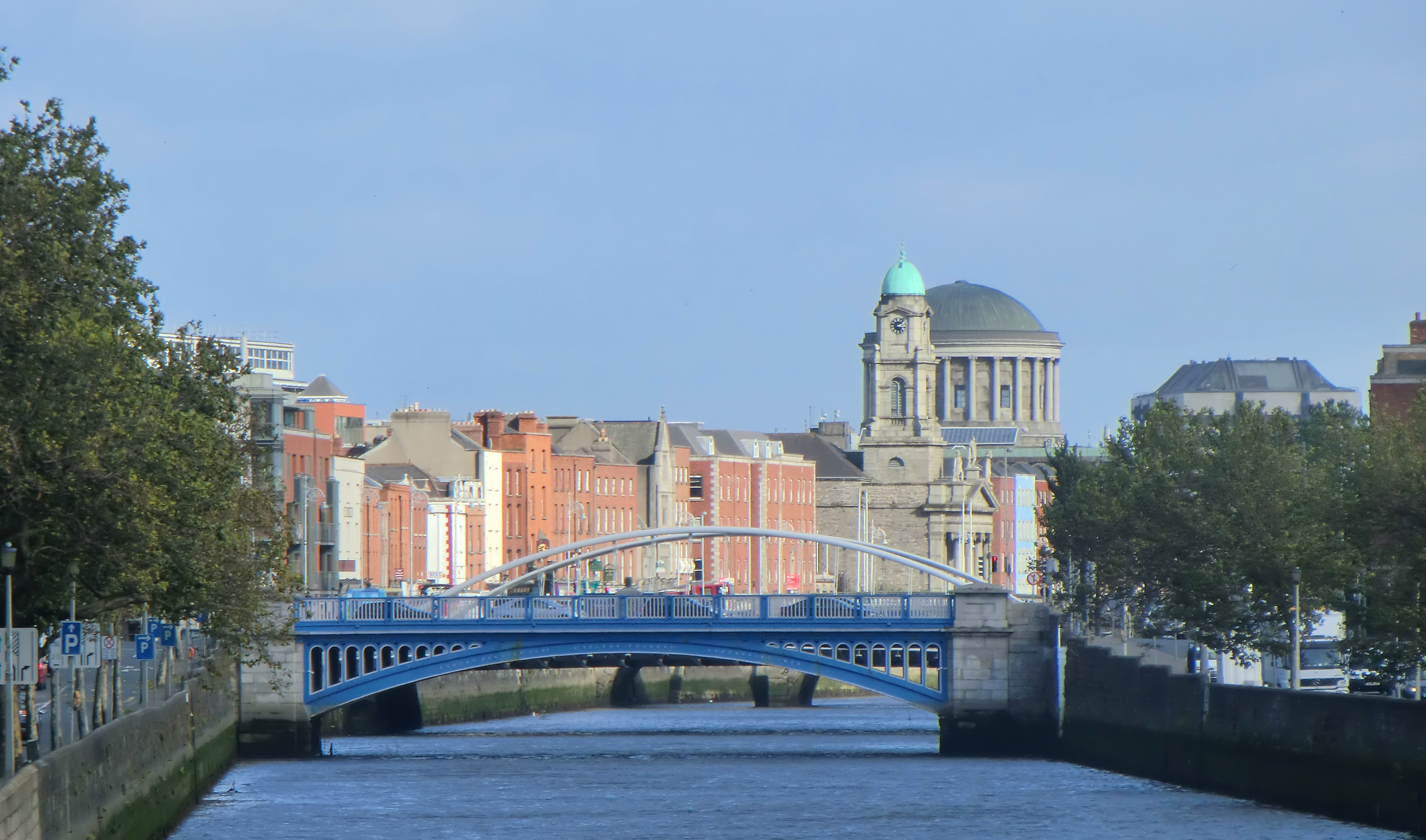
- View of Rory O'More Bridge from Frank Sherwin Bridge
- Coordinates: 53.3467°N 6.284°W
- Crosses: River Liffey
- Locale: Dublin, Ireland
- Preceded by: Frank Sherwin Bridge
- Followed by: James Joyce Bridge

Characteristics
- Design: Arch bridge (iron)
- Material: Cast iron (arch), wrought iron (deck), granite (abutments)
- Total length: 29m
- Width: 10m
- No. of spans: 1

History
- Designer: George Halpin
- Opened: First 1670: Bloody Bridge; Rebuilt 1675: Barrack Bridge; Rebuilt 1859: Victoria & Albert Bridge; Renamed 1939: Rory O'More Bridge

Location
- Interactive map of Rory O'More Bridge

Rory O'More Bridge (Irish: Droichead Ruaraí Uí Mhóra) is a road bridge spanning the River Liffey in Dublin, Ireland and joining Watling Street (by the Guinness grounds) to Ellis Street and the north quays. Built on the site of previous wooden and stone bridges, the 19th-century cast iron bridge was originally named the Victoria & Albert Bridge or simply Victoria Bridge. Known as Emancipation Bridge by the early 1930s, it was renamed in honour of Rory (Rodger) O'More in 1939.

== History ==
=== Bloody Bridge ===
In 1670, the first bridge was erected on the site, which was made of wood and replaced a ferry which operated at this point. It became known locally as "Bloody Bridge" following an incident in which ferrymen attempted to destroy the bridge on several occasions (in an ill-fated attempt to protect their livelihoods). Twenty men were arrested and while they were being transferred to the Bridewell Prison, a rescue attempt was made resulting in the death of four men.

=== Barrack Bridge ===
The timber bridge was replaced by a stone bridge, and was completed in 1704. It was officially named Barrack Bridge after the nearby Royal Barracks, which had its foundation stone laid in 1701. In 1811, a stone and masonry gateway known as the Richmond Tower was constructed beside it by the architect Francis Johnston. This tower was later relocated to the Royal Hospital, Kilmainham after traffic congestion increased with the arrival of the railway in 1847. The Barrack Bridge was replaced in 1859 by the cast-iron structure which is present to this day.

=== Victoria & Albert Bridge / Victoria Bridge ===
Designed by George Halpin, the bridge was fabricated at the foundry of Robert Daglish in St Helens, Lancashire, from cast iron (with a wrought iron deck) and is supported on granite abutments. Both the upstream and the downstream sides of the bridge were transported by ship and brought up river to be manoeuvred into position at the site. The bridge was completed in 1859 and opened to the public in 1861 by Queen Victoria and Prince Albert. Some sources state that the bridge was named the Victoria & Albert Bridge, whereas others state that it was the Victoria Bridge.

=== Rory O'More Bridge ===
For the centenary celebrations of Catholic emancipation in 1929, an altar was erected on the bridge for the celebration of Benediction and the bridge became known as Emancipation Bridge for some years following. In the 1930s, the bridge was renamed for Rory O'More (1600–1655), one of the key figures from the plot to capture Dublin as part of the Irish Rebellion of 1641.
