= Chalkie White (swimmer) =

Irish swimmer and coach

Francis White
Personal information
- Nationality: Ireland
- Born: 26 April 1955 (age 71) Dublin, Ireland

Sport
- Sport: Swimming
- Strokes: Freestyle, Butterfly, Medley
- College team: Villanova University

Francis White is a retired Irish swimmer and swimming coach.

White was born in Dublin in 1955. He started swimming at the age of 9, and swam with the Guinness and Kings Hospital clubs. After Donnacha O'Dea, he was one of the first Irish swimmers to be successful internationally. He was an international swimmer from 1968 to 1980, and was a 1,500m freestyle European champion in 1975. Later he coached two Olympic swimmers, in 1988 in Seoul and in 1992 in Barcelona.

In 1969 White was sixth in the European junior 1,500m freestyle and later finished tenth in the European senior 100m butterfly. Between 1972 and 1976 he attended Villanova University on a swimming scholarship. During his time there he won two Eastern Collegiate titles, at 200m butterfly and 400m individual medley, in 1975, and held five Villanova school records. He won the 1975 European Cup in the 1,500m freestyle at Athens. White won over 40 Irish national senior titles in freestyle, backstroke, butterfly, and individual medley. He was the Texaco Swimming Sportstar of the Year in 1971.

As a masters swimmer White has won several European titles.

During the 1990s White worked alongside Gary O'Toole to expose sexual abuse and other corruption in the Irish Amateur Swimming Association. White, and his sister Loraine, is a survivor of abuse by convicted by serial child sex offender George Gibney.

He is the maternal uncle of artist and songwriter Lauren White Murphy.
