= Timeline of Dublin =

Coordinates: 53.347778°N 6.259722°W

The following is a timeline of the history of the city of Dublin, Ireland.

== Prior to 9th century ==
- 431 - Palladius is ordained the first bishop of Ireland by Pope Celestine I. He is later banished by the King of Leinster.
- c.450 - Christianity was expanded by Saint Patrick.

== 9th–15th centuries ==
- 841 – Viking camp established.
- c.846 - St. Mary's Abbey founded on the North side of the River Liffey.
- 1014 – Battle of Clontarf.
- 1028 – Christ Church founded (approximate date).
- 1171 – Henry II of England in power.
- 1172 – Dublin "given charter and made centre of English Pale."
- 1176 - Strongbow, earl of Pembroke leader of the Anglo-Norman forces, dies in Dublin.
- 1185 – St Catherine's Church built.
- 1190 – Fire.
- 1190 - First iteration of St. Audoen's Church erected.
- 1191 – St Patrick's Cathedral construction begins.
- 1192 - Prince John, Lord of Ireland grants the citizens of Dublin by charter the ability to form guilds.
- 1204 - John, King of England grants a licence to the corporation of Dublin to hold an annual eight-day fair in Dublin, henceforth it is known as Donnybrook Fair and continues until it is shut down by the authorities in 1855.
- 1207 - John, King of England grants a charter to the inhabitants of Dublin.
- 1229 – Richard Muton becomes first Lord Mayor of Dublin.
- 1230 – Dublin Castle built.
- 1283 – Fire.
- 1348 – Black Death.
- 1394 - Richard II of England enters Dublin with 30,000 bowmen, 4000 cavalry and the Crown Jewels.
- 1446 – Weavers' Guild chartered.
- 1466 - Ireland's first public clock was installed on the tower of the Tholsel

== 16th–17th centuries ==
- 1534 - Lord Thomas Fitzgerald, better known as Silken Thomas organised a rebellion and was executed in Tyburn two years later.
- 1538 - Destruction of the Bachal Isu by George Browne, Archbishop of Dublin.
- 1541 – Dublin becomes capital of the Kingdom of Ireland.
- 1592 – Trinity College founded.
- 1597 – 11 March: Dublin gunpowder explosion.
- 1610 - John Speed's Map of Dublin (1610)
- 1635 – Theatre built.
- 1646 – City besieged by Parliamentarians.
- 1649 – Siege of Dublin
- 1661 – Dublin Corporation (city government) established.
- 1662
  - Smock Alley Theatre opens.
  - Royal Hunting Park established.
  - The uniting of the smaller parishes of St Stephen and St Michael le Pole with St. Bride's.
- 1664
  - Saint Stephen's Green enclosed by a wall.
  - Newman coffeehouse in business.
- 1666 – Cabbage Garden cemetery in use.
- 1676 - Construction of Essex Bridge opens up development on the North side of the River Liffey
- 1680 – Hibernian Catch Club founded (approximate date).
- 1681 – A new Tholsel building was constructed near Christchurch to house the activities of Dublin Corporation
- 1682 – Weavers' Guild hall built in The Coombe.
- 1683 – Dublin Philosophical Society founded.
- 1689 - James II opens a royal mint at 27 Capel Street.

== 18th century ==
- 1702 – State Paper Office established in Dublin Castle.
- 1707 – Marsh's Library incorporated.
- 1707 - The original Custom House opens on Custom House Quay, Dublin.
- 1708 – The Registry of Deeds is established by an Irish Act of Parliament entitled "An Act for the Publick Registering of all Deeds, Conveyances and Wills that shall be made of any Honors, Manors, Lands, Tenements or Hereditaments". The Registry is initially based in Dublin Castle.
- 1709 – St. Luke's Church built.
- 1710 – Mansion House (residence) built.
- 1722 - Equestrian statue of George I purchased by the city for £2,000 and erected on a plinth on the upstream side of Essex bridge.
- 1725 - Henrietta Street is laid out by Luke Gardiner as Dublin's first Georgian street.
- 1731 – 25 June: Royal Dublin Society founded.
- 1742 – 13 April: Handel's Messiah is premiered in Neale's Musick Hall, Dublin.
- 1745 – Dublin Lying-In Hospital and Phoenix Park open.
- 1748 – Leinster House built.
- 1750 – Daly's Club active (approximate date).
- 1751 – Royal Hibernian Hotel established.
- 1753 – Parliament Street laid out.
- 1757 – Wide Streets Commission established.
- 1759 – Guinness brewery in business.
- 1763 - Freeman's Journal begins publication
- 1770
  - City directory published.
  - Trinity College Historical Society founded.
- 1771 - City Assembly House built.
- 1779 – Royal Exchange built.
- 1783 – Bank of Ireland in business.
- 1784 – Royal College of Surgeons in Ireland founded.
- 1785 – Royal Irish Academy established.
- 1791
  - Society of United Irishmen Dublin branch founded.
  - Dublin Library Society instituted.
  - Apothecaries Hall incorporated.
  - Custom House built.
- 1792 - Fitzwilliam Square laid out.
- 1793 – Dublin Stock Exchange founded.
- 1794 – Carlisle Bridge constructed.
- 1796 – Building of the Four Courts commences.

== 19th century ==
- 1801 – City becomes part of the United Kingdom of Great Britain and Ireland.
- 1802 - Completion of the Four Courts, Ireland's most prominent courts building.
- 1804
  - Grand Canal constructed.
  - Cork Street Fever Hospital opens.
- 1809 – Nelson's Pillar erected.
- 1815 – Tenter House built on Cork Street.
- 1817
  - Royal Canal constructed.
  - Cobourg Gardens open.
- 1818
  - General Post Office inaugurated.
  - Mountjoy Square constructed.
- 1821 – Population: 185,881.
- 1822 – 12 December: Storm.
- 1824 – Shelbourne Hotel in business.
- 1828 – Kings Bridge constructed.
- 1829 – Museum of the Royal Irish Academy established (approximate date).
- 1830 – Royal Zoological Society of Ireland founded.
- 1831 – Dublin Zoo opens.
- 1832 – Dublin Penny Journal and Paddy Kelly's Budget begin publication.
- 1833 – Dublin University Magazine begins publication.
- 1837 - Fire at the Royal Arcade on College Green which destroyed multiple buildings on Suffolk Street and College Green.
- 1838 – Glasnevin Model Farm established.
- 1839
  - Adelaide Hospital founded.
  - The Citizen begins publication.
- 1842 – The Nation newspaper begins publication.
- 1843 – Dublin University Philosophical Society active.
- 1846 – All Hallows cemetery in use.
- 1854 – Catholic University of Ireland founded.
- 1857 – Natural History Museum opens.
- 1858 – St Catherine's Church dedicated on Meath Street.
- 1861 – Wellington Monument erected.
- 1865 – Royal College of Science for Ireland founded.
- 1871 – Gaiety Theatre opens.
- 1872 – Dublin tramways begin operating.
- 1873 – Irish Monthly begins publication.
- 1877
  - National Museum of Ireland established.
  - Dublin Metropolitan School of Art active.
- 1879
  - Star of Erin Music Hall opens.
  - Butt Bridge constructed.
- 1880 – St. Stephen's Park Temperance Hotel in business.
- 1882 – 6 May: Phoenix Park Murders.
- 1889 – Davy Byrne's pub in business.
- 1891 – Dublin United Transport Company formed.
- 1894 – New Ireland Review begins publication.
- 1895 – Shelbourne Football Club formed.
- 1898 – Dublin Port and Docks Board established.

== 20th century ==
- 1901 - Population: 290,638.
- 1904 – Abbey Theatre opens.
- 1905 – Irish Independent newspaper begins publication.
- 1907 – Irish International Exhibition held.
- 1909 – Volta Cinematograph opens.
- 1913
  - Croke Park stadium opens.
  - Dublin Lock-out begins.
- 1916 – April: Easter Rising.
- 1918 – 15 December: Death of Molly Malone
- 1919 – 21 January: First Dáil (parliament) convenes in Mansion House.
- 1921 – 25 May: Burning of the Custom House.
- 1922
  - June–July: Battle of Dublin.
  - December: City becomes capital of the newly formed Irish Free State.
  - December: Oireachtas (parliament) begins meeting in Leinster House.
  - Dublin Opinion begins publication.
- 1923 – The Dublin Magazine begins publication.
- 1928 – Gate Theatre founded.
- 1930 – City boundaries expanded.
- 1934 – Old Dublin Society founded.
- 1937 – City becomes capital of the newly formed Republic of Ireland.
- 1938 – Dublin Historical Record begins publication.
- 1940
  - 26 August: Bombing of Dublin in World War II by German forces begins.
  - The Bell (magazine) begins publication.
- 1941
  - 31 May: North Strand Bombing
  - Dublin Airport terminal built.
  - Saint Mary's College for Domestic Science opens.
- 1949 – Envoy, A Review of Literature and Art begins publication.
- 1953 – City boundaries expanded.
- 1954 – 16 June: Bloomsday begins.
- 1960 – Population: 468,103.
- 1966
  - 8 March: Nelson's Pillar bombed.
  - Project Arts Centre established.
  - Garden of Remembrance opens.
- 1971 – Eurovision Song Contest 1971 held.
- 1972 – 1 February: British Embassy in Merrion Square destroyed by protesters.
- 1973 – Grapevine Arts Centre founded.
- 1974
  - Dublin and Monaghan bombings
  - Wood Quay excavation begins.
- 1975 – Accountancy and Business College founded.
- 1978 – Talbot Memorial Bridge constructed.
- 1979 – Dublin City Archives established.
- 1980 – First Dublin Fringe Festival is held.
- 1981 – Eurovision Song Contest 1981 held.
- 1983
  - Dublin Pride begins.
  - Dublin Food Co-op founded.
- 1984
  - Dublin Area Rapid Transit begins operating.
  - East-Link Bridge opens.
- 1987
  - International Financial Services Centre, Dublin Bus, and Irish Traditional Music Archive founded.
  - Northside People newspaper begins publication.
- 1988 – Eurovision Song Contest 1988 held.
- 1989 – Dublin City University active.
- 1991
  - Irish Museum of Modern Art opens.
  - Dublin Civic Trust established
- 1992
  - Irish Film Institute opens.
  - Dublin Institute of Technology established.
- 1994 – Eurovision Song Contest 1994 held.
- 1995 – Eurovision Song Contest 1995 held.
- 1996 – National Print Museum of Ireland opens.
- 1997 – Eurovision Song Contest 1997 held.

== 21st century ==
- 2001 – Dublin Corporation renamed Dublin City Council.
- 2002 – George's Quay Plaza built.
- 2003
  - Dublin International Film Festival begins.
  - Spire of Dublin erected.
  - James Joyce Bridge opens.
- 2004
  - Dublin Gay Theatre Festival begins.
  - Luas Green Line opens in June and Red Line in September.
- 2006 – Dublin Port Tunnel opens.
- 2009
  - Dublinbikes launched.
  - Samuel Beckett Bridge opens.
- 2010
  - Grand Canal Theatre and Convention Centre Dublin opens.
- 2011
  - Queen Elizabeth II's visit in May.
  - Barack Obama visits Ireland and speaks at College Green.
  - Population: 525,383.
- 2014 - Rosie Hackett Bridge opens.

== See also ==
- Cartography of Dublin
- History of Dublin
- List of mayors of Dublin

== Bibliography ==
=== Published in the 18th century ===
- Map of the City and Suburbs of Dublin, Charles Brooking, 1728
- Walter Harris (1766). History and Antiquities of the City of Dublin. Dublin: L. Flinn.
- William Wilson (1786). "Description of the City of Dublin". Post-Chaise Companion: or, Travellers' Directory through Ireland. Dublin. hdl:2027/mdp.39015077815960.
- John Ferrar (1796). A View of Ancient and Modern Dublin, with its Improvements to the Year 1796. Dublin.

=== Published in the 19th century ===
==== 1800s–1840s ====
- "Dublin", Kearsley's Traveller's Entertaining Guide through Great Britain, London: G. Kearsley, 1803
- Nathaniel Jefferys (1810). An Englishman's Descriptive Account of Dublin. London: Cadell and Davies.
- Rees, Abraham (1819), "Dublin", The Cyclopaedia, London: Longman, Hurst, Rees, Orme & Brown
- John James McGregor (1821). New Picture of Dublin. Dublin: C.P. Archer.
- G.N. Wright (1825), An Historical Guide to the City of Dublin (2nd ed.), London: London, Baldwin, Cradock, and Joy, OL 25580486M
- David Brewster, ed. (1830). "Dublin (metropolis)". Edinburgh Encyclopædia. Edinburgh: William Blackwood.
- "Dublin", Cities and Principal Towns of the World, Cabinet Cyclopaedia, London: Longman, Rees, Orme, Brown, & Green, 1830, OCLC 2665202
- M. Starrat (1830), History of Ancient and Modern Dublin, Dublin: J. Charles, OCLC 8029520, OL 19356155M
- Wilson's Dublin Directory, for the Year 1830. Dublin. 1830. + Historical Annals of the City of Dublin
- "Dublin", Leigh's New Pocket Road-book of Ireland (3rd ed.), London: Leigh & Son, 1835
- Owen Connellan (1845). "Annals of Dublin". Dublin Almanac and General Register of Ireland. Dublin: Pettigrew and Oulton. hdl:2027/mdp.39015074776223.
- John Thomson (1845), "Dublin", New Universal Gazetteer and Geographical Dictionary, London: H.G. Bohn
- "Dublin". Slater's National Commercial Directory of Ireland. Manchester: Isaac Slater. 1846.
- Edward Parry (1849), "Dublin and Environs", Railway Companion from Chester to Holyhead, Chester: T. Catherall, OCLC 7896287

==== 1850s–1890s ====
- "Dublin", Tourist's Illustrated Hand-Book for Ireland (3rd ed.), London: David Bryce, 1854
- James Fraser (1854), "Dublin City", Hand Book for Travellers in Ireland (4th ed.), Dublin: James McGlashan, OCLC 4904184
- Bradshaw (1860), "Dublin", Bradshaw's Descriptive Railway Hand-Book of Great Britain and Ireland
- Thomas O. Summers, ed. (1860), Dublin: an historical sketch of Ireland's metropolis, Nashville, Tennessee: Southern Methodist Publishing House, OCLC 42516682, OL 23663246M
- John Thomas Gilbert (1861), History of the City of Dublin, Dublin: James Duffy, OCLC 1988793 + v.2, v.3 + Index
- George Henry Townsend (1867), "Dublin", A Manual of Dates (2nd ed.), London: Frederick Warne & Co.
- William Henry Overall, ed. (1870), "Dublin", Dictionary of Chronology, London: William Tegg, OCLC 2613202
- John Parker Anderson (1881), "Dublin", Book of British Topography: a Classified Catalogue of the Topographical Works in the Library of the British Museum Relating to Great Britain and Ireland, London: W. Satchell
- R.M. Barrett, ed. (1884), Guide to Dublin Charities, Dublin: Hodges Figgis & Company
- W. Pembroke Fetridge (1885), "Dublin", Harper's Hand-Book for Travellers in Europe and the East (24th ed.), New York: Harper & Brothers
- "Dublin", Appletons' European Guide Book, New York: D. Appleton & Co., 1886
- Dublin, Cork, and South of Ireland: A Literary, Commercial, and Social Review, London: Stratten & Stratten, 1892
- Ephraim MacDowel Cosgrave; Leonard R. Strangways (1895), Dictionary of Dublin, Dublin: Sealy, Bryers & Walker, OCLC 9866024, OL 7042634M

=== Published in the 20th century ===
==== 1900s–1940s ====
- "Dublin", Chambers's Encyclopaedia, London: W. & R. Chambers, 1901
- G.K. Fortescue, ed. (1902). "Dublin (City)". Subject Index of the Modern Works Added to the Library of the British Museum in the Years 1881–1900. London: The Trustees. hdl:2027/uc1.b5107011.
- "Topography: Dublin", List of works relating to Ireland, New York: New York Public Library, 1905, OCLC 29094144
- E. D. Jordan (1906), "Dublin", Black's Guide to Ireland (24th ed.), London: Adam and Charles Black
- John Cooke (1906), "Dublin", Handbook for Travellers in Ireland (7th ed.), London: Edward Stanford
- Handbook to the City of Dublin and the Surrounding District, British Association for the Advancement of Science, 1908, OCLC 1616720, OL 13505672M
- M. J. B. Baddeley (1909), "Dublin", Northern Counties including Dublin and Neighbourhood, Ireland (6th ed.), London: T. Nelson and Sons, OCLC 4605342
- "Dublin (city)" . Encyclopædia Britannica. Vol. 8 (11th ed.). 1910. pp. 618–623.
- "Dublin (City)". List of Works Relating to British Genealogy and Local History. New York: New York Public Library. 1910.
- Benjamin Vincent (1910), "Dublin", Haydn's Dictionary of Dates (25th ed.), London: Ward, Lock & Co.
- Samuel Carter Hall; Anna Maria Hall (1911), "Dublin", Ireland: its Scenery, Character and History, vol. 4, Boston: Niccolls, OCLC 3567745
- Esther Singleton (1913), "City of Dublin", Great Cities of Europe, Garden City, N.Y.: Doubleday, Page
- James Collins (1913), Life in Old Dublin, Dublin: J. Duffy, OCLC 4310334, OL 6600535M
- Stephen Lucius Gwynn (1915), "Dublin", Famous Cities of Ireland, Dublin: Maunsel & Co., OCLC 4759563
- Pictorial and Descriptive Guide to Dublin and the Wicklow Tours (20th ed.), London: Ward, Lock and Company, 1919, OCLC 8105082, OL 23663882M
- Lucien E. Taylor, ed. (1921). "History: Local History and Description". List of Books on Modern Ireland in the Public Library of the City of Boston. Boston, Massachusetts: Boston Public Library. hdl:2027/mdp.39015033681407.
- Bulmer Hobson (1930). A Book of Dublin (2nd ed.). Dublin: Kevin J. Kenny.

==== 1950s–1990s ====
- Maurice James Craig (1952), Dublin, 1660–1860, London: Cresset Press, OCLC 3304156
- Dublin, Great Cities, Time-Life Books, 1978, OL 4483796M
- Mary E. Daly (1984), Dublin, the Deposed Capital: a Social and Economic History, 1860–1914, Cork, Ireland: Cork University Press, ISBN 0-902561-27-8
- Kearns, Kevin C. (1991). Dublin Street Life and Lore: an Oral History.
- Kearns, Kevin C. (1994). Dublin Tenement Life: an Oral History.
- "Dublin". Ireland. Let's Go. 1995. p. 61+. ISBN 978-0-312-11302-5. OL 24212350M.
- Kevin C. Kearns (1996). Dublin Pub Life and Lore: an Oral History.

=== Published in the 21st century ===
- Annemarie Piso (2003), "Unionisation in the Dublin hotel industry", International Journal of Tourism Research, vol. 5
- Mary Clark (2006). "Dublin City Archives and Its Collections". Dublin Historical Record. 59 (1). Old Dublin Society: 20–27. JSTOR 30101603.
- Juliana Adelman (2009), "Animal Knowledge: Zoology and Class-ification in Nineteenth-Century Dublin", Field Day Review, vol. 5, pp. 108–121, JSTOR 25664529
- Mairtin Mac Con Iomaire (2011), "Culinary voices: perspectives from Dublin restaurants", Oral History, vol. 39, no. 1, pp. 77–90, JSTOR 25802217
