= History of Dublin =

Timeline of Dublin
Historical affiliations

Kingdom of Leinster, pre 841
Kingdom of Dublin, 841–902
Kingdom of Leinster, 902–917
Kingdom of Dublin, 917–1170
Lordship of Ireland, 1170−1542
Kingdom of Ireland, 1542−1649
Commonwealth of England, Scotland and Ireland, 1649−1660
Kingdom of Ireland, 1660–1800
United Kingdom of Great Britain and Ireland, 1801–1922
Irish Free State, 1922–1937
Republic of Ireland, 1937–present

The city of Dublin can trace its origin back more than 1,000 years, and for much of this time it has been Ireland's principal city and the cultural, educational and industrial centre of the island.

== Founding and early history ==
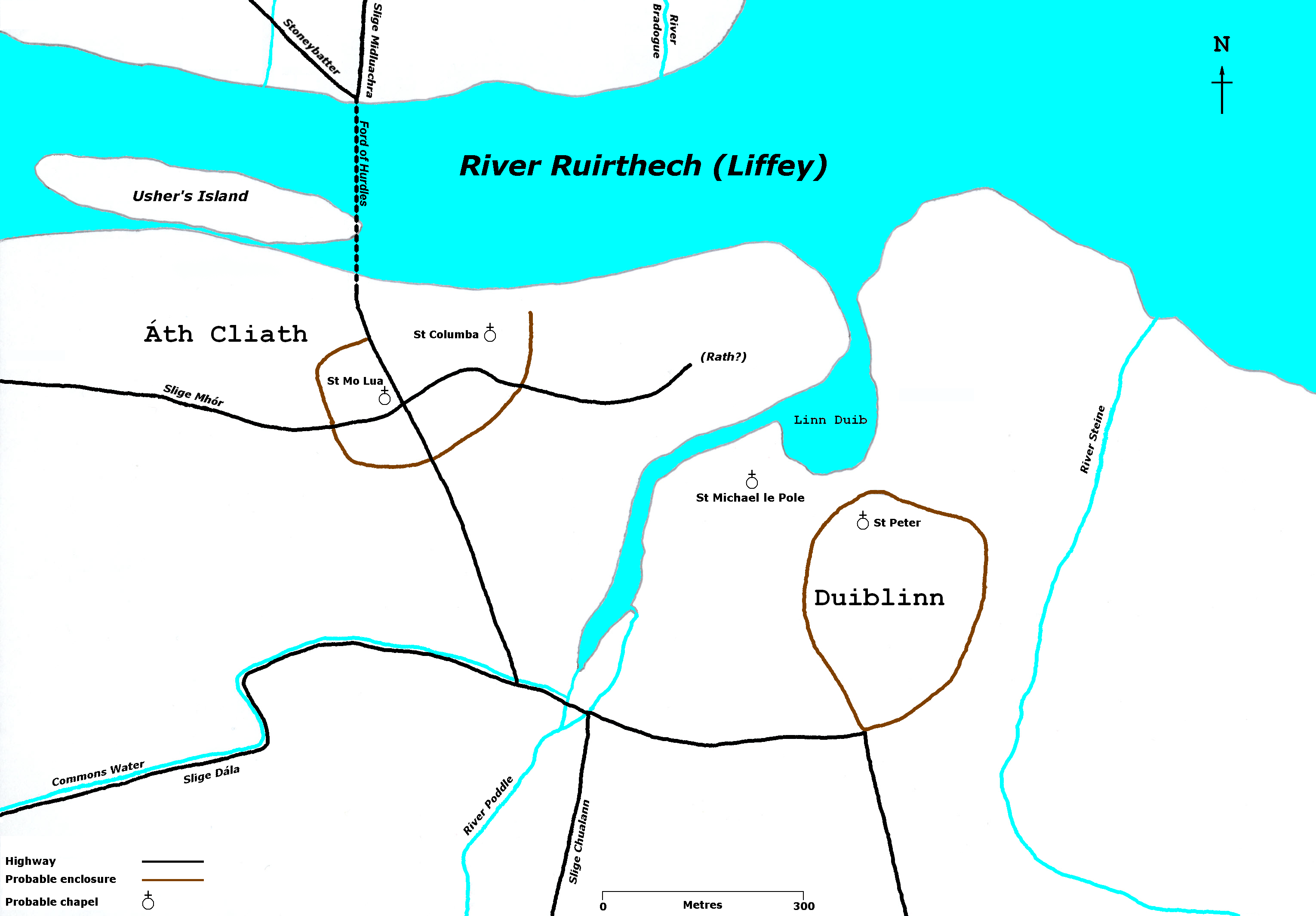
The Dublin area c. 800

The earliest reference to Dublin is sometimes said to be found in the writings of Claudius Ptolemaeus (Ptolemy), the Egyptian-Greek astronomer and cartographer, around the year 140, who refers to a settlement called Eblana. This would seem to give Dublin a just claim to nearly two thousand years of antiquity, as the settlement must have existed a considerable time before Ptolemy became aware of it. Recently, however, doubt has been cast on the identification of Eblana with Dublin, and the similarity of the two names is now thought to be coincidental.

Beginning in the 9th and 10th centuries, there were two settlements where the modern city stands. The Viking settlement of about 841 was known as Dyflin, from the Irish Duiblinn ("black pool"), which also led to the modern English name. This referred to a dark tidal pool where the River Poddle entered the Liffey on the site of the Castle Gardens at the rear of Dublin Castle. The Gaelic settlement, Áth Cliath ("ford of hurdles") was further upriver, at the site of the present day Father Mathew Bridge at the bottom of Church Street. The Celtic settlement's name is still used as the Irish name of the modern city. However, the first written evidence of it is found in the Annals of Ulster of 1368.

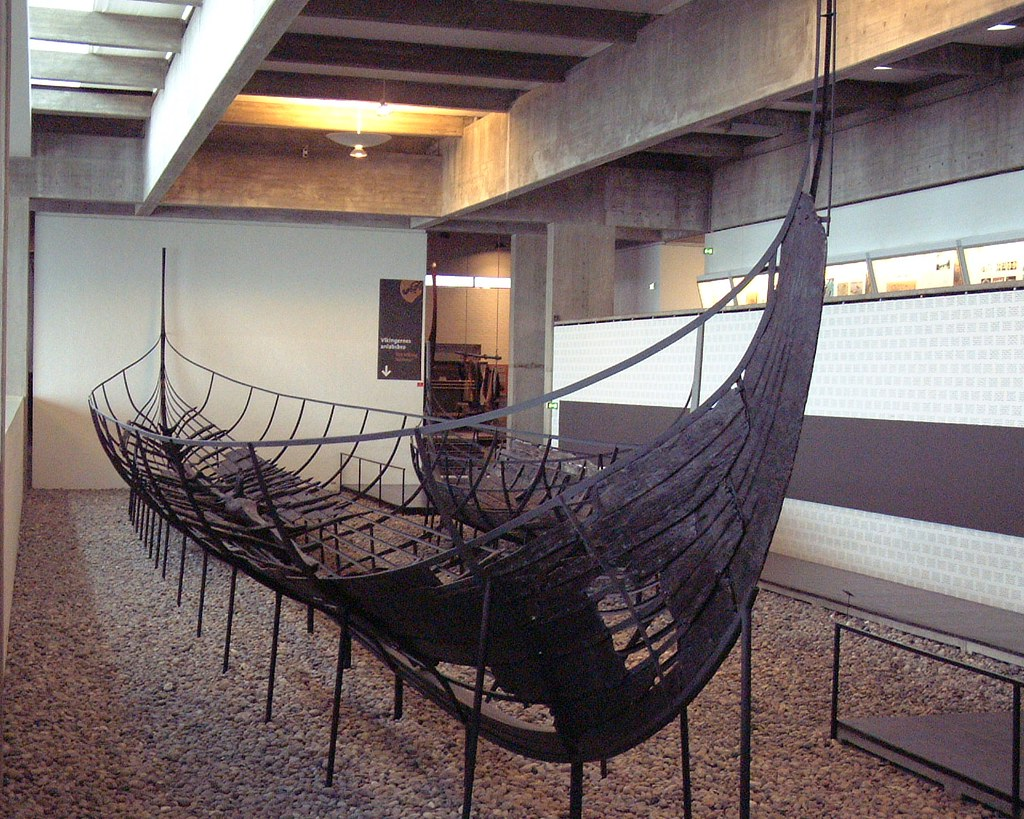
Skudelev II, a large Viking Age warship built in the Dublin area c. 1042

The Vikings, or Ostmen (East-men) as they called themselves, ruled Dublin for almost three centuries, although they were expelled in 902 only to return in 917. The Thingmote was a raised mound, 40-foot (12 m) high and 240-foot (73 m) in circumference, where the Norsemen assembled and made their laws. It stood on the south side of the river, adjacent to Dublin Castle, until 1685. Viking Dublin also had a large slave market. Thralls were captured and sold, not only by the Norse but also by warring Irish chiefs.^{b}

Dublin celebrated its millennium in 1988 with the slogan "Dublin's Great in '88". Even though the city is far older than that, the rationale was that 988 was the year in which the Norse King Glun Iarainn recognised Máel Sechnaill II (Máel Sechnaill Mór), High King of Ireland, and agreed to pay taxes and accept Brehon Law.^{a} That date was celebrated, but might not have been accurate, for it was in 989 (not 988) that Mael Seachnaill laid siege to the city for 20 nights and captured it.

After the defeat of the Norse by the Irish High King Brian Boru at the Battle of Clontarf on 23 April 1014, the Norse were a minor political force in Ireland, firmly opting for commercial life. Viking rule of Dublin would end completely in 1171 when the city was captured by King Diarmait mac Murchada of Leinster, with the aid of Cambro-Norman mercenaries. The last Norse King of Dublin, Ascall mac Ragnaill, tried to recapture the city with an army he had raised among his relations in the Scottish Highlands, where he had fled after the city was taken. The attempted reconquest failed: Ascall was captured as he tried to escape; on 16 May 1171, he was beheaded.

== Late medieval Dublin ==
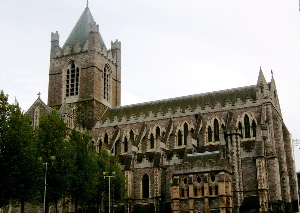
Christ Church Cathedral (exterior)

Diarmait mac Murchada's rule was brief, as he died in May 1171. Leadership of Leinster and Dublin was assumed by his Norman son-in-law Richard de Clare ("Strongbow"). Diarmait had designated that Strongbow would succeed him as part of their military alliance and marriage agreement, but this was contested by Diarmait's son Domhnall and other Irish kings and leaders. Eventually, Henry II invaded Ireland himself to ensure that the Normans served in fief to him and would never consider separating from English rule. As a result of the Anglo-Norman invasion of southern Ireland, Dublin became the centre of English power on the island, replacing Tara in Meath, which had been the seat of the Gaelic High Kings of Ireland.

After the Anglo-Normans took Dublin in 1171, many of the city's Norse inhabitants left the old city, which was on the south side of the river Liffey and built their own settlement on the north side, known as Ostmantown or "Oxmantown". Dublin became the capital of the English Lordship of Ireland when it was established in 1177, and County Dublin was the first county in Ireland to be shired in the 1190s. Important buildings constructed during this time include Christ Church Cathedral (1180s), St. Audoen's Church (1190), and St Patrick's Cathedral (1191), all of which are within a kilometre of one another. On 15 May 1192, Dublin's first written Charter of Liberties was granted by John, at that time Lord of Ireland, and it was addressed to all his "French, English, Irish and Welsh subjects and friends". On Easter Monday in 1209, an event that became known as Black Monday occurred when a clan of native Gaelic O'Byrnes ambushed and killed approximately 500 newly arrived settlers from Bristol outside Dublin's city walls at Ranelagh. On 15 June 1229, John's son Henry III granted the citizens the right to elect a mayor who was to be assisted by two provosts. In Dublin itself, English rule was centred on Dublin Castle. The city was also the main seat of the Parliament of Ireland from 1297, which was composed of landowners and merchants.

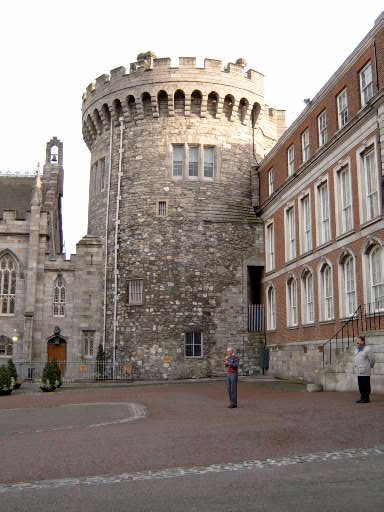
One of the surviving medieval towers at Dublin Castle. To its left is the Chapel Royal.

In 1315, a Scottish army under Edward the Bruce burned the city's suburbs. In 1348, the city was hit by the Black Death, a lethal bubonic plague that ravaged Europe in the mid-14th century. In Dublin, victims of the disease were buried in mass graves in an area still known as "Blackpitts". However, archaeological excavations have found evidence of a tanning industry in this area, and so the name "Blackpitts" could refer to the tanning pits which stained the surrounding area a deep dark colour. The plague recurred regularly in the city until its last major outbreak in 1649.

By 1400, many of the descendants of the Anglo-Norman conquerors had become absorbed into the Gaelic culture, adopting the Irish language and customs. Meanwhile, Dublin was becoming extensively populated with settlers from England and Wales, and the rural area around the city, as far north as Drogheda, also saw extensive English settlement. Eventually, this was the only region of the Lordship that was effectively controlled by the English, and it became known as The Pale due to fencing and other fortifications built to protect these settlers from the native Irish. The inhabitants of The Pale eventually developed an identity similar to that of other settler-colonists of a beleaguered enclave of civilisation surrounded by "barbarous natives". The siege mentality of medieval Dubliners is best illustrated by their annual pilgrimage to the area called Fiodh Chuilinn, or Holly Wood (rendered in English as Cullenswood) in Ranelagh, where, in 1209, five hundred recent settlers from Bristol had been massacred by the O'Toole clan during an outing outside the city limits. Every year on "Black Monday", the Dublin citizens would march out of the city to the spot where the atrocity had happened and raise a black banner in the direction of the mountains to challenge the Irish to battle in a gesture of symbolic defiance. This was still so dangerous that, until the 17th century, the participants had to be guarded by the city militia and a stockade against "the mountain enemy". It has also been reported that throughout the Middle Ages, the city paid tribute, protection money, or "black rent" to the neighbouring Irish clans to avoid their predatory raids.

Medieval Dublin was a tightly knit place of around 5,000 to 10,000 people, intimate enough for every newly married citizen to be escorted by the mayor to the city bullring to kiss the enclosure for good luck. It was also very small in area, an enclave hugging the south side of the Liffey of no more than three square kilometres. Outside the city walls were suburbs such as the Liberties, on the lands of the Archbishop of Dublin, and Irishtown, where Gaelic Irish were supposed to live, having been expelled from the city proper by a 15th-century law. Although the native Irish were not supposed to live in the city and its environs, many did so, and by the 16th century, English accounts complained that Irish was starting to rival English as the everyday language of The Pale.

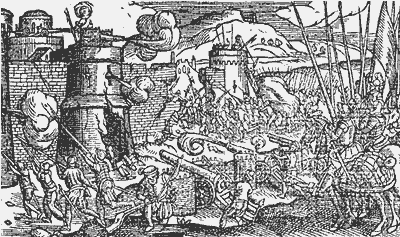
Siege of Dublin, 1535. The Earl of Kildare's attempt to seize control of Ireland reignited English interest in the island.

As English interest in maintaining their Irish colony waned, the defence of Dublin from the surrounding Irish was left to the Fitzgerald Earls of Kildare, who dominated Irish politics until the 16th century. However, this dynasty often pursued its own agenda. In 1487, during the English Wars of the Roses, the Fitzgeralds occupied Dublin with the aid of troops from the Duchy of Burgundy and proclaimed the Yorkist Lambert Simnel to be King of England. In 1537, the same dynasty, led by Silken Thomas, besieged Dublin Castle because they were angry at the imprisonment of Gerald Fitzgerald, 9th Earl of Kildare. Henry VIII sent a large army to subdue the Fitzgeralds and replace them with English administrators. This was the beginning of a much closer, though not always happy, relationship between Dublin and the English Crown.

== 16th and 17th centuries ==
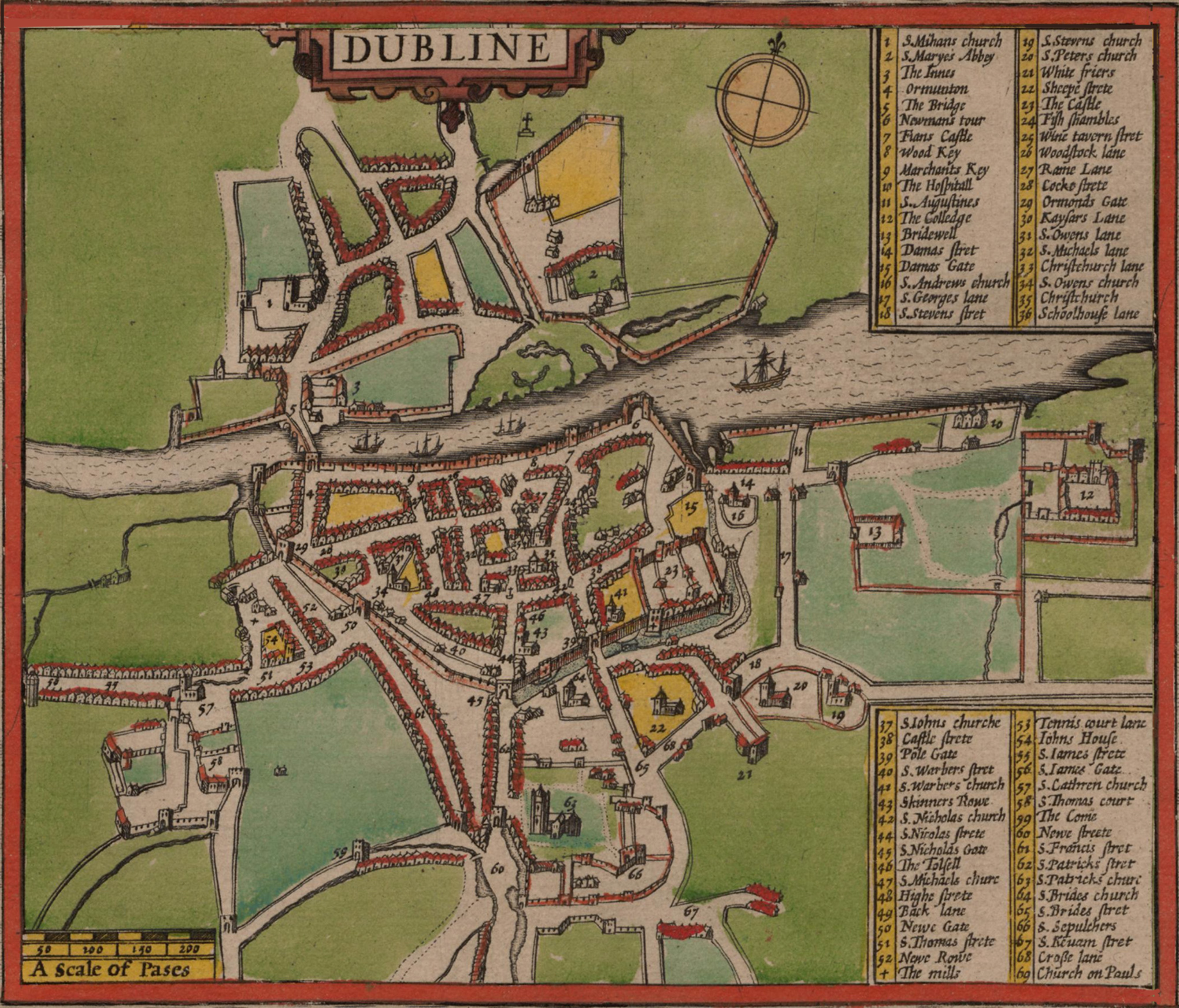
Dublin in 1610 – reprint of 1896

While the "Old English" community of Dublin and the Pale were satisfied with the thorough English conquest of the whole island under the Tudor dynasty and disarmament of the native Irish, they were deeply alienated by the Protestant reformation that had taken place in England, as they were almost all Roman Catholics. In addition, they were angered by being forced to pay for the English garrisons of the country through an extra-parliamentary tax known as the "cess". Several Dubliners were executed for taking part in the Second Desmond Rebellion in the 1580s. The Mayoress of Dublin, Margaret Ball, died in captivity in Dublin Castle for her Catholic sympathies in 1584, and Dermot O'Hurley, a Catholic Archbishop, was hanged outside the city walls in the same year.

In 1592, Elizabeth I opened Trinity College Dublin (located at that time outside the city walls on its eastern side) as a Protestant University for the Irish gentry. However, the important Dublin families spurned it and sent their sons instead to Catholic Universities in continental Europe.

The Dublin community's discontent was deepened by the events of the Nine Years War of the 1590s, when English soldiers were required by decree to be housed by the townsmen of Dublin, and they spread disease and forced up the price of food. The wounded lay in stalls in the streets, in the absence of a proper hospital. To compound disaffection in the city, the English Army's gunpowder store on Winetavern Street exploded accidentally in 1597, killing nearly 200 Dubliners. The Pale community, however dissatisfied they were with the English government, remained hostile to the Gaelic Irish led by Hugh O'Neill.

As a result of these tensions, the English authorities came to see Dubliners as unreliable and encouraged the settlement there of Protestants from England. These "New English" became the basis of the English administration in Ireland until the 19th century.

Protestants became a majority in Dublin in the 1640s when thousands of them fled there to escape the Irish Rebellion of 1641. When the city was subsequently threatened by Irish Catholic forces, the Catholic Dubliners were expelled from the city by its English garrison. In the 1640s, the city was besieged twice during the Irish Confederate Wars, in 1646 and 1649. However, on both occasions, the attackers were driven off before a lengthy siege could develop.

In 1649, on the second of these occasions, a mixed force of Irish Confederates and Anglo-Irish Royalists was routed by Dublin's English Parliamentarian garrison in the Battle of Rathmines, fought on the city's southern outskirts.

In the 1650s, after the Cromwellian conquest of Ireland, Catholics were banned from dwelling within the city limits under the vengeful Cromwellian settlement but this law was not strictly enforced. Ultimately, this religious discrimination led to the Old English community abandoning their English roots and coming to see themselves as part of the native Irish community.

Under the Restoration, James Butler, 1st Duke of Ormond, at that time the Lord Deputy of Ireland, made the first step toward modernising Dublin by ordering that the houses along the river Liffey had to face the river and have high-quality frontages. This was in contrast to the earlier period, when Dublin homes faced away from the river, often using it for waste disposal.

By the end of the seventeenth century, Dublin was the capital of the English-run Kingdom of Ireland – ruled by the Protestant "New English" minority. Dublin was one of the few parts of Ireland in 1700 (along with some areas of Ulster) where Protestants were a majority. In the next century, Dublin would become larger, more peaceful, and more prosperous than at any time in its previous history.

== 18th and 19th centuries ==
=== From a medieval to a Georgian city ===
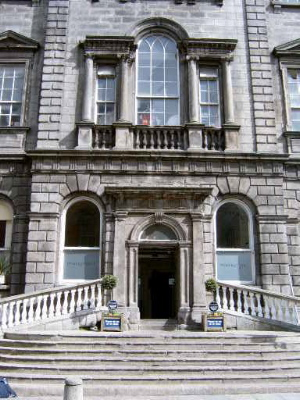
Powerscourt House: Dublin residence of Viscount Powerscourt. In the 1980s, it was converted into a shopping centre. Note the Powerscourt Georgian ceiling and interior Georgian door.

By the beginning of the 18th century, the English had established control and imposed the harsh Penal Laws on the Catholic majority of Ireland's population. In Dublin, however, the Protestant Ascendancy was thriving, and the city expanded rapidly from the 17th century onward. By 1700, the population had surpassed 60,000, making it the second largest city, after London, in the British Empire.

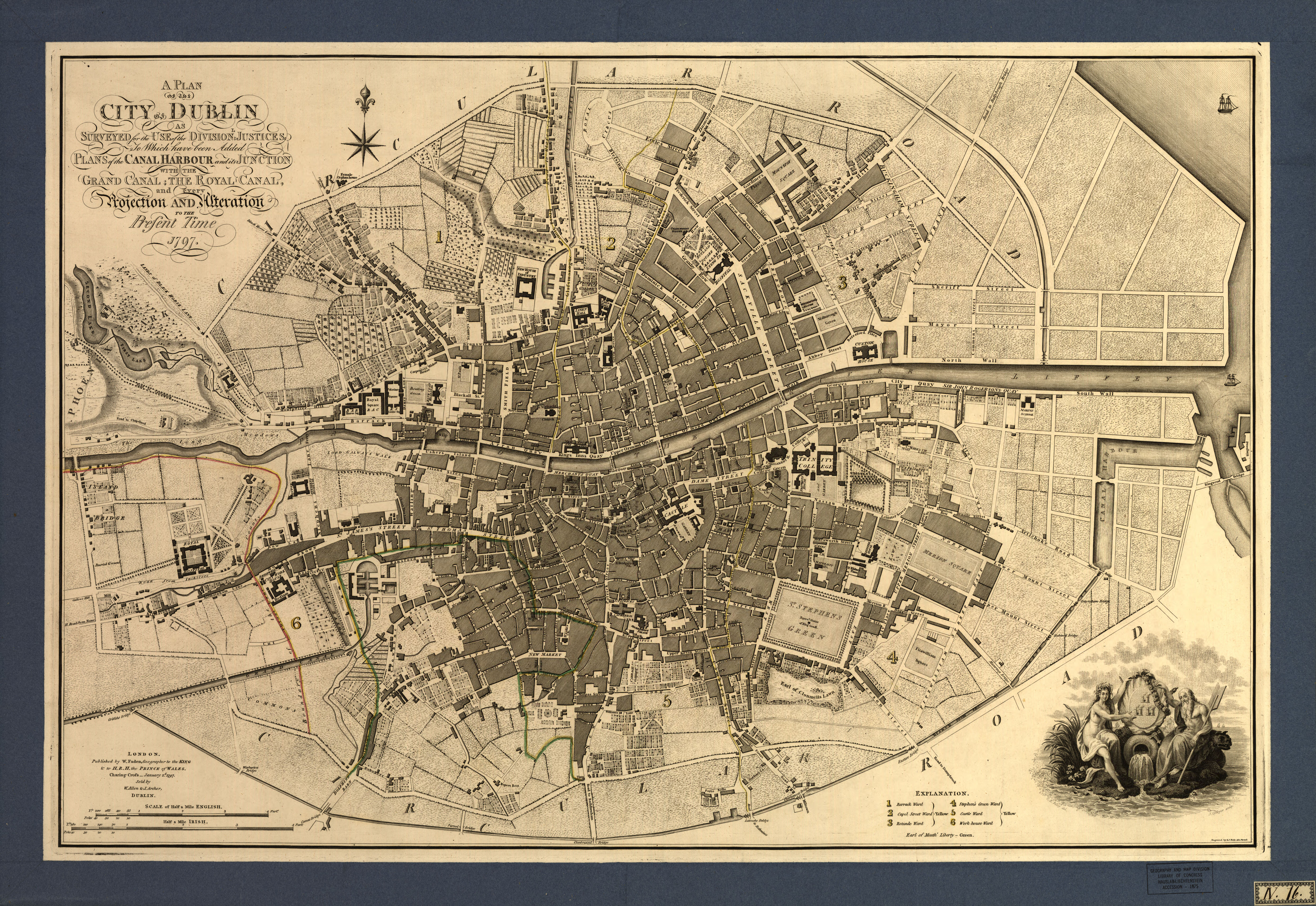
1797 map of Dublin

Many of the city's notable Georgian buildings and street scape schemes were built during the 18th century. In terms of street layout, at the beginning of the 18th century, Dublin was a medieval city akin to Paris. Over the course of the 18th century (as Paris would in the 19th century), Dublin underwent a major rebuilding, with the Wide Streets Commission demolishing many of the narrow medieval streets and replacing them with large Georgian streets. Among the notable streets to appear following this redesign were Sackville Street (now called O'Connell Street), Dame Street, Westmoreland Street, and D'Olier Street. Five major Georgian squares were also laid out: Rutland Square (now called Parnell Square) and Mountjoy Square on the northside of the River Liffey, and Merrion Square, Fitzwilliam Square, and Saint Stephen's Green on the southside. Initially, the most prosperous residences of peers were located on the northside, on places like Henrietta Street and Rutland Square. However the decision of the Earl of Kildare (Ireland's premier peer, later made Duke of Leinster), to build his new townhouse, Kildare House (later renamed Leinster House) on the southside led to a rush from peers to also build new houses on the southside, on or around the three major southern squares.

In 1745 Jonathan Swift, then Dean of St. Patrick's Cathedral, bequeathed his entire estate to found a hospital for "fools and mad" and on 8 August 1746, a Royal Charter was granted to St Patrick's Hospital by George II. Following his experiences as a governor of the Bedlam hospital in London, Swift intended that the hospital be designed around the needs of the patients and left instructions on how they were to be treated. The first psychiatric hospital to be built in Ireland, it is one of the oldest in the world and remains one of Ireland's leading mental health institutions.

Historical population
Year	Pop.	±%
1510	6,443	—
1550	6,771	+5.1%
1580	7,003	+3.4%
1585	5,833	−16.7%
1600	7,532	+29.1%
1610	6,266	−16.8%
1613	6,020	−3.9%
1616	5,913	−1.8%
1621	5,888	−0.4%
1631	5,714	−3.0%
1641	5,888	+3.0%
1651	6,024	+2.3%
1653	6,133	+1.8%
1659	8,780	+43.2%
1695	47,000	+435.3%
1715	89,000	+89.4%
1733	123,000	+38.2%
1760	141,000	+14.6%
1778	154,000	+9.2%
1798	180,000	+16.9%
1813	176,610	−1.9%

Historical population
Year	Pop.	±%
1821	186,276	—
1831	232,362	+24.7%
1841	233,726	+0.6%
1851	254,810	+9.0%
1861	263,751	+3.5%
1871	267,717	+1.5%
1881	349,583	+30.6%
1891	352,541	+0.8%
1901	290,638	−17.6%
1911	304,802	+4.9%
1926	404,094	+32.6%
1936	472,912	+17.0%
1946	506,051	+7.0%
1951	580,388	+14.7%
1956	584,483	+0.7%
1961	537,448	−8.0%
1966	588,773	+9.5%
1971	567,866	−3.6%
1979	544,586	−4.1%
1981	525,882	−3.4%
1986	502,749	−4.4%
1991	478,389	−4.8%
1996	481,854	+0.7%
2002	495,101	+2.7%
2006	506,211	+2.2%
2011	525,383	+3.8%
2016	553,165	+5.3%
2022	588,233	+6.3%

For all of its Enlightenment sophistication in fields such as architecture and music (Handel's "Messiah" was first performed on Fishamble Street), 18th-century Dublin remained decidedly rough around the edges. Its slum population rapidly increased as a result of the mounting rural migration to the city and was located mostly in the north and southwest quarters of the city. Rival gangs known as the "Liberty Boys", mostly Protestant weavers from the Liberties, and the "Ormonde Boys", Catholic butchers from Ormonde Market on the northside, fought bloody street battles with each other, sometimes heavily armed and with numerous fatalities. It was also common for the Dublin crowds to hold violent demonstrations outside the Irish Parliament when the members passed unpopular laws. In 1713, the Dublin election riot occurred during a disputed vote as part of the Irish General Election.

One of the effects of continued rural migration to Dublin was that its demographic balance was again altered, Catholics becoming the majority in the city again in the late 18th century.

=== Rebellion, Union and Catholic Emancipation ===
Until 1800, the city housed the Parliament of Ireland. While parliament was independent, both houses were the exclusive preserve of planters or "Old English" aristocracy. By the late 18th century, the Ascendancy class of Irish Protestants – who were mostly descendants of British settlers – came to regard Ireland as their native country. This 'Patriot Parliament' successfully agitated at Westminster for increased autonomy and better terms of trade with Great Britain and the Colonies. From 1778, the Penal Laws, which discriminated against Roman Catholics in many areas of life, were gradually repealed, pushed along by liberals such as Henry Grattan. (See Ireland 1691–1801)

However, under the influence of the American and French revolutions, some Irish radicals went a step further and formed the United Irishmen to create an independent, non-sectarian, and democratic republic. United Irish leaders in Dublin included Napper Tandy, Oliver Bond, and Edward Fitzgerald. Wolfe Tone, the leader of the movement, was also from Dublin. The United Irishmen planned to take Dublin in a street rising in 1798, but their leaders were arrested, and the city was occupied by a large British military presence shortly before the rebels could assemble. There was some local fighting in the city's outskirts, such as in Rathfarnham, but the city itself remained firmly under control during the 1798 rebellion.

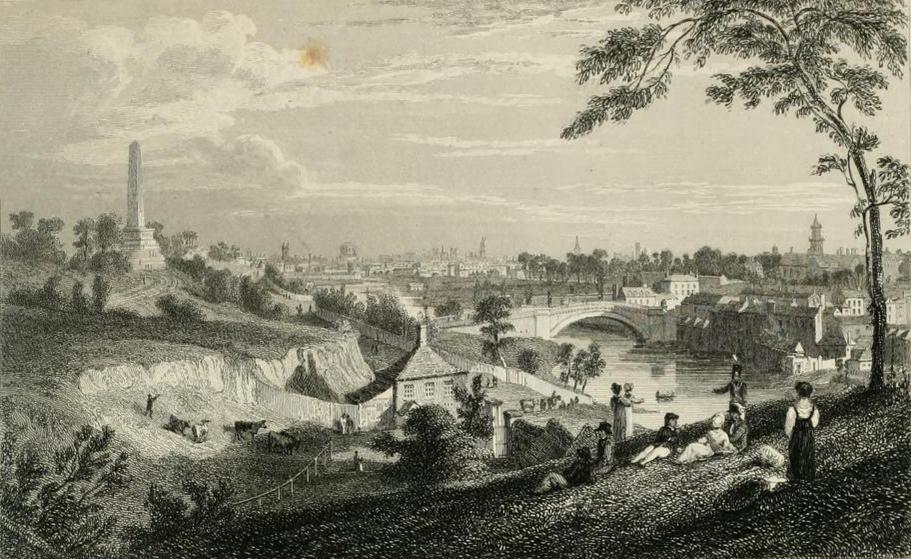
Dublin c. 1831 (from the Phoenix Park)

The Protestant Ascendancy was shocked by the events of the 1790s, as was the British government. In response, the Irish Act of Union was passed in 1800, merging the Kingdom of Ireland with the Kingdom of Great Britain to form the United Kingdom of Great Britain and Ireland. In doing this, the Irish Parliament voted itself out of existence, and Dublin lost its political status as a capital.

Though the city's growth continued, it suffered financially from the loss of parliament and more directly from the loss of income that accompanied the arrival of hundreds of peers and MPs and thousands of servants for sessions of parliament and the social season of the viceregal court in Dublin Castle. Within a short few years, many of the finest mansions, including Leinster House, Powerscourt House, and Aldborough House, once owned by peers who spent much of their year in the capital, were for sale. Many of the city's once elegant Georgian neighbourhoods rapidly became slums. In 1803, Robert Emmet, the brother of one of the United Irish leaders, launched a one-day rebellion in the city. It was put down easily, however, and Emmet was hanged, drawn, and quartered.

In 1829, the wealthier Irish Catholics recovered full citizenship within the United Kingdom. This was partly as a result of agitation by Daniel O'Connell, who organised mass rallies for Catholic Emancipation in Dublin, among other places.

In 1840, Thomas Drummond, the Liberal Under-Secretary for Ireland, passed the Corporation Act, which totally reformed local government in Ireland. In Dublin, this meant that the old franchise system, based on Protestant property holders and guild members, was abolished, and the right to vote within the Dublin Corporation was granted to all property holders of over ten pounds per year. This also meant that Catholics, having been excluded from municipal government since the 1690s, became a 2–1 majority in the electorate. As a result, Daniel O'Connell was elected mayor in 1841, the first elections held with the new franchise.

O'Connell also campaigned unsuccessfully for a restoration of Irish legislative autonomy or Repeal of the Union. He organised mass rallies known as "Monster Meetings" to pressure the British government to concede the return of the Irish Parliament, abolished in 1801 under the Act of Union, to Dublin. The climax of his campaign was supposed to be a rally at Clontarf, just north of the city, which was chosen for its symbolic importance due to the Battle of Clontarf in 1014. Hundreds of thousands of people were expected to attend the meeting, but the British government banned it and sent in troops to suppress it. O'Connell backed down, and his movement split and lost momentum. O'Connell is also remembered among trade unionists in the city to this day for calling on the British army to suppress a strike during his tenure.

=== Late 19th century ===
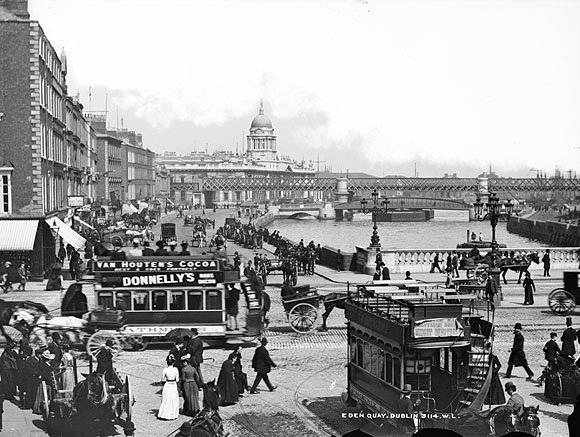
Corner of Eden Quay and O'Connell Bridge, 1897

After Emancipation and with the gradual extension of the right to vote in British politics, Irish nationalists (mainly Catholics) gained control of Dublin's government with the reform of local government in 1840, Daniel O'Connell being the first Catholic Mayor in 150 years. Increasing wealth prompted many of Dublin's Protestant and Unionist middle classes to move out of the city proper to new suburbs such as Ballsbridge, Rathmines and Rathgar – which are still distinguished by their graceful Victorian architecture. A new railway also connected Dublin with the middle-class suburb of Dún Laoghaire, renamed Kingstown in 1821.

Dublin, unlike Belfast in the north, did not experience the full effect of the Industrial Revolution and as a result, the number of unskilled unemployed was always high in the city. Industries like the Guinness brewery, Jameson Distillery, and Jacob's biscuit factory provided the most stable employment. New working-class suburbs grew up in Kilmainham and Inchicore around them. Another major employer was the Dublin tramways system, run by a private company – the Dublin United Tramway Company.^{c} By 1900, Belfast had a larger population than Dublin, though it is smaller today.

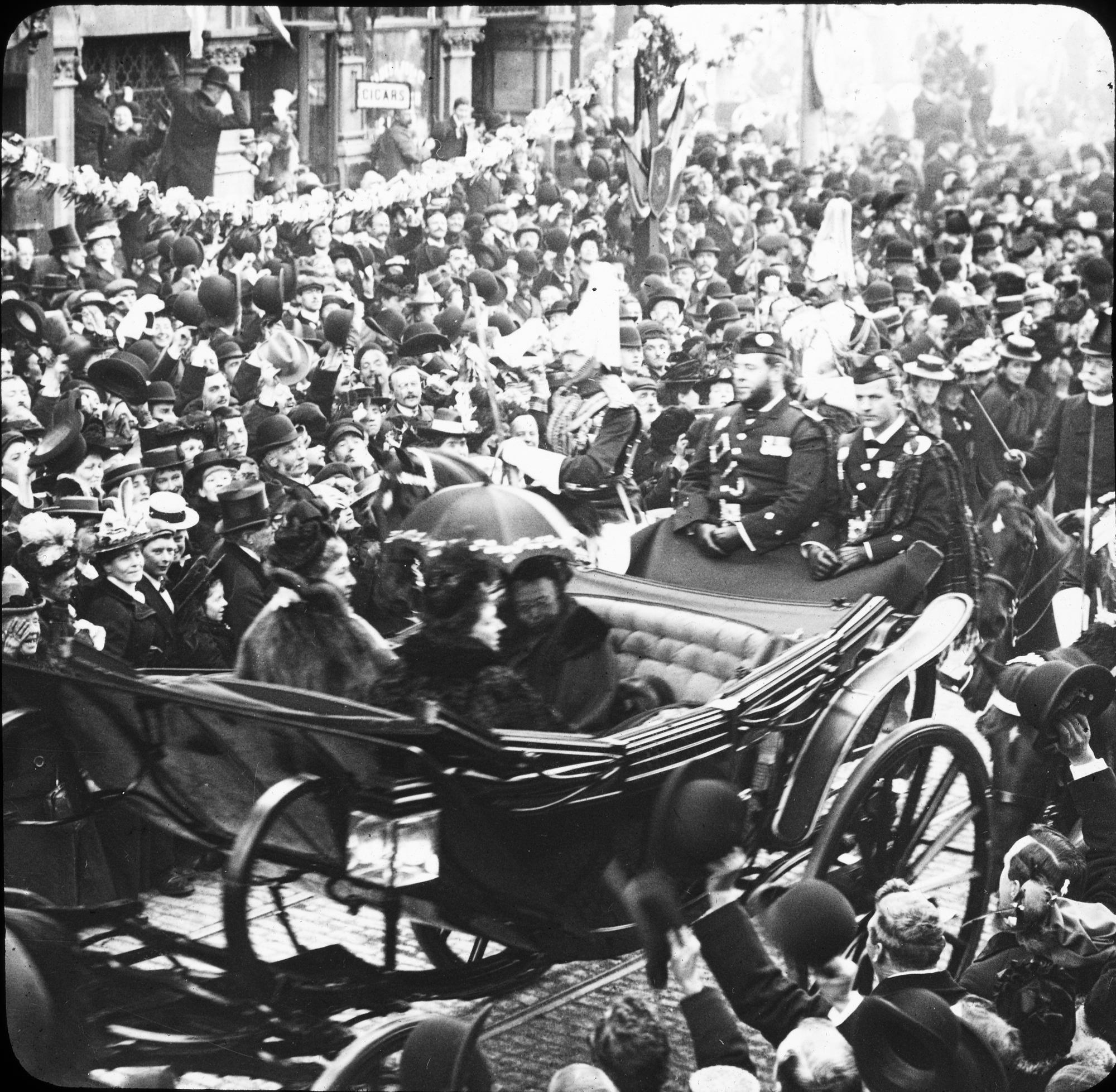
Queen Victoria in Dublin

In 1867, the Irish Republican Brotherhood or 'Fenians', attempted an insurrection aimed at the ending of British rule in Ireland. However, the rebellion was badly organised and failed to get off the ground. In Dublin, fighting was confined to the suburb of Tallaght. Several thousand Fenians (estimated at between 4–8,000 men) marched out to Tallaght Hill, and some fought a brief skirmish with the police at the Royal Irish Constabulary barracks in Tallaght. However, due to poor leadership and unclear plans, they dispersed shortly thereafter, and several hundred were arrested. The failure of this rebellion did not mark the end of nationalist violence, however. An attempt to free three Fenian prisoners in Manchester killed a guard, for which three Fenians were hanged. Dublin saw mass demonstrations in solidarity with those executed and an amnesty campaign for the other Fenian prisoners.

In 1882, an offshoot of the Fenians, who called themselves the Irish National Invincibles, assassinated two prominent members of the British administration with surgical knives in the Phoenix Park, in reprisal for the introduction of Coercion Acts against the Land League and the RIC killing of two demonstrators in County Mayo. The incident became known as the Phoenix Park killings and was universally condemned.

Under the 1898 Local Government Act, the electorate of the Dublin Corporation was expanded to include all rate payers. Greater powers of administration were also devolved to local government, as part of a political strategy by the Conservative Party of "killing Home Rule with kindness", or placating Irish nationalist grievances.

== Early 20th century ==
=== Monto ===
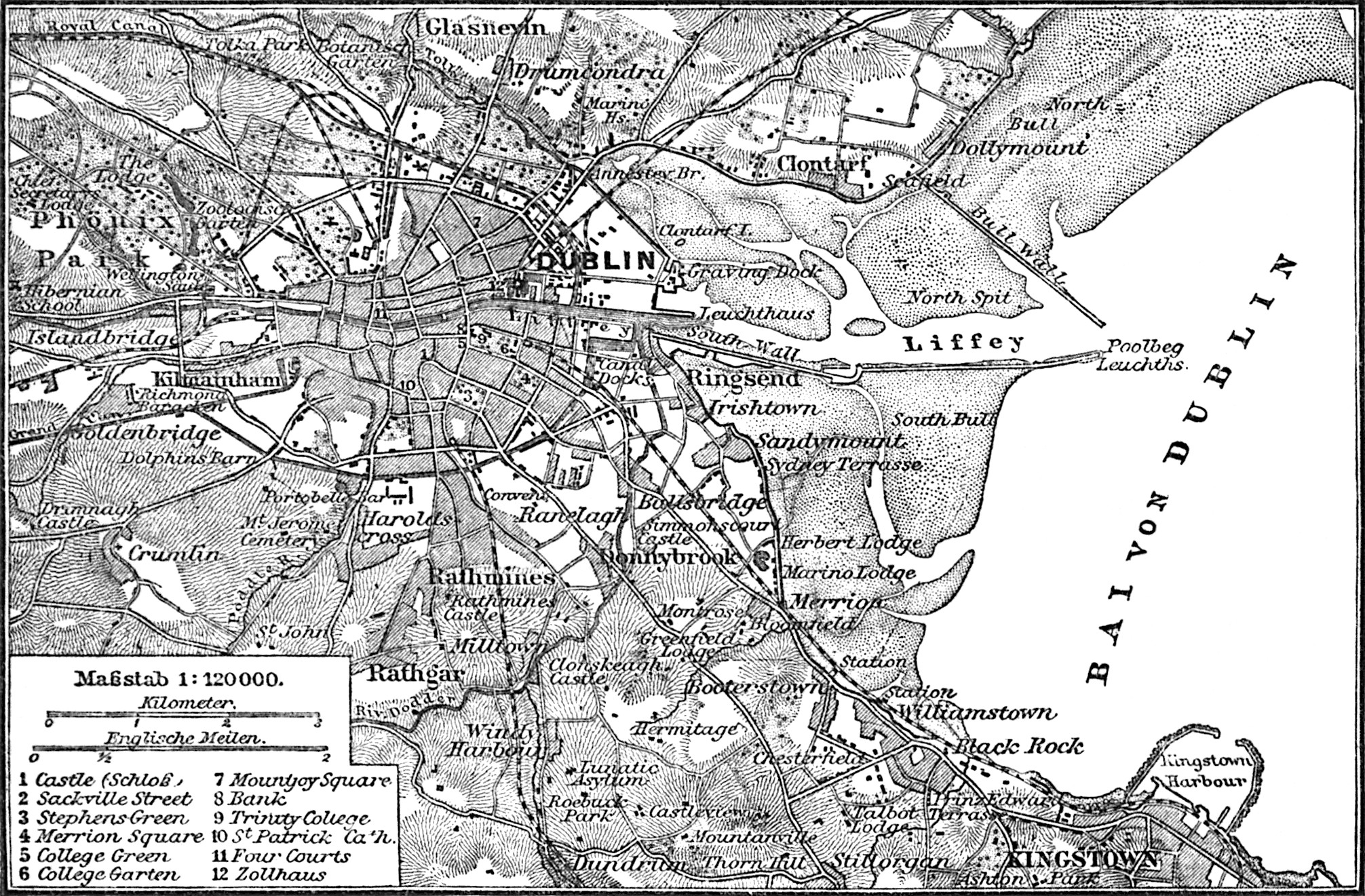
1890 German map of Dublin

Although Dublin declined in terms of wealth and importance after the Act of Union, it grew steadily in size throughout the 19th century. By 1900, the population was over 400,000. While the city grew, so did its level of poverty. Though described as "the second city of the (British) Empire", its large number of tenements became infamous, being mentioned by writers such as James Joyce. An area called Monto (in or around Montgomery Street off Sackville Street) became infamous also as the British Empire's biggest red-light district, its financial viability aided by the number of British Army barracks and hence soldiers in the city, notably the Royal Barracks (later Collins Barracks and now one of the locations of Ireland's National Museum). Monto finally closed in the mid-1920s, following a campaign against prostitution by the Roman Catholic Legion of Mary, its financial viability having already been seriously undermined by the withdrawal of soldiers from the city following the Anglo-Irish Treaty (December 1921) and the establishment of the Irish Free State (6 December 1922).

=== The Lockout ===
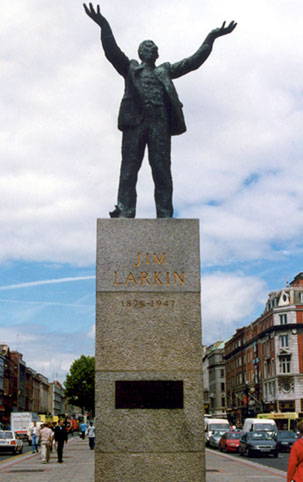
Statue of James Larkin on O'Connell Street (Oisín Kelly 1977)

In 1913, Dublin experienced one of the largest and most bitter labour disputes ever seen in Britain or Ireland – known as the Lockout. James Larkin, a militant syndicalist trade unionist, founded the Irish Transport and General Workers Union (ITGWU) and tried to win improvements in wages and conditions for unskilled and semi-skilled workers. His means were negotiation and, if necessary, sympathetic strikes. In response, William Martin Murphy, who owned the Dublin Tram Company, organised a cartel of employers who agreed to sack any ITGWU members and to make other employees agree not to join it. Larkin, in turn, called the Tram workers out on strike, which was followed by the sacking, or "lockout", of any workers in Dublin who would not resign from the union. Within a month, 25,000 workers were either on strike or locked out. Demonstrations during the dispute were marked by vicious rioting with the Dublin Metropolitan Police, which left three people dead and hundreds more injured. James Connolly in response founded the Irish Citizen Army to defend strikers from the police. The lock-out lasted for six months, after which most workers, many of whose families were starving, resigned from the union and returned to work.

== End of British Rule ==
In 1914, after nearly three decades of agitation, Ireland seemed on the brink of Home Rule (or self-government), however, instead of a peaceful handover from direct British rule to limited Irish autonomy, Ireland and Dublin saw nearly ten years of political violence and instability that eventually resulted in a much more complete break with Britain than Home Rule would have represented. By 1923, Dublin was the capital of the Irish Free State, an all but independent Irish state, governing 26 of Ireland's 32 counties.

=== Howth Gun Running 1914 ===
Unionists, predominantly concentrated in Ulster, though also with significant numbers in Dublin and throughout the country, resisted the introduction of Home Rule and founded the Ulster Volunteers (UVF) – a private army – to this end. In response, nationalists founded their own army, the Irish Volunteers, to make sure Home Rule became a reality. In April 1914, thousands of German weapons were imported by the UVF into the north (see Larne gunrunning). Some within the Irish Volunteers, and other nationalists unconnected with that organisation, attempted to do the same in July. The crew of Asgard successfully landed a consignment of surplus German rifles and ammunition at Howth, near Dublin. Shortly after the cargo was landed, British troops from the Scottish Borderers regiment tried to seize them but were unsuccessful. The soldiers were jeered by Dublin crowds when they returned to the city centre, and they retaliated by opening fire at Bachelors Walk, killing three people. Ireland appeared to be on the brink of civil war by the time the Home Rule Bill was actually passed in September 1914.

Female workers adjust the nozzles of shells in the National Shell Factory at Parkgate Street, Dublin, during the First World War

However, the outbreak of World War I led to its shelving. John Redmond, the leader of the Irish Parliamentary Party and soon to be head of the Irish National Volunteers (but not of the Irish Volunteers), called on nationalists to join the British Army. This caused a split in the Volunteers. Thousands of Irishmen did join (particularly those from working-class areas, where unemployment was high), and many died in the war. The majority, who followed Redmond's leadership, formed the National Volunteers. A militant minority kept the title of Irish Volunteers, some of whom were now prepared to fight against, rather than with, British forces for Irish independence.

=== Easter Rising 1916 ===
In April 1916, about 1,250 armed Irish republicans under Padraig Pearse staged what became known as the Easter Rising in Dublin in pursuit not of Home Rule but of an Irish Republic. One of the rebels' first acts was to declare this Republic to be in existence. The rebels were composed of Irish Volunteers and the much smaller Irish Citizen Army under James Connolly. The rising saw rebel forces take over strongpoints in the city, including the Four Courts, Stephen's Green, Boland's mill, the South Dublin Union, and Jacobs Biscuit Factory and establishing their headquarters at the General Post Office building in O'Connell Street. They held for a week until they were forced to surrender to British troops. The British deployed artillery to bombard the rebels into submission, sailing a gunboat named the Helga up the Liffey and stationing field guns at Cabra, Phibsborough, and Prussia Street. Much of the city centre was destroyed by shell fire, and around 450 people, about half of them civilians, were killed, with another 1,500 injured. Fierce combat took place along the Grand Canal at Mount Street, where British troops were repeatedly ambushed and suffered heavy casualties. In addition, the rebellion was marked by a wave of looting and lawlessness by Dublin's slum population and many of the city centre's shops were ransacked. The rebel commander, Patrick Pearse, surrendered after a week to avoid further civilian casualties. Initially, the rebellion was generally unpopular in Dublin, due to the amount of death and destruction it caused, the opinion by some that it was bad timing to irreverently hold it at Easter, and also due to the fact that many Dubliners had relatives serving in the British Army. Over 7,000 claims for compensation were submitted to the Property Losses (Ireland) Committee following the rebellion. Reconstruction work under the oversight of the Dublin city architect began following the passing of the Dublin Reconstruction (Emergency Provisions) Act 1916.

Though the rebellion was relatively easily suppressed by the British military and initially faced with the hostility of most Irish people, public opinion swung gradually but decisively behind the rebels, after 16 of their leaders were executed by the British military in the aftermath of the Rising. In December 1918, the party now taken over by the rebels, Sinn Féin, won an overwhelming majority of Irish parliamentary seats. Instead of taking their seats in the British House of Commons, they assembled in the Lord Mayor of Dublin's residence and proclaimed the Irish Republic to be in existence and themselves Dáil Éireann (the Assembly of Ireland) -its parliament.

=== War of Independence 1919–1921 ===
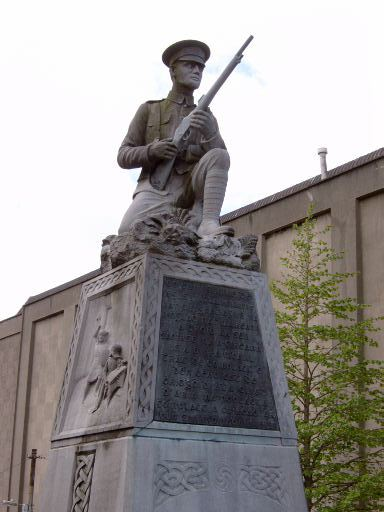
An Irish War of Independence memorial in Dublin

Between 1919 and 1921, Ireland experienced the Irish War of Independence – a guerrilla conflict between the British forces and the Irish Volunteers, now reconstituted as the Irish Republican Army. The Dublin IRA units waged an urban guerrilla campaign against police and the British army in the city. In 1919, the violence began with small numbers of IRA men (known as "the Squad") under Michael Collins, assassinating police detectives in the city. By the late 1920, this had expanded into much more intensive operations, including regular gun and grenade attacks on British troops. The IRA in Dublin tried to carry out three shooting or bombing attacks a day. Such was the regularity of attacks on British patrols that the Camden-Aungier streets area (running from the military barracks at Portobello to Dublin Castle) was nicknamed the "Dardanelles" (site of the Gallipoli campaign) by British soldiers.

The conflict produced many tragic incidents in the city, of which a number are still remembered today. In September 1920, 18-year-old IRA man Kevin Barry was captured during an ambush on Church Street in the north city in which three British soldiers were killed. Barry was hanged for murder on 1 November, despite a campaign for leniency because of his youth. Another celebrated republican martyr was IRA gunman Seán Treacy, who was killed in a shoot-out on Talbot Street in October 1920 after a prolonged manhunt for him. The British forces, in particular the Black and Tans, often retaliated to IRA actions with brutality of their own. One example of this was the Black and Tans' burning of the town of Balbriggan, just north of Dublin in September 1920 and the "Drumcondra murders" of February 1921, when Auxiliary Division troops murdered two suspected IRA men in the city's northern suburb.

The bloodiest single day of these "troubles" (as they were known at the time) in Dublin was Bloody Sunday on 21 November 1920, when the Michael Collins' "Squad" assassinated 18 British agents (see Cairo gang) around the city in the early hours of the morning. The British forces retaliated by opening fire on a Gaelic football crowd in Croke Park in the afternoon, killing 14 civilians and wounding 65. In the evening, three republican activists were arrested and killed in Dublin Castle.

In response to the escalating violence, the British troops mounted a number of major operations in Dublin to try to locate IRA members. From 15 to 17 January 1921, they cordoned off an area of the north inner city bounded by Capel Street, Church Street and North King Street, allowing no one in or out and searching house to house for weapons and suspects. In February, they repeated the process in Mountjoy Square and then the Kildare Street-Nassau Street area; however, these curfews produced few results. The largest single IRA operation in Dublin during the conflict came on 25 May 1921, when the IRA Dublin Brigade burned down the Custom House, one of Dublin's finest buildings, which housed the headquarters of local government in Ireland; however, the British were soon alerted and surrounded the building. Five IRA men were killed and over 80 captured in the operation, which was a publicity coup but a military disaster for the IRA.

=== Civil War, 1922–23 ===
Following a truce (declared on 11 July 1921), a negotiated peace known as the Anglo-Irish Treaty between Britain and Ireland was signed. It created a self-governing twenty-six-county Irish state, known as the Irish Free State. However, it also disestablished the Irish Republic, which many in the nationalist movement and the IRA, in particular, felt they were bound by oath to uphold. This triggered the outbreak of the Irish Civil War of 1922–23, when the intransigent republicans took up arms against those who had accepted a compromise with the British. The Civil War began in Dublin, where Anti-Treaty forces under Rory O'Connor took over the Four Courts and several other buildings in April 1922, hoping to provoke the British into restarting the fighting. This put the Free State, led by Michael Collins and Arthur Griffith, into the dilemma of facing British military re-occupation or fighting their own former comrades in the Four Courts.

After some prevarication and after Winston Churchill had actually ordered British troops to assault the rebels, Collins decided he had to act and borrowed British artillery to shell the republicans in the Four Courts. They surrendered after a two-day (28–30 June 1922) artillery bombardment by Free State troops, but some of their IRA comrades occupied O'Connell Street, which saw street fighting for another week before the Free State Army secured the capital (see Battle of Dublin). Over 60 combatants were killed in the fighting, including senior republican Cathal Brugha. About 250 civilians are also thought to have been killed or injured, but the total has never been accurately counted. Oscar Traynor conducted some guerrilla operations south of the city until his capture in late July 1922. Ernie O'Malley, the republican commander for the province of Leinster was captured after a shootout in the Ballsbridge area in November 1922. On 6 December 1922, the IRA assassinated Seán Hales, a member of the Dáil, as he was leaving Leinster House in Dublin city centre, in reprisal for the executions of their prisoners by the Free State. The following day, the four leaders of the republicans in the Four Courts (Rory O'Connor, Liam Mellows, Dick Barret, and Joe McKelvey) were executed in revenge. Dublin was relatively quiet thereafter, although guerrilla war raged in the provinces. The new Free State government eventually suppressed this insurrection by mid-1923. In April, Frank Aiken, IRA chief of staff, ordered the anti-treaty forces to dump their arms and go home. The civil war left a permanent strain of bitterness in Irish politics that did much to sour the achievement of national independence.

== Independence and 20th century ==
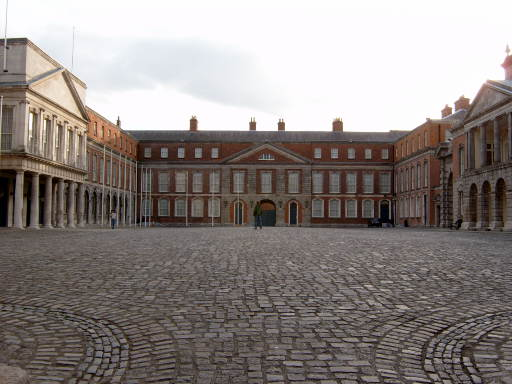
Dublin Castle, seat of British rule until 1922

Dublin had suffered severely in the period 1916–1922. It was the scene of a week's heavy street fighting in 1916 and again on the outbreak of the civil war in 1922. The casualties in Dublin of the revolutionary period from 1916 to 1923 come to about 1,000 dead – 482 killed in the 1916 Easter Rising, another 309 fatal casualties in the 1919–21 War of Independence and finally about 250 killed in the city and county in the Civil War of 1922–23.

Many of Dublin's finest buildings were destroyed at this time; the historic General Post Office (GPO) was a bombed out shell after the 1916 Rising; James Gandon's Custom House was burned by the IRA in the War of Independence, while one of Gandon's surviving masterpieces, the Four Courts had been seized by republicans and bombarded by the pro-treaty army. (Republicans in response senselessly booby-trapped the Irish Public Records Office, destroying one thousand years of archives). These buildings were later rebuilt.

The new state set itself up as best it could. Its Governor-General was installed in the former Viceregal Lodge, residence of the British Lord Lieutenant of Ireland, because it was thought to be one of the few places where he was not in danger from republican assassins. Parliament was set up temporarily in the Duke of Leinster's old palace, Leinster House, where it has remained ever since. Over time, the GPO, Custom House and Four Courts were rebuilt. While major schemes were proposed for Dublin, no major remodelling took place initially.

=== The "Emergency" ===
Ireland was officially neutral during the Second World War (see Irish neutrality during World War II). So much so that it was not even called "the war" in Irish discourse, but "The Emergency". Although Dublin escaped the mass bombing of the war due to Ireland's neutrality, the German air-force bombed Dublin on 31 May 1941, and hit the North Strand – a working-class district in the north inner city – killing 34 Irish civilians and wounding another 90. The bombing was declared accidental, although many suspected that the bombing was deliberate revenge for de Valera's decision to send fire engines to aid the people of Belfast following a major bombing in that city. One faction of the IRA hoped to take advantage of the war by getting German help and invading Northern Ireland. In December 1939, they successfully stole almost all the Irish Army's reserve ammunition in a raid on the Magazine Fort in Dublin's Phoenix Park. In retaliation, de Valera's government interned IRA members and executed several of them. The war years also saw rationing imposed on Dublin and the temporary enlargement of the small Jewish community by Jews who fled there from Nazi persecution.

=== Tackling the tenements ===
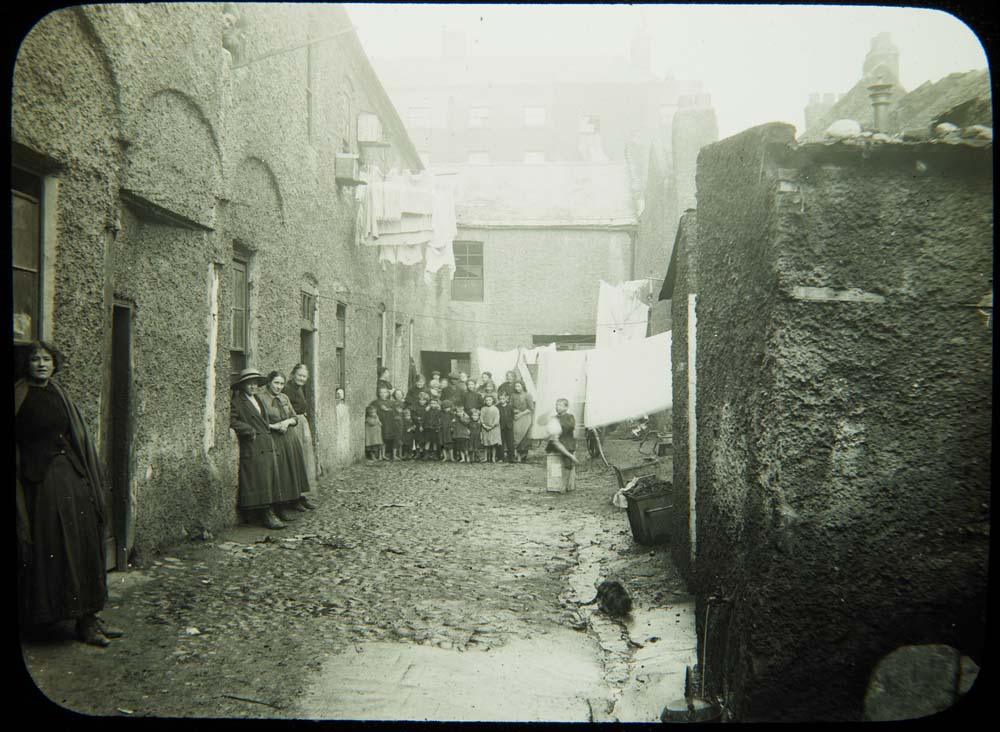
A tenement slum off Henrietta Street, c. 1913

The first efforts to tackle Dublin's extensive slum areas came on the foundation of the Iveagh Trust in 1891, and the Dublin Artisan Dwellings Company, but these could only help several thousand families. The main focus of the government in 1900–1914 was on building 40,000 cottages for rural workers. Some public planning for the city was made in the first years of the Irish Free State and then effected after 1932, when Éamon de Valera came to power. With greater finances available and lower wages due to the Great Depression, major changes began to take place. A scheme of replacing tenements with decent housing for Dublin's poor began. Some new suburbs, such as Marino and Crumlin, were built, but Dublin's inner city slums remained.

It was not until the 1960s that substantial progress was made in removing Dublin's tenements, with thousands of Dublin's working-class population being moved to suburban housing estates around the edge of the city. The success of this project was mixed. Although the tenements were largely removed, such was the urgency of providing new housing that little planning went into their construction. New and growing suburbs like Tallaght, Coolock and Ballymun instantly acquired huge populations, of up to 50,000 people in Tallaght's case, without any provision of shops, public transport or employment. As a result, for several decades, these places became bywords for crime, drug abuse and unemployment. In recent years, such problems have eased somewhat, with the advent of Ireland's so-called 'Celtic Tiger' economic boom. Tallaght in particular has become far more socially mixed and now has very extensive commercial, transport and leisure facilities. Ballymun Flats, one of the State's few high-rise housing schemes, was largely demolished and re-designed in recent years.

Ironically, however, given Ireland's newfound economic prosperity and consequent immigration, there is once again a housing shortage in the city. Increased employment has led to a rapid rise in the city's population. As a result, prices for bought and rented accommodation have risen sharply, leading to many younger Dubliners leaving the city to buy cheaper accommodation in counties Meath, Louth, Kildare and Wicklow, while still commuting daily to Dublin. This has arguably impacted negatively on the quality of life in the city – leading to severe traffic problems, long commuting times and urban sprawl.

=== Destruction of Georgian Dublin in the 1960s ===
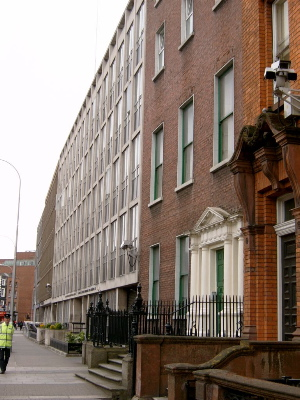
Georgian house on St Stephen's Green: a surviving Georgian house on St Stephen's Green, stuck between a Victorian building (picture right) and a 1960s office block (left). More than half of the Georgian buildings on St Stephen's Green have been lost since the Georgian era, with many demolished in the 1950s and 1960s.

As part of the building programme that also cleared the inner city slums, from the 1950s onwards, historic Georgian Dublin came under concerted attack by the Irish Government's development policies. Whole swathes of 18th-century houses were demolished, notably in Fitzwilliam Street and St Stephen's Green, to make way for utilitarian office blocks and government departments. Much of this development was fuelled by property developers and speculators keen to cash in on the buoyant property markets of the 1960s, late 1970s and 1980s. Many schemes were built by Government supporters with the intention of profitably letting to highly desirable State tenants such as government departments and State agencies. It has been proven that many buildings were approved by government ministers personally connected with the developers involved, often to the detriment of the taxpayer and the proper planning and preservation of Dublin city.

Some of this development was also encouraged by Ireland's dominant nationalist ideology of that era, which wanted to wipe away all physical reminders of Ireland's colonial past. An extreme example of this kind of thinking was the destruction of Nelson's Pillar in O'Connell Street in 1966. This statue of the famous British admiral was a Dublin landmark for a century, but was blown up by a small bomb shortly before the 50-year commemorations of the Easter Rising. In 2003, the Pillar was replaced as a landmark by the Dublin Spire which was erected on the same spot. A 120 m tall tapered metal pole, it is the tallest structure of Dublin city centre, visible for miles. It was assembled from seven pieces with the largest crane available in Ireland and is the tallest street sculpture in the world.

Far from the destructive practices of the 1960s diminishing as time went on, if anything, they got steadily worse, with the concrete office blocks of earlier times being replaced with the idea of Georgian pastiche or replica offices in place of original 18th-century stock. Whole swathes of Harcourt Street and St. Stephen's Green were demolished and rebuilt in such a fashion in the 1970s and 1980s, as were parts of Parnell Square, Kildare Street, North Great George's Street and many other areas around the city. Many saw this practice as an 'easy way out' for planners; a venerable Georgian front was maintained, whilst 'progress' was allowed to continue unhindered. This planning policy was pursued by Dublin Corporation until around 1990, when the forces of conservationism finally took hold.

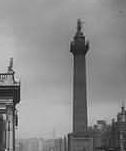
Nelson's Pillar on O'Connell Street (destroyed 1966)

However, it was not only sites associated with the British presence in Ireland that fell victim to Irish developers. Wood Quay, where the oldest remains of Viking Dublin were located, was also demolished, and replaced with the headquarters of Dublin's local government, though not without a long and acrimonious planning struggle between the government and preservationists. More recently, there has been a similar controversy over plans to build the M50 motorway through the site of Carrickmines Castle, part of the Pale's southern frontier in medieval times. It has recently been alleged that much controversial building work in Dublin-—over green spaces as well as historic buildings—-was allowed as a result of bribery and patronage of politicians by developers. Since the late 1990s, there have been a series of tribunals set up to investigate corruption in Dublin's planning process.

=== Northern Troubles ===
Dublin was affected to varying degrees by "the Troubles" a civil conflict that raged in Northern Ireland from 1969 to the late 1990s. In 1972, angry crowds in Dublin burned down the British Embassy in Merrion Square in protest at the shooting of 13 civilians in Derry on Bloody Sunday (1972) by British troops. The IRA Southern Command was headquartered in Dublin and was responsible for training camps, recruiting, financing, safe houses, and weapons procurement in the Republic or overseas to support IRA Northern Command operations in Northern Ireland (see Provisional IRA in the Republic of Ireland). This safe haven in the Republic primarily contributed to the longevity of the conflict.

However, the city did not generally experience paramilitary violence directly, with the exception of a period in the early to mid 1970s when it was the target of several loyalist bombings. The 1972 and 1973 Dublin bombings killed 3 people and injured 185. The worst bomb attacks, however, occurred on Talbot Street in 1974. The Dublin and Monaghan Bombings on 17 May 1974 were a series of terrorist attacks on Dublin and Monaghan in the Republic of Ireland which left 33 people dead (26 of them in Dublin), and almost 300 injured, the largest number of casualties in any single day in the Troubles. Although no organisation claimed responsibility for the attacks at the time, loyalist paramilitaries from Northern Ireland (in particular the Ulster Volunteer Force) were widely blamed. In 1993, the Ulster Volunteer Force admitted they carried out the attacks. It has been widely speculated that the bombers were aided by members of the British security forces.

In the early 1970s, the Irish government cancelled the hitherto annual Easter parade commemorating the Rising of 1916 and, in 1976, banned it, fearing it was serving as a recruiting tool for illegal republican paramilitaries. Nevertheless, the Provisional republican movement organised a demonstration 10,000 strong on Easter Sunday. However the risks the Provisional IRA posed to the state were highlighted several months later when the organisation assassinated the British Ambassador to Ireland Christopher Ewart-Biggs near his home at Sandyford in south Dublin.

In 1981, there was considerable solidarity in Dublin with republican paramilitaries who were on hunger strike in Northern prisons. When Anti H-Block Irish republican protesters, over 15,000 strong, tried to storm the new British Embassy (reconstructed after the events of 1972), there took place several hours of violent rioting with over 1,500 Gardaí, before the protesters were dispersed. Over 200 people were injured, and dozens were arrested.

Other, more peaceful demonstrations were held in the 1990s in Dublin, calling for the end of the Provisional IRA campaign in the North. The largest of these took place in 1993, when up to 20,000 people demonstrated in O'Connell Street after the IRA killed two children with a bomb in Warrington in northern England. Similar demonstrations occurred in 1995 and 1996 when the IRA ended its ceasefire, called in 1994, by bombing London and Manchester.

On 25 February 2006 rioting broke out between Gardaí and a group of hardline Irish Republicans protesting the march of a "Love Ulster", loyalist parade in O'Connell Street. The small group of political activists were joined by hundreds of local youths, and running battles continued on O'Connell Street for almost three hours, where three shops were looted. The marchers themselves were bused to Kildare Street for a token march past Dáil Éireann which prompted some 200 or so rioters to move from O'Connell Street to the Nassau Street area, setting cars alight, attacking property, including the headquarters of the Progressive Democrats, before dispersing.

=== Regeneration of Dublin ===
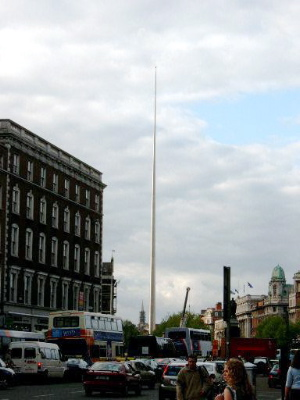
The Spire of Dublin, the world's tallest street sculpture

Since the 1980s, there has been a greater awareness among Dublin's planners of the need to preserve Dublin's architectural heritage. Preservation orders have been put on most of Dublin's Georgian neighbourhoods. The new awareness was also reflected in the development of Temple Bar, the last surviving part of Dublin that contained its original medieval street plan. In the 1970s, Córas Iompair Éireann (CIÉ), the state transport company, bought up many of the buildings in this area, with a view to building a large modern central bus station on the site with a shopping centre attached. However, most of the buildings had been rented by artists, producing a sudden and unexpected appearance of a 'cultural quarter' that earned comparisons with Paris's Left Bank. The vibrancy of the Temple Bar area led to demands for its preservation. By the late 1980s, the bus station plans were abandoned, and a master plan was put in place to maintain Temple Bar's position as Dublin's cultural heartland, with large-scale government support. That process has been a mixed success. While the medieval street plan has survived, rents have rocketed, forcing the artists elsewhere. They have been replaced by restaurants and bars, which draw thousands of tourists but which have been criticised for over-commercialisation and excessive alcohol consumption. Also, in the late 1980s, the Grafton and Henry Street areas were pedestrianised.

However, the real transformation of Dublin has occurred since the late 1990s, when the so-called 'Celtic Tiger' economic boom took effect. The city, previously full of derelict sites, has seen a building boom – especially the construction of new office blocks and apartments. The most visually spectacular of these developments is the International Financial Services Centre (IFSC)- a financial district almost a kilometre long situated along the north quays. While the former tramways had been torn up in the 1950s in favour of buses, the new Luas tram service started in 2004. Though slow to develop, Dublin Airport had become the 16th busiest international airport by 2007.

=== Heroin problem ===
In the late 1970s, 1980s and 1990s, Dublin suffered a serious wave of drug addiction and associated crime throughout its working-class areas. The introduction of the drug heroin into the inner city in the late 1970s accentuated social problems associated with unemployment, poor housing and poverty. These problems were twofold. Firstly, heroin addiction caused a wave of petty crime such as muggings, robbery and so forth as addicts tried to secure money for their next "fix". This made many of the affected areas all but uninhabitable for the rest of the population. In addition, many addicts ultimately died from diseases such as AIDS and hepatitis caused by sharing needles. Secondly, the drug trade saw the establishment of serious organised crime syndicates in the city, whose use of violence led to many murders being committed. The most notorious of these killings was that of the journalist Veronica Guerin in 1996, who was killed by criminals she was investigating for a Sunday newspaper. The drug problem led to a widespread anti-drugs movement, the most well-known group was the Concerned Parents Against Drugs, which peaked in the mid-1990s, whose members tried to force drug dealers out of their neighbourhoods. The anti-drugs campaigners were accused of being vigilantes, or a front for Sinn Féin and the Provisional IRA, although this allegation has been vigorously disputed.

== Twenty-First Century ==
=== Immigration ===
Dublin was traditionally a city of inward migration, with its population steadily growing, even as that of the rest of Ireland fell, from the mid-19th century. The population of the city doubled over the course of that century to about 400,000 people by 1900 It doubled again over the course of the twentieth century, reaching nearly one million by 1980. However, the vast bulk of people arriving in the city came from the rest of Ireland. There was also significant emigration from the city due to persistently high unemployment and a high birth rate, leading many of its inhabitants to leave, notably to Britain and the United States in search of work. However, the 21st century saw this process reversed dramatically, with the Irish economic boom attracting immigrants from all over the world. The largest single group to arrive in the city was initially returning Irish emigrants, but there was also substantial immigration from other nationalities. Dublin became home by the early 2000s to large communities of Chinese, Nigerians, Brazilians, Russians, Romanians and many others – especially from Africa and eastern Europe. After the accession of several eastern European countries into the European Union in 2004, eastern Europeans became the single largest immigrant group in Dublin. Poland was the most common single point of origin, with well over 150,000 young Poles having arrived in Ireland since late 2004; the majority being concentrated in Dublin and its environs.

The first wave of immigration into Dublin dipped during the financial crash of 2008–09, which hit Ireland and Dublin's economy hard. However, as the economy recovered, immigration began to pick up again, rising sharply in the late 2010s and 2020s. By 2022, the county of Dublin's population had risen to over 1.4 million, over 17 per cent of whom were foreign-born. In inner-city Dublin the proportion of foreign-born residents was much higher, with only 36 per cent in the north inner city area describing themselves as 'white Irish' in the 2022 census. Unlike the previous wave of migration, the majority of the late 2010s and 2020s migrants were from outside of Europe, the largest groups of foreign citizens now being Brazilians and Indians, followed by Poles and Romanians. The post-pandemic migration to Dublin, from 2022 onwards also saw a sharp rise in the arrival of those claiming asylum, with up to 600 arriving every week in 2024, many of whom ended up living in makeshift camps as no accommodation was available.

By the 2020s, some antagonism had begun to develop against immigrants, particularly asylum seekers in Dublin, with numerous protests against the placement of migrants in places such as the East Wall, Finglas, Coolock and elsewhere. Some of these included the burning of buildings, such as a disused hotel in Ringsend, that were thought to have been intended to house asylum seekers. In November 2023, a serious riot broke out on O'Connell Street, after a man of Algerian origin stabbed several schoolchildren in adjoining Parnell Square. A crowd first attempted to break into the crime scene and began attacking Gardai. A Luas tram and four Dublin Bus vehicles were set on fire and several shops were looted. Dublin City Council estimated the damage done as costing 20 million euros to repair. The Garda Commissioner Drew Harris described the rioters as "a lunatic, hooligan faction driven by far-right ideology".

== See also ==
- Dublin Historical Record
- Historical Maps of Dublin
- Timeline of Dublin

== Notes ==
- ^aDublin City Council & its Millennium
- ^b Peritia: Journal of the Mediæval Academy of Ireland Volume 5 (1986) The Slave Trade of Dublin, Ninth to Twelfth Centuries – Poul Holm
- ^c Dublin's Tram system was discontinued in the 1950s and its tracks taken up. However, in the early 2000s, a new tram system called the Luas was installed at great expense. It was opened in 2004.
