= Joan Tighe =

Irish journalist and historian (1922–2014)

- Born: 28 June 1922 Dublin, Ireland
- Died: 30 January 2014 (aged 91) Dublin, Ireland
- Occupation: Fashion journalist, editor and local historian
- Education: Abbey Theatre School

Joan Tighe (28 June 1922 – 30 January 2014) was an Irish fashion journalist, editor and local historian. She wrote for Tatler and Sketch, the Evening Herald and the Dublin Historical Record (DHR).

== Biography ==
Tighe was born on 28 June 1922 in Dublin, Ireland, to Robert Tighe and his Catherine Angela Tighe (née Moloney). She had five siblings and the family lived in Phibsborough, before moving to Glasnevin.

Tighe was educated at Holy Faith Convent School, then studied at Abbey Theatre School in the Peacock Theatre. Unable to support herself with an income from acting, Tighe took a secretarial course in shorthand and typing.

Tighe began her journalism career at advertising agency Wilson Hartnell, writing for fashion, features and social news for their women's glossy monthly magazine Tatler and Sketch (later the Irish Tatler). In 1966, Bartle Pitcher of Independent Newspapers then hired Tighe to write for the Evening Herald as the women’s page editor and fashion columnist, for his paper to be competition to rival publication the Evening Press. As a fashion journalist, Tighe was credited by designer Paul Costelloe for "giving him his first break."

Tighe was also a local historian of Dublin and served as literary editor of the Dublin Historical Record (DHR), published by the Old Dublin Society, from December 1960 to December 1971. She is credited with increasing the illustrations in the journal.

Tighe retired from full time journalism in 2002, but continued to write freelance articles.

Tighe died on 30 January 2014 in Dublin, aged 91.
