= Abbey Theatre School =

Former Irish drama school in Dublin

Coordinates: 53.3486°N 6.2572°W

The Abbey Theatre School or the Abbey School of Acting, was a drama school associated with the Abbey Theatre, Dublin, Ireland. Established in 1911 by W. B. Yeats, it was developed by Lady Gregory to continue performances in Dublin while the main cast of the theatre was overseas, usually in America.

The school's first director was the theatre director Nugent Monck, whom Yeats asked to begin the school. The first play performed by the school was The Countess Cathleen, written by Yeats.

The school was the primary place in Ireland where amateur actors could receive training for an acting career before breaking into paid work. In the beginning, the school's plays were performed in the Abbey Theatre, but in 1927 the venue for them became the newly constructed Peacock Theatre, located on the first floor of the Abbey Theatre's building.

Many well-known Irish actors and directors attended or taught at the school. Among them were Lennox Robinson, Stephen Rea, and Frank Fay.

There were gaps in the operation of the school, sometimes long ones, and according to Tomás MacAnna it was revived many times. One brief period of activity was in the years 1967–1970, when Frank Dermody attempted to revive it, but it was closed after a number of complaints.

Among the last actors to graduate from the school were Deirdre Donnelly, Maria McDermottroe, and Colm Meaney. Journalist Joan Tighe was also a student at the school.

== Early productions featuring the Abbey School of Acting ==
- The Countess Cathleen W. B. Yeats. 14, 15, 16 December 1911
- The Annunciation by Anon. 4 January 1912
- Spreading the News by Lady Gregory. 8 February 1912
- The Land of Heart's Desire by W.B. Yeats. 22, 23, 24 February 1912
- The World and the Chylde by Anon. 29 February 1912
