= Southside People =

Irish newspaper

The Southside People is a free newspaper for the southside of Dublin, part of the Dublin People group of free newspapers distributed to homes in Dublin and available in supermarkets and convenience stores throughout the city. It closed in May 2020 but reopened under new management later that year.

== History ==
During the mid-1990s the Dublin People acquired the South News title, which was converted to Southside People. Its editor was Neil Fetherstone, a former Northside People (east) journalist. Jamie Deasy was the paper's main journalist.

In May 2020, following the COVID-19 pandemic's arrival in Ireland, North Dublin Publications Ltd—partially owned by Celtic Media Group and publisher of the Dublin freesheets, the Northside People and the Southside People—told its employees it would be shutting both papers and that it wished to have a liquidator appointed.

In July 2020, Evad IT Solutions acquired the group out of liquidation.

== See also ==
- The Southside of Dublin
- Northside People
- List of newspapers in Ireland
