= Dublin Historical Record =

- Discipline: History
- Language: English

Publication details
- History: 1938-present
- Publisher: Old Dublin Society (Republic of Ireland)
- Frequency: Biannually

Standard abbreviations
- ISO 4: Dublin Hist. Rec.

Indexing
- ISSN: 0012-6861
- LCCN: 2009-235557
- JSTOR: 00126861
- OCLC no.: 400997691

Links
- Journal homepage

The Dublin Historical Record is a history journal established in 1938 and published biannually by the Old Dublin Society. Its focus is on the History of Dublin and it is considered to be a "learned journal".

Historic editors include fashion journalist and local historian Joan Tighe.
