= Northside People =

The Northside People is part of the Dublin People group of free newspapers, distributed to homes in Dublin and available at designated pick-up-points in supermarkets and convenience stores throughout the city. It closed in May 2020 but reopened, under new ownership, later that year.

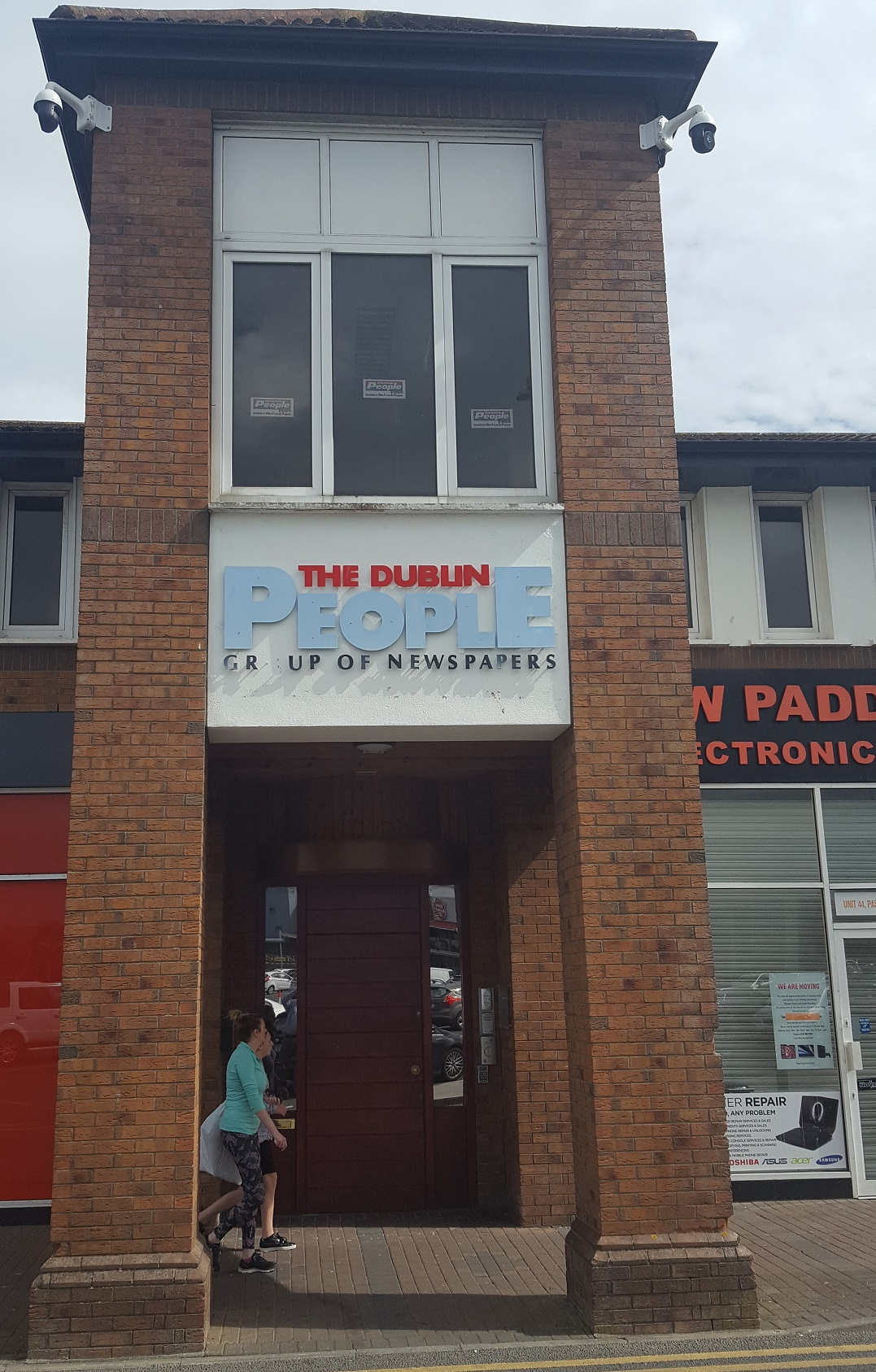
Northside People headoffice, Omni Park, Santry

== History ==
The first edition of Northside People was published in May 1987. The paper, which was founded by Robin Webb, divided in 1995 into east and west editions. Originally published on a bi-weekly basis, by the mid-1990s both editions were printed on a weekly basis. Around this time the Dublin People acquired the South News title, which was converted to Southside People.

Tim O'Brien was the first News Editor. Journalists who worked for the Dublin People group include writer and broadcaster Sean Moncrieff, playwright and novelist Lorcan Roche, Sinead Crowley, Joe Lowrey, Tom Hayes, Joe Humphries, Fiona Gartland, Nicola Tallent, Jack Gleeson, Aidan Kelly, Tony McCullagh, Ken Finlay, Pat O'Rourke, Neil Fetherston, Siobhan Maguire, Aoibhinn Twomey, Geraldine Comiskey, Sabra Aslam, Jo Anne Fox, Sean Murphy, Niall Bourke, Jamie Deasy, Warren Swords, Keith Falkiner, Michael Moloney, Melanie Finn, Brian Whelan and Kevin Jenkinson.

In 2014, Celtic Media Group (CMG) entered a management agreement to run the Dublin People Group (DPG), publisher of the Northside and Southside People titles. Frank Mulrennan, chief executive of CMG and a former business editor at the Irish Independent, became interim chief executive at DPG.

In May 2020, following the COVID-19 pandemic's arrival in Ireland, North Dublin Publications Ltd—partially owned by Celtic Media Group and publisher of the Dublin freesheets, the Northside People and the Southside People—told its employees it would be shutting both papers and that it wished to have a liquidator appointed.

In July 2020, Evad IT Solutions acquired the group out of liquidation.

=== West edition ===
The west edition was designed to target new areas in Dublin west as the city expanded into areas like Blanchardstown and beyond. It is available in areas including Ballymun, Finglas, Cabra, Phibsboro and Castleknock. The first editor of the west edition was Aidan Kelly, who held the post until he resigned in December 2005. Its last editor, Jack Gleeson, took the role in January 2006 after moving from his position as editor of sister paper, Southside People.

=== East edition ===
The original, east, edition is distributed to areas such as Coolock, Kilmore, Swords, Darndale, Priorswood, Santry, Donnycarney, Baldoyle, Sutton, Donaghmede, Artane, Whitehall, Kilbarrack, Raheny, Clontarf, Fairview, Malahide, Howth, Marino and the north-east inner city - Summerhill, Ballybough, North Strand, Sheriff Street & East Wall.

Its last editor was former chief reporter, Pat O'Rourke, who replaced Neil Fetherson after he moved into the editor's role in sister paper Southside People.

== See also ==
- Northside (Dublin)
- List of newspapers in Ireland
- The Southside People
