= Cartography of Dublin =

Historical maps of Dublin, Ireland

The Cartography of Dublin is the history of surveying and creation of maps of the city of Dublin in Ireland. The following is a list of notable historical maps of Dublin City and County Dublin.

Year	Name	Cartographer/Publisher	Notes	Image
1610	Dubline	John Speed	Size 21 cm x 18 cm. See John Speed's Map of Dublin (1610)	
1673	The city and suburbs of Dublin, from Kilmainham to Rings-End wherein the rivers, streets, lanes, alleys, churches, gates & c. are exactly described	Bernard de Gomme	Scale 1760 yards to 1 English mile.	
1685	An exact survey of the city of Dublin, and part of the harbour; anno 1685	Thomas Phillips	Scale 604 feet to an inch	Historyireland.com article
1708		Henry Pratt		
1714	Dublin	Herman Moll		Flickr image
1728	A map of the city and suburbs of Dublin	Charles Brooking	See Charles Brooking's map of Dublin (1728)	Dublin1850.com website
1756	Exact survey of the city and suburbs of Dublin	John Rocque	Produced on 4 sheets, each 705x495 mm. Scale 1:2400. Revised edition in 1773.	BNF Image
1757	A Survey of the city harbour and environs of Dublin	John Rocque	Size: 972 x 1390 W: 1008 x 1396.	Mapforum.com article
1760	An actual survey of the county of Dublin	John Rocque		
1764	Plan De La Ville De Dublin	Jacques-Nicholas Bellin	Published by Le Petit Atlas Maritime.	BnF image
1767	Exact survey of the city and suburbs of Dublin	Published by Peter Wilson	Size 34 cm x 23 cm. Scale of British feet 3 cm to 1000 feet. Published by Peter Wilson of Dame Street.	
1780	Pool and Cash's Dublin	Robert Pool and John Cash	Panorama view of Dublin.	
1782	John Robertson's plan of the city of Dublin	John Robertson	From the Universal Scots Almanack	Harvard Library detailed view
1783	Plan of Dublin from Watson's Almanack 1783		(Later known as the Treble Alamanack)	Google Map interface
1797	Plan of Greater Dublin including Circular Roads	Engraved by Samuel John Neele. Published by: William Faden.	Plan of the city of Dublin as surveyed for the use of the Divisional Justices to which have been added plans of the canal. Engraved by S. J. Neele, 52, Strand. Published by: W. Faden, Geographer to the King, Charing Cross, 2 January 1797. Sold by: W. Allen & J. Archer, Dublin.	
1798	Modern Plan of the City and Environs of Dublin	William M Wilson		Dublin1798.com website
1799	Browrigg's Map 5th Division of Dublin			
1811	Thomas Campbell's map of the City of Dublin			
1812	WDD New and Improved Plan of the Society of the Diffusion of Useful Knowledge	William Corbet of SDUK		Flickr photo
1816	Taylor's Environs of Dublin	John Taylor	Scale 2 inches to 1 mile. Kieran Swords says Taylor had a "cavalier attitude to territorial boundaries in County Dublin where he ignored civil parishes and where his barony boundaries are very sketchy".	
1818	Plan of Dublin			Google Map interface
1821	Maps of the county of Dublin	William Duncan	8 sheets. Duncan was commissioned by the Dublin Grand Jury to produce a set of maps of Dublin for administrative and planning uses.	Southern 4 sheets [layer "Duncan (1821)"]
1835	Leigh's new pocket road-book of Ireland	Published by Leigh & Son		
1836	Dublin Street Directory Map with engravings of the principal buildings in Dublin	Published by Baldwin & Cradock of SDUK	Published under the superintendence of the Society of the Diffusion of Useful Knowledge. Colour map.	Google Map interface
1837	Dublin Environs	Drawn by B. R. Davies. Published by SDUK	Published under the superintendence of the Society of the Diffusion of Useful Knowledge.	Google Map interface
1840	Pettigrew and Oulton's Dublin Directory			Google Map interface
1843	Ordnance Survey 6-inch First Edition	Ordnance Survey	Scale 6 inches to 1 mile.	OSI Mapviewer zoomable
1848	Dublin. The General Post Office Directory			Google Map interface
1848	Environs of Dublin		S. Orr and Co, Amen Corner, London	Google Map interface
1851	General Map of the Environs of Dublin and parts of Wicklow			Google Map interface
1852	Dublin Street Directory Map showing the boundaries of several wards		Size: 40.5 cm x 28 cm. Scale: 4 and one-eighth inches to one statute mile. General Post Office Directory. Colour map	Flickr photo
1863	Dublin showing the Boundaries of several Wards. Engraved for the General Post Office.		Published by Alex Thom, 87 Abbey St	Google Map interface
1865	Dublin Parish Maps			
1872	Dublin by Harper's Handbook			Google Map interface
1880	Ordnance Survey Map of the City and its Environs	Ordnance Survey	Constructed for Thom's Almanac and Official Directory. Printed and published by Alexander Thom, 87 & 88 Abbey Street, Dublin. Under direction of Lt Colonel Martin. Scale 6 inches to 1 mile.	Google Map interface – North county Dublin; Google Map interface – South county Dublin
1885	Plan of Dublin			Google Map interface
1885	Environs of Dublin		By Edward Weller F.R.G.S.	Google Map interface
1890	German map of Dublin			
1893	Insurance Plan of the City of Dublin	Charles E. Goad		
1895	Bacon's Large Scale Plan of Dublin for Cyclists and Tourists	Published by G.W. Bacon and Co., London	Size 82 cm x 70 cm. Scale 6" : 1 mile. Publish by company of George Washington Bacon (1830–1922).	Mapco.net website
1906–9	Ordnance Survey 25-inch Second Edition	Ordnance Survey	Scale 1:2500 (c.25 inches to 1 mile).	GeoHive map viewer zoomable
1912	Dublin City		Published by A&C Black, London	Google Map interface
1913	Plan of Dublin			Google Map interface
