= Old Dublin Society =

Historical organisation in Dublin, Ireland

Old Dublin Society (Cumann Seandacht Átha Cliath)
- Formation: 1934
- Legal status: Historical Society
- Purpose: To promote the study of the history of Dublin and of Dubliners
- Headquarters: Dublin, Ireland
- Location: Ireland
- Official language: English, Irish
- President: Mrs. Bernadine Ruddy
- Main organ: Council
- Website: Old Dublin Society

The Old Dublin Society (Irish: Cumann Seandacht Átha Cliath) was founded in 1934. Its mission is to promote the history of Dublin and its citizens.

== Membership ==
Membership of the society is open to everyone interested in the history of Dublin and Dubliners, most of whom are amateurs though there are some professional historians who are members.

== Publications ==
The Dublin Historical Record is the journal of the society.

== Library ==
The library of the society is located in the Royal Dublin Society premises, Ballsbridge, Dublin 4.

== See also ==
- List of historical societies in Ireland
