= Bombing of Dublin in World War II =

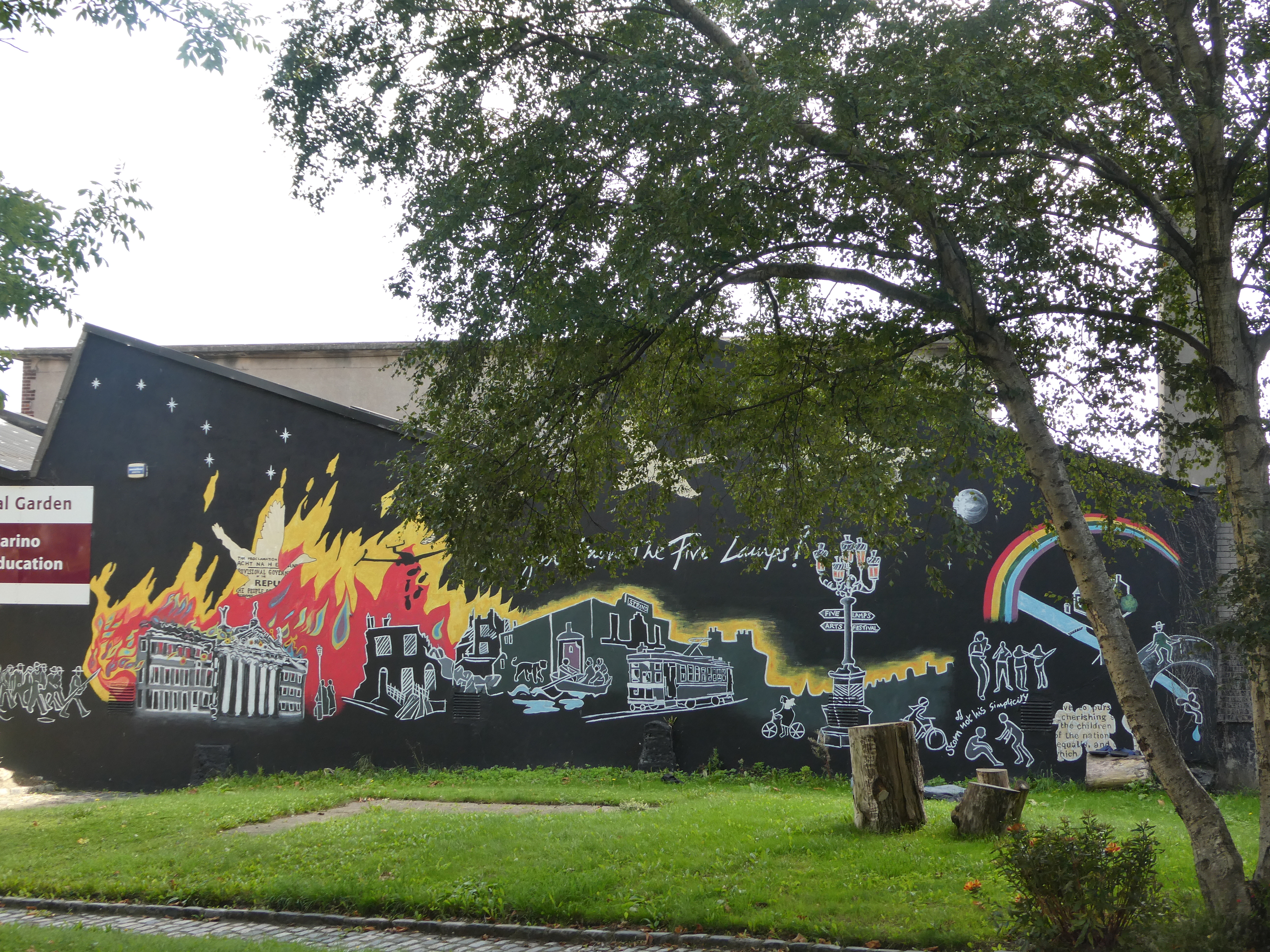
Mural commemorating the bombing

During World War II, Dublin was first bombed early on the morning of 2 January 1941, when German bombs were dropped on the Terenure area. This was followed early on the following morning of 3 January 1941, by further German bombing of houses on Donore Terrace in the South Circular Road area. A number of people were injured, but no one was killed in these bombings. Later that year, on 31 May 1941, four German bombs fell in north Dublin, one damaging Áras an Uachtaráin but with the greatest impact in the North Strand area, killing 28 people. However, the first bombing of the Republic of Ireland had taken place several months earlier, on 26 August 1940, when the Luftwaffe bombed Campile, County Wexford, killing three people.

== Background ==
At the start of the Second World War, Ireland declared its neutrality and proclaimed "The Emergency". By May 1941, the German Air Force had bombed numerous British cities, as well as Belfast in Northern Ireland, during "The Blitz". As part of the United Kingdom, Northern Ireland was at war, but the independent state of Ireland was neutral. German area bombings aimed at the United Kingdom were reduced after the launch of Operation Barbarossa in late June 1941.

== Timeline of German bombings of the Irish state ==
Despite its neutrality, Ireland experienced several bombing raids:

- 26 August 1940: Five German bombs were dropped on County Wexford in a daylight raid. One bomb hit the Shelbourne Co-operative Creamery in Campile killing three people. In 1943, the German government paid £9000 in compensation.
- 20 December 1940: At approximately 7:30 in the evening, two bombs fell on Glasthule near Dún Laoghaire (the first at the junction of Rosmeen Park and Summerhill Road and the second between Rosmeen Park and Rosmeen Gardens), injuring three people. A third bomb fell about half an hour later near Carrickmacross in County Monaghan, slightly injuring one person.
- 1–2 January 1941: bombs fell in Counties Meath, Carlow, Kildare, Wicklow, Wexford and Dublin. In Meath, five bombs fell at Duleek and three at Julianstown, without casualties; In Carlow, a house in Knockroe was destroyed, killing three people and injuring two others; In Kildare three high explosive, as well as many incendiary, bombs fell in the Curragh area; two sea mines were dropped by parachute near Enniskerry in Wicklow; Ballymurrin in Wexford saw three German bombs fall without casualties; and in Dublin, German bombs hit Terenure, two falling at Rathdown Park, with another two at Fortfield Road and Lavarna Grove, with injuries but no loss of life.
- 3 January 1941: Dublin was again hit by the German Luftwaffe, with bombs falling on Donore Terrace in the South Circular Road area with 20 people injured, but no loss of life.
- 31 May 1941: the most fatal attack occurred when four German bombs fell on North Dublin in the North Strand area, killing 28 people.
- 1 June 1941: Arklow was bombed by the Luftwaffe, with no casualties.
- 24 July 1941: Bombs fell on Dundalk, causing only minor damage and no casualties.

=== Strafing of Blackrock Island ===
On 20 August 1940, six days before the bombing of Campile, a German bomber strafed Blackrock Island off the coast of Mayo damaging several lantern panes and the roof of the Lighthouse.

== Bombings ==
=== Terenure ===
Around 10 am on 2 January 1941, two bombs were dropped in Rathdown Park, Terenure. The first bomb landed on soft ground behind the houses at the corner of Rathdown Park and Rathfarnham Road, creating a large crater but causing little other damage. The second landed behind the houses at 25 and 27 Rathdown Park, destroying both and damaging many neighbouring homes. Two other bombs were dropped on the corner of Lavarna Grove and Fortfield Road, close to the Kimmage Crossroads (KCR). Lavarna Grove was still under construction so the bomb fell on undeveloped ground, resulting in little damage, a single person injured and no loss of life.

=== Donore Terrace ===
Just before 4 am on the morning of 3 January 1941, a bomb fell at the rear of the houses located at 91 and 93 Donore Terrace in the South Circular Road area of Dublin. Three houses were destroyed and approximately fifty others damaged. Donore Presbyterian Church, the attached school and the Jewish Synagogue in Donore were also damaged. 20 people were injured, but there was no loss of life.

=== North Strand ===
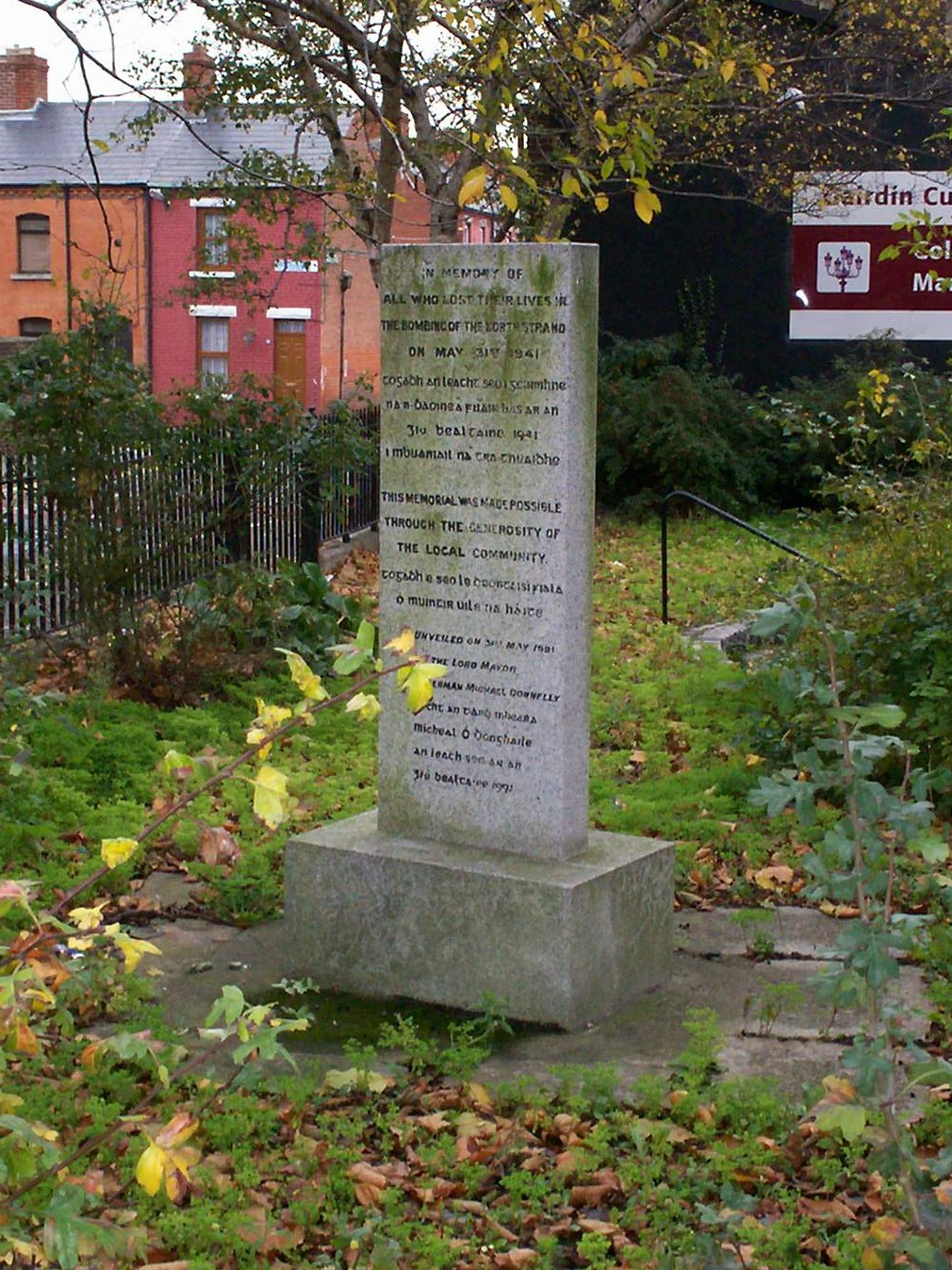
North Strand Bombing Memorial

In the early morning hours of 31 May 1941, four German bombs fell on north Dublin. That night, a large number of German aircraft were spotted by Irish military observers and searchlights were put up to track them. It was noted that the aeroplanes were not flying in formation but independently in a meandering manner and some appeared to be circling. After the German planes did not clear the airspace over Dublin and continued erratically flying over the city, the Irish Army fired warning flares, starting with three flares representing the colours of the Irish flag to inform the pilots they were over neutral territory, followed by several red flares warning them to leave or be fired on. After fifteen minutes had passed, the order was given to open fire and Irish anti-aircraft guns began firing at the bombers. Local air defences were weak and the gunners were poorly trained. Although they had shells capable of destroying bomber aircraft, they failed to hit their targets.

The bombers continued flying over the city while being fired at for almost an hour, until 1:28 AM, when a bomb fell on the city, followed immediately by another bomb one minute later and then a third bomb two minutes after that. After this, some German planes flew away while others remained. The anti-aircraft guns ceased fire. One of the German planes heading north was fired on by anti-aircraft guns over Collinstown, then turned around and soon appeared over Dublin again and began circling the city, occasionally swooping in low. Anti-aircraft guns soon engaged the aircraft and it continued making aerial manoeuvres over the city for close to half an hour, dodging anti-aircraft shells and searchlight beams. It made lower and lower swoops and was fired on with machine guns as it came in low, before dropping a bomb that landed at 2:05 AM.

Of the first three bombs dropped within minutes of each other, one fell in the Ballybough area, demolishing the two houses at 43 and 44 Summerhill Park, injuring many but with no loss of life, another fell at the Dog Pond pumping works near the Zoo in Phoenix Park, with no casualties but damaging Áras an Uachtaráin, the official residence of the Irish President (Douglas Hyde at the time) and the third made a large crater in the North Circular Road near Summerhill, again causing no injuries. The fourth and final bomb, dropped about half an hour later, fell in North Strand, killing 28 people, destroying 17 houses and severely damaging about 50 others, the worst damage occurring in the area between Seville Place and Newcomen Bridge. Ninety people were injured, approximately 300 houses were destroyed or damaged and about 400 people were left homeless.

On 5 June, a funeral was held for 12 of the victims with Éamon de Valera, the Taoiseach, and other government officials in attendance. De Valera made a speech in the Dáil Éireann (the lower house of the Irish Parliament) on the same day:

Members of the Dáil desire to be directly associated with the expression of sympathy already tendered by the Government on behalf of the nation to the great number of our citizens who have been so cruelly bereaved by the recent bombing. Although a complete survey has not yet been possible, the latest report which I have received is that 27 persons were killed outright or subsequently died; 45 were wounded or received other serious bodily injury and are still in hospital; 25 houses were completely destroyed and 300 so damaged as to be unfit for habitation, leaving many hundreds of our people homeless. It has been for all our citizens an occasion of profound sorrow in which the members of this House have fully shared. (Members rose in their places.) The Dáil will also desire to be associated with the expression of sincere thanks which has gone out from the Government and from our whole community to the several voluntary organisations the devoted exertions of whose members helped to confine the extent of the disaster and have mitigated the sufferings of those affected by it. As I have already informed the public, a protest has been made to the German Government. The Dáil will not expect me, at the moment, to say more on this head.

After the war, what became West Germany accepted responsibility for the raid and by 1958 it had paid compensation of £327,000 using Marshall Aid money. Over 2,000 claims for compensation were processed by the Irish government, eventually costing £344,000. East Germany and Austria, which were both part of Nazi Germany in 1941, made no contribution. The amounts were fixed after the 1953 Agreement on German External Debts, allowing maximum compensation.

==== Cause of the North Strand Raid ====
Several reasons for the raid have been asserted over time. German radio, operated by the Ministry of Public Enlightenment and Propaganda, broadcast that "it is impossible that the Germans bombed Dublin intentionally". Irish airspace had been violated repeatedly and Allied and German airmen were being interned at the Curragh. A possible cause was a navigational error or a mistaken target, as one of the German pathfinder pilots on the raid later recounted, claiming that Belfast had been the actual target. Numerous large cities in the United Kingdom were targeted for bombing, including Belfast, which like Dublin, is across the Irish Sea from Great Britain. War-time Germany's apology and post-war Germany's payment of compensation are cited as further indications that the cause was a navigation error on the part of the Luftwaffe pilots.

Another possible reason was that in April 1941, Germany had launched the Belfast blitz, which resulted in Belfast (part of the United Kingdom) being heavily bombed. In response, Ireland sent rescue, fire, and emergency personnel to Belfast to assist the city. De Valera formally protested against the bombing to the German government, as well as making his famous "they are our people" speech. Some have contended that the raid served as a warning to Ireland to keep out of the war. This contention was given added credibility when Colonel Edward Flynn, second cousin of Ireland's Minister for Coordination of Defensive Measures, recalled that Lord Haw Haw had warned Ireland that Dublin's Amiens Street Railway Station, where a stream of refugees from Belfast was arriving, would be bombed. The station, now called Connolly Station, stands a few hundred metres from North Strand Road, where the bombing damage was heaviest. Flynn similarly contended that the German bombing of Dundalk on 4 July was also a warning by Lord Haw Haw as a punishment for Dundalk being the point of shipment of Irish cattle sold to the United Kingdom.

After the war Winston Churchill said that "the bombing of Dublin on the night of 30 May 1941, may well have been an unforeseen and unintended result of our interference with 'Y'". He was speaking of the Battle of the Beams, wherein "Y" referred to the direction finding radio signals that the Luftwaffe used to guide their bombers to their targets. The technology was not sufficiently developed by mid-1941 to have deflected planes from one target to another and could only limit the ability of bombers to receive the signals.

== See also ==
- Battle of the Beams
- Bombings of Switzerland in World War II – bombings of another neutral area (by the Allies)
