= Amory Grant =

Grant of land to Jonathon Amory in 1675 in Dublin, Ireland

The Amory Grant is the name given to a stretch of land on the north side of the River Liffey in Dublin that was leased to Jonathon Amory in 1675 on a 299-year lease. The annual rent was set at 50 shillings and two fat capons each Christmas to the Lord Mayor of Dublin. When the lease ran out in 1974 the value of the land had increased to millions of pounds.

== Jonathon Amory ==
Jonathon Amory was born in Bristol on 14 March 1654. His father was a merchant and the family had land holdings in County Kerry. Amory is recorded as the purchaser from the city of part of the north strand of the river Liffey. This land was tidal and a mud flat.

“It is also ordered and agreed upon, by the authoritie aforesaid, that Jonathan Amory, merchant, shall have a lease of that part of the Strand on the north side of the river Liffey, situate, betwixte the wall of the Pill, in the possession of the lord Sangtry and the water mill lately built by Mr. Gilbert Mabbot, containing in breadth at the west end, along the lord Santrys wall, and from the wall there lately built by the lord Power, earle of Tyrone, in the north, to the low water marke in the south, the number of eight perches or thereabouts, and in length eastward to the cross wall over against Dirty lane, alias Hog Lane, fiftie four perches or thereabouts; at which place it contains in breadth, from the earle of Tyrone his wall in the north, to the low water marke in the south, eleven perches or thereabouts, then leaving two perches for a passage or way to the ford and Dirty lane, and also leaving sixtie foot for a highway thence all along to the corner of the wall beyond the said mill, built by the said Mr Mabbott, it conteines in breadth at the west end the number of sixteen perches or thereabouts, to the low water mark in length eastward to the ferry, over against Mr Hawkshaw his buildings, seventie two perches or thereabouts leaving sixtie foot for highway as aforesaid, from which place it is further in length eastward, a little beyond the said mill, sixtie perches or thereabouts, Which is the furthest extent eastward, and at this end it is in breadth, from the sixtie foot left for a highway to the low water marke, fourteen perches and a half, or thereabouts, for the tearme of two hundred ninetie nine yeares, at the yearly rent of fiftie shillings, sterling, to be paid to the treasurer of the cittie for the use of the cittie, and a couple of fatt capons, or five shillings, sterling, in liew thereof, every Christmas to the Lord Mayor of the cittie for the time being”.

The grant extended almost 1,200 metres (3,900 ft) in length and amounted to about 100 acres (40 ha). The land is described in terms of local landmarks, none of which are visible in the maps of Dublin drawn by John Rocque starting in 1756. Mabbot Street and lane were later named for George Mabbot.

The width of the stretch of land, described in perchs, was based on the high and low watermarks of the Liffey. The length of a perch was 7 yards (6.4 m), today it is 5.5 yards (5.0 m).

== Humphrey Jervis ==
In 1676 the beneficial ownership in the lease passed to Humphrey Jervis. Although Amory's name remained attached to the lease he faded out of the story and Jervis went on to build two bridges over the Liffey and became a very successful developer. Jervis was one of the sheriffs of Dublin at the time the lease was granted. He was later elected Lord Mayor and received a knighthood. Jervis Street in Dublin runs north from the Liffey through part of the land described in the grant. The building of quay walls turned the tidal mud flats into valuable development land.

The exact relationship between Jervis and Amory is difficult to establish. However, a connection may be established from the will of a David Houston. In this will Jervis and a Mr. Glandys were appointed to assist Houston's widow, Rebecca, in managing his affairs. A marriage licence application exists between Jonathon Amory and Rebecca Houston on 31 May 1677. The licence mentions John Glandys.

== Amory after the grant ==
The marriage of Jonathon Amory and Rebecca Houston produced at least two children. Judith Amory was baptised on 1 April 1680. Thomas Amory was baptised on 12 May 1682.

Sometime after the birth of Thomas the family, Jonathon, Rebecca, Judith, Thomas and Ann Houston, Rebecca's daughter, departed Ireland for the West Indies. It is believed that Rebecca died in Barbados sometime around 1685. Jonathon then married Martha. Most sources do not give a surname for Martha but one suggests Schenking. Sometime before 1691 Jonathon arrived in the Province of Carolina. By November 1691 he was a known inhabitant of Charleston, South Carolina or Charles Town. In 1692 Jonathon Amory was returned as a member for Berkley County to the assembly of Carolina. He was elected speaker and is noted for presiding over them as they prepared a statement of grievances and of their claims under the Provincial Constitution. Jonathan Amory, Speaker, signs this first American Bill of Rights. In 1696 as Speaker he signed the address to Governor Archdale on the occasion of the governor's return to England. In 1697 Jonathon was appointed Advocate General in South Carolina under commission from the King. He was also Public Treasurer.

Amory died in Charles Town, Carolina in 1699 from “a most infectious and detrimental distemper”. Soon afterwards his wife Martha died having settled the distribution of Jonathon's will in favour of his three children still living: Thomas (grandfather of Thomas Coffin Amory), Robert and Sarah. There is no mention in the will of any land in Dublin. His name does, however, appear on some maps of Dublin, even as late as 1756. “Amory’s Ground” is found on a plot of land now occupied by Gandon's Custom House.

== 20th Century ==
In 1988 the Amory Grant was a prize winning project in a nationwide history competition organised by the Irish Times. The project won the Lord Mayor's Millennium Award for a project on Dublin and also the Dublin City Libraries’ Award for Best Project on Dublin. The project was submitted by Linda Dolan, Linda Doyle, Denise Memery and Bernadette Roe from Rosary College, Edenmore, Dublin.

== See also ==
- John Speed's Map of Dublin (1610)
