= Ormond Square, Dublin =

Square in Dublin, Ireland

Ormond Square
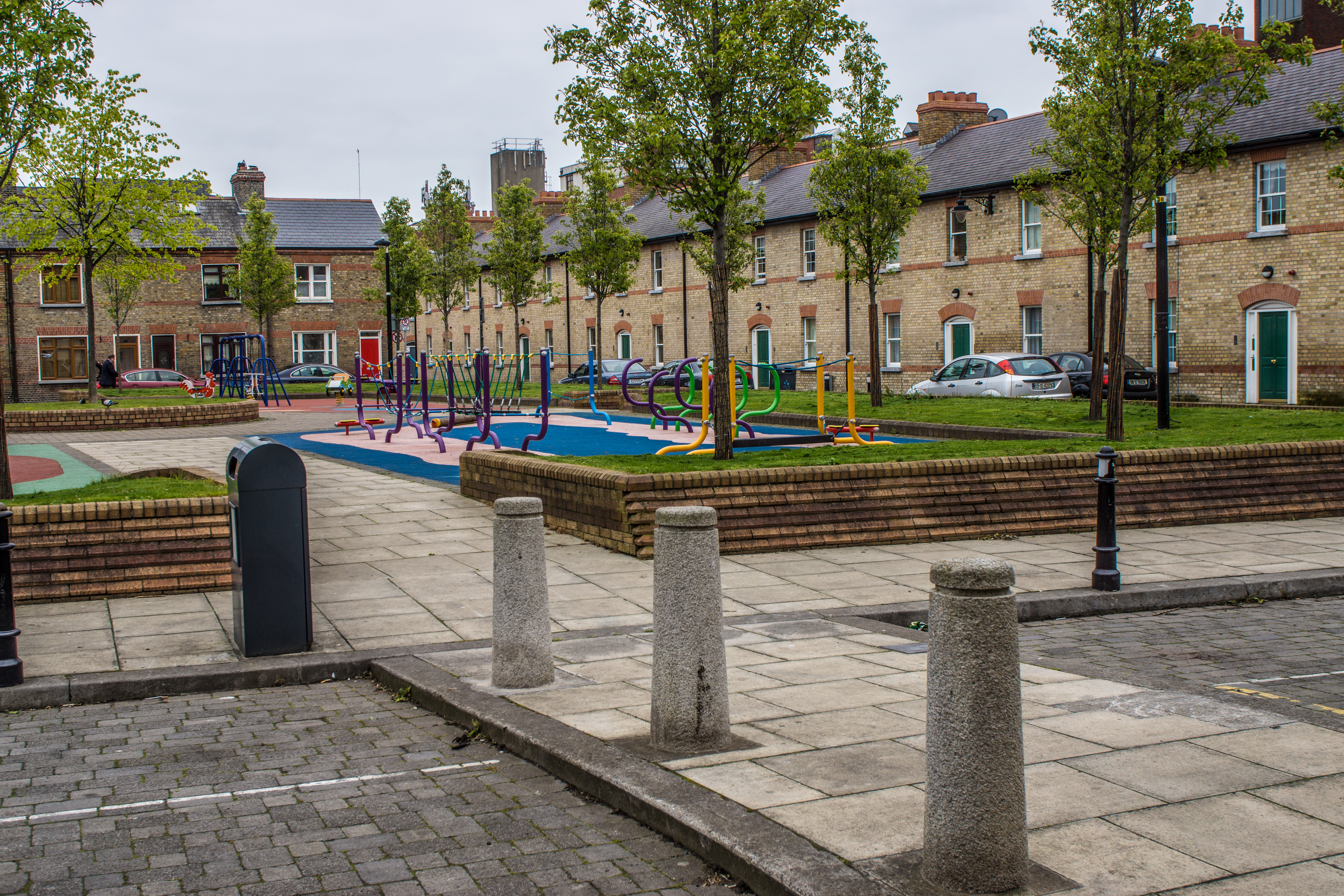
- Ormond Square in 2012

- Location within Central Dublin
- Native name: Cearnóg Urumhan (Irish)
- Namesake: James Butler, first Duke of Ormonde
- Location: Dublin, Ireland
- Postal code: D07
- Coordinates: 53.3463°N 6.2705°W

Construction
- Construction start: 1912
- Completion: 1915

Ormond Square (Irish: Cearnóg Urumhan) is a square on the northside of Dublin city.

It was originally constructed by Dublin Corporation as a square of 128 3-roomed houses at £165 each on the site of Ormond Market.

== History ==
Ormond Square sits on the site of the former Ormond Market. Along with Ormond Quay, the square is named after James Butler, 1st Duke of Ormond. Ormond Market appears on maps of Dublin in 1684, and was built on an area formerly known as The Pill. The Pill was a small river inlet which branched off the River Liffey at the estuary of the River Bradogue and the area around it, and formed part of the land granted to St Mary's Abbey. The inlet was later removed when the River Liffey was confined by the Quay walls and the land was reclaimed.

=== Ormond market ===
The circular public market building was built by Sir Humphrey Jervis in the 1690s who managed to have the markets moved from the South side of the city to nearer his estate.

It was later rebuilt in the early 1800s and consisted of an open central rotunda with 70 stalls. When the new city markets were built on Mary's Lane, the Ormond Market was demolished in 1890 and public housing was later built on the site. It was then renamed Ormond Square with the markets stalls moving to dedicated premises or to the nearby Dublin Corporation Wholesale Markets and the nearby dedicated Dublin Fish Market.

== Notable residents ==
- Johnny Giles former association football player and manager lived in 7A Ormond Square
