= Jervis Street Hospital =

Former hospital in Dublin, Ireland

- Health Service Executive
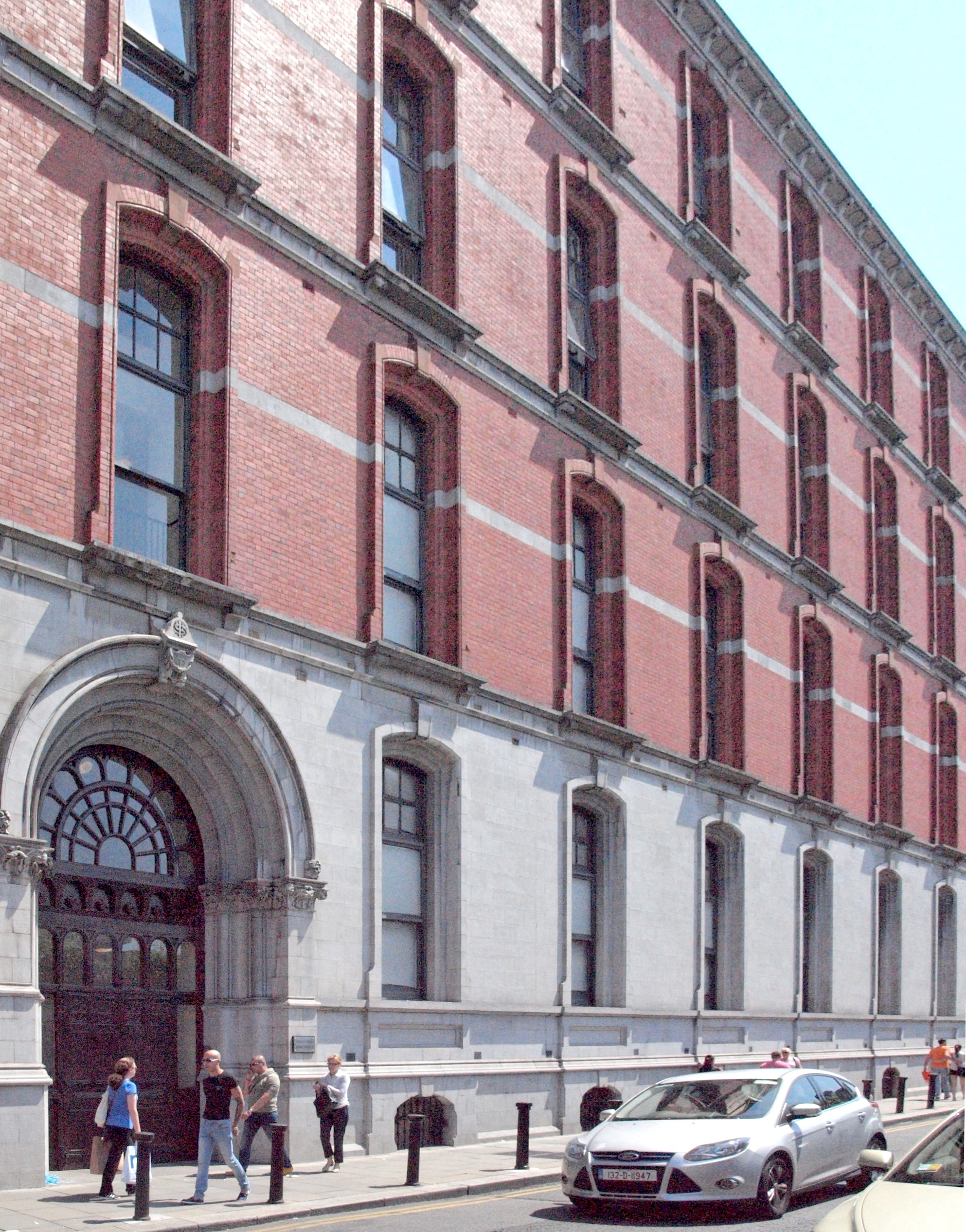
- The old Jervis Street Hospital, now a shopping centre

- Shown in Dublin

Geography
- Location: Jervis Street, Dublin, Ireland
- Coordinates: 53.348936°N 6.266276°W

Organisation
- Care system: Eastern Health Board
- Type: General Hospital

History
- Founded: 1718
- Closed: 1987

Jervis Street Hospital (Irish: Ospidéal Shráid Jervis) was a hospital in Jervis Street in Dublin, Ireland. The site of the hospital became the Jervis Shopping Centre.

== History ==
=== Charitable infirmary, Cook Street ===
The hospital was founded by six Dublin surgeons, George Duany, Patrick Kelly, Nathaniel Handson, John Dowdall, Francis Donany and Peter Brenan, at their own expense, as the Charitable Infirmary in Cook Street, Dublin, in 1718.

=== Charitable infirmary, Inns Quay ===
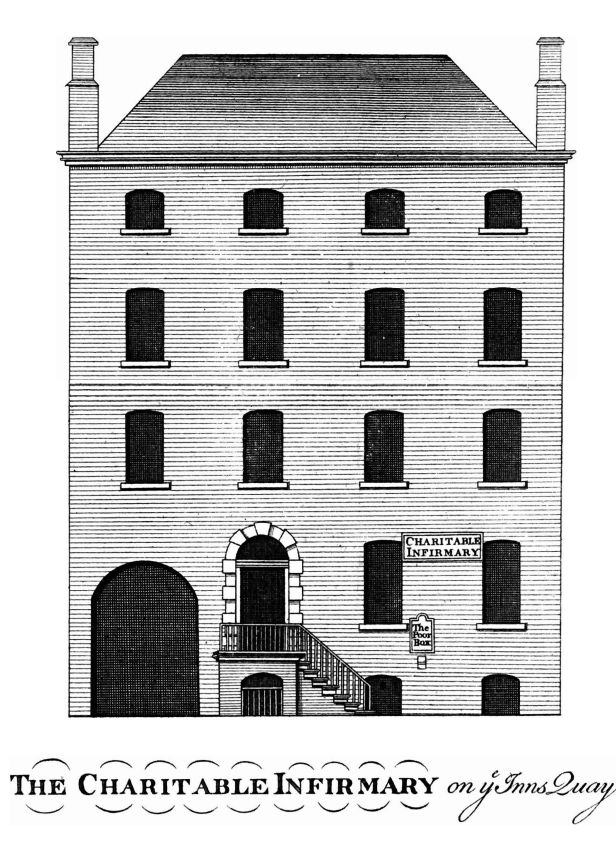
The Charitable Infirmary on ye Inns Quay

The hospital moved to larger premises on King's Inn's Quay in 1728.

=== Jervis Street ===
In 1786, when the new Four Courts were about to be erected on the quays, an agreement was reached with the Earl of Charlemont to allow the hospital to move into his former mansion at 14 Jervis Street, which happened in October 1796. Some time afterwards alterations were made in the house to convert it for hospital purposes. The hospital occupied a central place in the most populous part of the city, being close to the markets, railway termini, goods stores and shipping.

In 1854 the nursing and internal management were placed under the control of the Sisters of Mercy. The hospital was rebuilt and enlarged to a design by Charles Geoghegan in the 1880s.

The hospital staged Araby, an oriental fête, in 1894, to raise much-needed funds. The name, Araby, would live as the title of one of the short stories in Dubliners by James Joyce.

In 1931, Langford House on nearby Mary Street was demolished and replaced with a nurses school associated with the hospital.

After services were transferred to the Beaumont Hospital, the Jervis Street Hospital closed in November 1987.

The site of the hospital was redeveloped in the early 1990s to create the Jervis Shopping Centre with only the facade of the original hospital remaining.

== Notable people ==
- Robert Adams (1791–1875), elected surgeon in the 1820s.
- Dominic Corrigan (1802–1880), qualified as an MD in Edinburgh, and then appointed physician to the hospital, which had only six medical beds at the time. He was later elected Liberal MP for Dublin and was five times president of the Royal College of Physicians in Ireland.
- John King Forest (1804–1882), appointed surgeon to the hospital and also to the Theatre Royal, Dublin.
- Stephen Myles MacSwiney, M.D. (died 1890), elected Fellow of the College of Physicians and member of the Royal Irish Academy. His first professional appointment was Resident Medical Officer at St. Vincent's Hospital, Dublin. He was afterwards a physician to Jervis Street Hospital. He filled with marked ability a chair of Medical jurisprudence and contributed papers to the Dublin Journal of Medical Science, the Irish Hospital Gazette, and the Medical Press and Circular.
- Austin Meldon (1844–1904), senior surgeon at the hospital for many years.
- Sir William Thompson (1861–1926), a physician in the hospital in the early part of the 20th century. He served as Registrar General for Ireland from 1909 to 1926.
- Anne Young (1907–1976), founder of the first Irish school of general nursing.

== Sources ==
- Collin, James (1913). Life in Old Dublin. Dublin: James Duffy & Co. Archived from the original on 9 November 2007.
- Fitzpatrick, William J (1900). The History of the Dublin Catholic Cemeteries. Dublin: Cemetery Board. Archived from the original on 21 October 2007.
- O'Brien, E (1984). "Sir Dominic Corrigan (1802-1880): doctor and parliamentarian". Studies. 73 (290). Studies: 146–58. ISSN 0039-3495. PMID 11636081.
- Somerville-Large, Peter (1988). Dublin: The First Thousand Years. Belfast: Appletree Press. ISBN 978-0862812065.
