= Liffey Street =

Street in Dublin, Ireland

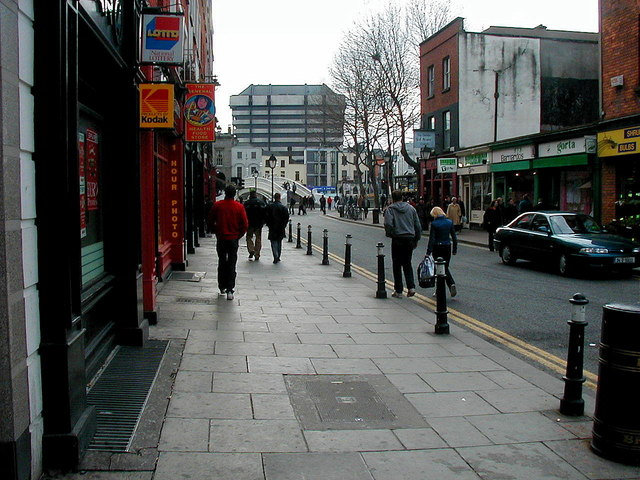
- A view of Liffey Street Lower facing towards the Liffey and the Ha'penny Bridge
- Interactive map of Liffey Street
- Native name: Sráid na Life (Irish)
- Former name: Little Denmark Street (formerly Liffey Street Upper)
- Namesake: River Liffey
- Postal code: D01
- Coordinates: 53.347442°N 6.2634633°W
- south end: River Liffey, Bachelors Walk
- Major junctions: Abbey Street, North Lotts, Strand Street
- north end: Henry Street

Construction
- Construction start: circa 1675

Other
- Designer: Humphrey Jervis
- Known for: Retail

Liffey Street (Irish: Sráid na Life) is a street on the northside of Dublin, Ireland named for its location leading towards the River Liffey. The street is split into the northernmost Liffey Street Upper and Liffey Street Lower to its south, which are separated by a dogleg corner at Abbey Street.

Originally, there was also a further northern extension of the street, which was named Liffey Street Upper; however, this was renamed Denmark Street in 1773 and referred to as Little Denmark Street to differentiate it from nearby Great Denmark Street. It was possibly named for the sister of George III; Caroline Matilda, who had married the Danish king Christian VII in 1766, becoming Queen of Denmark, was divorced in 1772 and died in 1775. Following this renaming, the original Liffey Street Middle began to be called Liffey Street Upper.

Little Denmark Street was later entirely erased in the 1970s for the construction of the Ilac Centre.

As of 2025, the street is mainly a retail street with a variety of shops, pubs, hotels, restaurants and eateries.

== History ==
=== 17th century ===
The street was laid out formally in the 17th century following the construction of Essex Bridge and was part of a grid of streets developed on 20 acres of waste land by Humphrey Jervis from 1674 onwards which included the eponymous Jervis Street. Originally, the area would have formed part of the estate of St. Mary's Abbey and a long lease was purchased by Jervis from Dublin Corporation for £3,000. He later also purchased the area of land adjacent which was originally granted to Jonathan Amory and referred to as the Amory Grant and stretched down as far as the lands of Gilbert Mabbot at Mabbot Street.

Part of the area would have been in fields as agricultural land, while much of the area of Lower Liffey Street would have been tidal mud flats, which may have flooded before it was protected by a quay wall.

=== 18th century ===
All three elements of the original street appear on John Rocque's maps of Dublin from 1756 and an outline of the street appears on the earlier 1714 map by Herman Moll but were not extant as streets at the time of the execution of John Speed's Map of Dublin (1610).

Around 1770, a church was built on Little Denmark Street that was to become St Saviour's Priory.

=== 19th century ===
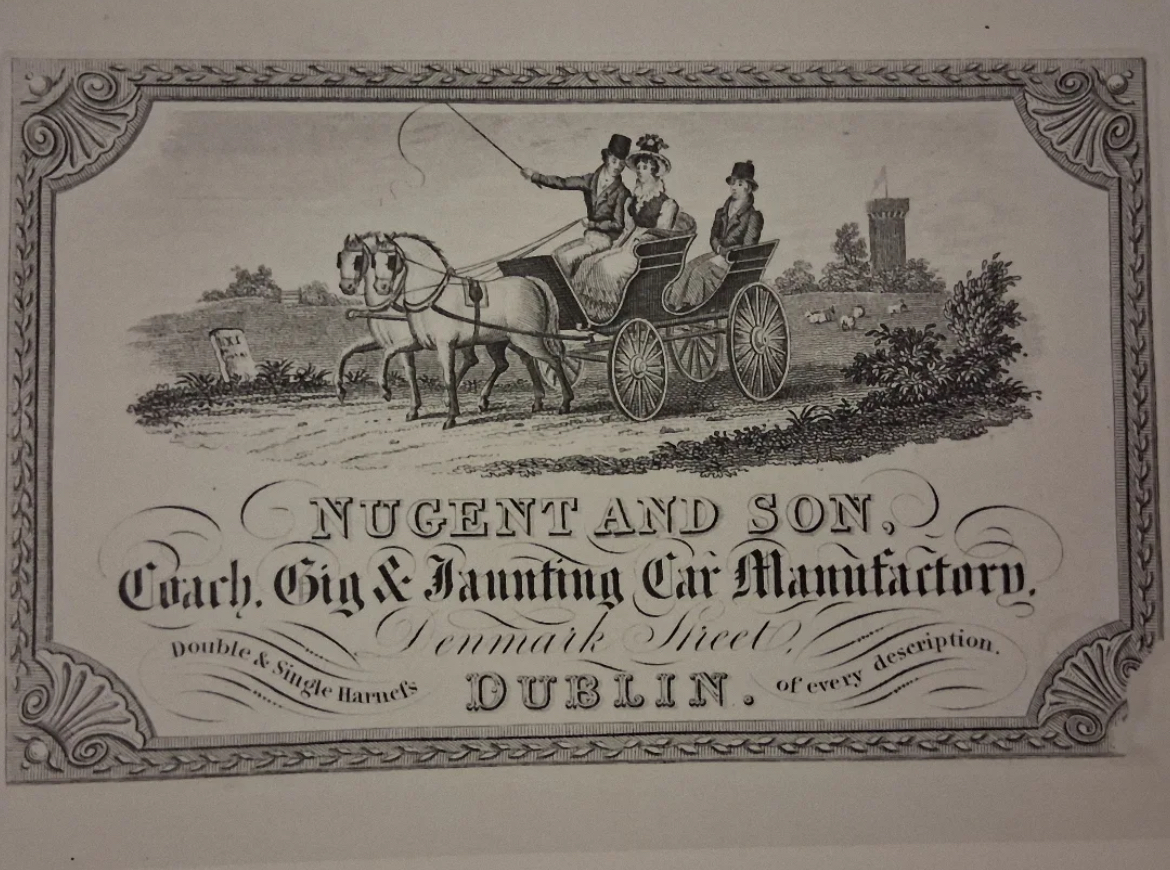
A 19th century advertisement for Nugent and Son coachmakers which were located at between 6-9 Little Denmark Street for much of the century

By the 19th century, parts of the street nearest the quay had become home to numerous furniture brokers. Nugent and Son coach manufacturers was also located on Little Denmark Street in the 19th century.

Saint Mary's Catholic Chapel was located on Liffey Street Upper from the time of its construction in 1729 until the construction of the far larger St Mary's Cathedral in 1825 saw the parish church move to a new location.

One of the earliest steel-framed commercial buildings in Dublin, Denmark House was constructed on Little Denmark Street in the 1890s.

=== 20th century ===
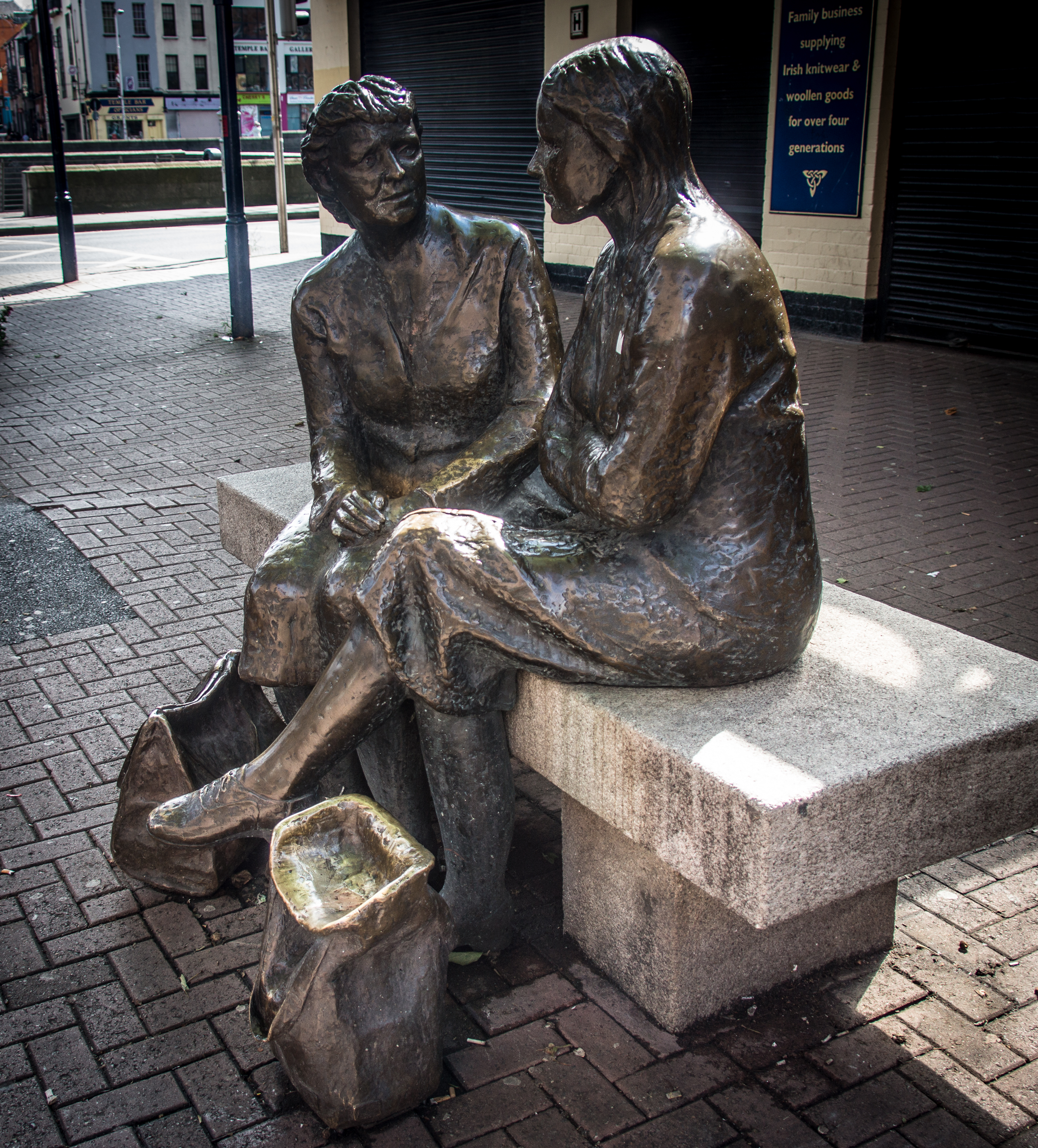
"Meeting Place" (1988) by Jackie McKenna

For a period in the 20th century the Dublin Typographical Provident Society was located at number 33 Little Denmark Street. Little Denmark Street was later to become the location of the first headquarters of 2RN in the 20th century.

Hector Grey had premises at 1-2 Liffey Street for a period in the 20th century. A plaque now marks the location of one of his shops on the street.

In 1988, a bronze sculpture of two women on a bench was added to Lower Liffey Street, near the Ha'penny Bridge. The women, depicted by the artist Jackie McKenna, are seated on a granite bench with bags of shopping at their feet and are engaged in a conversation. The sculpture is officially called "Meeting Place", but has been nicknamed "the hags with the bags".

A side entrance to the Jervis Shopping Centre was opened on the street in 1996 via a side entrance through Marks & Spencer, which had earlier been constructed on the street in 1979, while a side entrance to Arnotts department store is also located on the street.
