= Mary Street =

Mary Street may refer to:

- Mary Street, Dublin
- Mary Street, Brisbane
