= Belcamp Park =

Public park in the Clonshaugh area of Coolock in Dublin, near Darndale and Priorswood

- Páirc Belcamp
- Location within Dublin Location within Ireland
- Type: Public park
- Location: Coolock, Dublin, Ireland
- Coordinates: 53°24′25.46″N 6°12′36.13″W
- Area: 25 hectares (62 acres)
- Created: late 20th century (from an estate of the 17th century)
- Operator: Dublin City Council
- Open: Yes
- Website: www.dublincity.ie/main-menu-services-recreation-culture-dublin-city-parks-visit-park/belcamp-park

Belcamp Park (Irish: Páirc Belcamp) is a public park in the Clonshaugh area of Coolock in Dublin, near Darndale and Priorswood. The park runs south of the N32, along the northern boundary of the city. It is owned by Dublin City Council and operated by the Council's Parks and Landscape Division.

== History ==
The origins of the park lie in the lands surrounding a house named Belcamp Park in the 17th century. The then Lord Mayor of Dublin, Sir Humphrey Jervis, built a house on a property in what was then a rural area, probably in the 1680s, though he never lived there, dying in debtors prison in 1707. The estate was then sold to the Grattan family, and local tradition holds that Henry Grattan was born there in 1746. Jonathan Swift was acquainted with the Grattans, and their cousins the Jacksons at the nearby Woodlands estate in Clonshaugh, and is known to have visited at least a dozen times between 1714 and 1734. Laetitia Pilkington also stayed at the house in 1730 and later documented anecdotes of this visit concerning Swift in her Memoirs. The Grattan ownership of the estate ended in 1770 and it passed through many hands over the following centuries.

Countess Markievicz rented the property in 1909, to utilise it as a centre for the Fianna Eireann. The centre was known as the 'Belcamp Commune' when an agricultural cooperative was built and operated for a year. The cooperative was not a success, due to problems such as lack of electricity, poor water supply, damp conditions, and overgrown fields and gardens.

The estate was bought in 1969 by Dublin Corporation. Belcamp Park house was damaged by fire in 1977 and subsequently demolished, leaving behind some outbuildings and an ice house.

== Belcamp Hall and Belcamp ==
Belcamp Park should not be confused with the nearby Belcamp Hall, which is also sometimes referred to as Belcamp House. A later nearby house, also confusingly named Belcamp, survived until the 2000s but was demolished to make way for industrial buildings.

== Facilities ==
The park accommodates pitch and putt, tennis, and basketball facilities, as well as playing fields, children's play facilities, and it has an extensive network of pathways for walkers.

Belcamp Park adjoins Darndale Park, another Dublin City Council facility, which also contains an angling pond.
