= Iveagh Markets =

Former indoor market in Dublin, Ireland

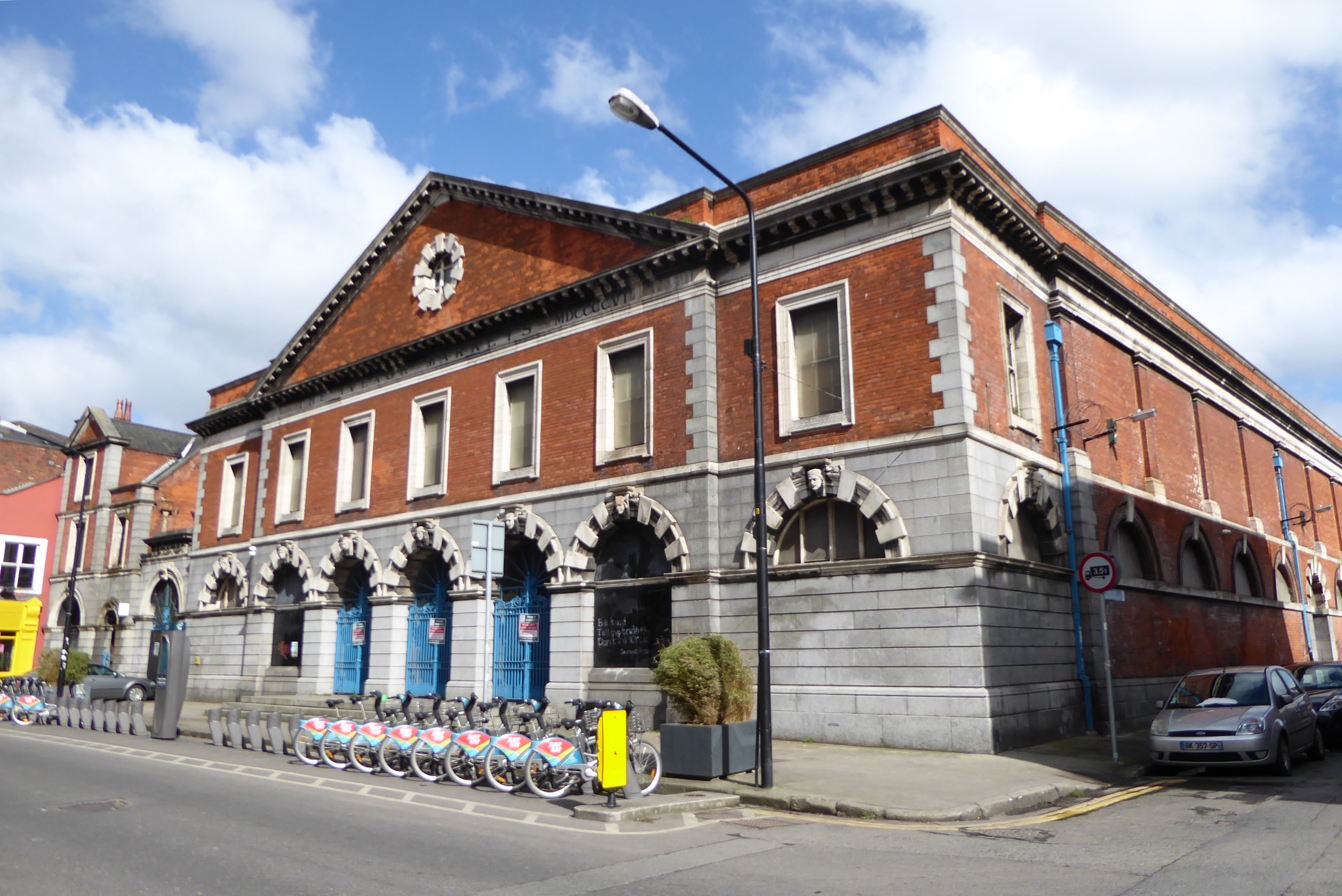
- The Francis Street entrance to the Iveagh Markets building

General information
- Status: Protected structure
- Type: Market
- Architectural style: Victorian
- Location: The Liberties, Dublin, Ireland
- Coordinates: 53°20′32.2″N 6°16′27.9″W
- Current tenants: Keane group of companies (disputed since 2020)
- Construction started: 1902
- Opened: June 1906
- Cost: £60,000
- Owner: As of 2020, control is disputed between Dublin City Council, Lord Iveagh and Martin Keane
- Landlord: Dublin City Council or Lord Iveagh (claiming reversion)

Technical details
- Material: Limestone, granite, red brick, cast iron, terracotta, portland stone

Design and construction
- Architect: Carroll & Batchelor (Frederick Hicks)
- Developer: Iveagh Trust
- Main contractor: McLaughlin & Harvey

The Iveagh Markets /ˈaɪviː/ is a former indoor market built in the Victorian style on Francis Street and John Dillon Street in The Liberties neighbourhood of Dublin, Ireland, that was open from 1906 until the 1990s.

As of 2024, the site remains derelict despite attempts to restore the site to market use.

== History ==
Until the creation by Edward Guinness, 1st Baron of Iveagh, as he then was, of the park north of St. Patrick's Cathedral in 1901, hundreds of street traders had stalls in the neighbourhood. Lord Iveagh (who was later advanced in the peerage as The 1st Viscount Iveagh, in 1905, and as The 1st Earl of Iveagh, in 1919) obtained an Act of Parliament to build and gift the markets, subject to the condition that they be run by Dublin Corporation as public markets or the title would revert to his heirs. A site was chosen on the old Sweetman's brewery which had earlier been acquired by Lord Iveagh. The site was cleared by 1900, with the objective of the new indoor market offering local traders a dry place to sell vegetables, fish, and clothes. It was built by the Iveagh Trust, which was initially a component of the Guinness Trust, founded in 1890 by Lord Iveagh.

The building was designed and built by Frederick G. Hicks. Construction started in 1902 and the market was opened in June 1906 by George William Addison as a representative of the then Viscount Iveagh. Maintenance of the market was entrusted to Dublin Corporation (now Dublin City Council). The market building was built in the Edwardian style.

The market was split into a dry market facing Francis Street and a wet market in the rear facing John Dillon Street. The dry market sold clothes while the wet market sold fish, fruit and vegetables.

An adjoining building housed laundry, disinfecting and delousing facilities. This was an innovation in the Dublin market world, and was influenced by Iveagh's sponsorship of the Lister Institute of Preventive Medicine in London a decade earlier.

The building was constructed in red brick mainly from the Portmarnock brickworks and granite from Newry. Many of the door and window frames and architraves are of imported Portland stone.

=== Closure and restoration attempts ===
By the 1980s, the market had become rundown. In 1993, the council announced plans for a IR£1.25 million refurbishment. Over the following years, the sum was determined to be inadequate and the council announced in 1996 that it was seeking a private developer to redevelop the market. In 1997, hotelier Martin Keane secured a 500-year lease with a €2 million tender. In 2007, Keane was granted planning permission to develop the market and an adjacent site into a food market complex with restaurants, a 97-bed hotel, music venue and apartment hotel. The planning permission was renewed in 2012, and a €90 million redevelopment was expected to begin in spring 2015 and finish in 2017.

In January 2018, the city council announced that it would repossess the market site and refund Keane's €2 million tender due to his failure to redevelop the site. In September 2019, an architectural condition report commissioned by the city council found that the market was "unsafe" and in an "advanced state of dereliction". The report estimated that essential repairs would cost approximately €13 million, which the city council's head of planning said cannot be covered by the city council's budget.

On 8 December 2020, it was revealed that Edward Guinness had commissioned a security team to gain occupancy and forcibly repossess the site in the early hours of that morning, citing the provisions in the 1901 Act that ownership would revert to the Guinness family if the site was not actively developed as a market. Lord Iveagh and the Iveagh Trustees Ltd. reported through a spokesman that they intended that the site would be developed "in a manner conforming with the wishes of the 1st Earl".

In September 2023, it was announced that the government would provide €9 million in funding for conservation works to the market.

In October 2023, Dublin City Council, Keane and Lord Iveagh all appeared before the High Court claiming ownership of the property.

In December 2024, it was reported that the directors of the company that controlled the site expressed confidence in retaining control of the site for the Keane-controlled company, with redevelopment to proceed once title questions have been resolved.

== Gallery ==
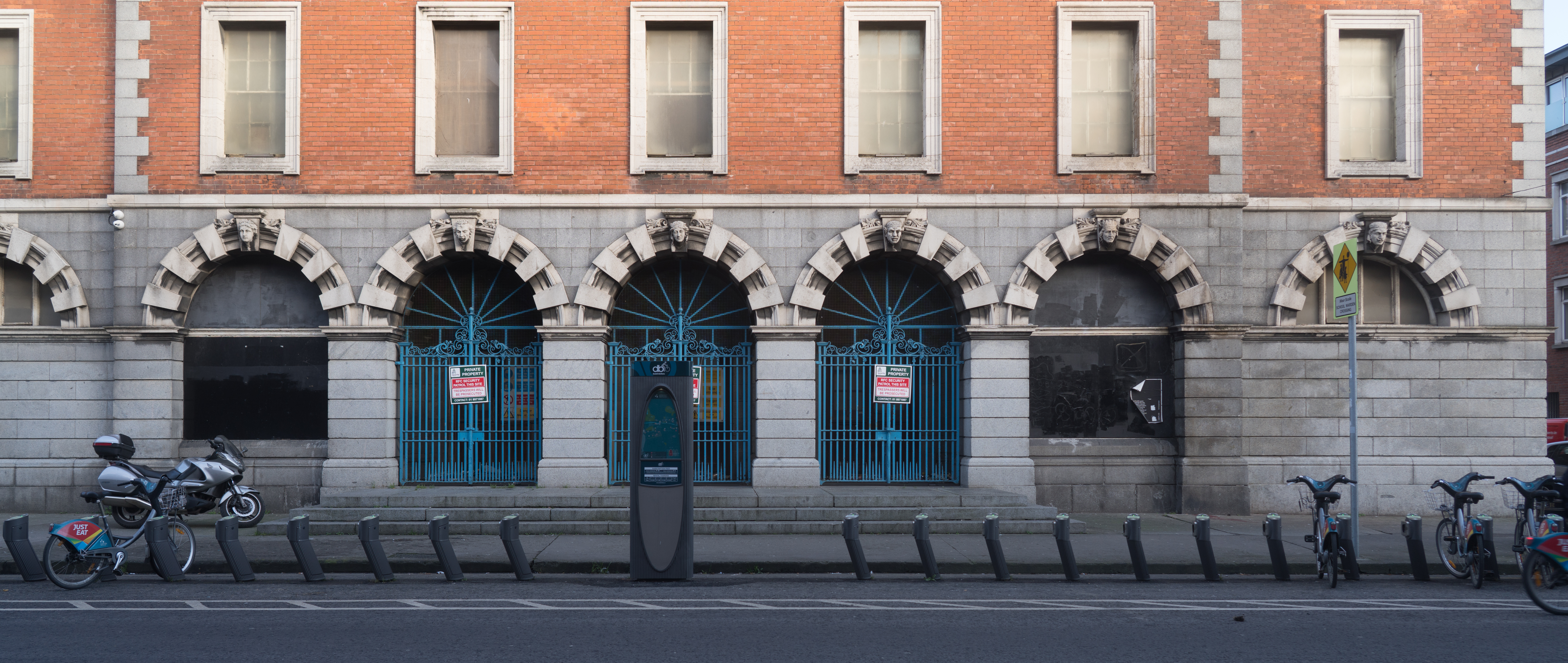
A Dublinbikes docking station in front of the Iveagh Markets building on Francis Street in 2018

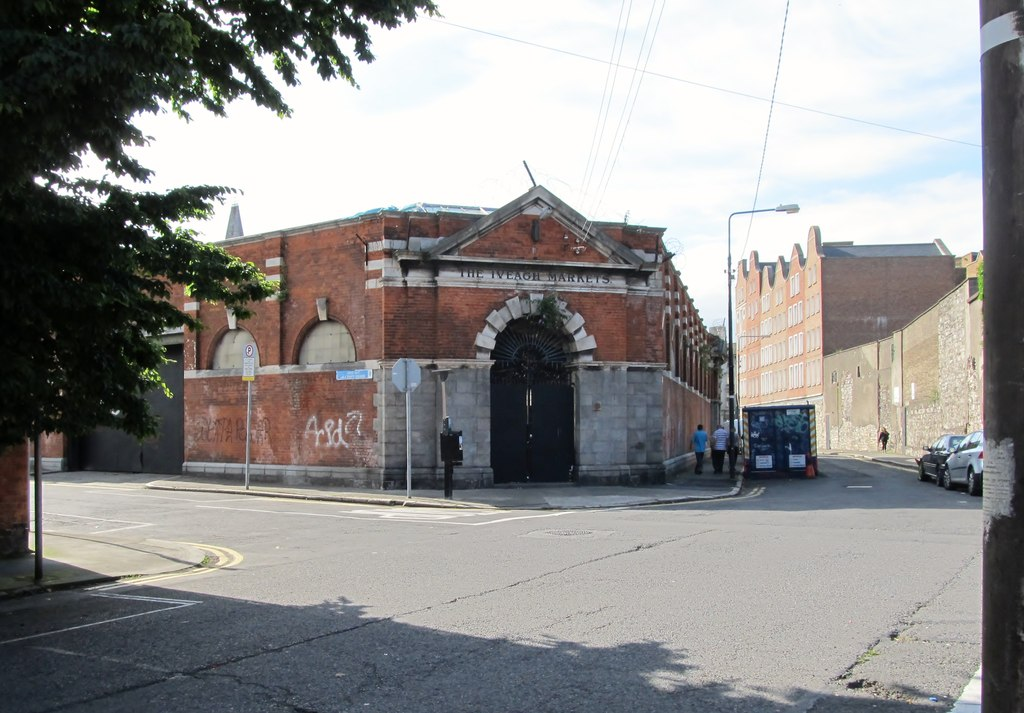
Lamb Alley entrance

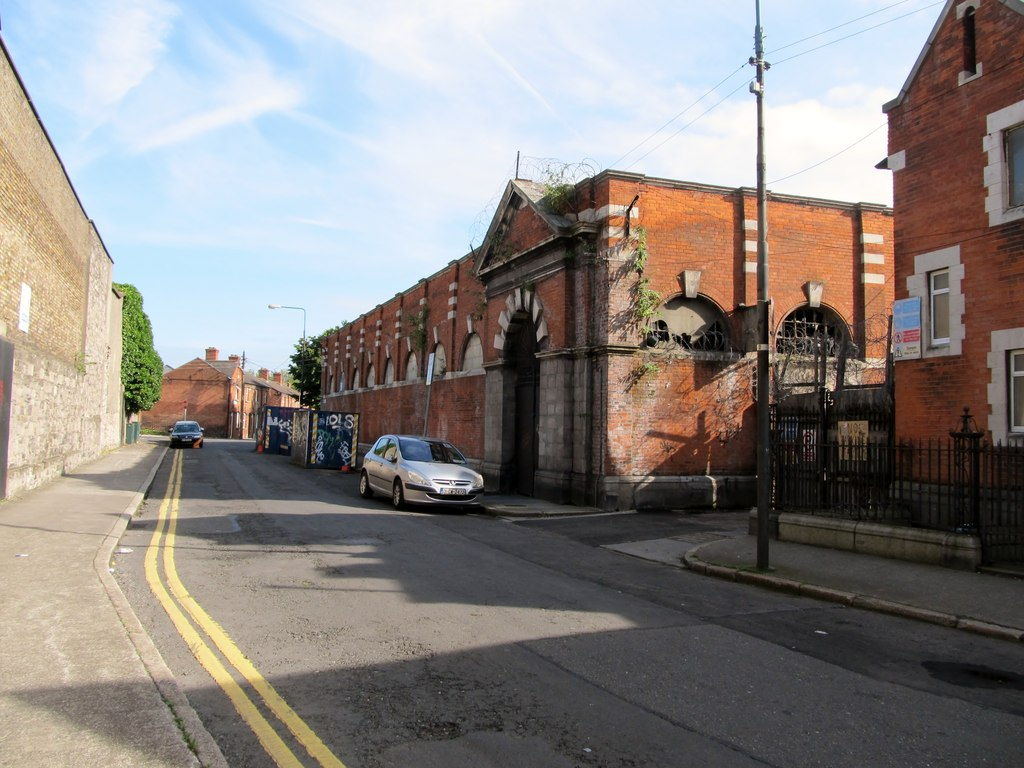
Lamb Alley entrance

== See also ==
- Dublin Corporation Wholesale Markets
- Corn Exchange, Dublin
