= Humphrey Jervis =

English-born property developer and politician (1630–1708)

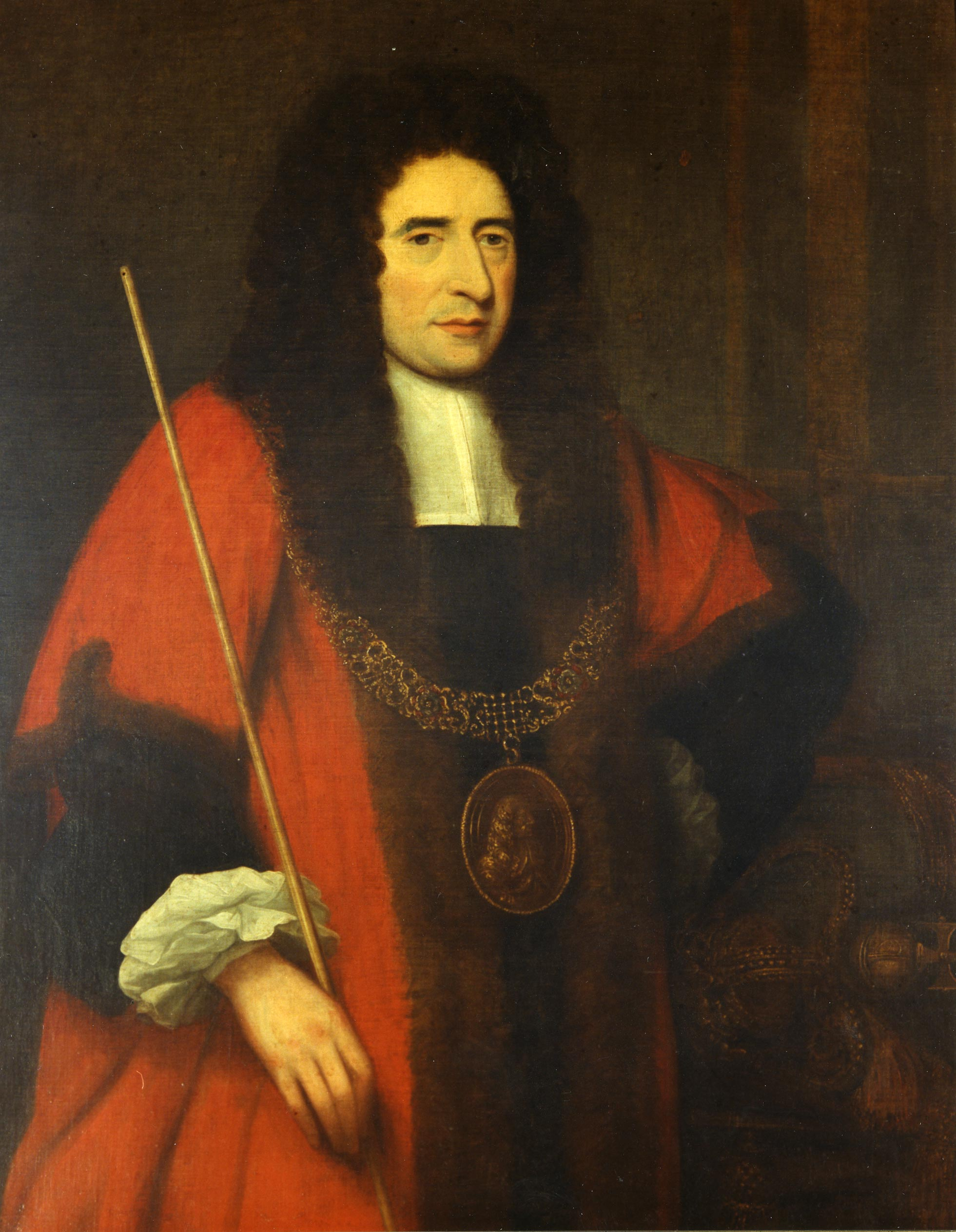
- Portrait by Thomas Pooley, 1681
- Born: 1630; Ollerton, Shropshire
- Died: 1708 (aged 77–78); Dublin, Ireland
- Resting place: St Mary's Church, Mary Street, Dublin
- Occupations: Merchant, ship-owner, property developer, politician
- Known for: Developing various streets on Dublin's northside and Grattan Bridge
- Spouse: Katherine Walsh

Humphrey Jervis (1630–1708) was an English-born merchant, ship-owner, property developer and politician who served as the Lord Mayor of Dublin from 1681 to 1682. He was one of the first notable private developers in the history of Dublin.

== Life ==
Jervis was born in 1630 in Ollerton, Shropshire. He was one of the younger sons of John Jervys of Chatkyll near Eccleshall in Staffordshire and Elizabeth Jervys. He was baptized at the Church of All Saints in Standon, Staffordshire on the 11 July 1630. He was a ship-owner and merchant as well as an architect and later a freeman of the city of Dublin. Jervis' own house was located at the corner of Mary Street and Capel Street and is described during the 1670s as 'the great mansion house of St Mary's Abbey'. He later built a house in what are now the grounds of Belcamp Park at some stage in the 1680s. He served as the Lord Mayor of Dublin from 1681 to 1682. He was knighted for his services in 1681.

He was a member of the Irish house of commons for the Lanesborough constituency in County Longford, 1692–3, and in 1695 came to the house as a petitioner seeking compensation for the cost of the bridges he had built across the Liffey, a matter that had caused him to spend ten months in debtors prison in 1678, by his own account his credit was ruined as a result, and he suffered great financial losses. After later removing from corporate affairs in 1705 he died in 1708 and was buried in St Mary's Church, Mary Street, Dublin on 6 January 1708.

The Jervis family name is derived in origin from Gervasius de Standon, a descendant of Brien de Standon who came to England with William the Conqueror and was awarded lands in Staffordshire by the nobleman Robert de Stafford, a member of the house of Tosny. It was during the reign of Henry III that Gervasius would inherit the lands at Standon, but by the time of the reign of Edward III the family had also acquired property at Chatculm, thus the de Standon name would be dropped, and Gervays de Chatculme is seen to be bearer in name and property for this line. A few generations further down the family would become known as Jervis. .

=== Marriages and issue ===
Sir Humphrey Jervis was first married to Katherine Walsh ( - d. 1673), the daughter of city Alderman Robert Walsh. Secondly to Elizabeth Lane (b. Abt. 1640 – d. 1687), daughter of Col. John Lane (b. 1609 – d. 1667) MP of the parish of Bentley and Hyde Walsall in Staffordshire who assisted his sister Jane Lane, Lady Fisher (c. 1626 - 9 September 1689) in the escape of Charles II after the Battle of Worcester in 1641.

Jervis had three sons and four daughters. His daughter Katherine Jervis married John White of Ballyellis in County Wexford. Their son John Jervis White took on the name as part of his inheritance and became great-grandfather of the 1st Baronet Sir John Jervis-White-Jervis of Ballyellis, Wexford. Sir Humhrey's daughter Mary married the painter Nevill Pooley, son of the Dublin society portrait painter Thomas Pooley (1646 - 1723) whose portrait of Sir Humphrey Jervis is now held in the archive at Trinity College Dublin.

The Admiral of the fleet Sir John Jervis, 1st Earl of St. Vincent (9 January 1735 – 14 March 1823) an admiral of the Royal Navy was the great-grandson of Sir Humphrey's brother John Jervis (b. 1631).

== Career ==
=== Dublin during the reign of Charles II ===
Humphrey Jervis is notable for having developed the area of Dublin to the north of the River Liffey. It was the first large-scale residential scheme of its kind, born out of his own initiative and funded privately by him, after he and number of associates bought 20 acres of the lands of St. Mary's Abbey in 1674 from Richard Power, 1st Earl of Tyrone, for the sum about £3,000. The main part of Jervis's development comprised a rectangular grid that ran off Capel Street and that included; Jervis Street, Mary Street, Great Britain Street, Liffey Street and Great Strand Street, at the centre of which was St. Mary's Church and graveyard.

The Abbey of St. Mary's had been founded in 1154 for the Savignac Order and was passed on in the 1170s to the Cistercians. At the time it was considered to be the richest Cistercian monastery in Ireland, but it became a casualty of Henry VIII policy on the Dissolution of the Monasteries in about 1539. In 1676, Sir Humphrey approached the Viceroy, who was then Arthur Capell, 1st Earl of Essex, with a view to developing the land and building a bridge across the River Liffey to connect the new development with the old city, which he intended to name in honour of the Viceroy. He was therefore granted permission and the bridge duly became called Essex Bridge after completion. Jervis's new bridge had a drawbridge, or lifting section at one end to allow large boats and ships with masts to sail upstream. It connected with the main thoroughfare of Jervis's development being named Capel Street after the Viceroy's family name that subsequently became one of the most fashionable addresses in Dublin. Essex Bridge was built using the stone from the old abbey, and it became the focal point of Dublin remaining so for more than one hundred years, but after having fallen into disrepair in 1872, it was rebuilt and refashioned, following that it was renamed as Grattan Bridge.

In 1677, James Butler, 1st Duke of Ormonde, was appointed Lord Lieutenant of Ireland instead of Essex and he was also interested in Jervis's development scheme. Ormonde then suggested important modifications, persuading Jervis to interpose a stone quay alongside the river, which he duly did, it is now known as Upper and Lower Ormonde Quay. The houses and warehouses that were planned to reside with their rears alongside the river were then turned around on Ormonde's suggestion, so that they faced the river. A market was also laid out and called Ormonde Market, but only survived up until 1890. It had a central rotunda and some seventy stalls. It was replaced by Ormond Square in 1917. But the suggestions made by the Viceroy were of immense importance to the future development of Dublin, as it was this prototype that inspired the whole system of quays in their final beauty. Dublin might otherwise have been like so many other towns through which the river slinks shamefacedly between tall buildings, which would give it no chance to be seen. Another bridge known as Ormonde Bridge was later on erected by Jervis and named in honour of Ormonde, but as it was a timber bridge it was fragile in its construction, it was also too close to Essex Bridge rendering it later unnecessary. When it was ruined by the floods of 1802 it was not rebuilt. It was therefore replaced later on by Richmond Bridge, which now occupies a more westerly site today.

Today a shopping centre in the central grid area that Jervis developed now takes its name as the Jervis Shopping centre, alongside which runs Jervis Street.

Civic offices
| Preceded by Luke Lowther | Lord Mayor of Dublin; 1681–1683 | Succeeded by Sir Elias Best |
