= Hector Grey =

Scottish street trader (1904-1985)

- Born: Alexander Thomson Scott; 14 January 1904; Bowling, Dumbarton, Scotland, UK
- Died: 11 August 1985 (aged 81); Portland Square, Dublin, Ireland
- Occupations: street trader and company director
- Known for: founder of Hector Grey Ltd

Hector Grey (14 January 1904 – 11 August 1985) was a Scottish street trader and company director in Ireland.

== Early life and family ==
Hector Grey was born Alexander Thomson Scott in Bowling, Dumbarton, Scotland on 14 January 1904. He was one of the 13 children of John Scott. Grey attended elementary school until he was 15 years old, becoming a cabin boy on a tramp steamer on routes around Asia. While working on these routes he met traders in Japan, Hong Kong and Guangzhou, learning haggling and street trading skills. He learnt how to speak four languages. Grey arrived in Dublin in 1928, living first in the Iveagh hostel where it is claimed he earned money by selling racing tips in Foster Place, College Green. It was in Dublin that he changed his name to Hector Grey, after the similarly named New Zealand jockey. Due to his alternative way of life, he changed his name so as not to "disgrace the family name". On 6 October 1930, he married Annabella McCain. The couple had two daughters and three sons.

== Career ==
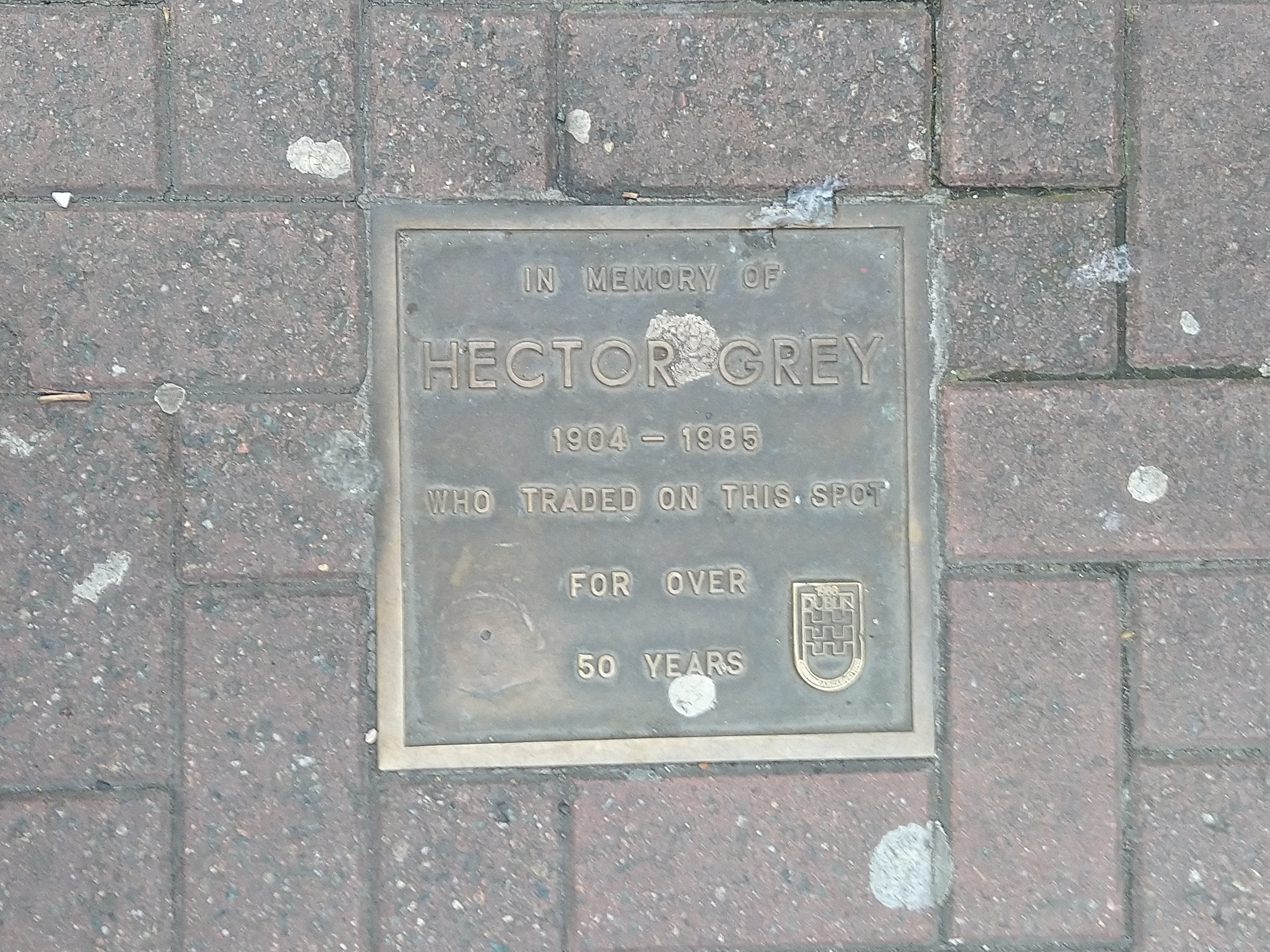
The plaque to Grey, unveiled in 1988

Beginning his career as a street trader in the early 1930s, Grey became famous for his ability to garner the attention of a crowd. He sold "fancy goods" and novelties from Asia from a brown attaché case on a pitch outside the Dublin Woollen Mills near Ha'penny Bridge, with which he became synonymous. He was able to buy a large premises at 57 Middle Abbey Street in 1942, becoming a manufacturer's agent from this address. His time in Asia made him passionate for travel, becoming one the first Europeans to travel to the People's Republic of China having accepted an invitation to a trade fair. Using the contacts he made on this trip as well as fostering new ones allowed him to develop his business rapidly, adding 1-2 Liffey Street to his business premises. By this time he was both a wholesaler and a retailer, expanding his stock to deal in toys. The Middle Abbey Street business was later moved to Mary Street.

Grey had four shops, two warehouses, and an international import and export business by 1960. At the height of his business, it is thought he sold a million pounds' worth of toys over the Christmas period. He bought a mansion, Beeches, Grange Road, and 14 acres at Raheny. Despite his success, Grey was most at home at his pitch near the Ha'penny Bridge or at the Liffey market on Sundays. In 1969, Grey retired from running Hector Grey Ltd, at which time the company had made him a millionaire and had 100 employees. After retirement he remained a consultant and director of the company, and continued to operate a stall every Sunday in the Liffey market until his death. Grey lived at the Beeches, and later a flat in Portland Square. He died in his flat on 11 August 1985. Prominent figures from business, politics, and the Garda Síochána attended his funeral. Owing to his fame, the cortège filed past the Ha'penny Bridge as it made its way to the Free Church on Great Charles Street.

A plaque marking the spot of his pitch near the Ha'penny Bridge was unveiled in 1988. The last of Hector Grey's former shops, which traded until around 2006, was demolished in 2019.
