= Volta Cinematograph =

Former film theatre in Dublin, Ireland

Volta Electric Theatre
- Cinematograph Volta; Lyceum Picture Theatre
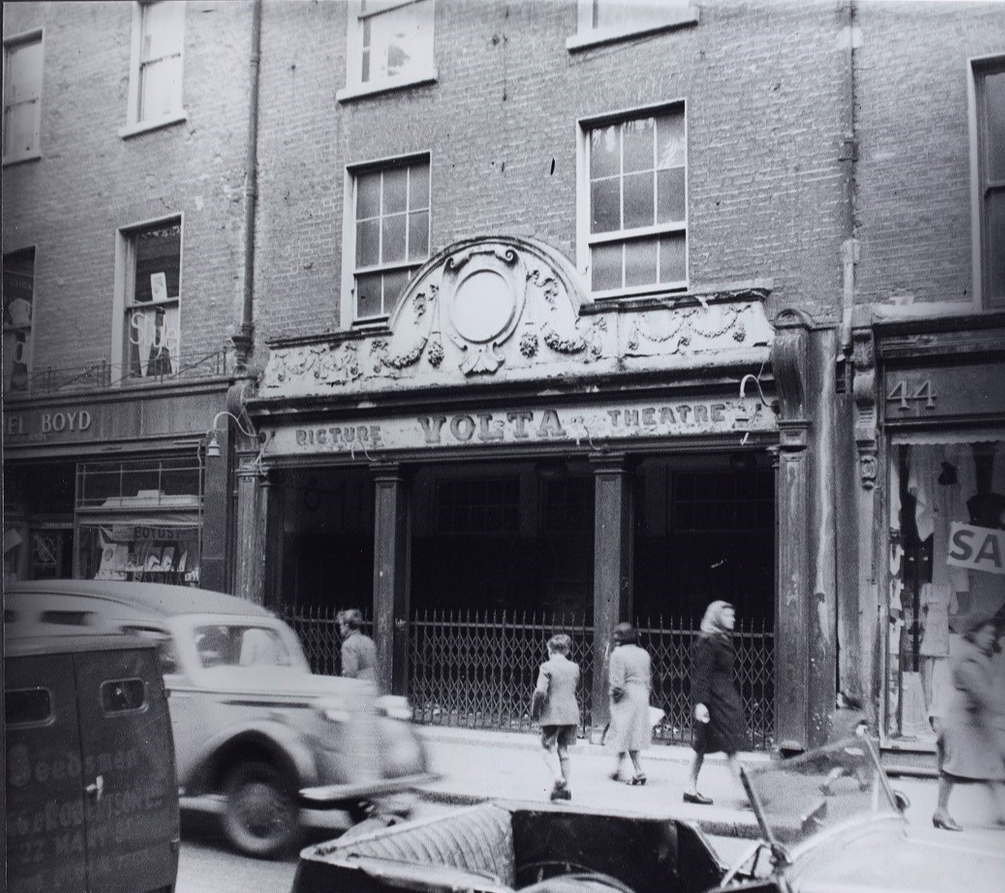
- Volta Cinema, 45 Mary Street, Dublin 1

- Location within Central Dublin
- Address: 45 Mary Street; Dublin; Ireland
- Coordinates: 53.348986°N 6.265883°W
- Capacity: 600
- Type: Cinema
- Screen: 1
- Current use: Demolished

Construction
- Opened: 20 December 1909
- Closed: 1948
- Reopened: 1921

The Volta Electric Theatre (later renamed the Lyceum Picture Theatre) was a film theatre in Dublin and was Ireland's first dedicated cinema. The site at 45 Mary Street was later demolished and is occupied today by a department store.

In the early 1900s, demand for moving pictures was fierce and cinemas were springing up all over the world. After visiting Trieste, the writer James Joyce was determined to bring a cinema to Ireland, so after receiving the backing of his Italian friends, he set up the Cinematograph Volta on Mary Street. It opened its doors on 20 December 1909. The opening night featured an eclectic program, with the comedy Devilled Crab, the mystery Bewitched Castle, La Pourponièrre, The First Paris Orphanage, and The Tragedy of Beatrice Cency. A popular actor was Charlie Chaplin.

Joyce soon became disillusioned with the venture, as the cinema mainly showed films from Europe and Italy, which were largely shunned by Dubliners at the time. After seven months, Joyce withdrew his involvement and the cinema was sold to the British Provincial Cinema Company. The cinema stayed open until 1919.

In 1921, it was reopened as the Lyceum Picture Theatre following alterations which increased seating from 420 to 600. In the 1940s, Capitol and Allied Theatres Ltd. acquired the cinema; however, it closed its doors for the last time in 1948. Although it survived almost 40 years, the cinema was rarely successful.

Penneys bought the building along with adjacent shops and built a department store on the demolished site. For many years the site of Ireland's first cinema was unknown to many as there was no plaque to commemorate it. However, on 12 June 2007, a plaque was unveiled on the original site marking the significance of 45 Mary Street.

A connection between the name and cinema in Ireland still remains. Volta is a streaming service for mainly Irish content hosted on a platform provided by Shift72.

== Sources ==
- The Cambridge History of Twentieth-Century English Literature (New York: Cambridge University Press, 2004) (at 342-343)
- Kevin Rockett, Luke Gibbons and John Hill, Cinema and Ireland (Croom Helm, 1987) (at 5-6)
- Bruce Stewart, James Joyce (Oxford University Press, 2007) (at 48-49)
- The Jameson Dublin International Film Festival, "Volta Award"
