= Samuel Croker-King =

Irish surgeon, first President of the RCSI

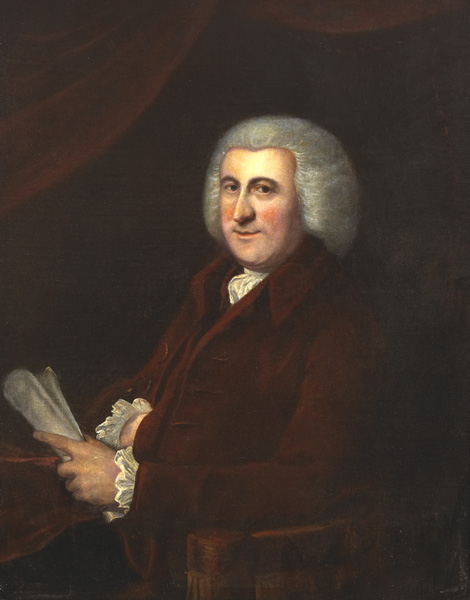
- Samuel Croker-King. Oil on canvas, n.d. Anonymous. Private collection.
- Born: 28 June 1728; Dublin
- Died: 12 January 1817 (age 89); Dublin
- Known for: Sixty years service at Doctor Steevens' Hospital, Dublin; First president of the Royal College of Surgeons in Ireland (RCSI); Invented own trepanning device

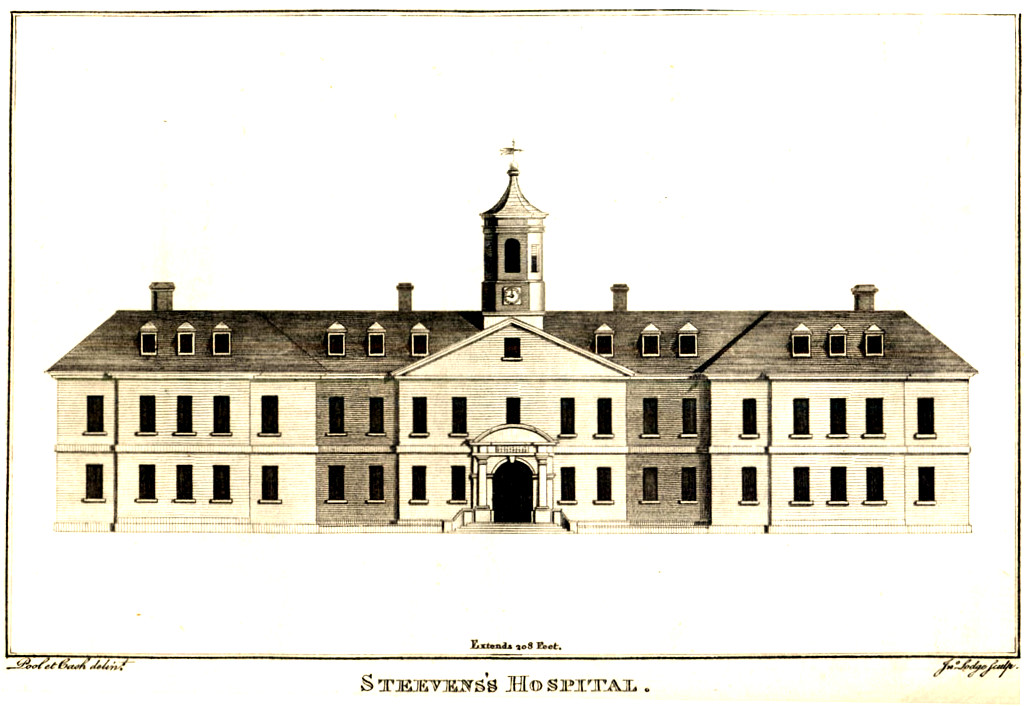
Dr. Steevens' Hospital in 1780

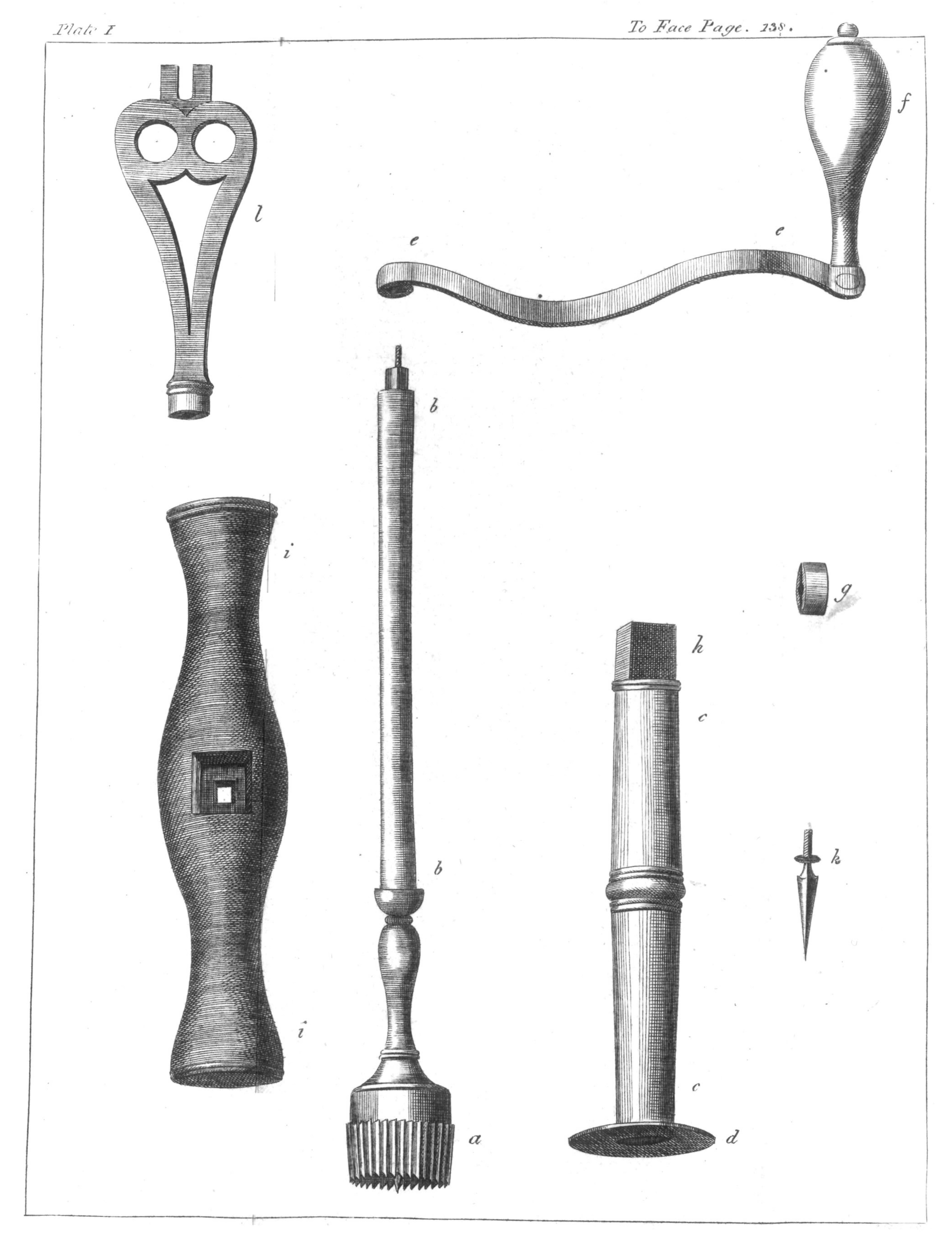
Parts of Croker-King's trepanning instrument

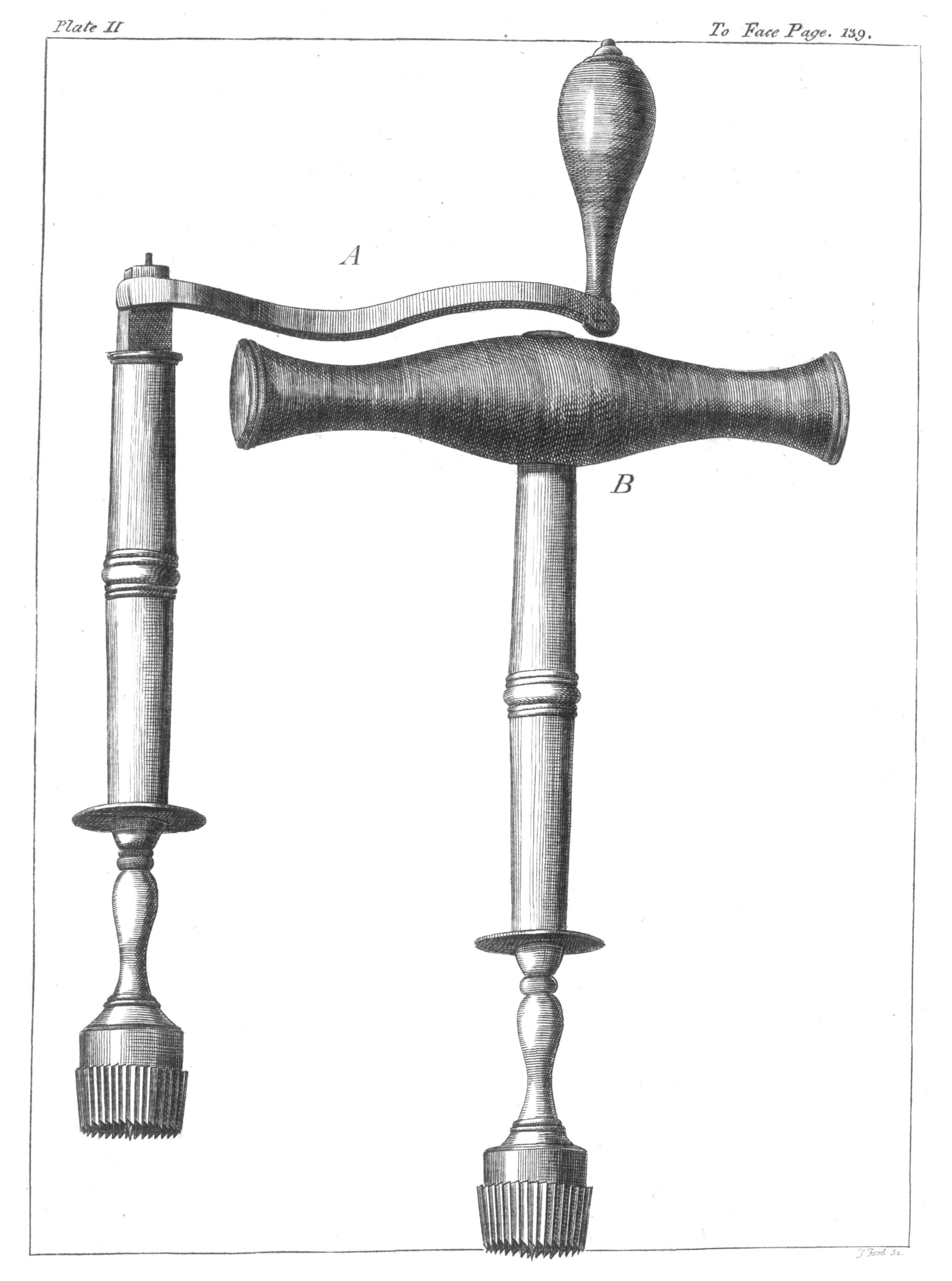
Croker-King's trepanning instrument configured for use as a trepan (A) and as a trephine (B)

Samuel Croker-King (28 June 1728 – 12 January 1817) was an Irish surgeon who was associated with Doctor Steevens' Hospital in Dublin for sixty years. He was the first president of the Royal College of Surgeons in Ireland (RCSI), from 1784 to 1785. He is thought to have saved the life of the child who became the Duke of Wellington. He invented his own trepanning device.

== Early life ==
Samuel Croker-King was born in the city of Dublin on 28 June 1728. His family hailed from Devonshire in England, and had been in the area for so long that a local distich reads that:

"The Crokers, Crewys, and Coletons,
When the Conqueror came were at home."

The first of the Croker family to travel to Ireland was Sir John Croker, who was cup-bearer to William III, a position which probably explains why the Crokers' crest is a goblet with two fleurs-de-lis. Jane King gave her property to Croker on condition that he added her name to his own which was done by letters patent in around 1761.

Croker-King married the noted beauty Miss Obre, and they resided for many years in the then fashionable Jervis Street.

== Career ==
Croker-King served his apprenticeship under surgeon-general Nichols. His first professional appointment was as surgeon to Steevens' Hospital in 1758, an establishment of which he later became a visiting surgeon and governor. As such, he was intimately acquainted with the procedures and rules of the hospital and The Gilbert Collection of the Dublin City Library contains the manuscript of his 1785 history of the hospital and description of its operations. This was published in book form by P. Dixon Hardy & Sons of Dublin in 1854, after Croker-King's death. In 1816 he gave evidence about the duties of the apothecary at the hospital, noting that in addition to preparing the medicines and dressings required by the hospital's physicians and surgeons, the apothecary was responsible for seeing that medicines were taken, had to be constantly at the hospital, and "especially" was required to sleep at the hospital every night.

In addition to Steevens' Hospital, Croker-King was surgeon to the Rotunda Hospital, to the Revenue Department, and to the Hospital for Venereal Diseases in North King Street.

Croker-King was one of 49 physicians and chirurgeons who declared their public support for the construction of a Publick Bath in Dublin in May 1771 and named Achmet Borumborad as a well qualified individual for carrying such a scheme into existence.

His patients came mainly from the upper classes as shown by his fee-book which includes the noble houses of Charlemont, Enniskillen, Farnham, Howth, Leitrim, Tyrone, and Westmeath. The surgeon J. W. Cusack said of Croker-King, "He lived by the nobility and great landed proprietors, whilst I live by the people", adding, "but I make more money than he did."

Croker-King was the first president of the Royal College of Surgeons in Ireland (RCSI), from 1784 to 1785.

== Incidents ==
He was credited with saving the life of the child who became the Duke of Wellington (1769–1852) after the child was brought to him following an incorrect diagnosis by a country doctor.

In May 1791, Croker-King read a paper before the Royal Irish Academy which was subsequently published in their transactions as "Description of an Instrument for Performing the Operation of Trepanning the Skull, with More Ease, Safety and Expedition, than Those Now in General Use". In the paper he observed that surgical instruments had greatly improved in the present century with the exception of those used for trepanning, a procedure often required due to the frequency of accidents but which was difficult to carry out due to the nature of the instruments available and the "difficulty in keeping the patient quiet". If the operation went wrong and the brain was damaged, death might result.

In order to remedy the defects of existing devices, Croker-King had developed his own trepanning device which had been built specially for him by John Read, a cutlery and instrument maker of Skinner Row, Dublin. It could be used either as a trepan or as a trephine and did not require any force or pressure to cut through the skull, thus avoiding the risk of accidentally damaging the brain. Croker-King wrote that he and other surgeons in Dublin had already used the device successfully.

Fellow physician, John Gilborne, wrote verse in praise of Croker-King in 1775 as follows which mentions his use of the trepan:

"The fractur'd Skull, to Samuel Croker-King,
The broken Limb, Wounds, and Luxations bring;
There's no Disaster but he can set right,
With Splints, Trepan, and Bandage not too tight."

== Death and legacy ==
After sixty years at Doctor Steeven's Hospital, Croker-King died in North Cumberland Street, Dublin, on 12 January 1817, and was buried at St Mary's churchyard. A painting showing him wearing a crimson velvet coat, with lace ruffles and a powdered wig, passed to Charles Croker-King, his grandson and a fellow of the RCSI. An unsigned portrait of Croker is in the collection of the RCSI at their headquarters at Stephen's Green, Dublin. A similar painting was sold by Whyte's of Dublin in 2013.

== Selected publications ==
- A Short History of the Hospital Founded by Doctor Richard Steevens, near the City of Dublin, from its Establishment in the Year 1717 to the Present Time 1785. P. Dixon Hardy & Sons, Dublin, 1854.
- "Description of an Instrument for Performing the Operation of Trepanning the Skull, with More Ease, Safety and Expedition, than Those Now in General Use", Transactions of the Royal Irish Academy, Vol. 4 (1790–1792), pp. 119–139.
