= Jervis Shopping Centre =

Mid-size shopping centre in central Dublin, Ireland

- Atrium
- Location: Dublin, Ireland
- Coordinates: 53°20′54″N 6°15′56″W
- Opened: October 7, 1996; 30 years ago
- Owner: Cross Ocean Partners
- Architect: James Toomey architects
- Num. of stores: 90
- Num. of anchor tenants: 4
- Floor area: 35,766 square metres (380,000 sq ft)
- Floors: 3
- Parking: 750
- Website: jervis.ie

The Jervis Shopping Centre is a major shopping centre in Dublin, Ireland. Opened in 1996, the centre is located in the area bordered by Jervis Street, Upper Abbey Street, Mary Street, and Liffey Street. The centre has more than 90 retail units including clothing, food and electrical outlets.

== History ==
The centre was built on a 12,000 m^{2} (3-acre) former hospital site, which was bought in 1994 at a cost of £5.97 million. The centre was built at a cost of £76 million. Most of the facade of the former Hospital was retained and incorporated into the Shopping Centre. The centre opened in 1996 and extends to more than 35,766 m^{2}. The centre was originally anchored by Debenhams, Marks & Spencer and Quinnsworth, and contains a 750-space car park. The property is located on Mary Street, one of Ireland's busiest streets.

Although its main entrance is on Mary Street, the centre is named for the Jervis Street Hospital on whose site it was built following the hospital's closure in the late-1980s. The existing Marks and Spencer shop on Mary Street was incorporated into the new centre, with the other anchor tenants being Quinnsworth (now Tesco) in the unit formerly occupied by Debenhams.

The centre is notable in that, as the first major shopping centre opened during the economic boom of the late-1990s, it marked the first appearance of many British retailers on main streets in Ireland. These included: Boots, Dixons, Debenhams, Next, and Argos among others, some of which have gone on to become major names in Ireland. This contrasted with existing Irish shopping centres at the time which were usually anchored by Irish retailers such as Dunnes, Roches Stores (since taken over by Debenhams), and Penneys. Not all of the new arrivals were successful. British Home Stores opened a shop in 1996 having previously sold all of their Irish interests to Penneys; however, the outlet was not a success and was later sold to Heatons.

The centre was one of the first to introduce the food court concept to Ireland, with outlets including: KFC, Spud U Like, and Harry Ramsden's. Other major restaurants in the centre include Burger King. The centre is owned by Paddy McKillen, Padraig Drayne and Paschal Taggart.

In March 2025, it was reported that the centre was to be offered for sale for €120 million with Frasers Group and Starwood Capital Group interested in the centre. The centre was acquired by Cross Ocean Partners in later in 2025, with Pradera appointed as asset manager.

By July 2026, the centre struggled with vacancy rates, being more than 30% vacant, asset manager Pradera intends to focus the centre on food and entertainment alongside retail.

== Public transport ==
The shopping centre is on the Luas Red line, with the Jervis Luas stop right outside the building.
