= Dublin Corporation Wholesale Markets =

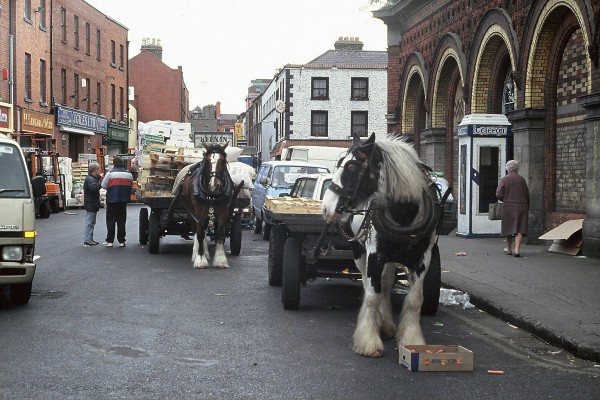
- The market in operation in 1993
- Interactive map of the Dublin Corporation Wholesale Markets area
- Alternative names: Dublin City Fruit, Vegetable and Flower Market, Victorian Fruit and Vegetable Market

General information
- Status: Protected structure
- Type: Market
- Architectural style: Victorian
- Location: Smithfield, Dublin, Ireland
- Coordinates: 53.3481°N 6.2712°W
- Opened: 6 December 1892
- Owner: Dublin City Council (as of 2022)

Technical details
- Material: Limestone, red brick, cast iron, terracotta
- Floor area: 50,300 m^{2} (541,000 sq ft)

Design and construction
- Architects: Parke Neville, Spencer Harty (City Engineer)
- Developer: Dublin Corporation
- Main contractor: Connelly & Son (Dominick Street)

The Dublin Corporation Wholesale Markets, or Victorian Fruit and Vegetable Market,(laterly the Dublin City Fruit and Vegetable Market) is a market located in the Smithfield area of Dublin in existence from the 6 December 1892 until its closure in 2019. At that point, legacy tenants received compensation and vacated the space to alternative premises to facilitate refurbishments and reopening as a retail and food focused market. In the months following the closure of the market, the onset of COVID-19 resulted in the suspension of the project and the temporary usage of the market to store building materials for nearby construction projects.

The original market was constructed along with an adjacent fish market. This was demolished in the early 2000s and now operates as a car park.

As of 2022, Dublin City Council still intends to re-open the market as a mixed wholesale, retail, fruit and vegetable market with the Time Out Market Lisboa and Borough Market often cited as operating models.

== History ==
The building was planned by the city architect Parke Neville in 1884 but was not executed until after his death by Spencer Harty and William Wilson with modifications. The iron roof was made by J. Lysaght of Bristol while the iron tympana over the doors were made by McGloughlin & Sons.

The building opened on the 6th of December 1892.

=== Building ===
The building was constructed mainly in red brick with some yellow brick lining while the roof is supported by a cast iron frame. The pilasters and elements around the doors and arches such as pediments are from carved limestone while the base of some of the doorways and pillars are made in harder granite to avoid the wear and tear which came with day-to-day market use.

Various pieces of terracotta statuary around the arches and doors reference produce traded at the market such as fish, fruit, vegetables and flowers. Most notably they include the figures of Lady Justice and Trade and the city arms over the Mary's Lane entrance by CW Harrison & Sons.

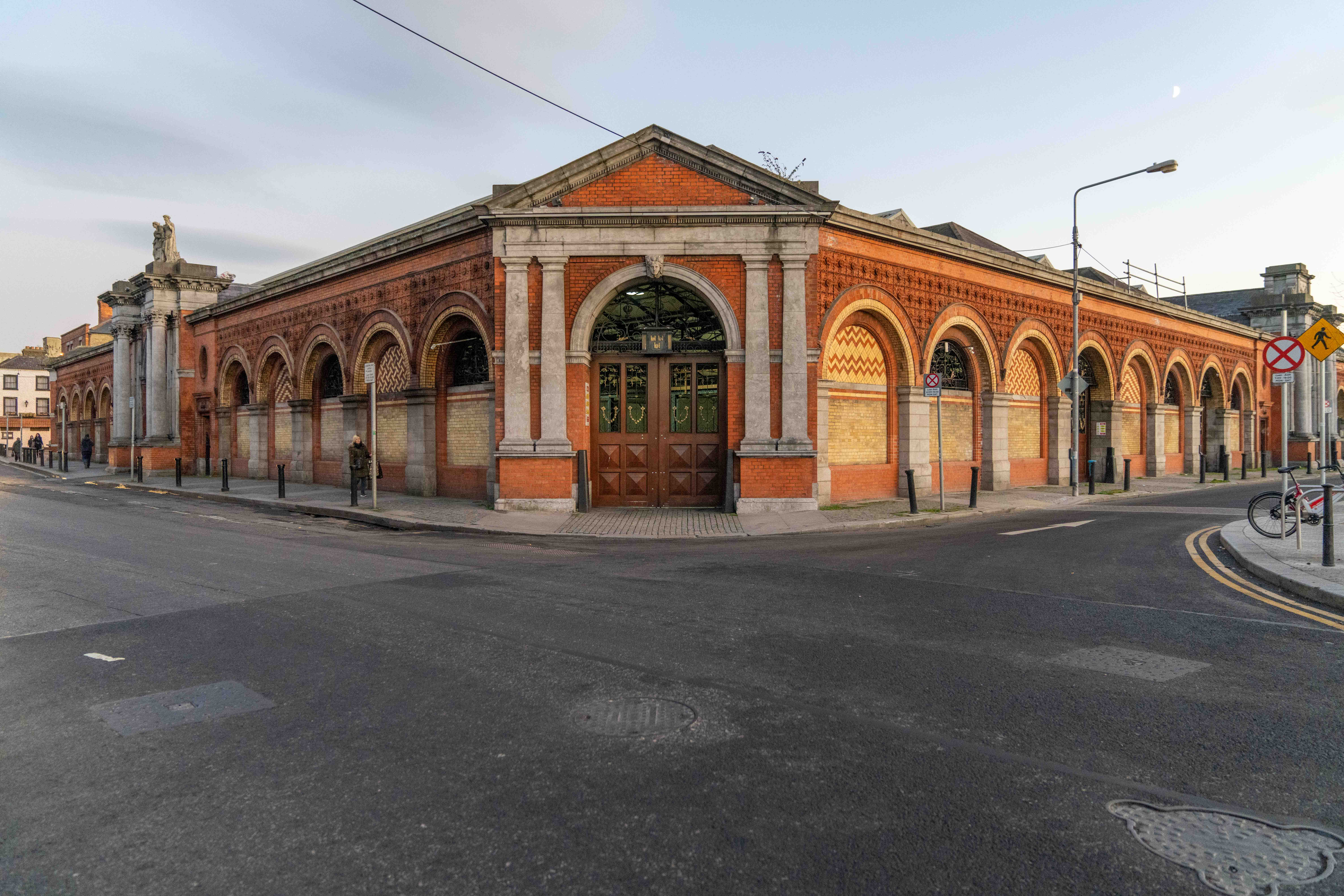
The market in December 2019 just after closure

=== Redevelopment ===
A €30 million redevelopment of the space is scheduled to commence in June 2025.

== See also ==
- Iveagh Markets
- Corn Exchange, Dublin
