= Capel Street =

Street in Dublin, Ireland

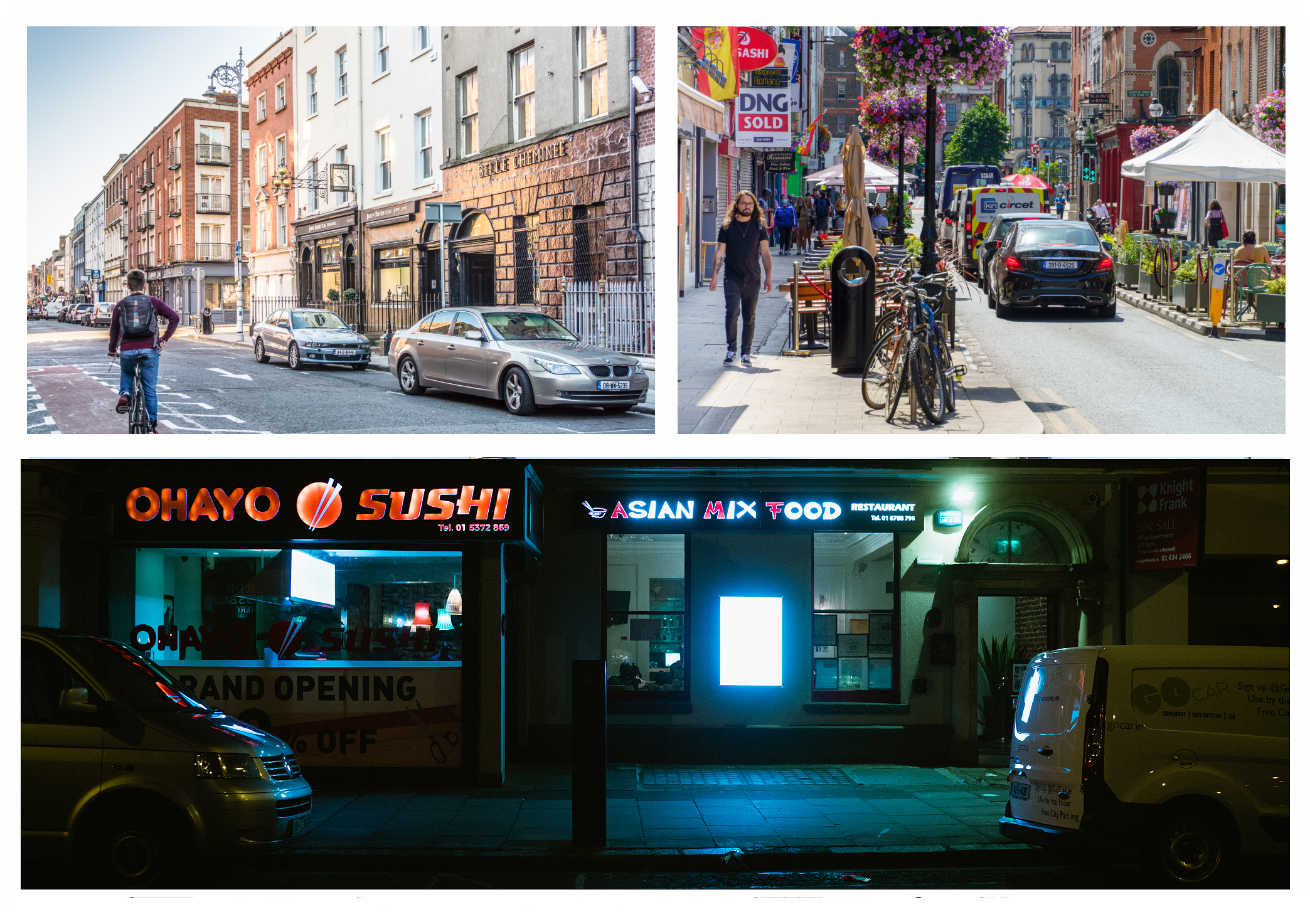
- Clockwise from top: Capel Street near its intersection with Bolton Street; dining terraces outside restaurants and bars; along with Parnell Street, Capel Street is known for its Korean, Japanese, and Chinese eateries.

- Location within Central Dublin
- Native name: Sráid Chéipil (Irish)
- Namesake: Arthur Capell, 1st Earl of Essex
- Length: 600 m (2,000 ft)
- Width: 14 metres (46 ft)
- Location: Dublin, Ireland
- Postal code: D01
- Coordinates: 53.34843°N 6.26874°W
- north end: Bolton Street
- south end: Ormond Quay

Construction
- Completion: 1670s

Other
- Known for: restaurants, shops, cafés and pubs; immigrant community, LGBT community

Capel Street (/ˈkeɪpəl/ Irish: Sráid Chéipil) is a predominantly commercial street in Dublin, Ireland, laid out in the 17th century by Humphrey Jervis.

== History ==
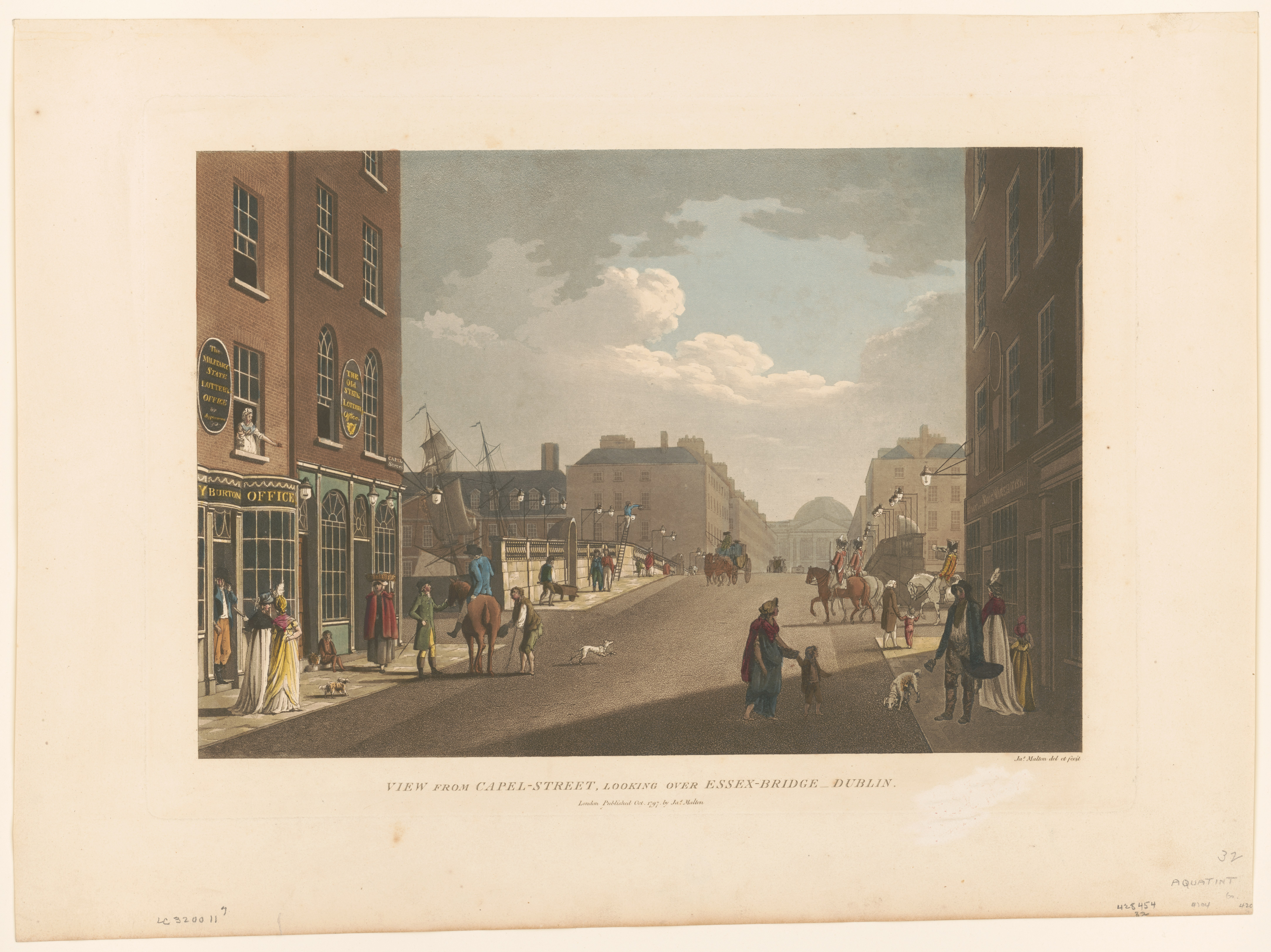
"View from Capel-Street, looking over Essex-Bridge" (Grattan Bridge), 1797. The state lottery offices are visible at left, as is The Old Custom House on the opposite side of the River.

Capel Street takes its name from the nearby chapel of St Mary's Abbey (from the Latin Capella – Chapel) although Arthur Capell, 1st Earl of Essex, Lord Lieutenant of Ireland (1672–1677) may have also later influenced the naming convention.

The street was laid out by Sir Humphrey Jervis in the late 17th century on the Abbey lands he purchased in 1674. Jervis' own house was located at the corner of Mary Street and Capel Street and is described during the 1670s as 'the great mansion house of St Mary's Abbey'.

He also developed Essex Bridge (today Grattan Bridge) connecting up his lands directly with the old city of Dublin and Dublin Castle thereby increasing the attractiveness of his estate North of the river.

The street was a busy thoroughfare known for its mansions. In the 18th century, it became a commercial hub, with two-bay buildings replacing most of the "Dutch Billy" houses.

Today it is known for its variety of restaurants, shops, cafés and pubs; as Panti, the owner of Pantibar put it, "You can buy a lightbulb, sexual lubricant, Brazilian rice, get a pint and go to a trad session".

105 Capel Street, now the Outhouse LGBTQ+ Centre, is part of the original 14-bay terrace house built by Ralph Ward around 1770 and sits on the site of the former mansion of Thomas Connolly.

Louis Copeland's tailor is another notable business on the street.

On 20 May 2022, the street was pedestrianised. It is now the longest traffic-free street in Dublin.

=== Royal mint ===
In 1689, James II of England opened a royal mint in a large newly-built mansion at 27 Capel Street as well as another one at the Deanery in Limerick to make coins to fund his campaign to regain the throne. The mint continued to make coinage after the Battle of the Boyne in 1690 and can be considered to be a descendant organisation to the modern Irish Mint.

Later the actor Thomas Sheridan was born in the same building in 1719.

=== Theatre ===
The Capel Street Theatre stood on the street in the 18th century. Later, the Torch Theatre also operated on Capel Street from 1935 to 1941. In the late 1700s, the Italian composer, Tommaso Giordani, performed at a small purpose-built theatre on the street.

=== Architecture ===
The street affords a terminating vista all the way from the junction with Bolton Street southwards through Parliament Street to Dublin's City Hall. Capel Street is notable for the remains of some "Dutch Billy" houses dating from the 18th century.

== In popular culture ==
=== Folk songs ===
- The Irish folk song "Waxies' Dargle", which originated as a 19th-century children's song, includes a section in which the protagonist visits a pawnbroking shop along Capel Street (a few of which remain to this day).
- The song 'Dynamite' by Irish folk duo Saint Sister references Capel Street.

== Gallery ==
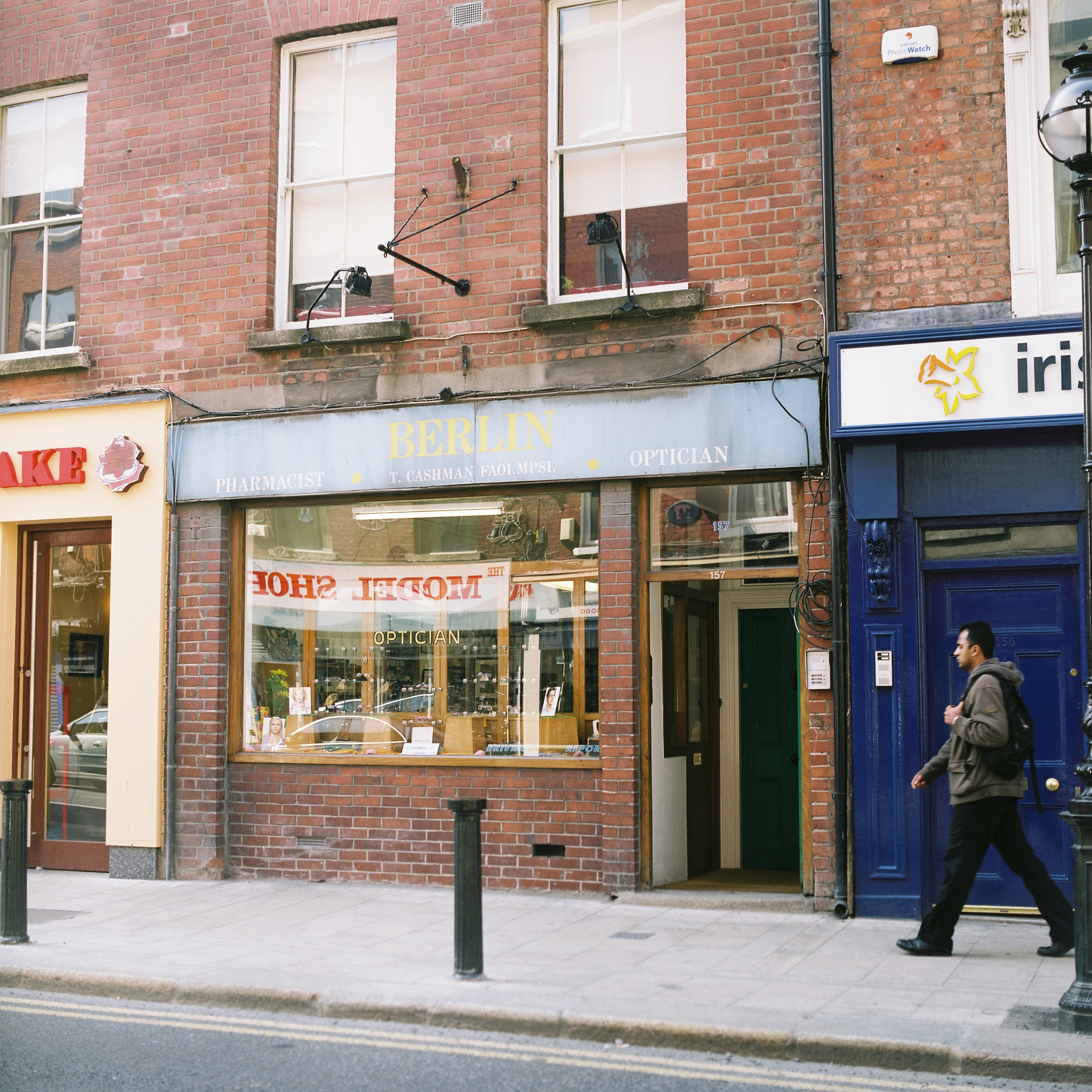
Berlin Optician, 157 Capel Street

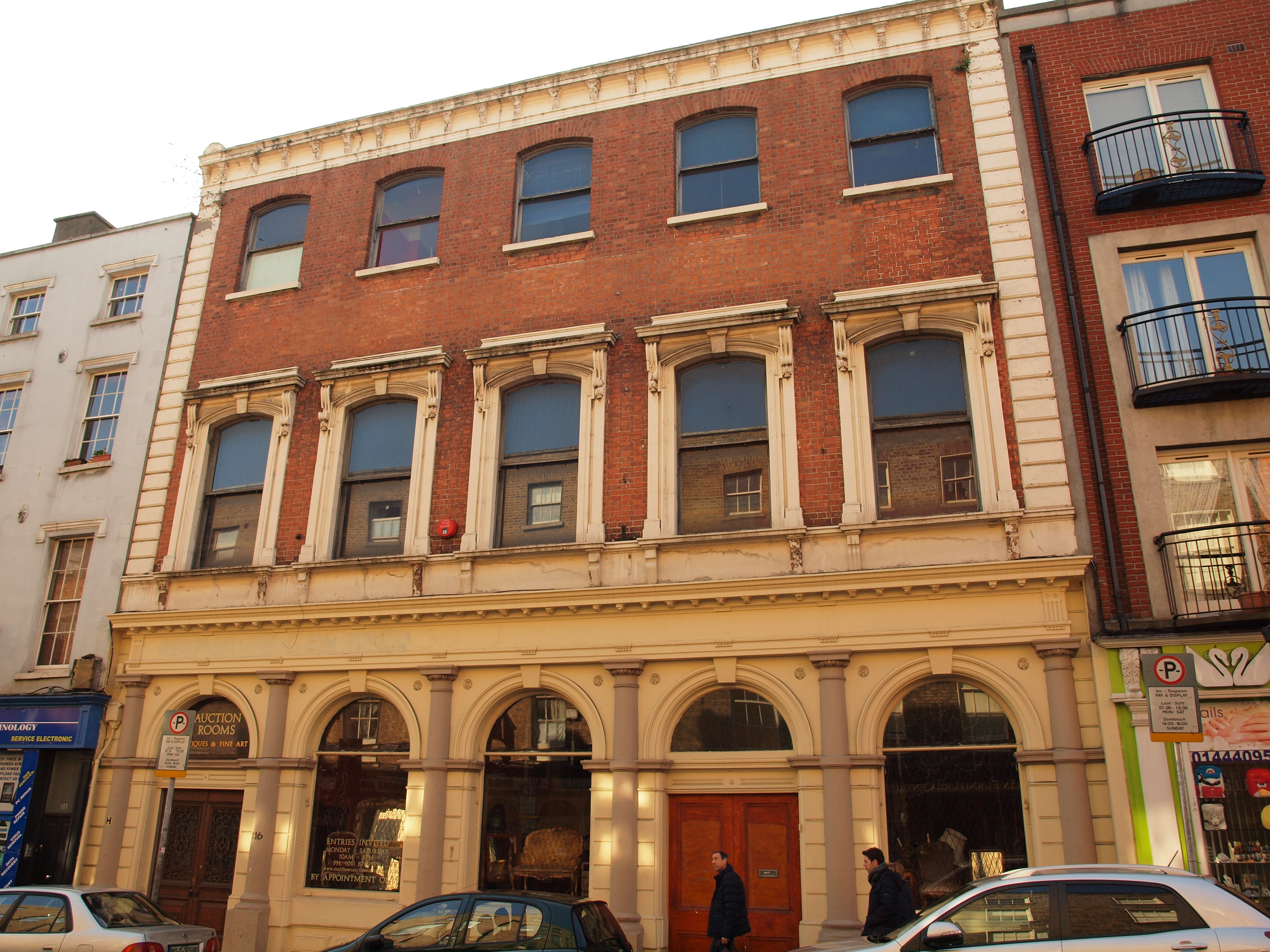
Site of the Torch Theatre, 114–116 Capel Street

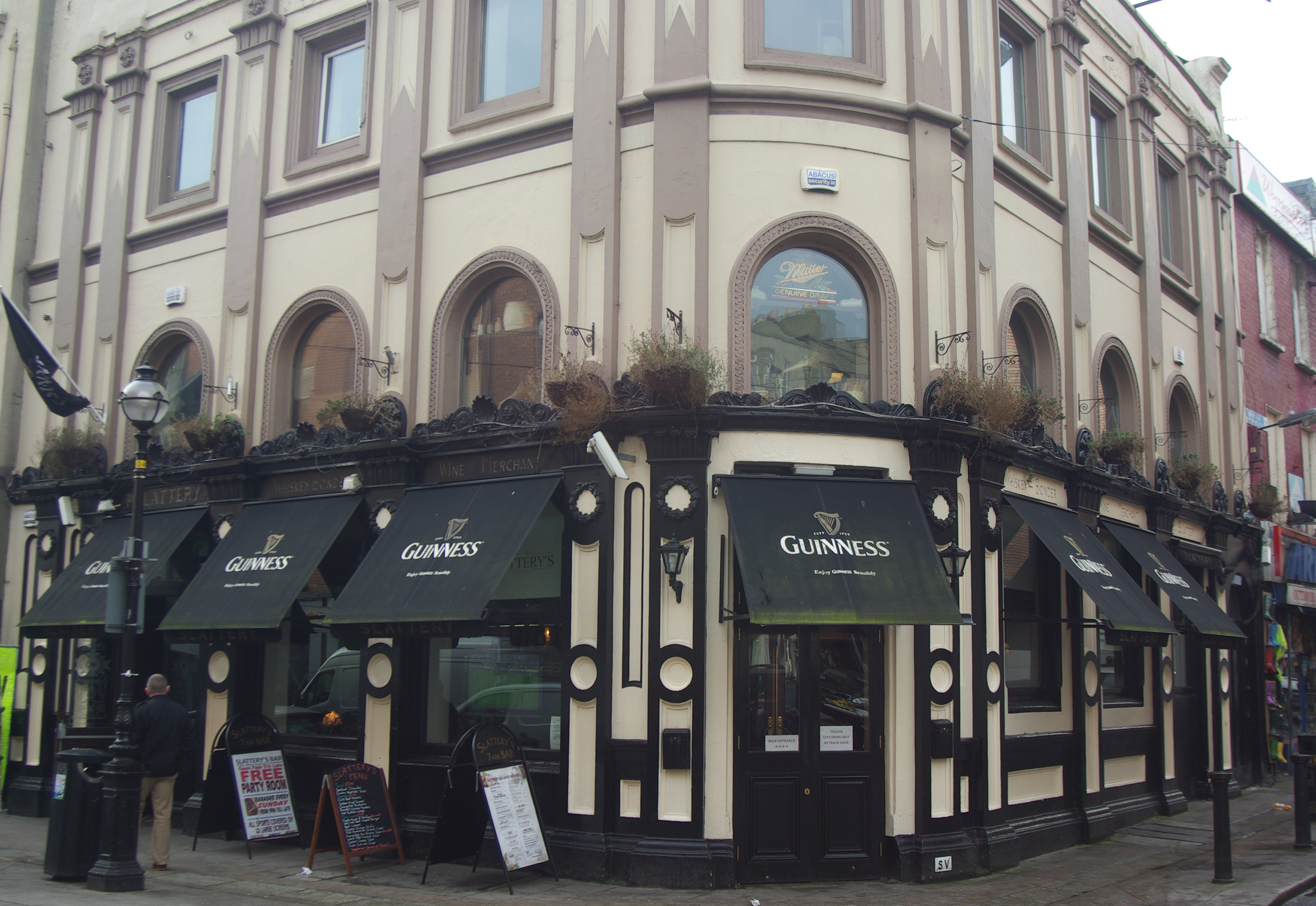
Slattery's Bar, 129 Capel Street

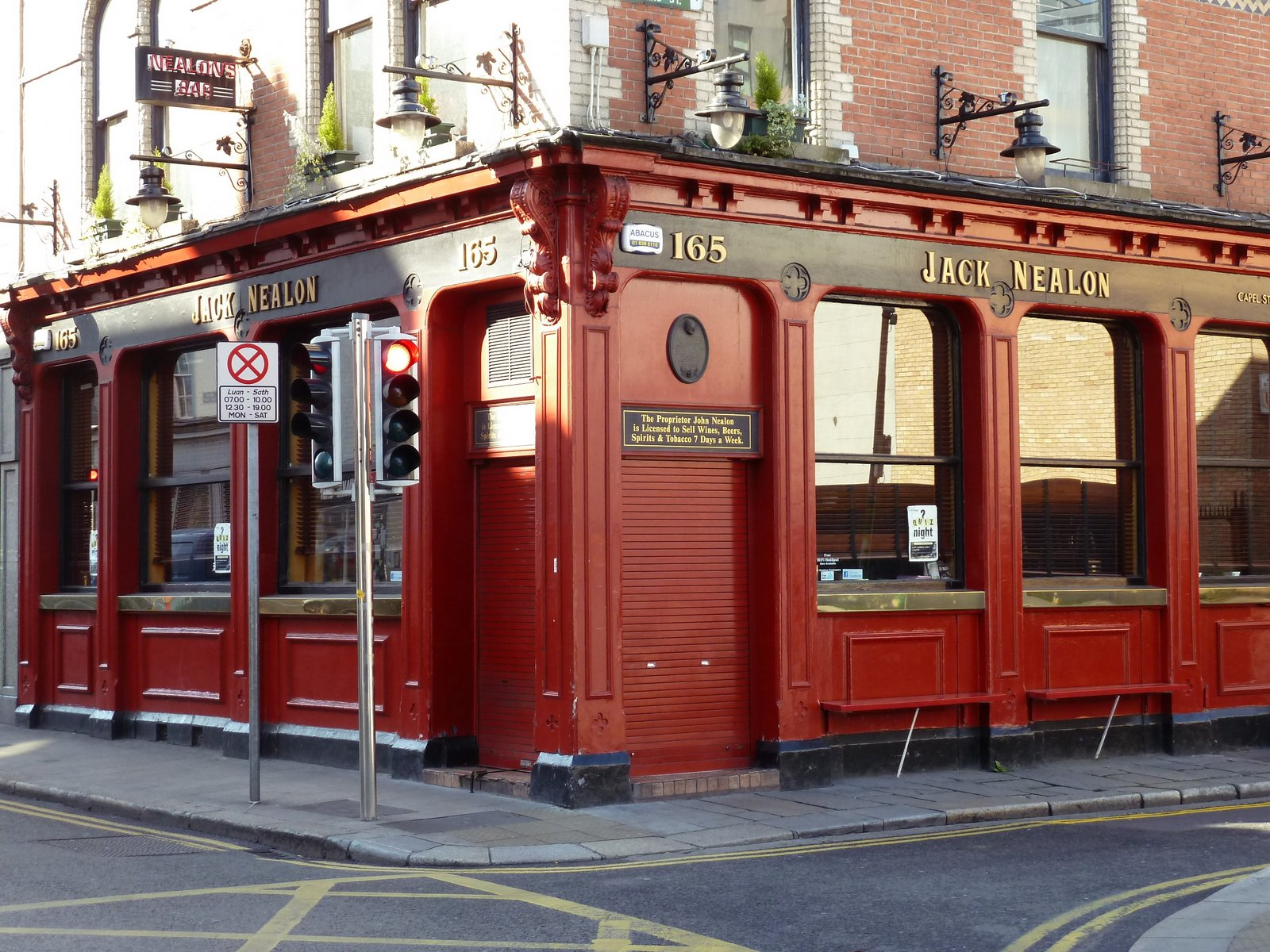
Jack Nealon's pub, 165 Capel Street

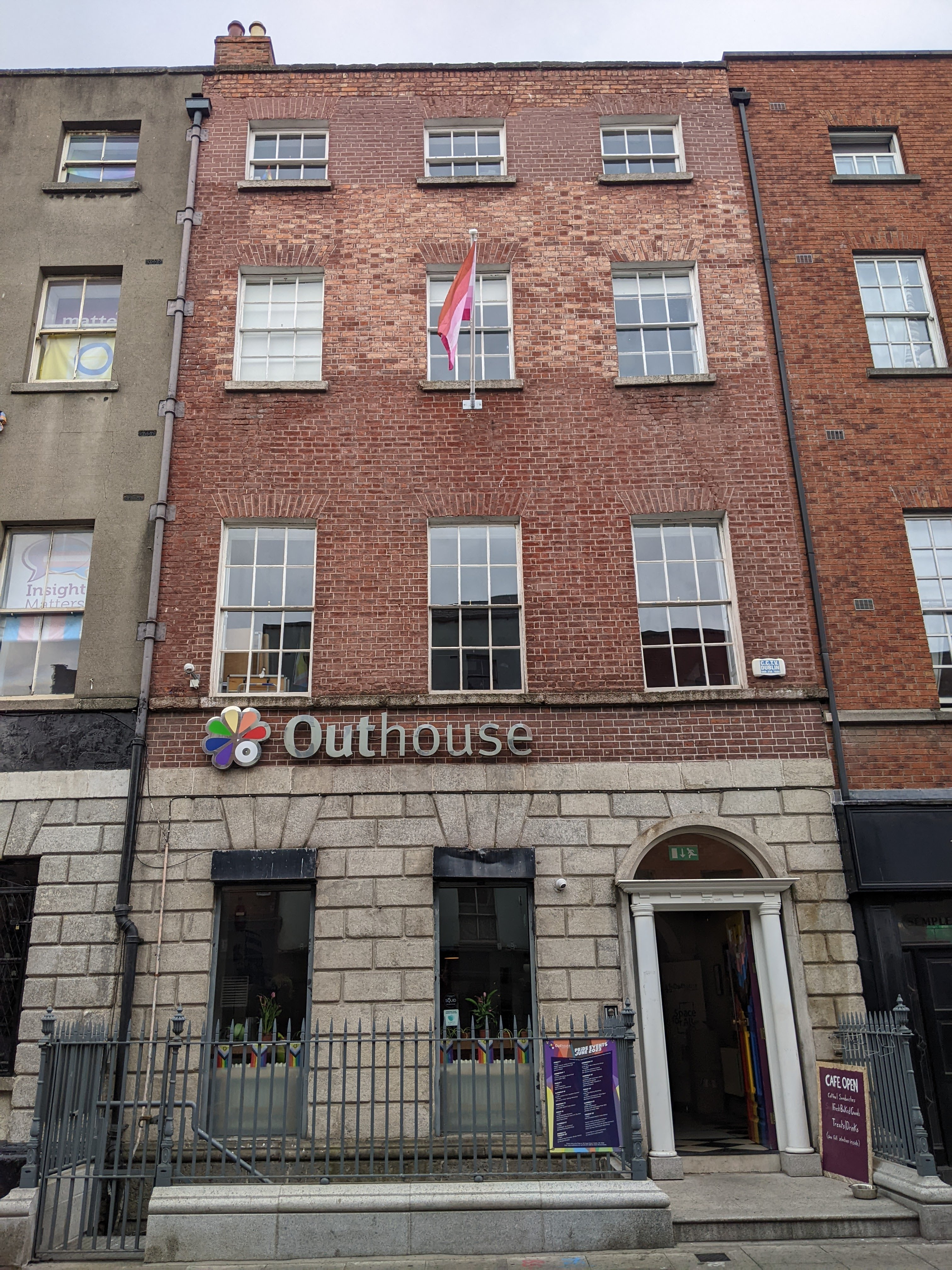
Outhouse, 105 Capel Street

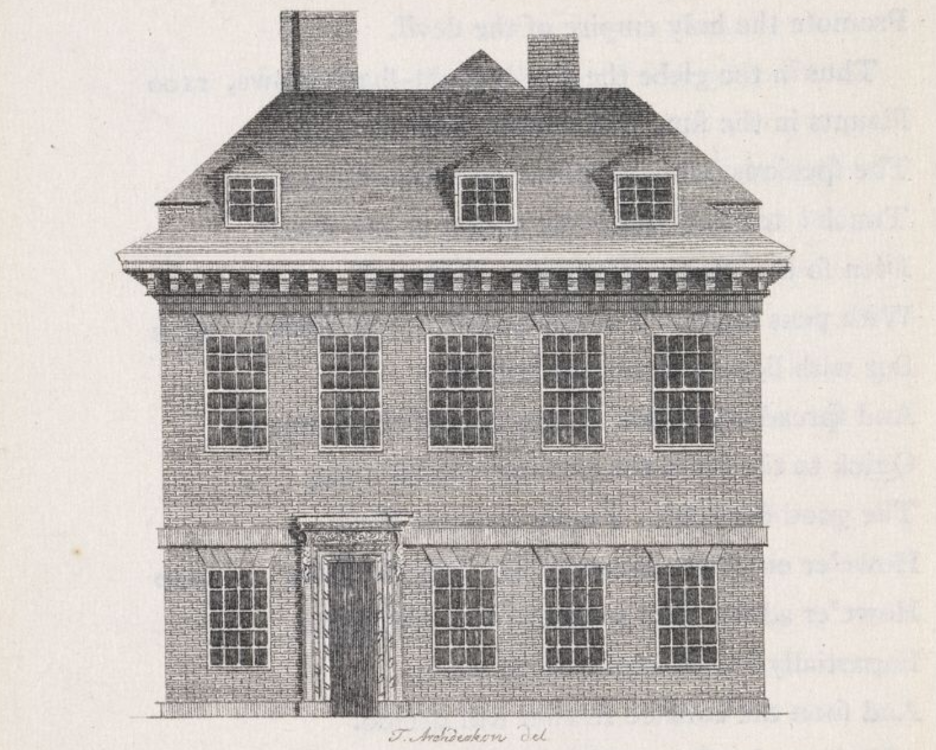
King James II's Mint House, 27 Capel Street

== See also ==
- List of streets and squares in Dublin
