= Jervis Street =

Street in central Dublin

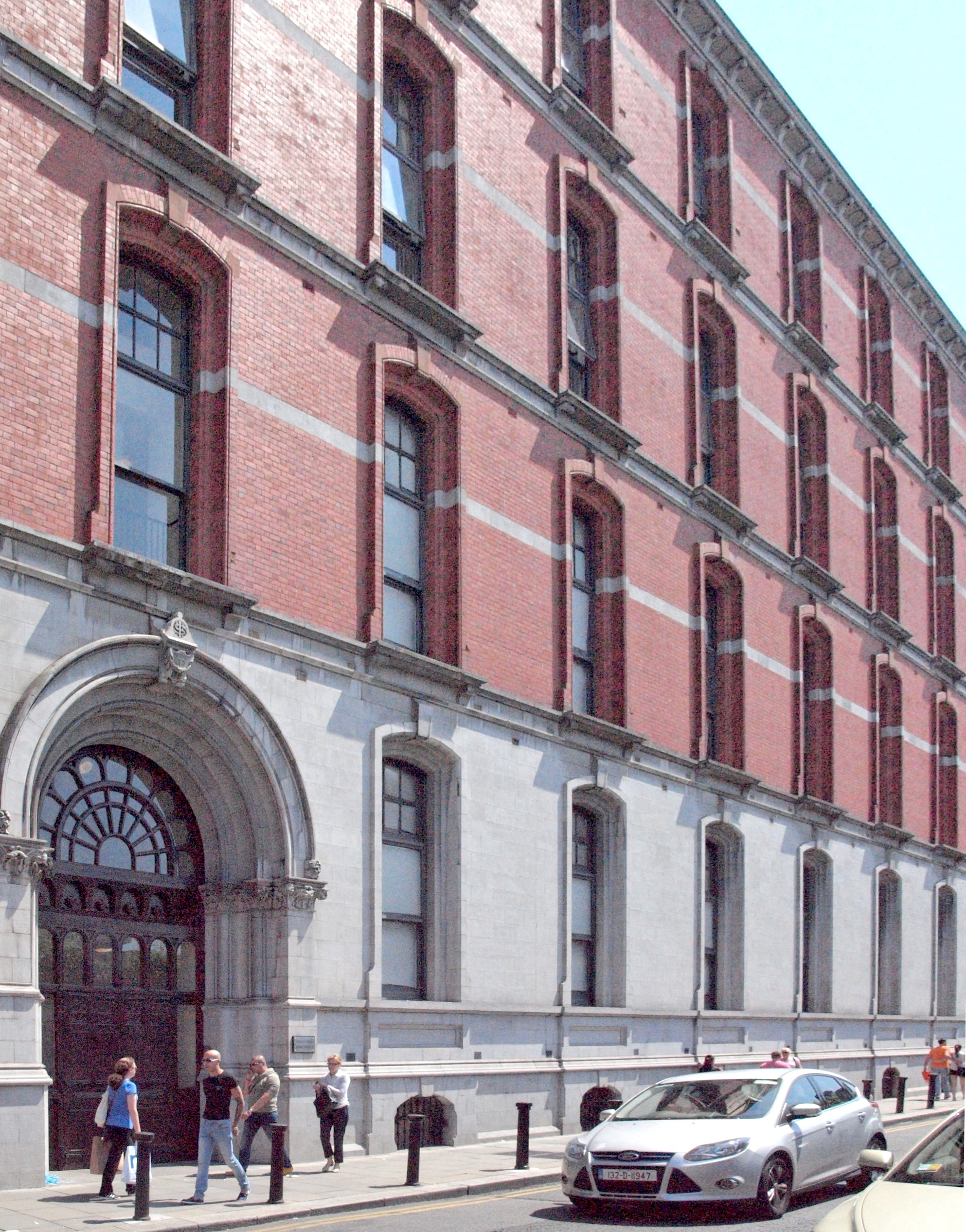

- Location within Central Dublin
- Native name: Sráid Jervis (Irish)
- Namesake: Humphrey Jervis
- Length: 400 m (1,300 ft)
- Width: 12 metres (39 ft)
- Location: Dublin, Ireland
- Postal code: D01
- Coordinates: 53.348524°N 6.266503°W
- north end: Parnell Street
- south end: Strand Street Great, Swift's Row

Construction
- Construction start: 1674

Other
- Known for: Jervis Shopping Centre, Wolfe Tone Square

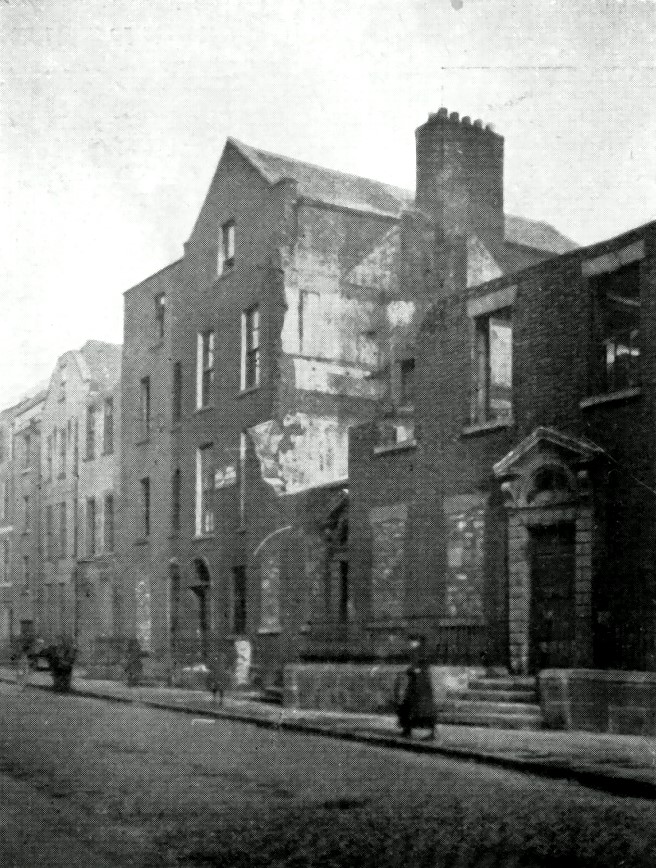
"Ruinous houses near corner of Jervis Street and Parnell Street", John Cooke, 1913.

Jervis Street /ˈdʒɜːrvɪs/ (Irish: Sráid Jervis) is a street on the northside of Dublin, Ireland laid out in the 17th century and named for Sir Humphrey Jervis.

It runs from Parnell Street in the north to Ormond Quay Lower in the south. It is crossed by Mary Street, Abbey Street Upper, and Strand Street Great.

== History ==
The street is part of the area developed by and named for Humphrey Jervis after 1674. Jervis purchased a portion of the St Mary's Abbey estate in 1674, on which he developed Jervis Street with it first appearing on Charles Brooking's map of Dublin (1728). He also developed Stafford Street, (now Wolfe Tone Street), Capel Street and Mary Street.

=== 18th century ===
Initially, the area around Jervis Street was a fashionable residential area. Towards the end of the 18th century, with the development of both the Fitzwilliam and Gardiner estates further out on the north-eastern and south-eastern sides of the city, the area began to become less fashionable.

A house in Jervis Street was for many years the home of the surgeon Samuel Croker-King, first president of the Royal College of Surgeons in Ireland, and his wife, the noted beauty Miss Obre.

=== 19th century ===
In the 19th century, the area around Henry Street, Mary Street and Capel Street remained a busy central and commercial retail area.

=== 20th century ===
At the beginning of the century from 1900–10, the Todd Burns department store was constructed on the corner of Mary Street and Jervis Street. As of 2024 this is the Irish headquarters of Penneys (Primark).

Over 900 people were listed as living in Jervis Street in the 1911 Irish Census.

In 1913, Jervis Street was one of the streets photographed by John Cooke, Honorary Treasurer of the National Society for the Prevention of Cruelty to Children (NSPCC), for presentation to the Dublin Housing Inquiry into the conditions of housing of the working classes of Dublin.

In the early 20th century, the original Georgian and pre-Georgian housing stock began to crumble and much was demolished over the first quarter of the century with most of the remainder demolished over the rest of the 20th century.

It was once the location of the Jervis Street Hospital which has since become the Jervis Shopping Centre which opened in 1996.

== See also ==
- Mary Street, Dublin
