= Wolf tone (disambiguation) =

A wolf tone is an unintended sound quality of an instrument in the violin family.

Wolf tone or Wolfe Tone may also refer to:

== Music ==
- Wolf interval, ratio of pitches appearing in some musical temperaments
- Wolf Tone, a British record label founded by Paul Epworth
- The Wolfe Tones, Irish band

== Sports ==
=== Ireland ===
- Wolfe Tones GAA, a GAA club in Oristown and Kilberry, County Meath
- Wolfe Tones GAA (Longford), a hurling-focused GAA club in Mostrim, County Longford
- Wolfe Tones GFC Drogheda, a Gaelic football club in Drogheda, County Louth
- Wolfe Tones na Sionna GAA, a GAA club in Shannon, County Clare

=== Northern Ireland ===
- Bellaghy Wolfe Tones GAC, or Bellaghy GAC, a GAA club in Bellaghy, County Londonderry
- Drumquin Wolfe Tones GAC, a GAA club in Drumquin, County Tyrone
- Greencastle Wolfe Tones GAC, a GAA club in Greencastle, County Antrim
- Kildress Wolfe Tones GAC, a GAA club in Kildress, County Tyrone
- Wolfe Tone GAC, Derrymacash, a GAA club in County Armagh

=== United States ===
- Chicago Wolfe Tones GFC, a Gaelic football club in Chicago, Illinois

== Other ==
- Wolfe Tone (1763–1798), Irish republican activist and namesake of many of the other entries on this page
- Wolfe Tone Societies, Irish republican group
- Wolfe Tone Square, a public space in Dublin, Ireland
- Wolfe Tone Weekly, a late-1930s Irish republican newspaper

== See also ==
- Wolfstone, a Scottish musical group
