= Wolfe Tones GAA (disambiguation) =

Wolfe Tones GAA are Gaelic Athletic Association-affiliated clubs named for Wolfe Tone.

== England ==
- Wolfe Tones GAA (Liverpool), based in Wavertree, Liverpool

== Ireland ==
- Wolfe Tones GAA (Meath), based in Oristown and Kilberry, County Meath
- Wolfe Tones GAA (Longford), based in Mostrim, County Longford
- Wolfe Tones GAA (Drogheda), based in Drogheda, County Louth
- Wolfe Tones GAA (Clare), based in Shannon, County Clare

== Northern Ireland ==
- Wolfe Tones GAA (Bellaghy), based in Bellaghy, County Londonderry
- Wolfe Tone GAA (Armagh), based in Derrymacash, County Armagh
- Wolfe Tones GAA (Drumquin), based in Drumquin, County Tyrone
- Wolfe Tones GAA (Greencastle) based in Greencastle, County Antrim
- Wolfe Tones GAA (Kildress), based in Kildress, County Tyrone

== United States ==
- Wolfe Tones GAA (Chicago), based in Chicago, Illinois
