= St Mary's Church, Mary Street, Dublin =

Former church in Ireland

St Mary's Church, Dublin
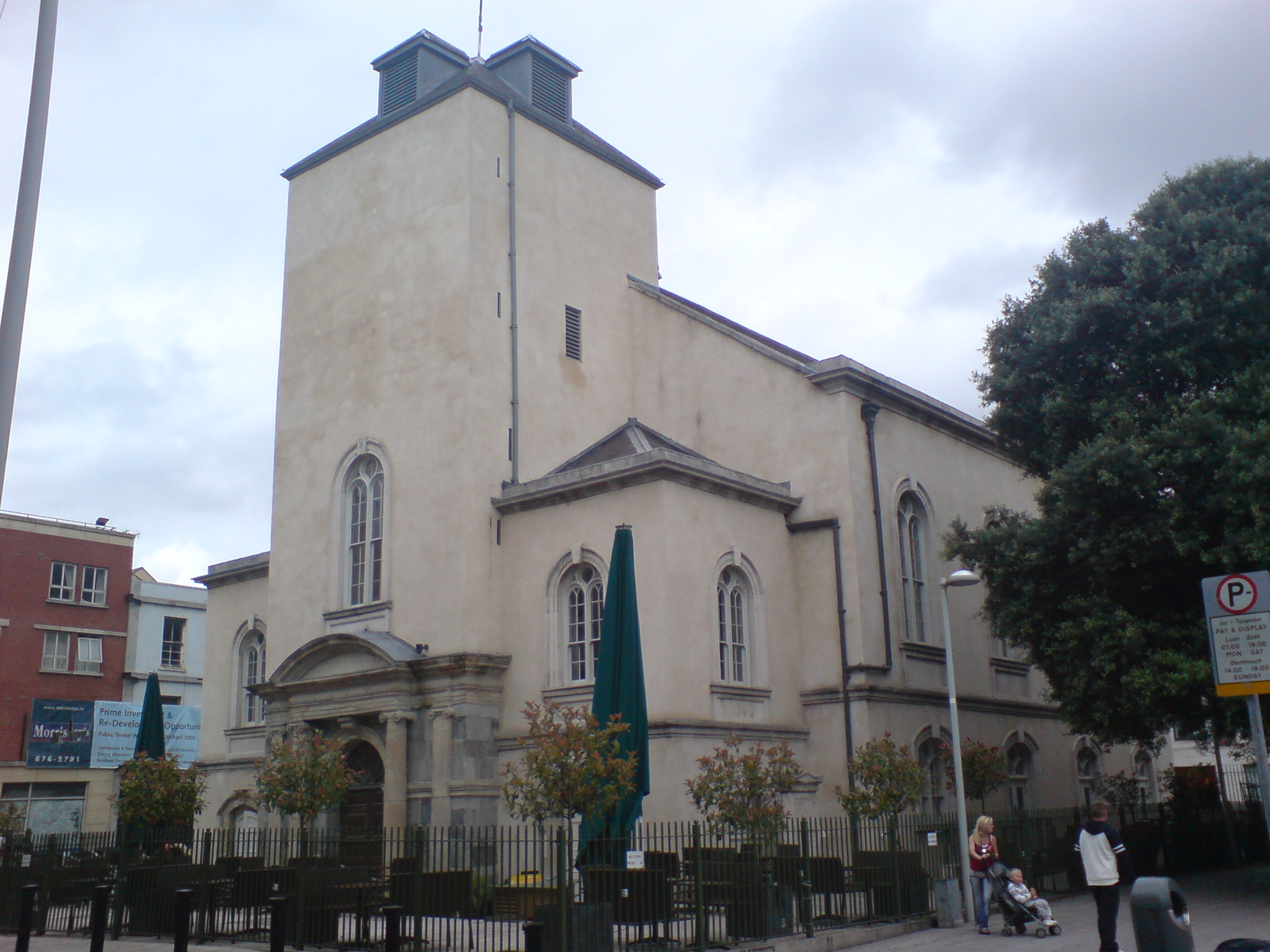
- St Mary's / The Church

- 53°20′55″N 6°16′1″W
- Location: Dublin
- Country: Ireland
- Previous denomination: Church of Ireland

Architecture
- Architect(s): William Robinson, Thomas Burgh
- Groundbreaking: 1698
- Completed: 1700 (foundation stone)
- Closed: 1986

St Mary's Church, Dublin is a former Church of Ireland building on the corner of Mary Street and Jervis Street, Dublin, adjacent to Wolfe Tone Square. From the 17th century, the church was a place of worship for parishioners on Dublin's northside, before it was closed in 1986. The church has since been deconsecrated and the building is now a pub and restaurant. The parish also had a chapel of ease - St Mary's - off Dorset Street, more commonly known as "The Black Church".

== History ==
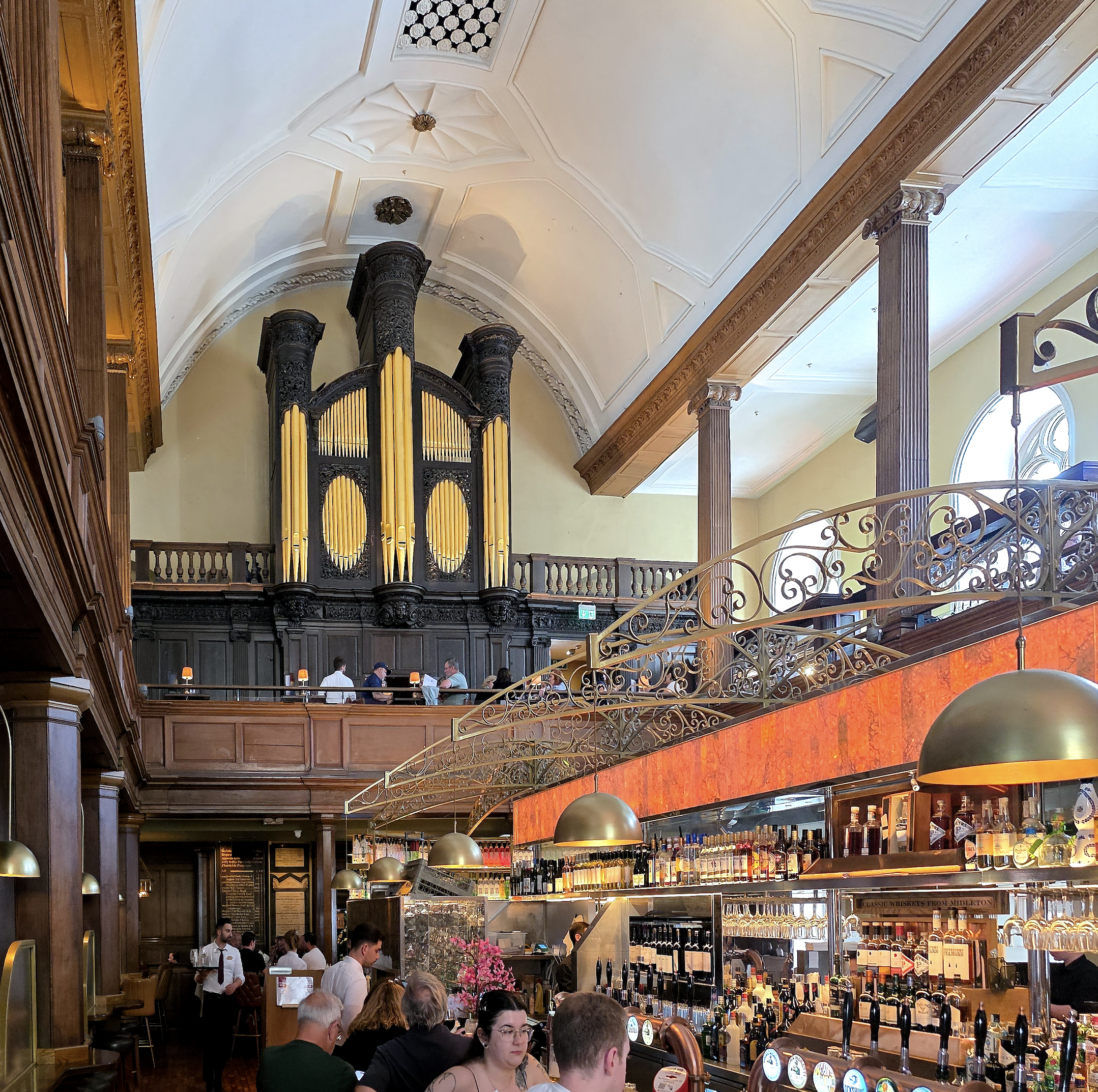
The church nave, now converted into a bar

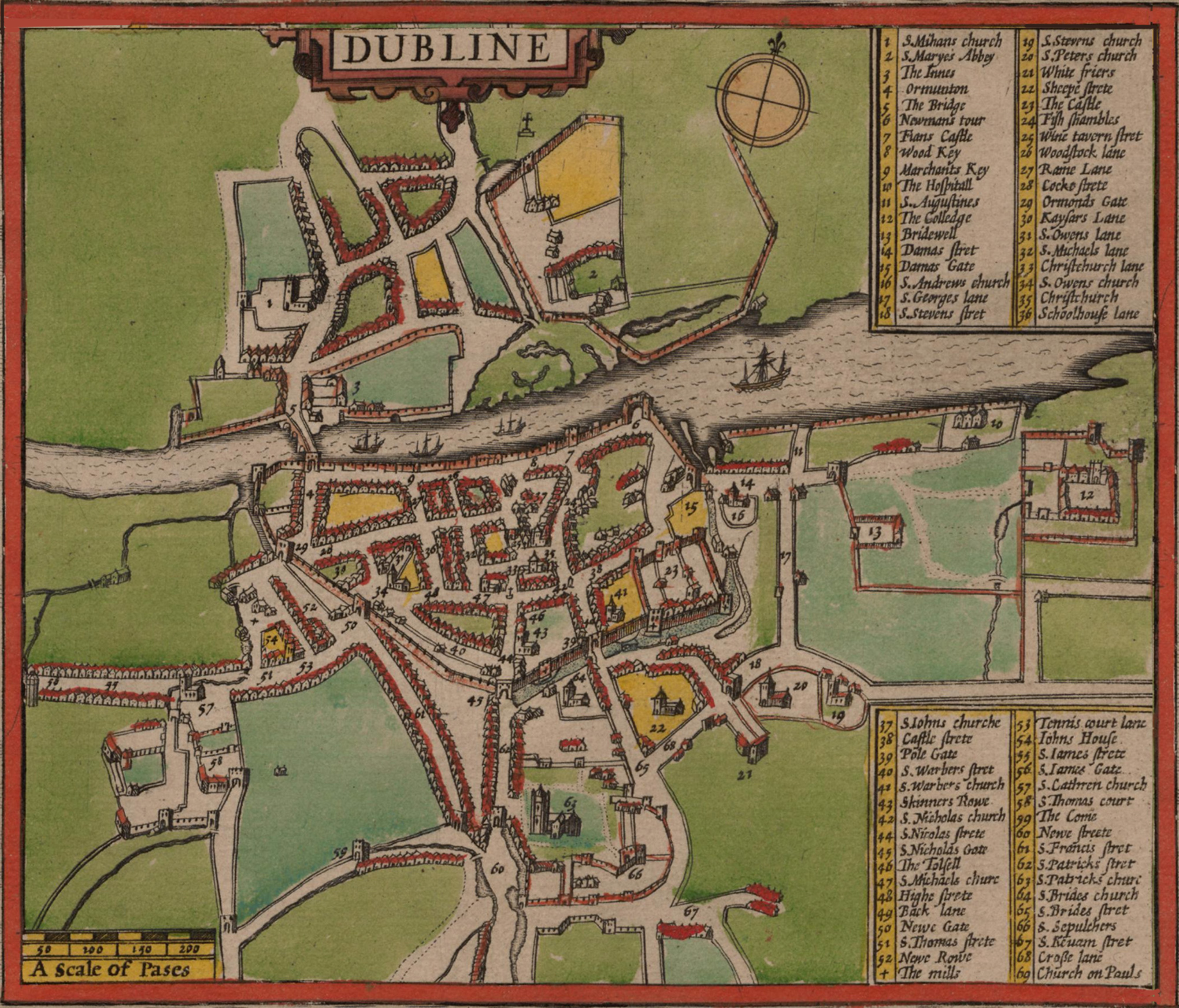
1610 map of Dublin by John Speed noting the location of St. Mary's Abbey close to the location of the current building

From the early middle-ages, the northside of Dublin was served by the parish of St. Michan's and the abbey of St. Mary. After the dissolution of the monasteries, the abbey was all but closed, and in the late 17th century, the parish of St. Mary's was formed. As recorded by the original register book of the "Parish of St. Maries" (St. Mary's), the parish "was separated from the Parish of St. Michans, & made a district Parish by Act of Parliament" on 20 November 1697.

The current building was designed in 1697, by Sir William Robinson, and the foundation stone was laid in 1700. Some of the church construction was overseen by Thomas Burgh, and the church is notable as the first in Dublin to have been built with galleries. It was consecrated in 1701. The organ of the church was built by Renatus Harris.

The church was one of the first large buildings in the area to be constructed on the newly laid out Mary Street, and was under construction at the same time as nearby Langford House.

The parish register records that the first rector was Peter Broun (or Browne), later provost of Trinity College, and that the first churchwardens were Robert Rochfort, the attorney general, and Allen Brodrick, solicitor general. Other rectors have included John Francis (1705–23) and Dixie Blundell.

=== Closure ===
The church closed in 1986 and after deconsecration, became a retail outlet. It was later converted to use as a pub and restaurant. Originally named the "John M. Keating Bar", the pub changed hands in 2007 and is now simply called "The Church".

Its churchyard was converted into Wolfe Tone Square, a public park where the gravestones can be seen stacked up at the southern end.

== Notable parishioners and burials ==
Arthur Guinness was married in St Mary's in 1761. Notable baptisms in the church include Seán O'Casey in 1880 and Theobald Wolfe Tone in 1763. (Wolfe Tone was born at 44 Stafford Street nearby; Stafford Street was later renamed Wolfe Tone Street after him.) The Earl of Charlemont was baptized in the church in 1728, and Richard Brinsley Sheridan in 1751.

The adjoining churchyard is the final resting place of the United Irishman Archibald Hamilton Rowan (1751–1834), Mary Mercer, founder of Mercer's Hospital (died 1734), the philosopher Francis Hutcheson (1694–1746), Sir Boyle Roche, 1st Baronet (1736–1807), the Anglo-Irish politician Henry Maxwell, parish rector William Fletcher (1715–1771), and Lord Norbury (1745–1831; known colloquially as the hanging judge). Walter Shirley, a priest and controversialist was buried here as well.
