= Matilda Tone =

Wife of Wolfe Tone

- Born: Martha Witherington; 17 June 1769; Dublin, Ireland
- Died: 18 March 1849 (aged 79); Georgetown, District of Columbia
- Resting place: Green-Wood Cemetery, Brooklyn, New York
- Spouse: Wolfe Tone

Matilda Tone (17 June 1769 – 18 March 1849) was the wife of the executed Irish republican leader Theobald Wolfe Tone and, from exile in the United States, was instrumental in the preservation and publication of his papers.

== Early life ==
Matilda Tone was born Martha Witherington in Dublin on 17 June 1769. She was the eldest daughter of merchant William Witherington and his wife Catherine (née Fanning). Her father is listed as a woollen draper on Grafton Street, Dublin from 1768 to 1784, as a wine merchant from 1784 to 1788, and finally as a merchant from 1788 to 1793. It is claimed that Witherington was a lieutenant in the Royal Navy and sat on the merchants’ guild on Dublin's common council from 1777 to 1783. Her mother was a housekeeper to her father after he was widowed. Tone received a good education, and maintained an interest in drama and literature throughout her life. Katherine Wilmot visited Tone in Paris in 1802 and commented on the books she had in French, Italian and English authors. When she was 15 years old, she got to know Wolfe Tone through her older brother. He was still a student in Trinity College Dublin, and it was he that renamed her Matilda. They married when she was just 16, on 21 July 1785 in St Ann's Church, Dublin, honeymooning in Maynooth. Upon their return they lived with the Witheringtons, though they were not on good terms, and then with Tone's parents in Bodenstown, County Kildare.

== Family life ==
The Tone's first child, Maria, was born before October 1786. She was followed by a son, Richard, who was named for their neighbour Richard Griffith, who died in infancy. Tone stayed with her husband's family while he was studying for the bar in London from 1787 to 1788. When he returned, the couple had two more sons: William Theobald Wolfe Tone born 29 April 1791, and Francis Rawdon Tone, born 23 June 1793. Francis was known as Frank and was named after Francis Rawdon-Hastings. William was born in Dublin, and Frank was probably born in Bodenstown. By this time that family had a cottage in Bodenstown which Wolfe Tone had inherited from his uncle Jonathan Tone that the family jokingly referred to as Château Boue. They lived there until May 1795, when they left for Princeton, New Jersey due to political reasons.

Matilda Tone and the children came back to Europe to join Tone in France 18 months later. The family settled in Paris, at first living with Colonel Henry Shee at Nanterre, later moving to the suburb, Chaillot. Tone educated her children at home. Very few of her letters survive, but many of her husband's letters and diaries were addressed or intended for her. From these and her letter to her friend Eliza Fletcher, it is clear she shared her husband's interest in politics. Following her husband's death in November 1798, she moved to a small apartment at 51 rue St Jacques in the Latin quarter of Paris. This was to be close to her son William, who was attending Lycée Louis-le-Grand. She was awarded a pension of 1,200 francs for herself and 400 for each of her children after the rupture of the peace of Amiens on 18 May 1803.

Her daughter Maria died in April 1803, and then her son Frank died in 1807, both of tuberculosis. William was displaying symptoms of the disease as well, which prompted her to move to America in 1807. From there, they attempted to sort out her husband's affairs, which had been entrusted to James Reynolds. They retrieved only a few of Tone's pre-1795 diaries, and all of the post-1795 letters and diaries, which they added to the autobiography she already had in her possession. When William entered the Cavalry School at Saint-Germain-en-Laye in November 1810 as a cadet, Tone moved to be close to him, living at the Hôtel de la Surintendance. By approaching Napoleon in 1811, who knew Wolfe Tone, she ensured that her son received French citizenship and the privileged status of "élève du gouvernement." In January 1813, when William began his service, Tone returned to Paris to live on the rue de Lille, and later moved to the Latin quarter.

After the defeat of Napoleon in June 1815, William was refused entry to Ireland or to visit Britain. This led to both mother and son returning to America. Before she left Paris, Tone married her old friend Thomas Wilson on 19 August 1816. Wilson was a Scottish businessman and advocate who had taken care of Tone's financial affairs after the death of her husband. The couple visited Scotland, and then moved to New York in 1817, and finally to Georgetown, District of Columbia around 1820. She lived there until her death, and called herself Matilda Tone-Wilson.

== Later life and publications ==
Starting in 1824, The New Monthly Magazine began the unauthorised publication of extracts from Wolfe Tone's autobiography. In response, Tone decided to publish all of Wolfe Tone's papers and writing, including the autobiography, pamphlets and diaries, edited by their son William. What resulted was two large volumes entitled the Life of Theobald Wolfe Tone, published in May 1826. Tone added a memoir of her own life in Paris following his death in 1798. The book was a best-seller, and ensured the legacy of Wolfe Tone, as well as being an important contemporary document of both Irish and French revolutionary politics.

William Tone died in 1828, after which Tone lived more privately. She died in Georgetown on 18 March 1849. Thomas Wilson predeceased her in 1824. Just two weeks previously she had been interviewed by a Young Irelander, Charles Hart. She was initially buried near William Tone at Marbury burying-ground, Georgetown. After that cemetery was sold, she was reinterred in Green-Wood Cemetery, Brooklyn, New York on 31 October 1891 by her great-grandchildren. A new monument was dedicated to her, which was later restored in 1996.
