= Thomas Davis (Young Irelander) =

Irish writer and activist

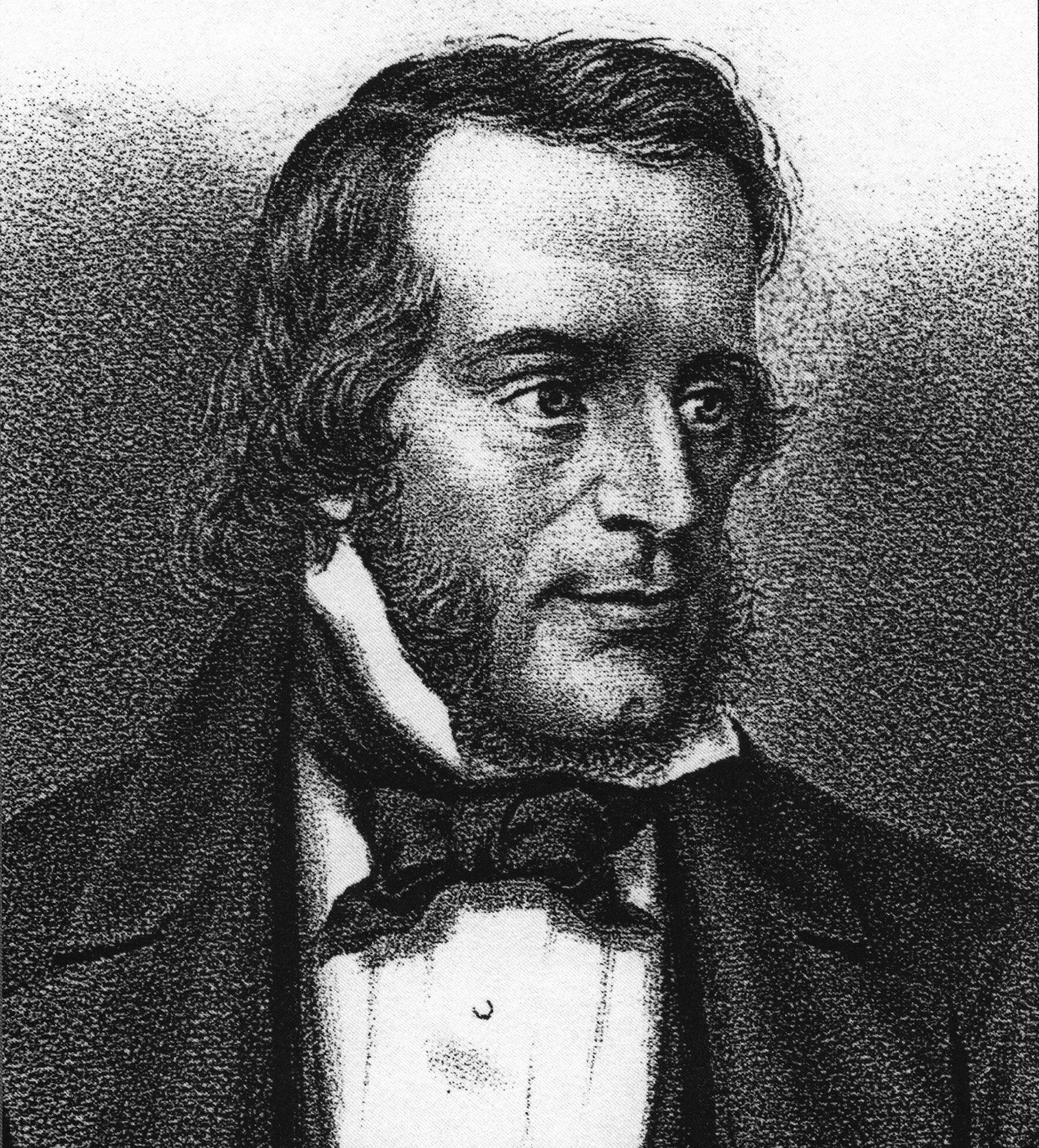
- Davis in the 1840s
- Born: 14 October 1814; Mallow, Ireland
- Died: 16 September 1845 (aged 30); Dublin, Ireland
- Education: Arts degree
- Alma mater: Trinity College, Dublin
- Occupation: Writer
- Writing career
- Period: 1842–1845
- Notable works: "The West's Asleep" "A Nation Once Again"
- Movement: Young Ireland

Thomas Osborne Davis (14 October 1814 – 16 September 1845) was an Irish writer; with Charles Gavan Duffy and John Blake Dillon, a founding editor of The Nation, the weekly organ of what came to be known as the Young Ireland movement. While embracing the common cause of a representative, national government for Ireland, Davis took issue with the nationalist leader Daniel O'Connell by arguing for the common ("mixed") education of Catholics and Protestants and by advocating for Irish as the national language.

== Early life ==
Thomas Davis was born on 14 October 1814, in Mallow, County Cork, fourth and last child of James Davis, a Welsh surgeon in the Royal Artillery based for many years in Dublin, and an Irish mother. His father died in Exeter a month before his birth, en route to serve in the Peninsular War. His mother was Protestant, but also related to the Chiefs of Clan O'Sullivan of Beare, members of the Gaelic nobility of Ireland.

His mother had enough money to live on her own and moved back to Dublin in 1818, taking up residence at 67 Lower Baggot Street in 1830, where Davis lived until his death in 1845. He attended school in Lower Mount Street, then went to Trinity College, Dublin. He became auditor of the College Historical Society, and graduated in 1835 with a degree in Logic. From 1836 to 1838, he studied law in London and Europe; although he qualified as a lawyer in 1838, he never practised.

== Cultural nationalist ==
Davis has been seen as an early exponent in Ireland of what has since been understood as cultural nationalism. In contrast to the Painite republicanism of the 1790s, and to the mix of Benthamite utilitarianism and Catholic devotionalism that characterised O'Connell's leadership of the national movement, Davis promoted the Irish language as a means of reconnecting with the Gaelic past.

Davis drew inspiration from the civic and enlightenment ideas promoted by the United Irishmen prior to the 1798 Rebellion. One of Davis's first major projects was a collection of the bar, and parliamentary speeches, with a "Memoir and Historical Notices", of John Philpot Curran. Karl Marx was to recommend it to Friedrich Engels on the basis of being able to find there "quoted there all the sources for the United Irishmen".

Davis was also the source of a hagiography of The United Irishmen, centred on the figure of Wolfe Tone. In 1843, he published his elegiac poem Tone's Grave, and with the blessing Tone's widow Mathilda (in American exile), organised the first Bodenstown Tone memorial. With for his fellow Young Irelander (and Protestant) John Mitchel, Tone for Davis was an "alternative national hero" to O'Connell, "the Liberator", with whose solicitation of Whig government favour and Catholic clericalism he was increasingly at odds.

It was a turn toward a romantic nationalism, in which Davis was influenced by the ideas of Johann Gottfried von Herder (1744–1803). For Herder nationality was not genetic but the product of climate, geography, history and inclination. Davis did write of an "unsaxonised" Ireland, but this was not an Ireland ethnically cleansed of those of his own British ancestry and reformed religion. Rather it was an Ireland in which Catholic and Protestant alike, find sufficient unity and strength in their education and in their "recollections, ancestral, personal, national" to resist England's "unnatural", "cosmopolite" influence.

Davis decried the new liberal political economy, more closely associated in England with O'Connell's friends among the Whigs, than by the more tradition-bound Tories. Ireland would never attain nationhood so long as it remained in thrall to what he described as "modern Anglicanism: i.e. Utilitarianism . . ., Yankeeism, Englishism, which measures prosperity by exchangeable value, measures duty by gain, and limits desire to clothes and respectability". As a barrier to this anglicisation, Davis looked not to the majority Catholic Church, but to Irish, which by the 1840s was fast becoming a minority language.

In September 1842, with Charles Gavan Duffy and John Blake Dillon, Davis began publication in Dublin of The Nation. While designed to support O'Connell's campaign for repeal of the 1801 Union, Davis made the weekly a vehicle for promoting Irish, a language "inseparably mingled", in his view, with the history and "soul" of the Irish people. While a Gaeilgeoir himself, for O'Connell this meant little. He declared "the superior utility of the English tongue, as the medium of all modern communication" too great a consideration for him to regret "the gradual abandonment" of Irish.

== Differences with Daniel O'Connell ==
Davis supported O'Connell's Repeal Association from 1840, hoping to restore, on a reformed basis, an Irish Parliament in Dublin. There were tensions, but an open split with O'Connell first developed in 1845 on the question of non-denominational education, when the vehemence of O'Connell's opposition reduced Davis to tears. In advance of some of the Catholic bishops, O'Connell had denounced as "godless" the three new Queens Colleges in which Dublin Castle proposed to educate Catholics and Protestants together in a non-denominational basis.

When, in The Nation, Davis pleaded that "reasons for separate education are reasons for [a] separate life". O'Connell accused Davis of suggesting it a "crime to be a Catholic" and declared himself content to take a stand "for Old Ireland". Davis, Duffy and others in the circle around The Nation he now referred to as Young Irelanders—for O'Connell an unflattering reference to Giuseppe Mazzini's anti-clerical and insurrectionist Young Italy.

A further rift with O'Connell opened over the question of a path to a possible compromise between Union and Repeal. While insisting he would "never ask for or work" for anything less than an independent legislature, O'Connell had suggested he might accept a "subordinate parliament" (an Irish legislature with powers devolved from Westminster) as "an instalment". Unlike some of his colleagues at The Nation, Davis did not reject this in principle. But while O'Connell looked for compromise at Westminster, Davis sought agreement with the "federalist" William Sharman Crawford, a representative of Protestant Ulster upon which O'Connell appeared to turn his back.

== Death ==
Despite their differences, O'Connell was distraught at Davis's early and sudden death. Davis died from scarlet fever in 1845 at the age of 30. He was buried in Mount Jerome Cemetery, Dublin.

== Legacy ==
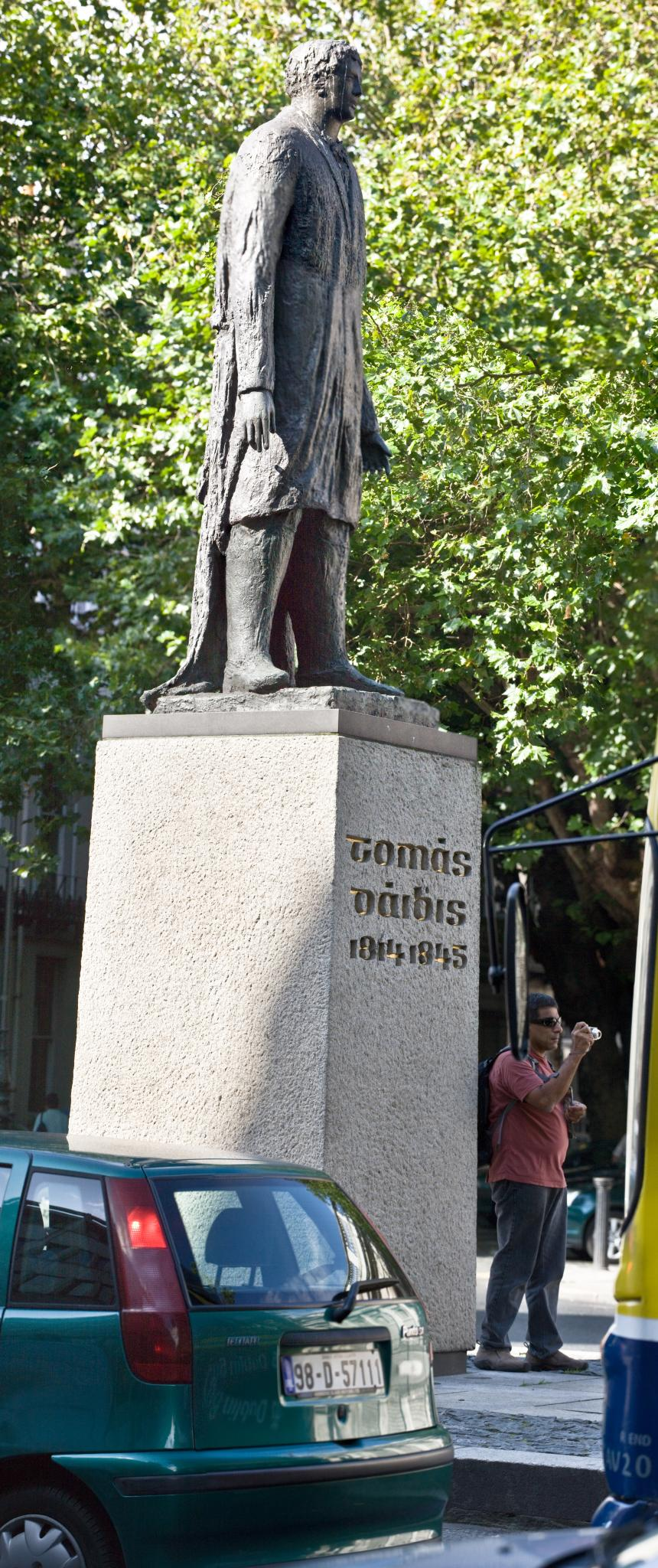
Thomas Davis, College Green, facing Trinity College, Dublin

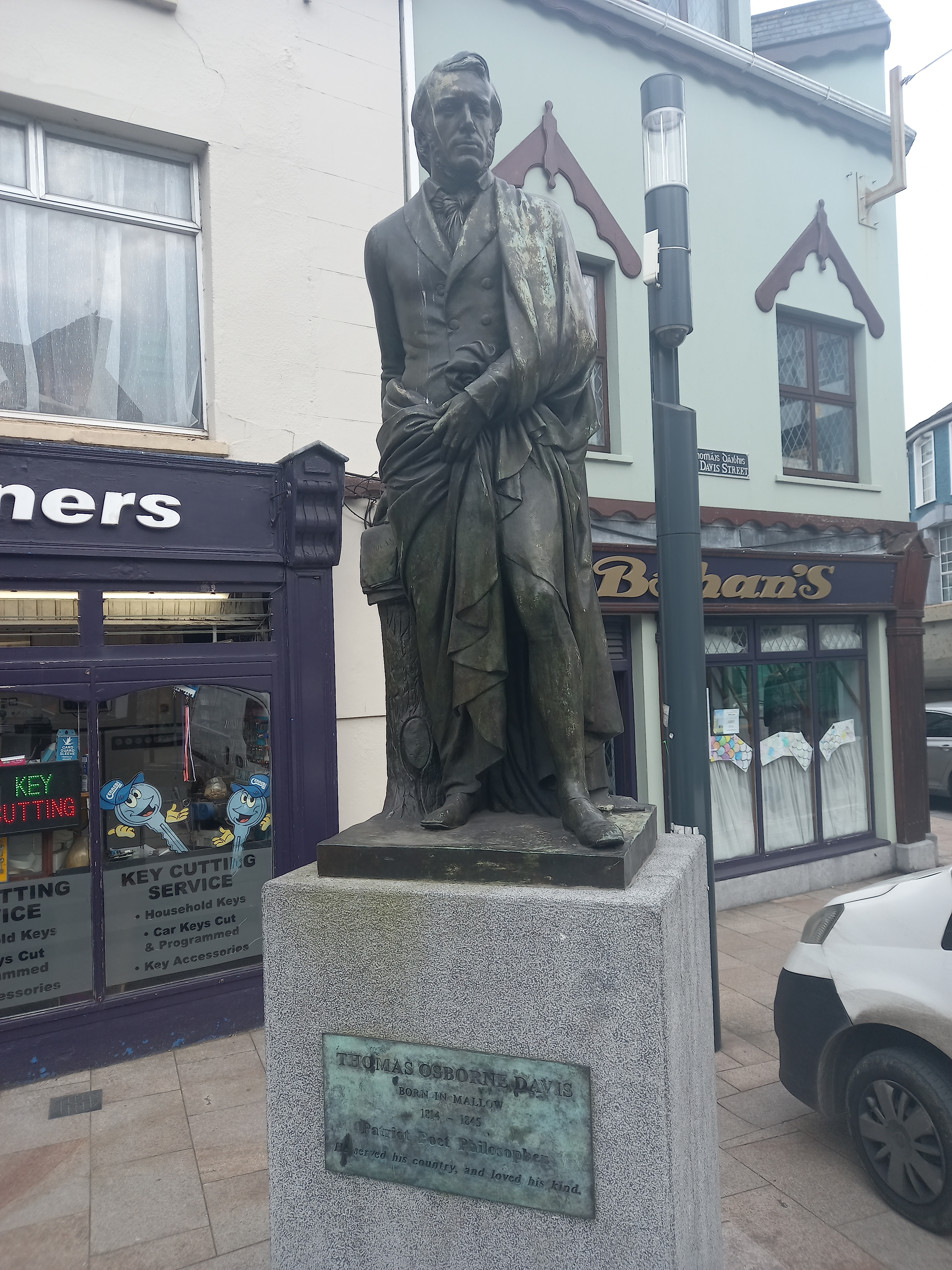
Statue in Mallow

Davis composed a number of songs, including Irish rebel songs, such as "The West's Asleep", "A Nation Once Again", "In Bodenstown Churchyard", and the "Lament for Owen Roe O'Neill". He wrote that "a song is worth a thousand harangues". Music, he suggested, "is the first faculty of the Irish... we will endeavour to teach the people to sing the songs of their country that they may keep alive in their minds the love of the fatherland."

As well as many contributions to periodicals and newspapers, he wrote a memoir of John Philpot Curran, the Irish lawyer and orator, prefixed to an edition of his speeches, and a history of the 1689 Patriot Parliament; other literary plans were left unfinished by his early death.

A statue of Davis, created by Edward Delaney, was unveiled on College Green, Dublin, in 1966, attended by the Irish president, Éamon de Valera.

The main street of his home town of Mallow is named Davis Street, which contains a bronze statue of Davis designed by sculptor Leo Higgins. One of the secondary schools in Mallow, Davis College, is named after him.

A number of Gaelic Athletic Association clubs around the country are also named after him, including one in Tallaght, Dublin and one in Corrinshego, County Armagh.

Fort Davis, at the entrance to Cork Harbour, is named after him.

Thomas Davis Street, off Francis Street in Dublin 8, is also named after him.

== Works ==
- The Patriot Parliament of 1689: first edition (1843); third edition, with an introduction by Charles Gavan Duffy (1893)
- The Speeches of the Right Honorable John Philpot Curran, edited with Memoir and Historical Notices (1845)
- Letters of a Protestant, on Repeal [Five letters originally published in The Nation.] Edited by Thomas F. Meagher (1847)
- Literary and Historical Essays (edited by Charles Gavan Duffy) (1846)
- The Poems of Thomas Davis (with notes and historical illustrations edited by Thomas Wallis) (1846)

== Sources ==
- Cullen, Fintan (1854). Sources in Irish Art: A Reader. Cork University Press.
- Hachey, Thomas E (2010). The Irish Experience Since 1800: A Concise History. M.E. Sharpe. ISBN 978-0765628435.
- King, Brian (2016). "Herder & Human Identity". Philosophy Now (112).
- Moody, TW (1966). "Thomas Davis and the Irish Nation". Hermathena. 103 (103): 5–31. JSTOR 23039825.
- Mulvey, Helen (2003). Thomas Davis and Ireland: A Biographical Sketch. Catholic University of America Press. ISBN 978-0813213033.
- Penet, Jean-Christophe (2007). "Thomas Davis, 'The Nation' and the Irish Language". An Irish Quarterly Review. 96 (284): 433–443. JSTOR 25660516.
- Potter, Tony, ed. (2017), The Pocket Book of Great Irish Speeches, Gill Books, ISBN 978-0717172917
- various (1892), The Book of Trinity College, Dublin, 1591-1891, Marcus Ward & Co. – via Project Gutenberg
