= Wolfe Tone Square =

Public space in Dublin, Ireland

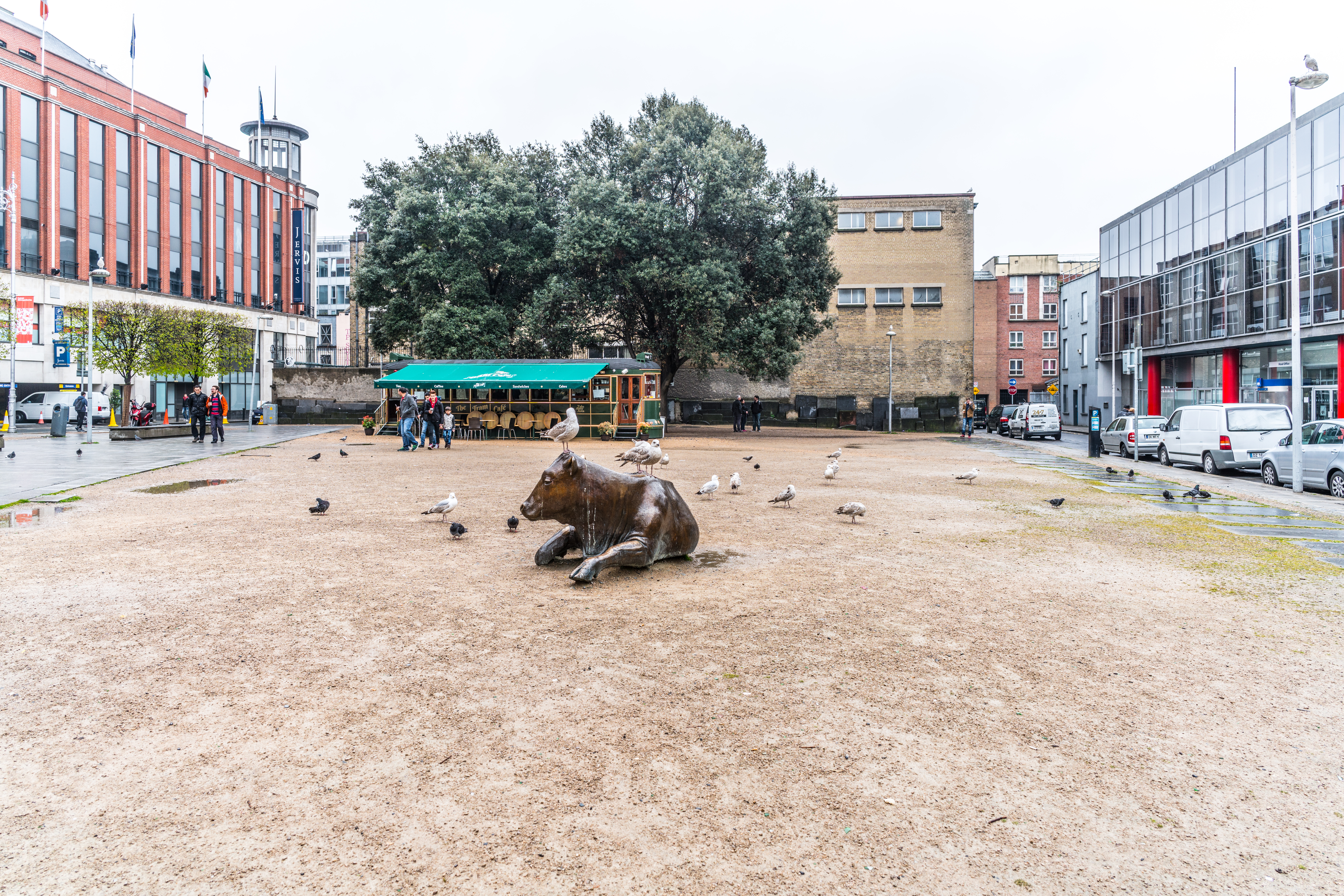
- Wolfe Tone park in 2016, with Jackie McKenna's "Ag Crú na Gréine" sculpture

- Location within Central Dublin
- Native name: Cearnóg Wolfe Tone (Irish)
- Namesake: Theobald Wolfe Tone
- Area: 0.4 hectares (0.99 acres)
- Location: Dublin, Ireland
- Postal code: D01
- Coordinates: 53.3481°N 6.2667°W

Wolfe Tone Park (Irish: Páirc Wolfe Tone), also known as Wolfe Tone Square, is a public space in Dublin, Ireland. It is bounded by Mary Street to the north, Jervis Street to the east, and Wolfe Tone Street to the west.

The park is the site of a graveyard that was attached to St. Mary's Church, and is named for Theobald Wolfe Tone (1763–1798), who was baptised in the church. The graveyard was deconsecrated in 1966 and laid out as a green park. From 1998 to 2001, Dublin City Council redeveloped the park as an "urban plaza". The park was closed for further regeneration works in late 2020, and reopened in mid-2022.

== Churchyard ==
The site, formerly the graveyard of St Mary's Church, was the burial place of the United Irishman Archibald Hamilton Rowan (1751–1834), Mary Mercer, founder of Mercer's Hospital (died 1734), the philosopher Francis Hutcheson (1694–1746), Sir Boyle Roche, 1st Baronet (1736–1807), an Irish politician and member of the Irish House of Commons, and Lord Norbury (1745–1831; known colloquially as the hanging judge). The church and its graveyard were deconsecrated in 1966, and the gravestones were moved or removed.

== Redevelopment ==
From the 1960s to the 1990s, the site operated as a greenspace, maintained by Dublin City Council. In 1998, the council held a competition to redesign the park, which was won by Peter Cody of Boyd Cody Architects. The updated layout, in the form of an "urban plaza", was completed in 2001. After the square's layout was changed, it was made available by Dublin City Council for events, including the Dublin Fringe Festival.

Following a campaign from local residents to restore "Wolfe Tone Park as a non-commercial green space", there was debate in the council as to the future use of the park as of 2015. Ultimately the park was closed between 2020 and 2022, and Dublin City Council redeveloped and "restore[d] it to a green space".
