= Tone's Grave =

Song by Thomas Davis (1814–1845)

Tone's Grave, often referred to as Bodenstown churchyard, was written by Thomas Davis (1814–1845), the Young Ireland leader, and published first in their newspaper The Nation. It was written following his visit to the grave of Theobald Wolfe Tone in Bodenstown, County Kildare, in 1843 when he found Tone's grave unmarked but guarded by a local blacksmith who would allow nobody to set foot on it.

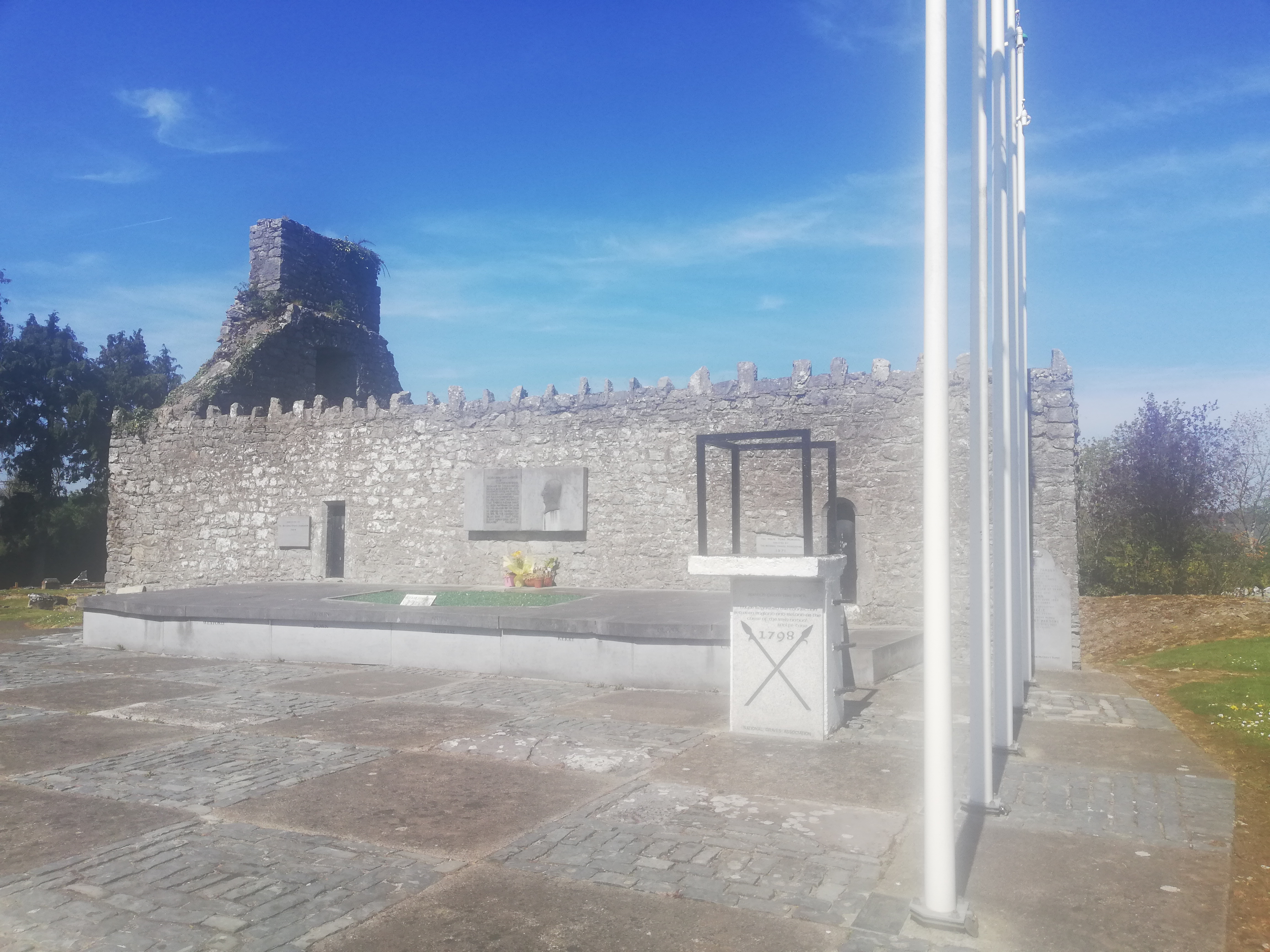
Tone's modern gravesite, built in part due to the poem.

The song mourns the failure of the United Irishmen and the loss of leaders like Wolfe Tone but hints at the impending awakening of Irish nationalism much hoped for by the Young Ireland movement.

== Lyrics ==
In Bodenstown churchyard there is a green grave,
And wildly around it the winter winds rave;
Small shelter I ween are the ruined walls there
When the storm sweeps down on the plains of Kildare.

Once I lay on that sod it lies over Wolfe Tone
And thought how he perished in prison alone,
His friends unavenged and his country unfreed
"Oh, bitter," I cried, "is the patriots meed.

"For in him the heart of a woman combined
With heroic spirit and a governing mind
A martyr for Ireland, his grave has no stone
His name seldom named, and his virtues unknown."

I was woke from my dream by the voices and tread
Of a band who came into the home of the dead;
They carried no corpse, and they carried no stone,
And they stopped when they came to the grave of Wolfe Tone.

There were students and peasants, the wise and the brave,
And an old man who knew him from cradle to grave,
And children who thought me hard-hearted, for they
On that sanctified sod were forbidden to play.

But the old man, who saw I was mourning there, said:
"We come, sir, to weep where young Wolfe Tone is laid,
And we're going to raise him a monument, too
A plain one, yet fit for the simple and true."

My heart overflowed, and I clasped his old hand,
And I blessed him, and blessed every one of his band:
"Sweet, sweet 'tis to find that such faith can remain
To the cause and the man so long vanquished and slain."

In Bodenstown churchyard there is a green grave,
And freely around it let winter winds rave
Far better they suit him the ruin and gloom
Till Ireland, a nation, can build him a tomb.
