= Wolfe Tone Street, Dublin =

Street in Dublin, Ireland

Wolfe Tone Street
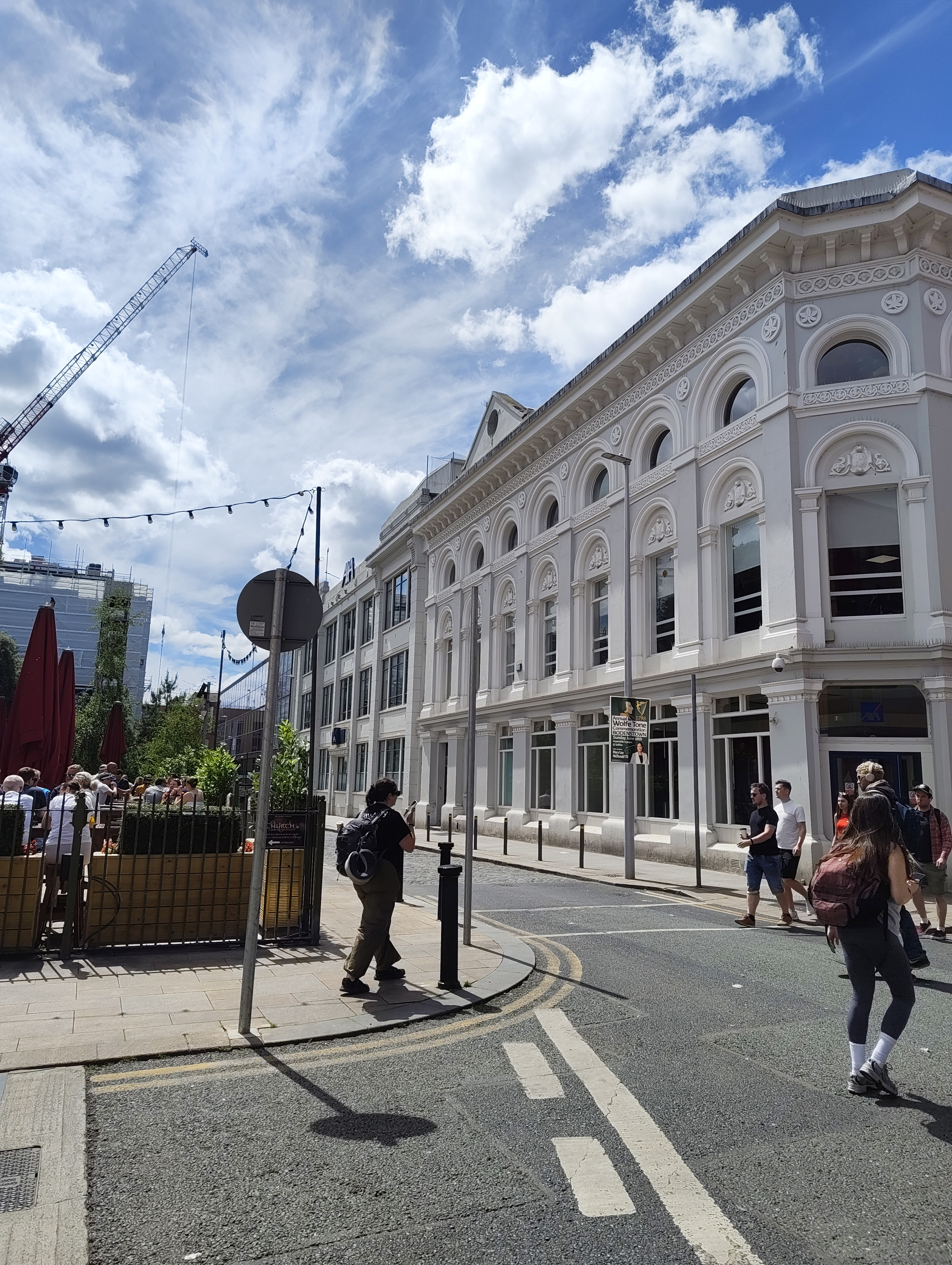
- Wolfe Tone Street looking south to Abbey Street
- Interactive map of Wolfe Tone Street
- Native name: Sráid Wolfe Tone (Irish)
- Former name: Stafford Street
- Namesake: Theobald Wolfe Tone
- Postal code: D01
- Coordinates: 53.3475°N 6.26692°W
- north end: Parnell Street
- Major junctions: Mary Street
- South end: Abbey Street

Wolfe Tone Street (Irish: Sráid Wolfe Tone) is a street on the northside of Dublin, Ireland. The street runs from Parnell Street at the north to Abbey Street in the south.

== History ==
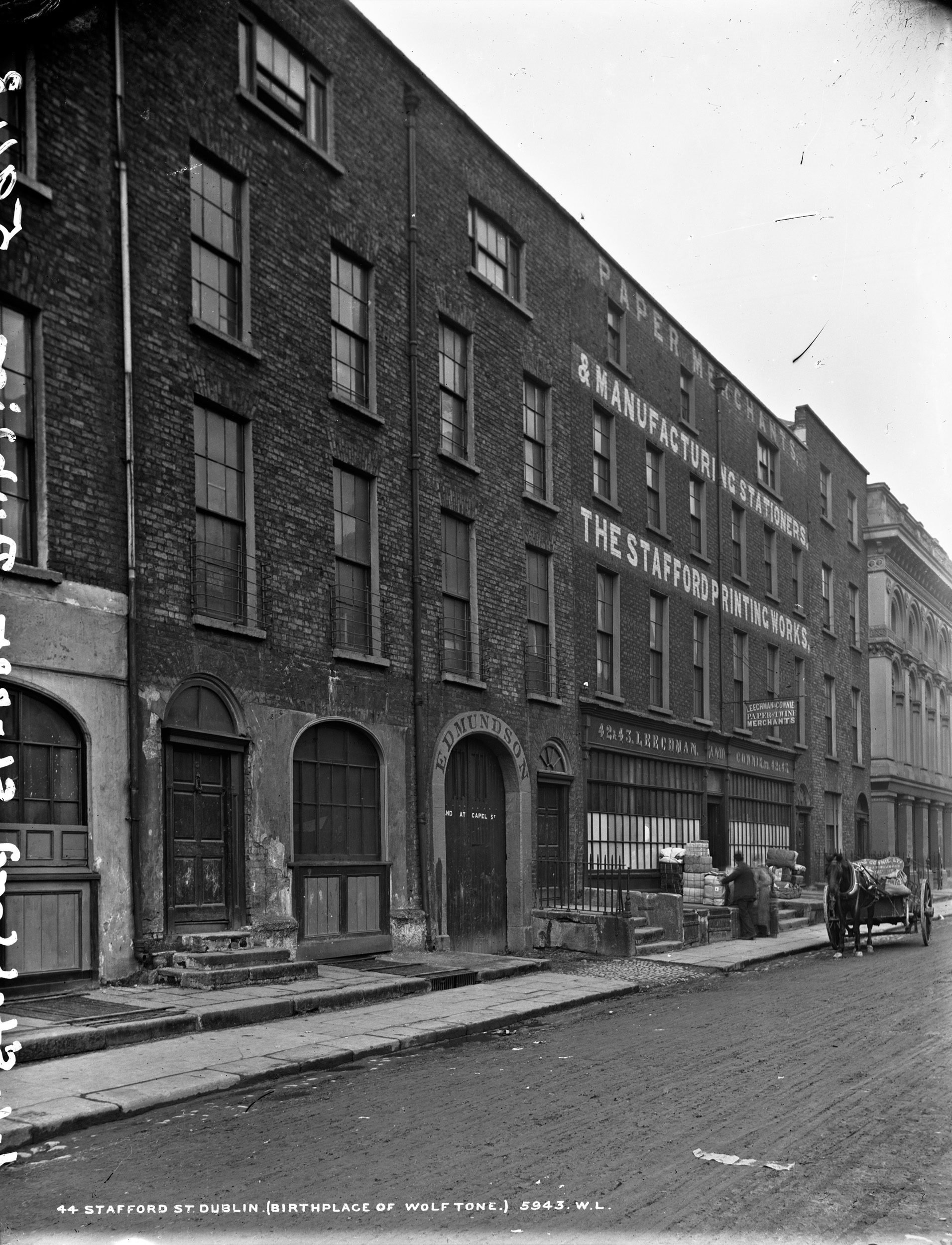
41- 45 Stafford Street (now Wolfe Tone Street), Dublin

Wolfe Tone Street was originally known as Stafford Street, for Sir Hugh Strafford who alongside Sir Humphrey Jervis developed the area starting in 1700. Stafford and Jervis purchased Piphoe's Park and other areas of the St Mary's Abbey in 1674 after the abbey was dissolved. The street first appears on maps in 1728. It was renamed for Theobald Wolfe Tone who lived in number 44 on the street as a child.

On the site of Tone's childhood home now stands Wolfe Tone House, a section of a larger office building dating from around 1930. A shield plaque to Tone, erected by the 98 Centenary Committee, remains on the building. Wolfe Tone House also incorporates a 1970s century office which meets Abbey Street, and a building from 1865 on the corner of Mary Street. The 1970s building was built as the headquarters for the insurance company known then as PMPA. The building was designed by Robin Walker of Scott Tallon Walker Architects, with Miesian influences from Ludwig Mies Van der Rohe, and has a facade of glass and steel. It replaced an earlier office building that suffered fire damage.

A prominent landmark on the street is St Mary's Church and the churchyard. The church is now a restaurant and pub, and the churchyard was redeveloped as Wolfe Tone Square.

A building on the street used by then Department of Justice, Equality and Law Reform was earmarked for use by the probation service, but lay empty after €4 million was spent by 2011.
