= Bodenstown Graveyard =

Graveyard in County Kildare, Ireland

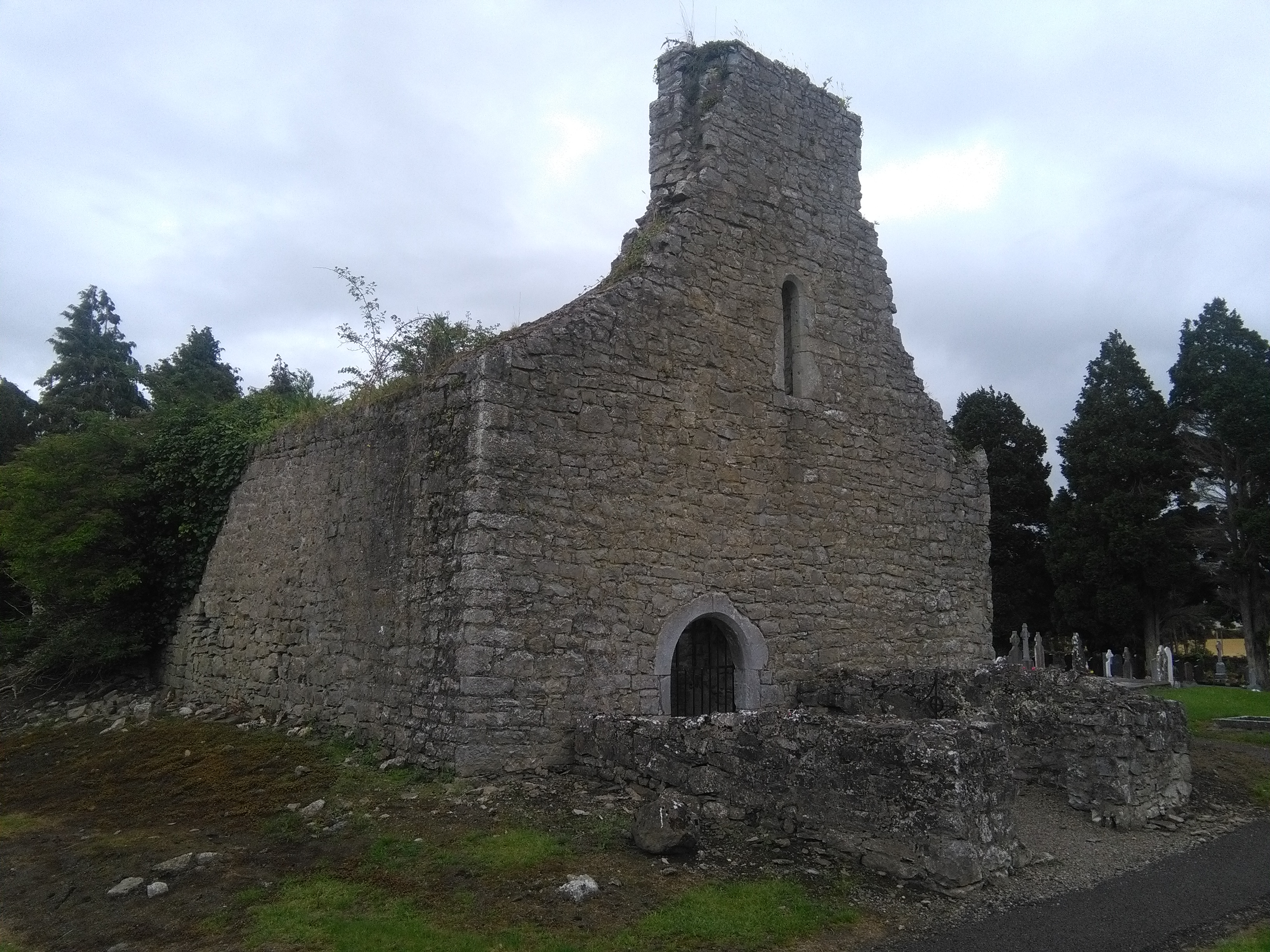
- Church (west gable and north wall)
- Interactive map of Bodenstown Graveyard

Details
- Established: early 14th century?
- Location: Bodenstown, Sallins, County Kildare
- Country: Ireland
- Coordinates: 53°15′58″N 6°39′55″W
- Type: Public
- Size: 0.234 hectares (0.58 acres)
- Find a Grave: Bodenstown Graveyard

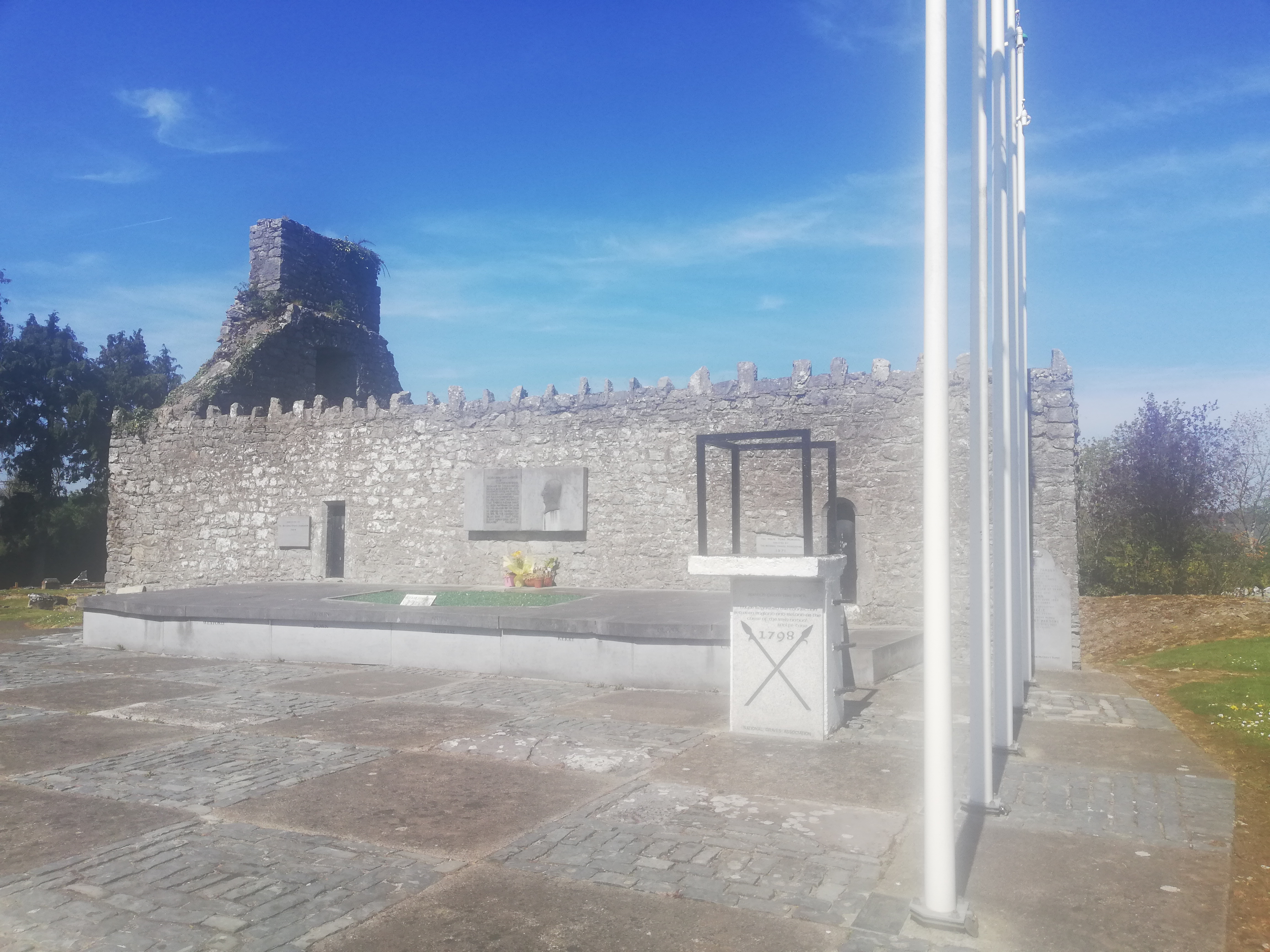
View of the south wall of the church and the speaker's podium

Bodenstown Graveyard (Irish: Reilig Bhaile Uí Bhuadáin) is a cemetery located in County Kildare, Ireland. Containing a ruined medieval church, it is best known as the burial place of the Irish patriot Wolfe Tone (1763–1798).

== History ==
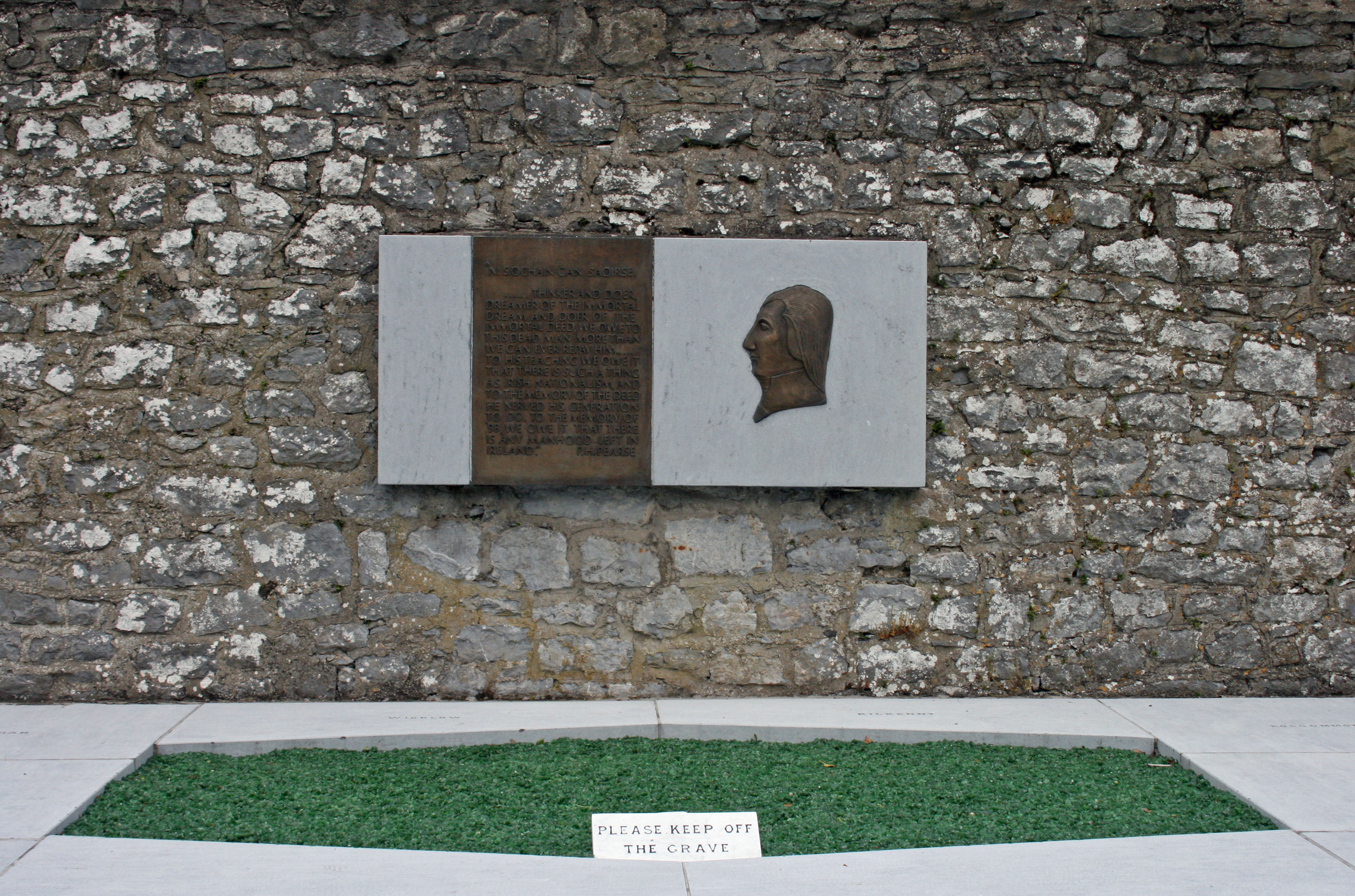
Bronze profile of Wolfe Tone and excerpt from Patrick Pearse's 1915 eulogy at his graveside, installed 2013 on the north wall of the church

The stone church dates to before 1352, in which year it belonged to Great Connell Priory, and measures 12 m (39 ft) by 7 m (23 ft). It was described as being in good condition in 1612 but was ruined by the 19th century; all that remains are the west gable and north and south walls.

After his conviction for treason at a court-martial in Dublin and his subsequent death in November 1798, Tone was buried next to his father at Bodenstown. Semi-official commemorations are believed to have begun in the 1840s. In "Tone's Grave", Thomas Davis describes his visit there c. 1843.

Pilgrimages to Wolfe Tone's graveside were first held in 1873, the 75th anniversary of his death. After gaps in the 1880s, they resumed in 1891, and have been held every year since, except in 1906–10 and 1921. The ceremony, involving a march from Sallins railway station to the graveyard, took place on the Sunday closest to Tone's birthday, 20 June. Since 1922 there have been rival parades on different June Sundays due to schisms within Irish republicanism.

In October 1969, the Tones' tomb was bombed and damaged by the Ulster loyalist UVF. In June 1975, the same group sought to derail a train at near Sallins carrying 250 Official IRA supporters to the annual commemoration, and murdered a witness to their attempt, a local farm labourer, Christopher Phelan. In 2013, the Tone's headstone was replaced with a tomb of Irish limestone and, overlooking it on a church wall, a bronze relief portraying Tone in profile next to an excerpt from Pearse's 1915 eulogy.

There is one British Commonwealth war grave of the First World War, of Private Walter Duffy of the Leinster Regiment, who died on 7 July 1918.

== Notable burials ==
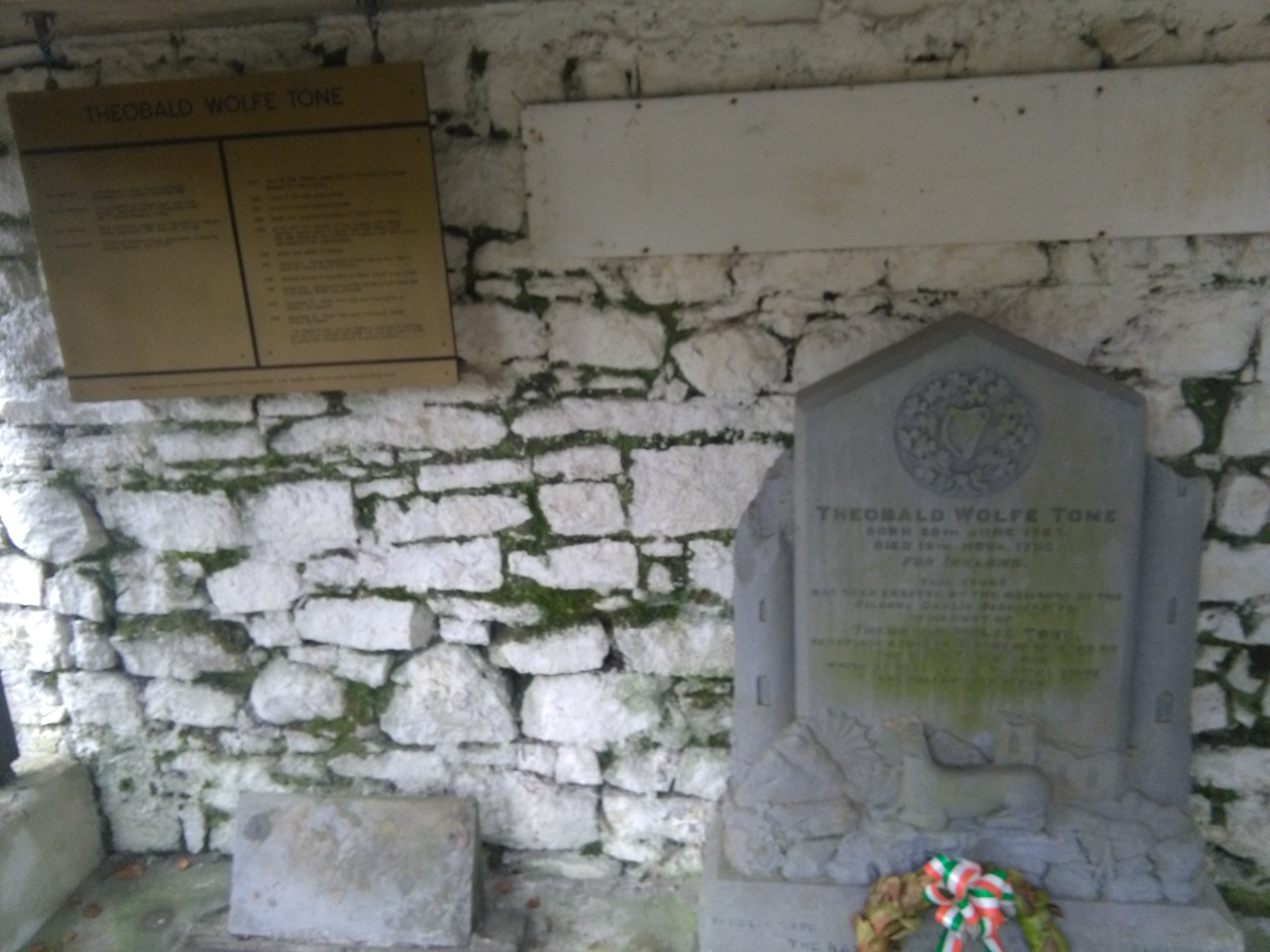
Wolfe Tone's grave

- Theobald Wolfe Tone (1763–1798)
- Private W. J. Duffy of the Prince of Wales's Leinster Regiment, died 7 July 1918
