= Wolfe Tones GAA (Greencastle) =

Wolfe Tones GAC, Greencastle
- CLG Bhúlf Tón, An Caisléan Glas
- Founded: 1931
- County: Antrim
- Nickname: Tones
- Colours: Green and white hoops
- Grounds: Wolfe Tone Park, V36 (Páirc Bhúlf Tón)

Playing kits
Home Kit

Wolfe Tones GAC is a Gaelic Athletic Association (GAA) club in County Antrim.

== History ==
Named after Wolfe Tone, the club was originally established in 1931 and played in the South Antrim leagues. The club won the 1950 Antrim Junior Hurling Championship.

A camogie unit existed alongside the men's teams and won the Antrim Junior Camogie Championship in 1938.

The club continued until the early 1970s when the land its pitch was located on was sold off for development of the M2 Motorway.

In 2020, the club was reformed, entering the South Antrim Leagues until the competition was cancelled due to the Covid-19 pandemic. The men's footballers progressed to the All County League in 2022.

== Gaelic Football ==
The men's team plays in Antrim ACFL Division 3 and the Antrim Junior Championship.

== Hurling ==
In 2024, the hurling team entered the South Antrim leagues.

== Ladies Gaelic Football ==
The LGFA section launched in 2021 and plays in the Antrim LGFA Division 3 and Junior B Championship.

== Rounders ==
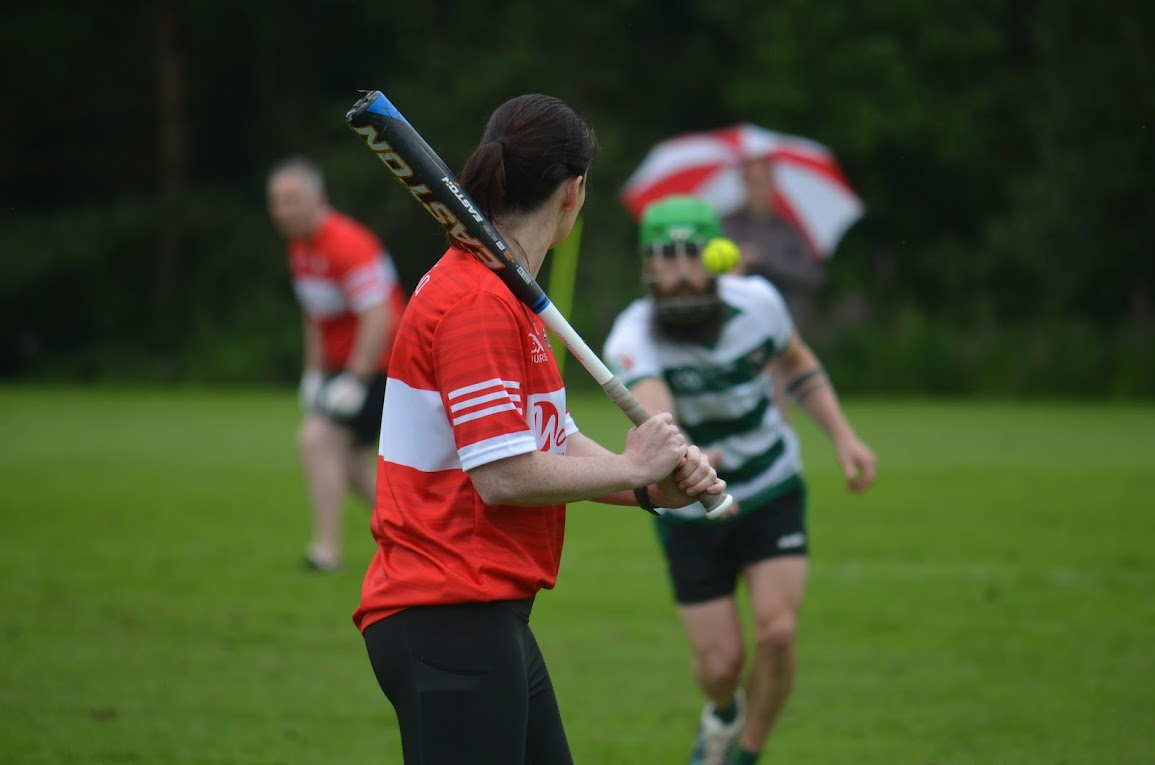
A Wolfe Tones player (green and white) pitches to a Kilrea player in a rounders game, 2024.

Wolfe Tones is the only rounders club in County Antrim. It plays in the All-Ireland Junior Mixed Championship, reaching the quarter final in 2024.

== Honours ==
- Antrim Junior Camogie Championship - 1938
- Antrim Junior Hurling Championship - 1950
- Ulster Junior Mixed Shield - 2024
