= Drumquin Wolfe Tones GAA =

Tyrone-based Gaelic games club

Drumquin Wolfe Tones
- Droim Caoin Uilf Tón
- Founded: 1968
- County: Tyrone
- Nickname: The Tones
- Colours: White & Red
- Grounds: Jim McGirr Park
- Coordinates: 54°36′44.50″N 7°29′28.59″W

Playing kits
Standard	Reserve

Drumquin Wolfe Tones (Irish: Droim Caoin Uilf Tón) is a Gaelic Athletic Association club in Drumquin, County Tyrone, Northern Ireland. The club, a Gaelic football club, plays its home games at Jim McGirr Park, in the townland of Drumnaforbe, in the civil parish of Longfield East. The club fields teams in all age groups from Under-6s up to senior level. The Ladies Gaelic football teams in Drumquin carry the same Wolfe Tones name and play at the same home venue.

== History ==
The club, which was formed in 1968, is named after Theobald Wolfe Tone, who was the leader of United Irishmen during the 1798 Rebellion.

In 1977, the club purchased an 11-acre (4.45-hectare) site and developed it into what is now known as Jim McGirr Park. The ground's spectator stand was built in 1991.

The club won the Tyrone Intermediate Football Championship in 1994.

In September 1999, new clubrooms were opened at Jim McGirr Park. A second pitch was also leased to the club from Omagh District Council for 999 years. In October 2005, a new playing surface was laid on the ground's main pitch. 2005 also saw the construction of a perimeter fence, new goal posts, ball-stops and a turnstile.

After a ten year gap without a Senior Ladies team, the Drumquin Wolfe Tones LGFA team was re-formed in 2019 to compete in the Junior grade.

In 2022, further redevelopment of the club's facilities was undertaken, including a new community gym, the redevelopment of the training pitch and the creation of a walkway around the playing pitches.

As of 2024, the senior men's team was competing in Division 3 of the Tyrone All-County Football League and contesting the Tyrone Junior Football Championship.

== Honours ==
- Tyrone Intermediate Football Championship (1): 1994
- Tyrone Ladies Football Championship (1): 1998
