= Wolfe Tones GAA (Chicago) =

Gaelic Football club in Chicago

Chicago Wolfe Tones
- Bhunf Tón
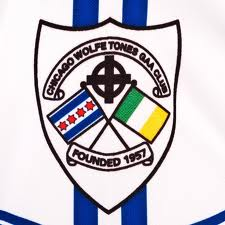
- Founded: 1957
- County: North American
- Division: Central Division Board
- Nickname: The Tones, The Blue Machine
- Colours: Blue & White
- Grounds: Gaelic Park, Chicago
Main kit

The Wolfe Tones GAA club is a Gaelic football club founded in 1957 and which first took the field in the summer of 1958. While not the oldest Gaelic football club in Chicago, the Wolfe Tones is one of the most successful clubs in North America with 22 senior Chicago titles and 13 North American Championships and competing in 17 NCAB finals.

== History ==
The Wolfe Tones won their first American League Title in 1978. Nicknamed "The Blue Machine," they drew players from all counties which was an advantage and in the seventies and eighties were mostly home-based with strong social ties because everyone worked and socialised together.

In the mid-1980s, the club added a Junior team, while the Juniors have not had the same level of success as the Senior team, it has still added to the level of support that the club enjoys and allows many younger Irish-Americans to participate in the rich culture of the GAA. In the late 1990s and early 2000s Mike Mulligan, then of the Chicago Sun Times, wrote that the Wolfe Tones were "a Chicago-based Gaelic football powerhouse".

In past years, the Wolfe Tones main rivals have been the McBrides GFC and the St. Brendan's GFC and, more recently, the Parnell's GFC.

Due to the economic downturn and changes in US Immigration law, GAA clubs in North America have come upon hard times. Despite this, the Wolfe Tones still have been able to field competitive teams.

The 2012 Wolfe Tones won their divisional title in Chicago, but lost to the Ulster GFC of San Francisco in their semi-final match at the NACB Finals in Philadelphia.

== Players ==
The Wolfe Tones have historically fielded competitive teams and have drawn inter-county Gaelic football players from nearly every county in Ireland, going so far as to play in the GAA Golf Tournament. They have also played several challenge games in Ireland.

Inter-county players, that have played for the Wolfe Tones through the years, include:

County Players	County	Province
Jack O'Shea	Kerry	Munster
Val Daly	Galway	Connacht
Graham Geraghty	Meath	Leinster
Seán Cavanagh	Tyrone	Ulster
Nigel Dineen	Roscommon	Connacht
Rory Mone	Monaghan	Ulster
Odhran O'Dwyer	Clare	Munster
Darren Clarke	Louth	Leinster
Peter McGinnity	Louth	Leinster
JP Rooney	Louth	Leinster
James McCartan Jnr	Down	Ulster
Paddy McKeever	Armagh	Ulster
Brian Connor	Offaly	Leinster
Richie Connor	Offaly	Leinster
Matt Connor	Offaly	Leinster
Colm Coyle	Meath	Leinster
George Hannigan	Tipperary	Munster
Kevin O'Brien	Wicklow	Leinster
Paddy Bradley	Derry	Ulster
Tommy Ryan	Donegal	Ulster
Shane Durkin	Sligo	Connacht
Marty Lynch	Kildare	Leinster
David Brady	Mayo	Connacht
Jack Sheedy	Dublin	Leinster
Frankie Griffin	Clare	Munster
David Keenan	Roscommon	Leinster
Dermot Malone	Monaghan	Ulster

== Honours ==
The club has had several successes in North American County Board competitions, having won titles for both their division and in the county. Senior titles, in competitions run by the North American GAA, that have been won by the club include:

Chicago Finals	North American Finals
1962	--
1963	--
1965	--
1969	--
1978	1978
1979	--
1980	1980
1982	1982
1984	--
1985	1985
1988	1988
1991	1991
1992	--
1993	--
1995	1995
1996	1996
1997	1997
1999	1999
2001	2001
2002	2002
2003	--
2006	2006
2012	--
2017	--
2023	2023
2024	2024
