= Wolfe Tone =

Irish revolutionary figure (1763–1798)

Theobald Wolfe Tone
- Bhulbh Teón
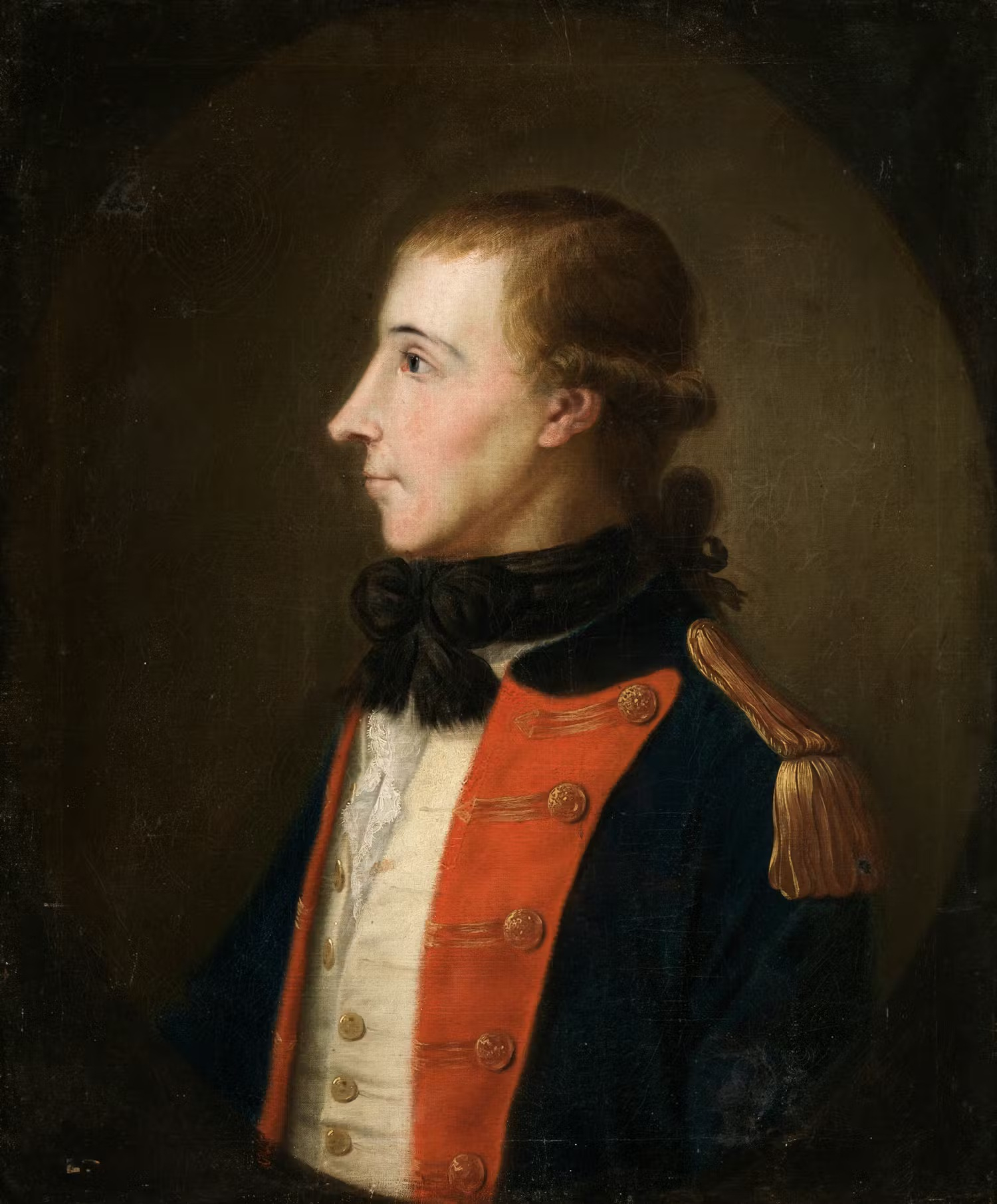
- Portrait of Tone
- Born: Theobald Wolfe Tone; 20 June 1763; Dublin, Ireland
- Died: 19 November 1798 (aged 35); Dublin, Ireland
- Resting place: Bodenstown Graveyard
- Education: Trinity College Dublin (BA); King's Inns
- Agents: Society of United Irishmen; Catholic Committee and Convention
- Spouse: Matilda Tone (m. 1785)
- Military career
- Allegiance: United Irishmen; French Republic
- Rank: chef de brigade
- Conflicts: French Revolutionary Wars; Irish Rebellion of 1798; Battle of Tory Island ‡‡

Theobald Wolfe Tone (Irish: Bhulbh Teón; 20 June 1763 – 19 November 1798), posthumously known as Wolfe Tone, was a revolutionary exponent of Irish independence and is an iconic figure for Irish republicanism. Convinced that if his fellow Protestants feared to make common cause with the Catholic majority, the British Crown would continue to govern Ireland in the English interest, he helped form the Society of United Irishmen in 1791.

Fuelled by the popular grievances of rents, tithes and taxes, driven by martial-law repression, and despairing of reform, the society developed as an insurrectionary movement. When in the early summer of 1798 it broke into open rebellion, Tone was in exile soliciting assistance from the French Republic. In October 1798, on his second attempt to land in Ireland with French troops and supplies, he was taken prisoner. Sentenced to be hanged, he died from a reportedly self-inflicted wound.

Since the mid-19th century, his name has been invoked, and his legacy disputed, by different factions of Irish republicanism. These have held annual, but separate, commemorations at his graveside in Bodenstown, County Kildare.

== Early life ==
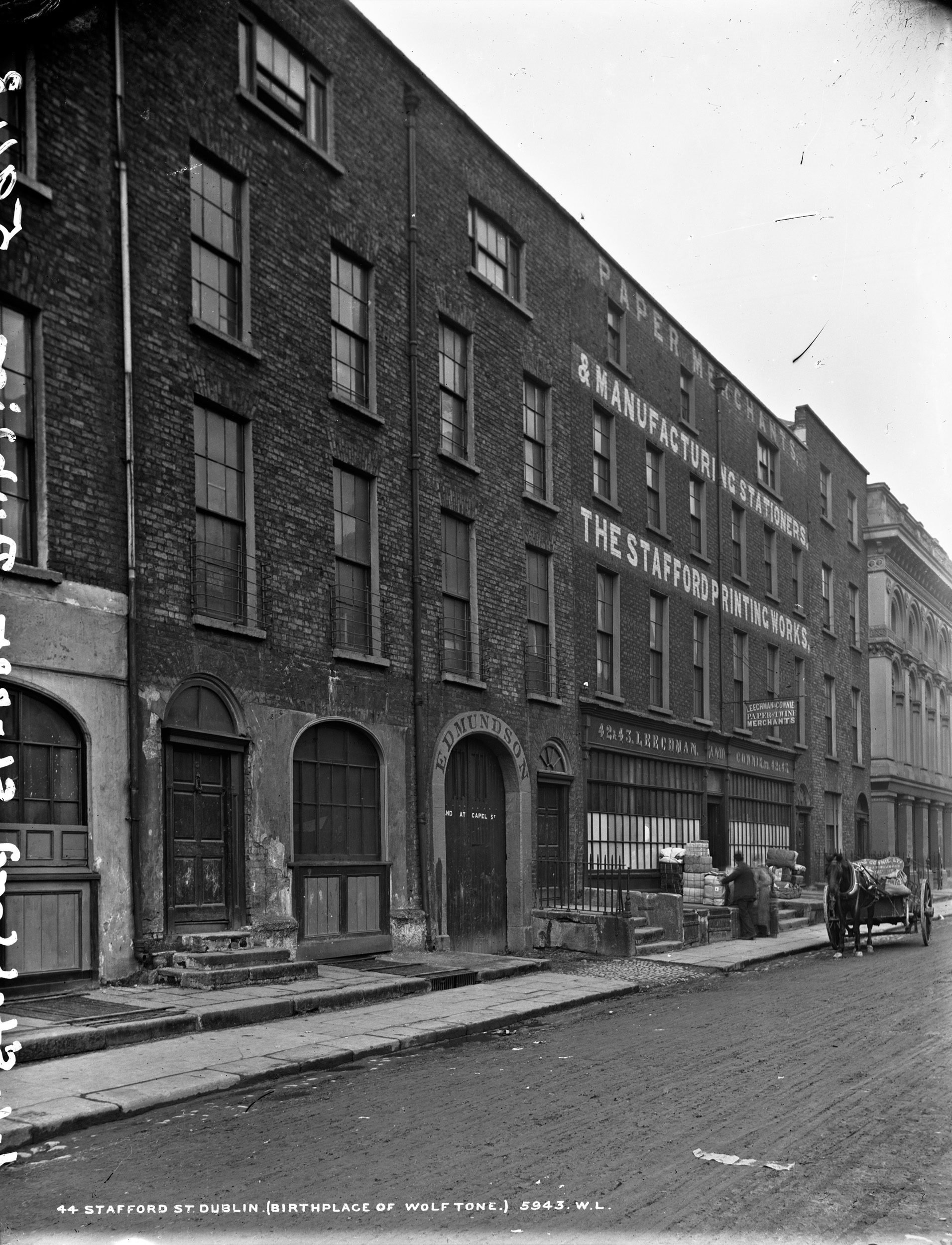
44 Stafford Street (today Wolfe Tone House on Wolfe Tone Street) Dublin where Wolfe Tone was said to have been born.

Tone (who pronounced his first name as "Tibbald" rather than the modern "Thee-uh-bawld") was born on 20 June 1763. His father, Peter Tone, was a prosperous coach-maker who had a farm near Sallins, County Kildare and was a member of the established Anglican church. Although records are absent, he is said to have been the descendant of a Cromwellian soldier ("the first Tone to settle in Ireland") and of French Huguenot refugees. His mother, Margaret Lamport, the daughter of a sea captain in the West India trade, was a Catholic. According to Tone's early biographer, R.R. Madden, she converted to her husband's church only when Tone was already eight years old. Tone, nonetheless, was baptised a Protestant, with the name Theobald Wolfe in honour of his godfather, Theobald Wolfe of Blackhall, County Kildare, a first cousin of Arthur Wolfe, 1st Viscount Kilwarden.

In 1783, Tone found work as a tutor in the home of Richard Martin, a Patriot member of the Irish Parliament for Jamestown, County Leitrim. Tone fell in love with Martin's well-connected wife, Elizabeth Vesey. While Tone later wrote that it came to nothing, a Martin biographer suspects that he was the father of the Martins' first child Laetitia born in 1785.

Tone studied law at Trinity College Dublin, where Kilwarden remembered him as a "sparkling conversationalist and rising talent". He was active in the College Historical Society, which had a record for honing oratory skills and preparing members for a life in politics. In 1784, he was made a scholar and graduated BA in 1786. After training in London's Middle Temple, in 1788 he qualified in Dublin's King's Inns as a barrister, a profession with which he was already disenchanted.

As a student, Tone had eloped with Martha (Matilda) Witherington, daughter of a prominent Dublin merchant. When they married, he was 22, and Matilda was about 16. With the arrival of their first daughter, and his father's bankruptcy denying him an inheritance, he cast about for new employment. To British Prime Minister William Pitt, in 1788 he submitted a plan for a Roman-style military colony on Captain Cook's newly reported Sandwich Islands. When this elicited no response, he sought enlistment as a soldier in the East India Company but applied too late in the year to be shipped to south Asia. Styling himself an "independent Irish Whig", he followed the example of a number of college friends and began reporting on the proceedings of the Irish Parliament and the conduct of the London-appointed Dublin Castle executive.

== United Irishman ==
=== Invitation to Belfast ===
In July 1790 in the visitors' gallery in the Irish House of Commons, Tone met Thomas Russell, a disillusioned East India Company veteran. He found Russell equally critical of the proceedings in the chamber below. Henry Grattan's reform-minded Patriots were floundering in their efforts to build upon the legislative independence from England (the "Constitution of 1782") that the Volunteer militia movement had helped secure. Tone later described the encounter with Russell as "one of the most fortunate" in his life.

With Russell providing the introductions, in October 1791 Tone addressed a small reform club in Belfast. Members were Protestant "Dissenters" from the established church, Presbyterians who, notwithstanding sometimes substantial commercial property, had no elected representation. Belfast was a parliamentary borough in the "pocket" of the town's proprietor, the Marquess of Donegall. They had coalesced around the proposal of one of their number, now resident in Dublin, William Drennan, for "a benevolent conspiracy, a plot for the people" dedicated to "the Rights of Man" and to "Real Independence" for Ireland.

=== An Argument on behalf of the Catholics of Ireland ===
The Belfast club had invited Tone as the author of An Argument on behalf of the Catholics of Ireland. It was a tract which they had helped publish and which had appeared, in their honour, as the work of "a Northern Whig". With an eventual print-run of 16,000, in Ireland only Thomas Paine's Rights of Man (described by Tone as the "Koran of Belfast") surpassed it in circulation.

The Argument embraced what had been the most advanced Volunteer position: that the key to constitutional reform was Catholic emancipation. So long as "illiberal", "bigoted" and "blind" Irish Protestants indulged their fears of "Popery" and of Catholic repossession, the "boobies and blockheads" in Parliament and Dublin Castle would prevail. The choice was stark: either "Reform, the Catholics, justice and liberty" or "an unconditional submission to the present, and every future administration".

Tone was himself suspicious of Catholic priests (regretting that the Irish people had been "bound" to them by persecution) and hostile to what he saw as "Papal tyranny" (In 1798, he was to applaud Napoleon's deposition and imprisonment of Pope Pius VI). But the Argument presents the French Revolution as evidence that a Catholic people need not endure clericalism: in the French National Assembly, as in the American Congress, "Catholic and Protestant sit equally". It also recalls the Patriot Parliament summoned by James II in 1689. When Irish Catholics had a clearer title to what had been forfeit not ninety but forty years before (in the Cromwellian Settlement), they did not use the opportunity to pursue the wholesale return of their lost estates. As for the existing Irish Parliament "where no Catholic can by law appear", it was the clearest proof that "Protestantism is no guard against corruption".

In short, in "the days illumination" the sectarian lessons of the rebellion of 1641 were no longer applicable.

=== First resolutions ===
Calling themselves, at his suggestion, the Society of the United Irishmen, and approving Tone's draft resolutions, his hosts declared that "we have no national government — we are ruled by Englishmen, and the servants of Englishmen". The sole constitutional remedy was "an equal representation of all the people in parliament"—"a complete and radical reform". They urged others to follow their example: to "form similar Societies in every quarter of the kingdom for the promotion of Constitutional knowledge, the abolition of bigotry in religion and policies, and the equal distribution of the Rights of Man through all Sects and Denominations of Irishmen".

Summarised by James Napper Tandy as "all Irishmen citizens, all citizens Irishmen", the same resolutions were carried three weeks later at a meeting in Dublin. Present were John Keogh, John Sweetman and other leading members of the city's Catholic Committee.

=== Secretary to the Catholic Committee ===
In the new year, 1792, the Catholic Committee appointed Tone as an assistant secretary. He replaced Richard Burke, the son of Edmund Burke to whose critical Reflections on the Revolution in France, Paine's Rights of Man had been a response.

In December 1792, with the support and participation of United Irishmen, Tone helped the Committee in Dublin stage a national Catholic Convention. Elected on a broad, head-of-household, franchise, the "Back Lane Parliament" was seen to challenge the legitimacy of the Irish Lords and Commons. The impression was confirmed when the convention decided to make its appeal directly to London where the government, in advance of war with revolutionary France, had signalled a willingness to solicit Catholic opinion. In January 1793, Tone was included in the Convention delegation that, after being hosted by Presbyterian supporters in Belfast, was received by George III at Windsor. It was an audience with which, at the time, Tone believed he had "every reason to be content".

Through its appointed Dublin Castle executive, the British government pressed the Irish Parliament to match Westminster's 1791 Catholic Relief Act. This lifted the sacramental bar to the legal profession, to military commissions and, in the limited number of constituencies not in the "pockets" of either landed grandees or the government, to the property franchise, but not yet to Parliament itself or to senior Crown offices. But there was a substantial price to be paid for the passage, in April 1793, of similar legislation in Ireland.

In the wake of the 1793 Relief Act, the Catholic Committee voted Tone a sum of £1,500 with a gold medal, subscribed to a statue of the King and, as agreed in London, voted to dissolve. The government then passed legislation raising militia regiments by a compulsory ballot system and outlawing extra-parliamentary conventions and independent militia. United Irishmen at the time were seeking to revive the Volunteer movement on the model of the French National Guard.

=== Separatist and conspirator ===
In May 1794, evidence laid against Tone helped the government justify its proscription of the Society. In July 1793, the Lord Chancellor of Ireland, John FitzGibbon, Earl of Clare, had seized upon Tone's suggestion in a letter to Russell that independence "would be the regeneration to this country", to denounce all United Irishmen as committed separatists. Tone protested, but only by way of endorsing a connection to England where it did not involve the "gross corruption in the legislature" and the "sacrifice of [Ireland’s] interests to England". In April 1794, he was found to have been meeting in the prison cell of Archibald Hamilton Rowan (a fellow United man serving time for seditious libel) with William Jackson. An Anglican clergyman radicalised by his experience of revolutionary Paris, Jackson came to Ireland to ascertain to the potential support for a French invasion. Tone had drawn up a memorandum for Jackson testifying to the readiness of the country to rise, the Presbyterians being "steady republicans, devoted to liberty" and the Catholics "ready for any change because no change can make them worse".

An attorney named Cockayne, to whom Jackson had disclosed his mission, betrayed the memorandum to the government. In April 1794 Jackson was arrested on a charge of treason and dramatically committed suicide during his trial. Rowan, and two other parties to the conspiracy, Napper Tandy and James Reynolds, managed to flee the country. None of the incriminating papers seized were in Tone's handwriting. Also, while entertaining hopes of serving Francis Rawdon, Lord Moira, as a private secretary, Tone had not attended meetings of the Dublin Society of United Irishmen since May 1793. (Rawdon, who had hosted the Catholic delegation in London, had been a rumoured replacement for the Earl of Westmorland as Viceroy in Dublin).

Tone remained in Ireland until after the trial of Jackson but was advised by Kilwarden that to avoid prosecution he should leave. In an agreement brokered by a former Trinity friend, Marcus Beresford, he was permitted to remove himself to the United States in return for giving an account of his role in the Jackson affair, albeit without breaking confidences or naming names.

Before leaving, in June 1795 Tone and his family travelled to Belfast. At the summit of Cavehill overlooking the town, Tone with Thomas Russell and three other members of the movement's Ulster executive, Samuel Neilson, Henry Joy McCracken and Robert Simms, took the celebrated pledge "never to desist in our efforts until we had subverted the authority of England over our country, and asserted our independence".

Responding to the growing repression, the northern executive had endorsed a "new system of organisation". Local societies were to split so as to remain within a range of 7 to 35 members, and through baronial and county delegate committees, build toward a provincial, and, ultimately, a national, directory. Beginning with an obligation of each society to drill a company, and of three companies to form a battalion, this structure was in turn adapted to military preparation.

In this form, the society replicated rapidly across Ulster and, eventually, from Dublin out into the midlands and the south. As it did so, William Drennan's "test" or pledge, calling for "a union of power among Irishmen of every religious persuasion", was administered to artisans, journeymen and shopkeepers, many of whom had maintained their own Jacobin clubs, and to tenant farmers and their market-town allies who had organised against the Anglican gentry in secret fraternities. These were the "numerous and respectable class of the community, the men of no property" that Tone, despairing of his own creed and class, believed would ultimately carry the struggle.

== Revolutionary exile ==
=== Impressions of America ===
In August 1795, Tone took up residence in Philadelphia, the then-capital of the United States, where he found himself in the company of Rowan, Tandy, and Reynolds. Tone was instantly disillusioned. He found the Americans to be a "churlish, unsociable race totally absorbed in making money", and was appalled by the reactionary anti-French sentiment of George Washington and his Federalist Party allies—a "mercantile peerage"—entrenched in the U.S. Senate. His sympathies were with the Democratic-Republican opposition that was beginning to form around Thomas Jefferson and James Madison.

Tone bought a farm near Princeton, New Jersey, an area made desirable by the attraction of "a college and some good society", and thought to spend the approaching winter writing a history of the Catholic Committee. But letters received from John Keogh and Thomas Russell persuaded him to resume his revolutionary mission. With the support of the French minister in Philadelphia, Pierre Adet, on New Year's Day 1796, he sailed for France.

=== Lobbies the French Directory ===
When in February he arrived in Paris, Tone found that, forwarded by Adet, his Memorials on the State of Ireland had already come to the attention of Lazare Carnot, one of five members of the then governing Directory. Tone was not aware of it at the time, but his picture of Ireland as primed for liberation was being reinforced by the still more enthusiastic reports from two new United militants, formerly in the ranks of Grattan parliamentary opposition, Lord Edward Fitzgerald and Arthur O'Connor.

By May, General Henri Clarke, the Irish-descendant head of the War Ministry's Bureau Topographique, had drafted an invasion plan. In June, Carnot offered General Lazare Hoche command of an expedition that would secure "the safety of France for centuries to come". According to a French sympathiser, Tone's enthusiasm for the venture was qualified by "the express condition that the French should come to Ireland as allies, and should act under direction of the new government, as Rochambeau had done in America". Tone had already recorded his resolve never to be an "accessory to subjecting my country to the control of France merely to get rid of England".

=== Hoche's expedition to Ireland ===
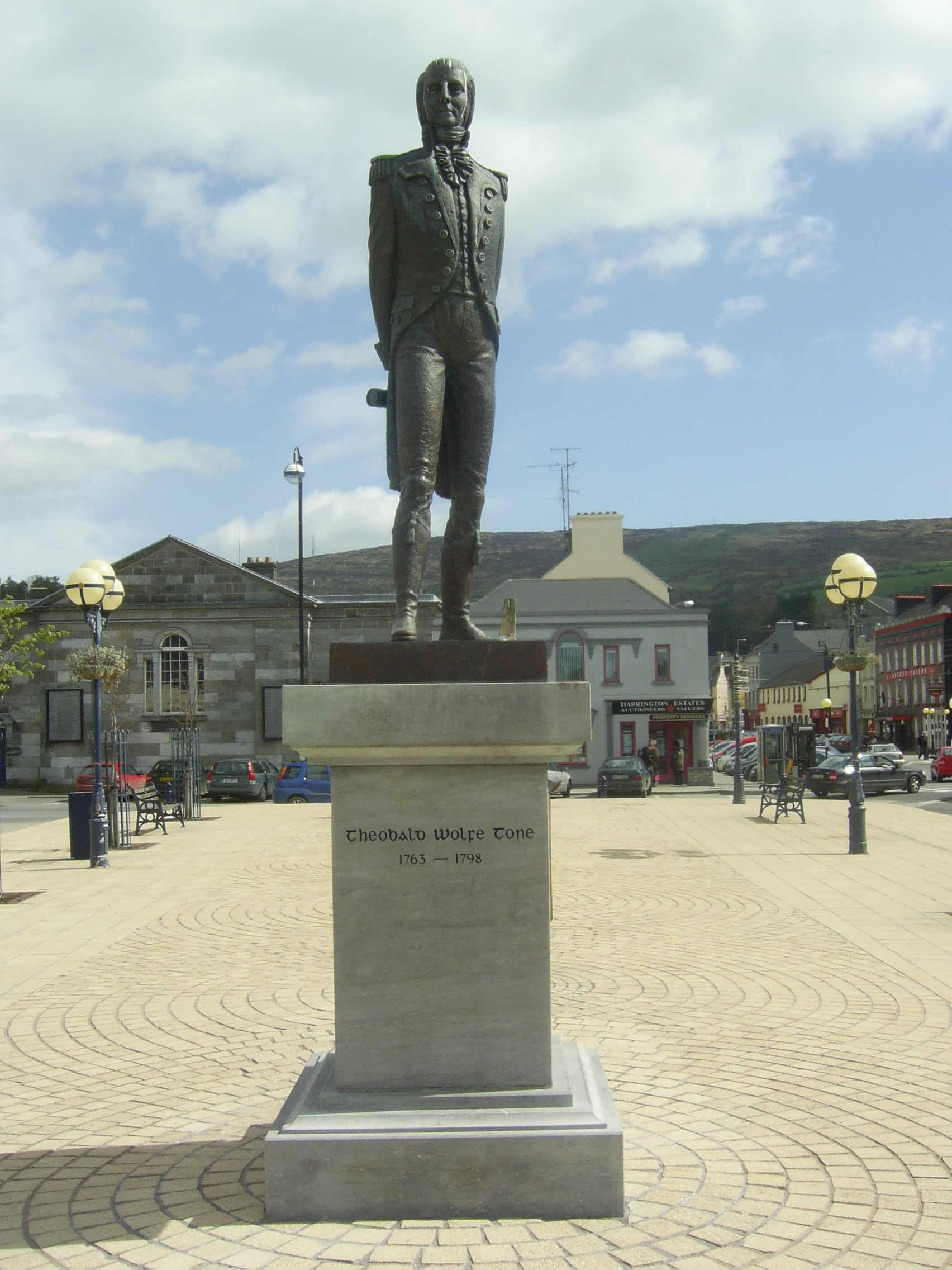
Statue of Tone, Bantry, County Cork

On 15 December 1796, an expedition under Hoche, consisting of 44 ships and carrying between 12,000 and 25,000 troops with a large supply of war material for distribution in Ireland, sailed from Brest. Accompanied by Tone, commissioned as a chef de brigade in the service of the French republic, it arrived off the coast of Ireland at Bantry Bay on 22 December 1796. Unremitting storms prevented a landing. Tone remarked that "England [...] had its luckiest escape since the Armada". The fleet returned home and the army intended to spearhead the invasion of Ireland was split up and sent, along with a growing Irish Legion, to fight in other theatres of the French Revolutionary Wars.

Tone served for some months in the French army under Hoche, who had become the French Republic's minister of war after his victory against the Austrians at the Battle of Neuwied on the Rhine in April 1797. In June 1797, Tone took part in preparations for a military expedition to Ireland from the Batavian Republic, the French-client successor state to the Dutch Republic. However, the Batavian fleet under Vice-Admiral Jan de Winter was delayed in the harbour of Texel island that summer by unfavourable easterly winds and from mid-August by a British North-Sea fleet blockade. After Tone and other troops assembled had disembarked, it eventually put to sea in the hope of reaching the French naval base at Brest, only to be destroyed by Admiral Adam Duncan in the Battle of Camperdown on 11 October 1797. Hoche who, straying from Tone's plans for Ireland, had begun to consider descent upon Scotland (where following the Irish example, radicals had formed the United Scotsmen), had died of tuberculosis on 19 September. It was a loss Tone considered "irreparable to the Irish cause".

=== Rivalries in Paris ===
Back in Paris, Tone recognised the rising star of Napoleon Bonaparte, but was unable to deflect the conqueror of Italy from his grander vision of still greater conquests in the East. In May 1798, with the men and materiel that might have made possible another descent upon Ireland, Bonaparte sailed for Egypt. Bonaparte was later to claim that he might have been persuaded to sail for Ireland had the United Irish agents in Paris not constantly quarrelled among themselves.

After his return from Bantry, Tone had been joined by a co-conspirator in the Jackson affair, Edward Lewines accredited by the Leinster directory in Dublin. With Lewines heavily reliant on Tone for introductions, Tone was unchallenged as a representative of the Irish cause until, returning again to Paris from Texel, he found Tandy recently arrived from the United States.

Willing to exaggerate his military experience, his standing in Ireland, and the readiness of the country to rise, Tandy appeared the more imposing figure. He won over the radical luminaries in exile, Thomas Paine and the Scottish republican and escaped convict, Thomas Muir, but also—and critically—new arrivals from Ulster. These included James Coigly, Arthur McMahon, John Tennent and Bartholomew Teeling. Witness to General Lake's "dragooning of Ulster", they insisted that the movement in Ireland had to act, if necessary in advance of the French, or face the break-up of its entire system. It was an outlook (further encouraged by Coigly's reports of radical societies ready to act in England and Scotland) more in keeping with the policy of the French. After Bantry Bay, they were waiting for reports of a rising in Ireland before again hazarding their own troops.

== Death ==
=== Bompart's expedition to Ireland and arrest ===
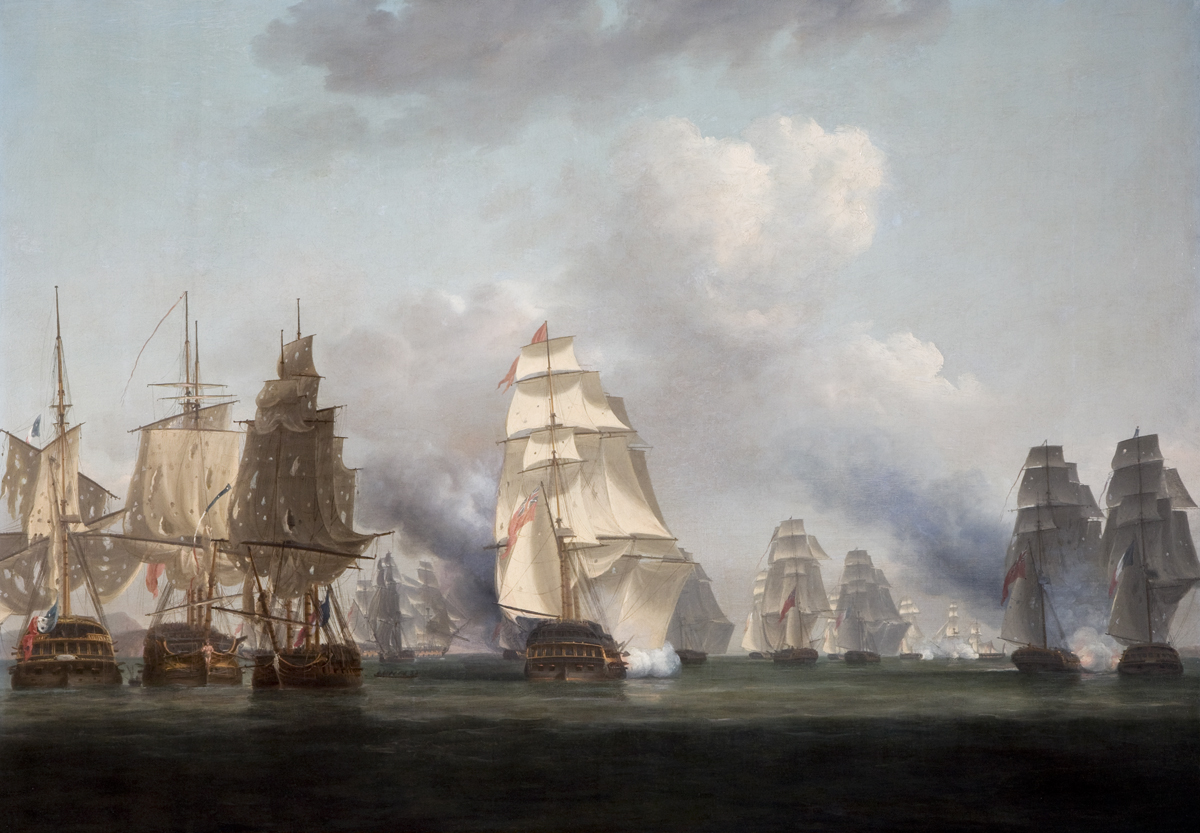
Battle of Tory Island by Nicholas Pocock

When, in the spring of 1798, the Leinster directory bent under the pressure of the same martial-law measures applied to the south and called for a general insurrection on 23 May, Tone was in the dark. The most that he and the other Irish lobbyists had won from the Directory was the undertaking that once the news was received that the country had risen, they would seek to break through to the more open Atlantic coast of Ireland and land smaller numbers of men and supplies. In late August 1798, General Jean Humbert succeeded in landing with a force of approximately 1,000 near Killala, County Mayo. He advanced into the country but, once it was clear that the main rebel conjunctions in Ulster and Leinster had already been decisively defeated, he surrendered. Among the Irish prisoners taken were Teeling and Tone's brother Matthew. They were both court-martialled and hanged.

A second still smaller expedition, accompanied by Tandy, touched land in Donegal on 16 September but departed on the news of Humbert's defeat. Six days before, Tone had embarked with Admiral Jean-Baptiste-François Bompart and General Jean Hardy in command of a force of about 3,000 men. They encountered a British squadron at Buncrana on Lough Swilly on 12 October 1798. Tone, on the ship Hoche, refused Bompart's offer of escape in a frigate. In the ensuing battle of Tory Island he commanded one of the ship's batteries until, isolated and crippled after several hours of bombardment, the ship struck and Bompart surrendered. Two weeks later, held with his fellow French officers in the privy-quarters of Lord Cavan's in Letterkenny, he was recognised by Sir George Hill, a Member of Parliament (and a leading member of the new Orange Order) and was arrested.

=== Trial and death ===
At his court-martial in Dublin on 8 November 1798, Tone defended his desire to separate Ireland from Great Britain "in fair and open war" and his honour.

I entered into the service of the French Republic with the sole view of being useful to my country. To contend against British Tyranny, I have braved the fatigues and terrors of the field of battle; I have sacrificed my comfort, have courted poverty, have left my wife unprotected, and my children without a father. After all I have done for a sacred cause, death is no sacrifice. In such enterprises, everything depends on success: Washington succeeded – Kosciusko failed. I know my fate, but I neither ask for pardon nor do I complain.

His one "regret" was the "very great atrocities" committed in the course of the summer rebellion, "on both sides". For "a fair and open war" he had been prepared; but if that had "degenerated into a system of assassination, massacre, and plunder" he did "most sincerely lament it".

His one request was that, as a ranking French officer, he might "die the death of a soldier" and be shot. The request was denied: found guilty of treason he was condemned to hang on the 12th. On what was to be the morning of his execution he was found with a wound to his throat, the result—although later a subject of some speculation—of an apparent attempt to take his own life. The story goes that the doctor who bound the wound told Tone that if he talked it would re-open and he would bleed to death, to which Tone replied: "I can yet find words to thank you sir; it is the most welcome news you could give me. What should I wish to live for?".

Theobald Wolfe Tone died on 19 November 1798 at the age of 35 in the Provost Prison of the Royal Barracks, Dublin, not far from where he was born. He is buried in the family plot in Bodenstown, County Kildare, near his birthplace at Sallins, and his grave is in the care of the National Graves Association.

== Political vision ==
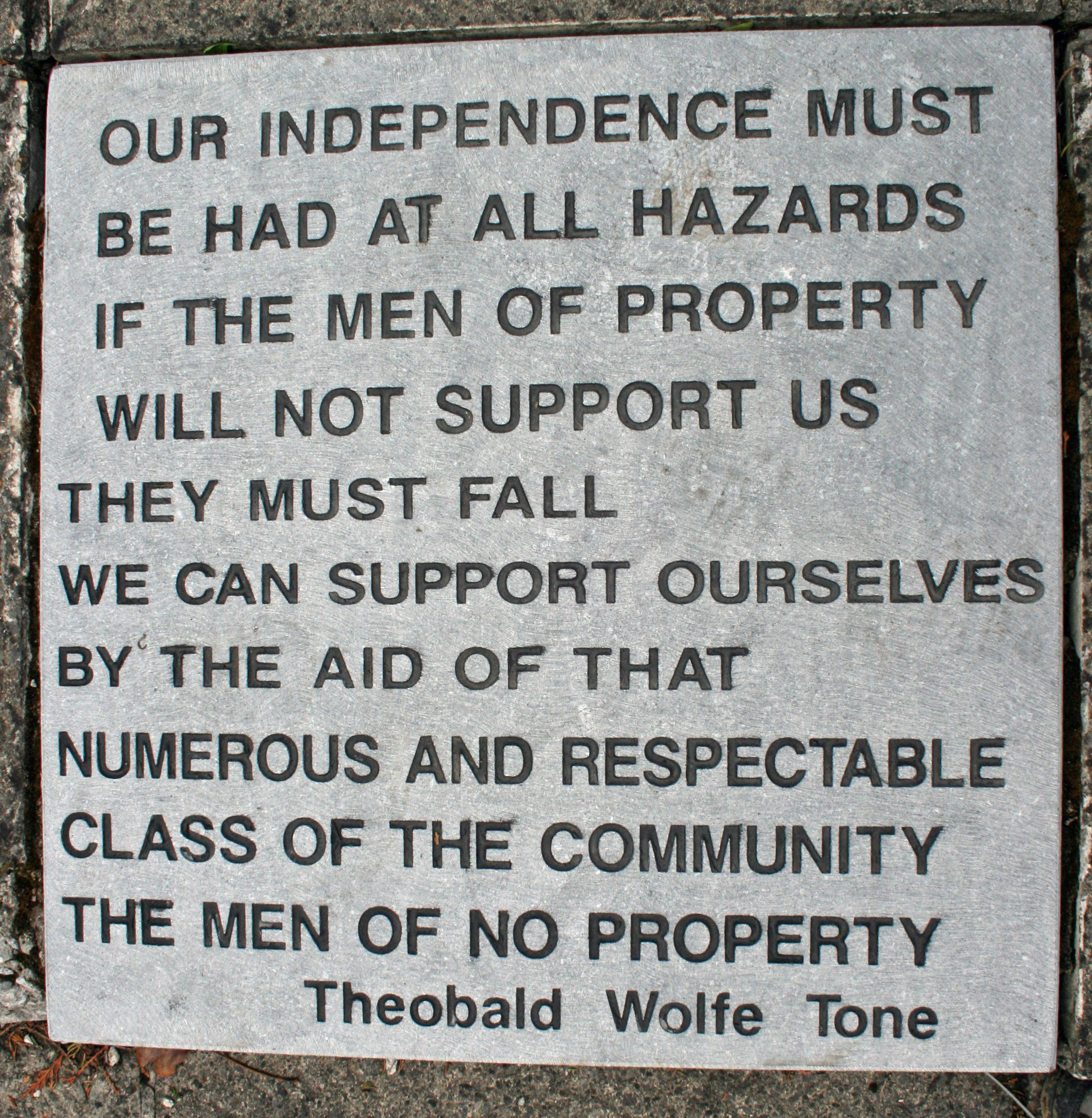
One of the inscribed flagstones on the steps leading to the grave of Theobald Wolfe Tone

=== Equality and representation ===
Later generations of Irish republicans have broadly been content with Tone's own succinct summary of his purpose:

To subvert the tyranny of our execrable government, to break the connection with England (the never failing source of our political evils) and to assert the independence of my country—these were my objects. To unite the whole people of Ireland: to abolish the memory of all past dissension; and to substitute the common name of Irishmen in place of the denomination of Protestant, Catholic and Dissenter—these were my means.

In the autobiography he began to compose in France, Tone claimed that already in 1790 he had advanced "the question of separation with scarcely any reserve". While not yet rejecting a personal union of crowns, in his tract The Spanish War (1790) he had disputed Ireland's obligation to support Britain in the Nootka Crisis with Spain and had called for a separate Irish navy.

Beginning with James Connolly, who maintained that Tone would have been "a rebel even had he been an Englishman", left-wing republicans have suggested that for Tone, Irish independence was part of a broader radical vision. Typically reference is made to his diary entry for 11 March 1796: "If the men of property will not support us, they must fall; we can support ourselves by the aid of that numerous and respectable class of the community, the men of no property". He is also recorded as telling the French that a revolution in Ireland "was not to be made for the people of property".

While acknowledging the need for their support, it is not clear that Tone wished those "of no property" to take the initiative. Russell's diary records a despondent conversation in January 1794 in which Tone remarked: there is "nothing to be expected from this country except from the sans culottes, who are too ignorant for any thinking man to wish to see in power".

Tone did not abandon Whig constitutionalism, so long as the talk was of reform. In 1792, in an address to Volunteers, he disclaimed any intention of invading the "just prerogatives of our monarch" or the "constitutional powers of the peers of the realm". As a condition of Catholic emancipation he had even offered that the greater part of a non-confessional Irish electorate be disenfranchised. Anticipating the terms under which Catholics were eventually admitted to a United Kingdom parliament in 1829, his Argument proposed raising the property (or tenure equivalent) threshold for the vote fivefold to match the English ten-pound freehold. As Daniel O'Connell was to do in 1829, Tone suggested that raising the qualification would allow the "sound and respectable part of the Catholic community" to recover its proper place and weight in society.More than this, it would also purge the Protestant interest of "the gross and feculent mass" of forty-shilling freeholders. As these could be driven to the polls by their landlords, "as much their property as the sheep or the bullocks which they brand with their names", Wolfe may have reasoned that was lost in democratic principle was gained in the practical check on the ability of the squirearchy to swamp county-seat elections.

Even when set on an insurrectionary path, Tone expressed no wish to unsettle property in Ireland. As "petty despots", unable to see beyond "their rent rolls, their places, their patronage and their pensions", he suggested to General Clarke that the gentry ran the risk of a "general massacre and a distribution of their entire property". This he would hope to avoid, for not only would he abhor the bloodshed, but he believed that the prospect of retaining property in Ireland might blunt resistance. He recommended that the French on landing, and a provisional convention that would then be called, offer not only resident landowners but also to the absentee lords in England, security for their estates. General Hoche could otherwise reckon "on all the opposition" that men of property could give him.

Tone approved the advance of peasant proprietorship under the French Republic, and may broadly have shared Jefferson's faith in the republican virtues of independent smallholders. But he insisted that the United society he had known in Ireland had never "entertained" ideas of "a distribution of property and an agrarian law", and he advanced no such scheme himself. He ventured no more than relief from that "pest on agriculture", the tithes levied on top of rents by the landlord's established church.

In general, Tone appears to have followed the resolve of the Dublin Society of United Irishmen to "attend those things in which we all agree, [and] to exclude those in which we differ", and consequently to avoid directly engaging questions of economic inequality. From France, he wrote tracts addressed to the weavers of the Liberties in Dublin. These expressed sympathy for their hardships. but James Hope, the self-educated weaver who organised in the Liberties, did not place Tone alongside his friend Russell as one of those "few" United Irish leaders who "perfectly" understood the real causes of social disorder: "the conditions of the labouring class".

As was the case with the Dublin society, Tone proposed an independent and representative government as a sufficient promise of redress regardless of the grievance. For Tone, the promise appears to have been not, scarcely conceptualised, agrarian or labour reform, but the promotion of education (Tone imagined the polymath Whitley Stokes as the head of a national system) and a vigorous mercantile policy in defence of Irish trade and industry.

It is matter of speculation as to what Tone, who prided himself on being a political pragmatist, would have found expedient in an Irish republic. In France, he criticised the Directory, not for a constitution that reintroduced the property franchise abolished with the monarchy, but for suffering themselves "to be insulted in the most outrageous manner" by the unsanctioned press. "It is less dangerous", he wrote, "for a government to be feared, or even hated, than despised". His recent biographer, Marianne Elliott, notes that Tone applauded the Directory's suppression in April 1796 of Babeuf's proto-socialist conspiracy. This is consistent with what she concludes was a commitment to equality in Tone that did not truly extend beyond the abolition of aristocratic and confessional privilege.

=== Monarchy or republic ===
Questioning whether Tone had "any sustained interest in republicanism as a form of government", the popular historian Andrew Boyd notes that, at the time the United Irishmen were formed, Tone confessed that his objective was not "the establishment of a republic" but to "secure the independence of Ireland under any form of government". Four years later when, believing that "the people of Ireland were in general very ignorant", General Clarke asked whether "we might choose a king", Tone's response was notably pragmatic.

The only person with the least chance of fulfilling such a role, in Tone's view, was Lord Moira (after whom Tone had named his fourth child Francis Rawdon Tone). But the Patriot aristocrat had "blown his reputation to pieces by accepting a command against France". Tone's larger objection to an Irish crown was that the Dissenters, who he was in no doubt would "direct the public sentiment in framing a government", were "thoroughly enlightened and sincere republicans". He thought it "absurd" to suggest, as Clarke had done in his instructions to Hoche, that a member of the House of Stuart could be found who would be agreeable to all parties.

To Tone's dismay from Humbert's account of his misadventure in September 1798, the Directory concluded that the Irish were indeed more Jacobite than Jacobin: that they might be compared with the devoutly Catholic and royalist peasantry they had battled at home in the Vendée. Tone had again to rebuff the suggestion of a Jacobite restoration—that the Catholic Pretender, Henry Benedict Stuart, be recognised as Henry IX, King of the Irish.

== Legacy ==
=== Nineteenth century ===
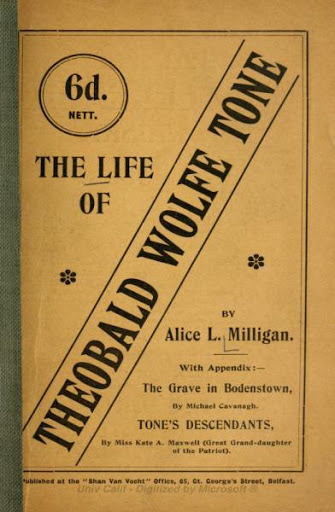
Alice Milligan, 1898 Wolfe biography

Praising his courage and his "keen" and "lucid" judgement, the otherwise unsympathetic Whig historian William Lecky set Tone "far above the dreary level of commonplace which Irish conspiracy in general presents". But set upon a constitutional path by Daniel O'Connell, nationalist opinion in Ireland was slow to embrace his memory. Despite the efforts of his wife Mathilda and their son William who had collected his papers in a two-volume Life of Theobald Wolfe Tone (Washington in 1826), in the decades after his death, Tone's name languished in relative obscurity.

In 1843, Thomas Davis published in The Nation his elegiac poem Tone's Grave, and with Mathilda's blessing, organised the first Bodenstown memorial. With his fellow Young Irelander (and Protestant) John Mitchel, Davis found in Tone an "alternative national hero" to O'Connell, "the Liberator", with whose solicitation of Whig government favour and Catholic clericalism they were increasingly disillusioned. In his History of Ireland (1864), Mitchel drew uncritically from the Life, beginning what historian James Quinn suggests is a "long tradition in nationalist historiography of treating Tone's writing as sacred scripture".

Mitchel's portrayal of Tone as an uncompromising martyr in the cause of independence was adopted, in turn, by a succeeding generation of "physical-force" republicans, the Irish Republican Brotherhood (IRB), the "Fenians". In 1873, their supporters began the practice of annual pilgrimages to Bodenstown. They saw it as fully in the spirit of Tone to dismiss, as a distraction from the struggle for independence, the Land League and other agrarian agitation.

In 1898, the centenary commemorations of the rebellion bore "the stamp" of O'Connell's home-rule successors. Attempts by William Butler Yeats, president in Dublin of the Wolfe Tone Memorial Association and, in Belfast, by Alice Milligan, author of her own six-penny version of Tone's Life, to celebrate his secular republicanism, were overwhelmed by accounts of 1798 confined to the risings in the south. In these, Tone and other Protestant leaders were effectively sidelined. The focus was on Wexford where, at Oulart Hill, rebels had been led to their first victory by a Catholic priest, John Murphy. Meanwhile, at Tone's graveside, Connolly claimed that his Irish Socialist Republican Party "alone" was "in line with the thought of this revolutionary apostle of the United Irishmen".

=== Twentieth century ===
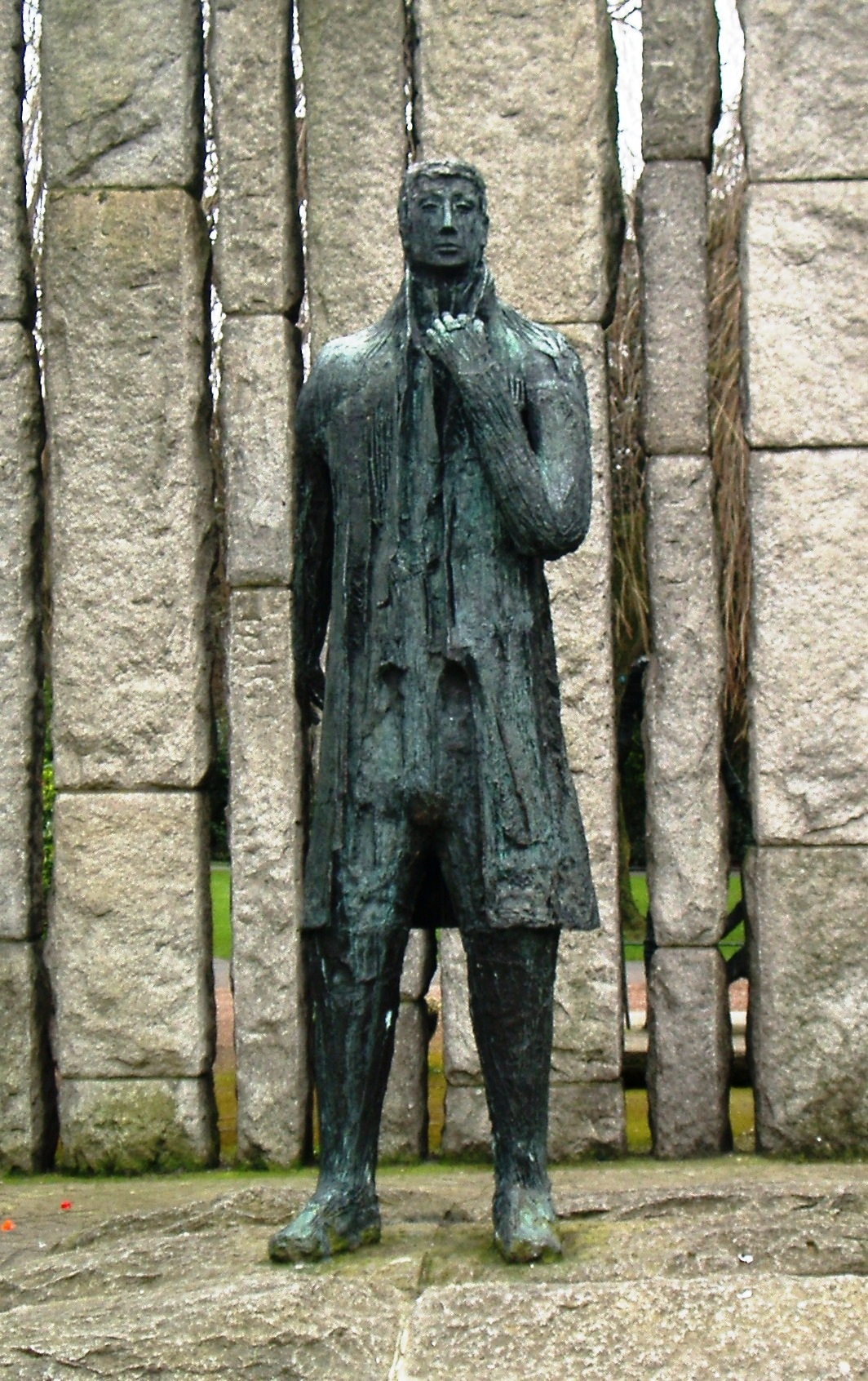
Wolfe Tone (1967) statue on St. Stephen's Green, Dublin by Edward Delaney

In 1912, the IRB veteran Tom Clarke revived the lapsed commemorations at Bodenstown. Speaking at the graveside in 1913, Patrick Pearse described the site as the "holiest place in Ireland", for "though many had testified in death to the truth of Ireland’s claim to nationhood; Wolfe Tone was the greatest of all that had made that testimony; he was the greatest of Ireland’s dead". But while Tone many have been an "apostle" for those who rallied to the republic proclaimed by Pearse, Clarke and Connolly in 1916, writers with influence in the new Irish state after 1922 dismissed him as not being Irish enough. The "Irish Irelander" D. P. Moran, described Tone as "a Frenchman born in Ireland of English parents", while in a work entitled Wolfe Tone and the United Irishmen—for or against Christ? (1937), Leo McCabe (the Jesuit, Br Denis Peter Fennell) associated the veneration of Tone with nothing less than a Judeo-Masonic-Communist conspiracy to destroy Christianity. Conversely there were those who, stressing his work as an agent of the Catholic Committee, sought to adapt Tone to the state's Catholic-inflected nationalism. Aodh de Blácam, a close Fianna Fáil partisan of Éamon de Valera, insisted that Tone's "attachment to his mother's Catholic people was with him to the end".

Anti-Treaty republicans were able to gather at the graveside only after the official, state-organised, demonstration involving martial displays by the National Army. Once De Valera's Fianna Fáil gained office in 1932, pro-Treaty Fine Gael abandoned Tone's graveside for an annual ceremony at Béal na Bláth, in County Cork, where Michael Collins met his death in an ambush in August 1922.

Tensions surrounding Tone's legacy were evident in the 1934 Bodenstown commemorations. A Republican Congress "James Connolly" contingent from the Protestant Shankill Road in Belfast (accompanied by Jack White and by Winifred Carney) was blocked on their approach to the graveside and their "red" banner—"Break the Connection with Capitalism"—torn by IRA stewards. Each side accused the other of dishonouring, and misappropriating, Tone's memory.

Arising out of the bi-centenary celebrations of Tone's birth in 1963, left-leaning elements of the IRA formed the Wolfe Tone Societies. The WTS opposed the Republic of Ireland's entry into the European Economic Community and protested the Vietnam War. A key figure in the WTS was Roy Johnston, of Protestant background, who (in the tradition of the Republican Congress) looked to recruit Protestants in Northern Ireland to the cause of national unity in a workers' republic.

Following his bi-centenary, a memorial to Tone was commissioned for St Stephen's Green in Dublin. The work by Edward Delaney was unveiled in 1967 by Éamon de Valera. Having, in the name of Tone, opposed the dominion-status Irish Free State, De Valera took the occasion to declare that, while still to achieve national unity, the Republic of Ireland of which he was now president was that for which Tone had "longed for and worked for".

In October 1969, the Ulster loyalist UVF claimed responsibility for bombing and damaging the Bodenstown memorial to "the traitor Wolfe Tone". In June 1975, the UVF sought to derail a train near Sallins carrying 250 Official IRA supporters to the annual commemoration, and murdered a witness to their attempt.

In 1998, the rebellion's bicentenary, Sinn Féin president Gerry Adams and Taoiseach, Bertie Ahern made separate appearances at Bodenstown to claim Tone's sanction for their endorsement of the "Good Friday" Belfast Agreement. Acknowledging "with pride" the roots of its republicanism in "the mainly Presbyterian United Irish movement," Adams declared Sinn Féin equal to the task Tone had set for those truly committed to a sovereign Ireland: to "cast off the manacles of religious sectarianism and 'abolish the memory of past dissensions'". Ahern offered that in that Article 1, the Agreement conceded the "central tenet" of Tone's vision and that of all those who in succeeding generations "worked for reconciliation and peace between the different traditions on this island". It states: "that it is for the people of Ireland alone, by peaceful agreement, between the two parts but without external impediment, to exercise the right of self-determination on the basis of consent, freely and concurrently given, North and South".

Two years later, Ahern used the same occasion to threaten extraordinary measures against those he described as capable of uniting Catholic, Protestant and Dissenter "only in death". Dissident republicans, who saw rather a cementing of partition, had been holding their own Bodenstown rallies. From Tone, they claimed a "continuing legacy" of struggle against "British occupation".

== Descendants ==
Of Tone's four children, three died prematurely. His eldest child, Maria Tone (1786–1803; died in Paris) and his youngest child, Francis Rawdon Tone (1793–1806) both died of tuberculosis. Another son, Richard Tone (born between 1787 and 1789) died in infancy.

Only his son William Theobald Wolfe Tone (born 1789/91) survived to adulthood. Raised in France by his mother after Tone's death, William was appointed a cadet in the Imperial School of Cavalry in 1810 on Napoleon's orders. He was a naturalised French citizen on 4 May 1812. In January 1813 he was made sub-lieutenant in the 8th Regiment of Chasseurs and joined the Grand Army in Germany. His nom de guerre was the punning le petit loup – the little wolf. He was at the battles of Löwenberg, Goldberg, Dresden, Bauthen, Mühlberg, and Aachen. Following the Battle of Leipzig, in which he received lance wounds, he was promoted to lieutenant and was decorated with the Legion of Honour.

After the defeat of Napoleon at the Battle of Waterloo, William emigrated to New York, where he studied law with the United Irish veteran and abolitionist, William Sampson. He married Sampson's daughter and in 1819 he won a commission as captain in the United States Army. He died on 11 October 1828 at the age of 37, survived by his only child, his daughter Grace Georgina.

Matilda Tone also returned to the United States, where in 1816 she married Thomas Wilson, a Scottish businessman and advocate who had taken care of Tone's financial affairs after the death of her husband. Her efforts, with Wilson, to return to Ireland were twice rebuffed by the British authorities. She died in 1849, and is buried in Greenwood Cemetery in Brooklyn, New York.

== In popular culture ==
Several Gaelic Athletic Association clubs in Ireland are named in honour of Wolfe Tone. These include, in Kildare, Wolfe Tones GAA; in Armagh, Wolfe Tone GAC, Derrymacash; in Derry, Bellaghy Wolfe Tones GAC; in Meath, Wolfe Tones GAA, and in Tyrone, Drumquin Wolfe Tones GAC and Kildress Wolfe Tones GAC. In North America, there is the Chicago Wolfe Tones GFC in Illinois, and the Edmonton Wolfe Tones in Alberta, Canada. In Antrim, the Greencastle Wolfe Tones GAC is based in the Greencastle district of North Belfast, bordering Cavehill where members of the United Irishmen took their oaths.

In 1963, Brian Warfield, Noel Nagle, Tommy Byrne, and Derek Warfield formed The Wolfe Tones, an Irish republican band. They play Irish rebel music and have courted some controversy with songs celebrating the Provisional IRA.

In 1998, Tone, played by the actor Adrian Dunbar, was the protagonist in an RTÉ four-part television movie, The Officer From France.

The bicentennial year also saw publication of Belmont Castle: or, Suffering Sensibility "by Theobald Wolfe Tone & divers hands". Edited by Marion Deane, it is an epistolary novel that Tone wrote with two friends, John Radcliff and Richard Jebb, in 1790, manuscripts of which were found in his possession when he was arrested in 1798. It is described as "an elaborate roman à clef, satirizing the lives of several prominent figures of the Anglo-Irish establishment and redressing a painful love affair [with Lady Elizabeth Vesey] from Tone's past".

== Works ==
- Belmont Castle: or, Suffering Sensibility, a novel with John Radcliff, Richard Jebb, 1790
- The Spanish War, 1790
- An Argument on Behalf of the Catholics of Ireland, 1791
- Declaration of the United Irishmen, 1791
- The Autobiography of Theobald Wolfe Tone, 1798
- On Being Found Guilty, 1798
- The Life of Wolfe Tone, Written by himself, with his Political Writings and Fragments from his Diary, William T. W. Tone ed., 1826
- The Writings of Theobald Wolfe Tone 1763–98, T. W. Moody, R.B. McDowell and C. J. Woods eds., 1998
- Works by Wolfe Tone at Open Library
