= Headfort =

Headfort may refer to:

- Marquess of Headfort, a title in the Irish peerage
- Headfort (house) (sometimes called 'Headfort House'), a stately home and former boarding school in County Meath, Ireland
