= Equestrian statue of George I, Birmingham =

Bronze statue in Birmingham, England

Equestrian statue of George I
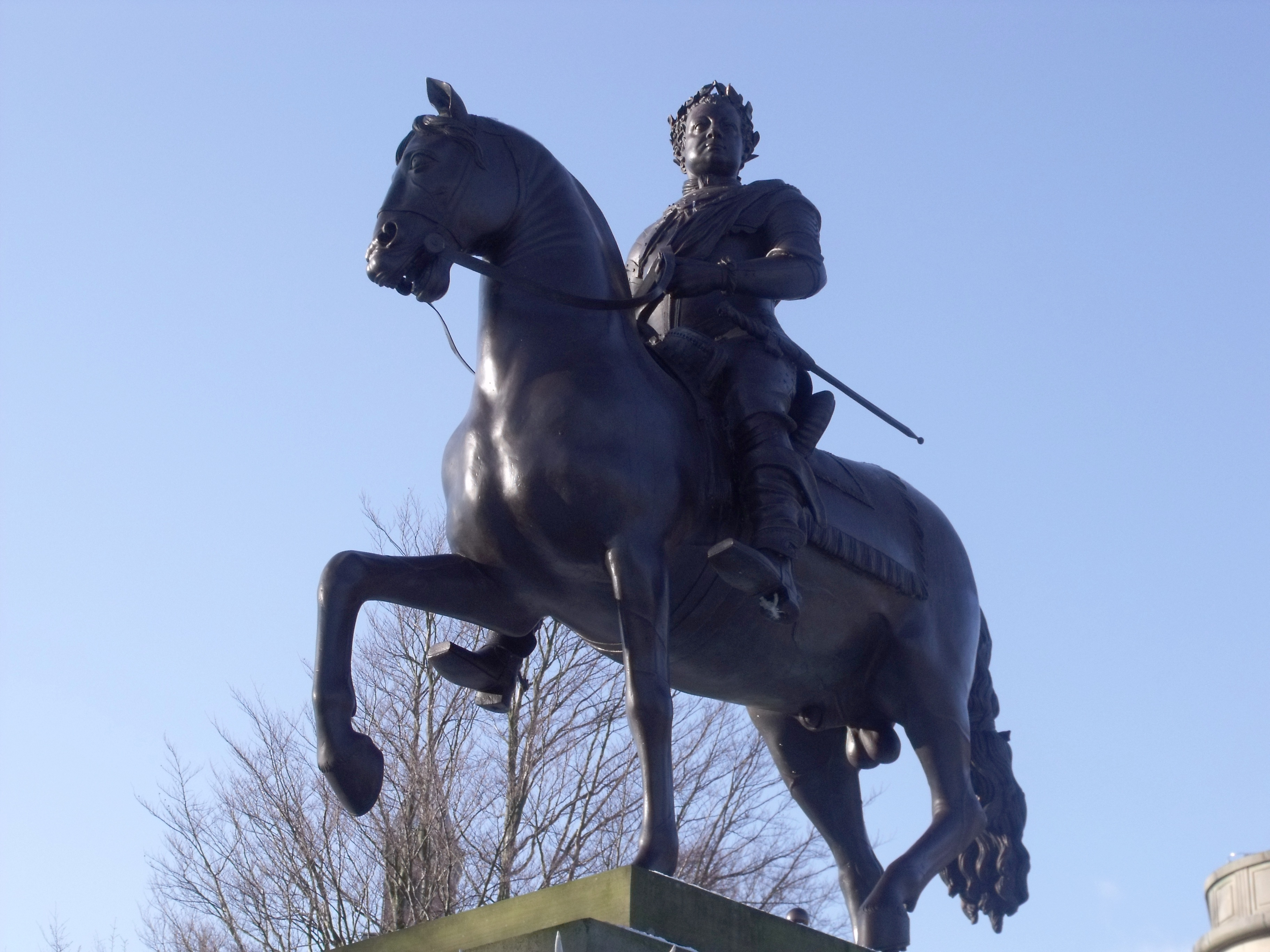

- Location within West Midlands county
- Artist: John Nost
- Medium: bronze
- Designation: Grade II listed building
- Location: Barber Institute of Fine Arts, Birmingham, United Kingdom; 52°27′00″N 1°55′38″W

The Equestrian statue of George I, by John van Nost the Elder, is a statue that stands outside the Barber Institute of Fine Arts in Birmingham, England.

== History ==
The bronze statue was commissioned by the city of Dublin in 1717, as a gesture of loyalty towards George I (who had been King of Great Britain and Ireland since August 1714), in the face of support from Irish Catholics for the pretender to his throne, James Stuart.

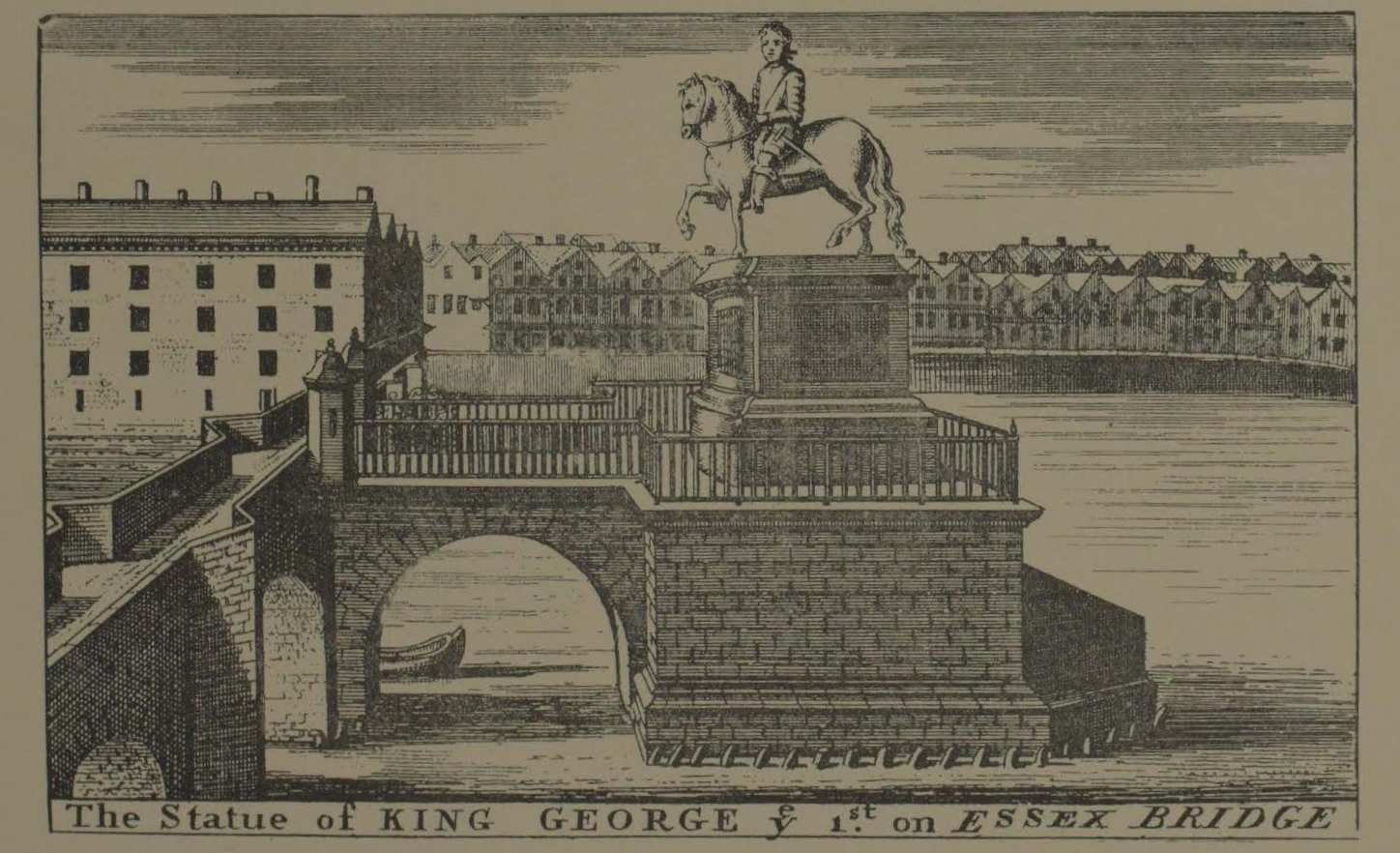
Statue of George I on a plinth off Essex Bridge, Dublin where it stood from 1722-53 as seen in Charles Brooking's map of Dublin (1728).

George is shown wearing contemporary clothing, but with a laurel wreath in the Roman style. The work may have been finished by van Nost's students.

It was displayed on Essex Bridge (now Grattan Bridge) in Dublin from 1722 until some time between 1753 and 1755 when it was removed by George Semple, who was in charge of rebuilding the bridge, in order to prevent erosion caused by the flow of water around the pedestal on which the statue sat.

The statue was re-erected in 1798 in the gardens of the city's Mansion House. It was acquired for the Barber Institute, Birmingham in 1937 (at which time Dublin was the capital of the Irish Free State) by the institute's founding director, Thomas Bodkin, who had arrived there directly from his post as director of the National Gallery of Ireland in 1935.

In July 1982, the statue was granted legal protection as a Grade II listed structure, preventing unauthorised removal or alteration.
