= O'Donovan Rossa Bridge =

Bridge over the River Liffey in Ireland

O'Donovan Rossa Bridge Droichead Uí Dhonnabháin Rosa
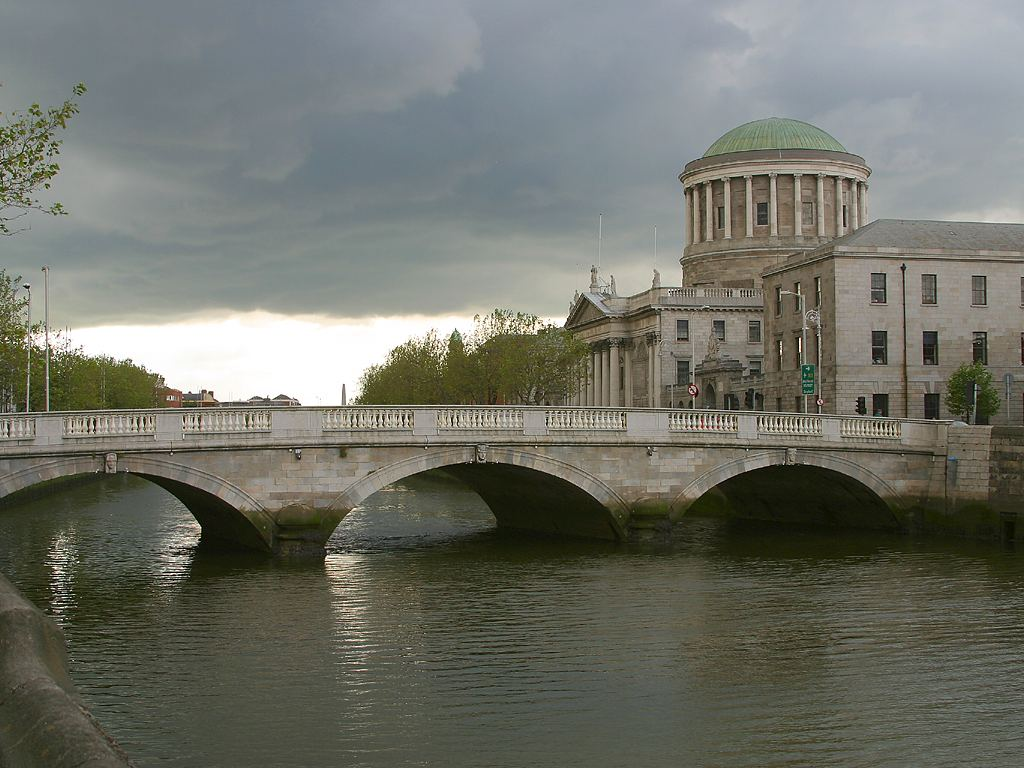
- O'Donovan Rossa Bridge and the Four Courts
- Coordinates: 53.3453°N 6.2722°W
- Crosses: River Liffey
- Locale: Dublin, Ireland
- Other name(s): Ormonde Bridge, Richmond Bridge
- Named for: Jeremiah O'Donovan Rossa
- Preceded by: Father Mathew Bridge
- Followed by: Grattan Bridge

Characteristics
- Material: Granite masonry
- Total length: 44m
- Width: 15m
- No. of spans: 3

History
- Designer: George Knowles
- Opened: New Bridge (First built 1682); Ormond Bridge (Rebuilt 1684); Richmond Bridge (New location 1816); O'Donovan Rossa Bridge (Renamed 1923)

Location
- Interactive map of O'Donovan Rossa Bridge

O'Donovan Rossa Bridge (Irish: Droichead Uí Dhonnabháin Rosa), previously known as Richmond Bridge, is a road bridge spanning the River Liffey in Dublin, Ireland, which joins Winetavern Street to Chancery Place (at the Four Courts) and the north quays.

== History ==
=== 1684 bridge ===
Replacing a short-lived wooden structure, the original masonry bridge on this site was built in 1684 as a five-span simple arch bridge, and named 'Ormond (or Ormonde) Bridge' after James Butler, 1st Duke of Ormond. The construction was overseen by William Robinson.

Between 1752 and 1761, George Semple and his brother John Semple I were consulted on the design and maintenance of the bridge and the possible construction of a new bridge.

In December 1802, this bridge was swept away during a severe storm which also damaged Ringsend Bridge and Lucan Bridge.

=== Richmond Bridge (1813) ===
In 1813, construction started on a replacement bridge, the current structure, a little further west to the designs of James Savage and was opened in 1816. It consists of three elliptical arch spans in granite, with sculptured heads, similar to those on O'Connell Bridge, on the keystones. The heads represent Plenty, the Liffey, and Industry on one side, with Commerce, Hibernia and Peace on the other. The balustrades are of cast iron.

Opened as Richmond Bridge (named for Charles Lennox, 4th Duke of Richmond, Lord Lieutenant of Ireland), it was renamed in 1923 for Jeremiah O'Donovan Rossa by the fledgling Free State.
