= Ringsend Bridge =

Bridge over the River Dodder in Ireland

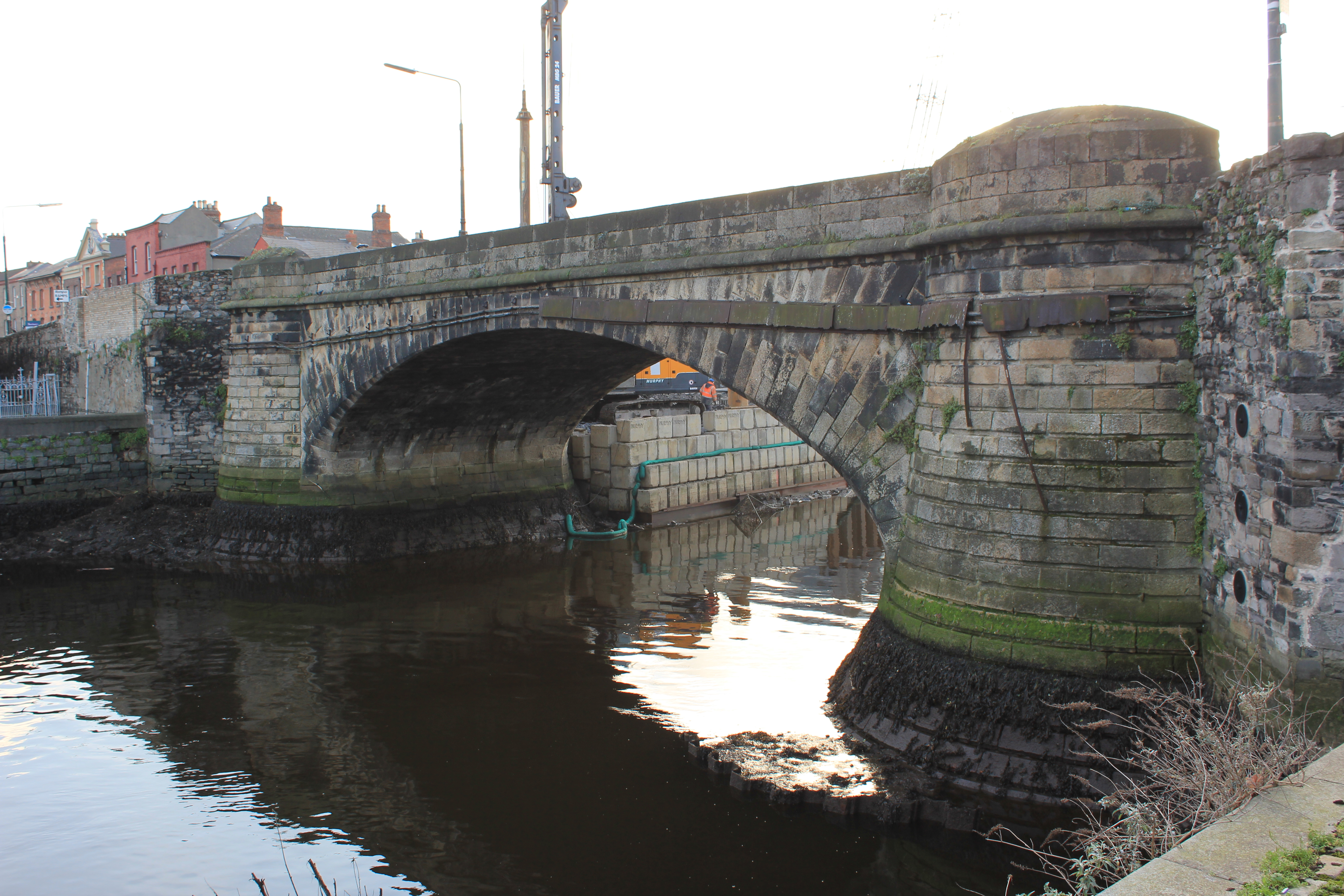
- Ringsend Bridge from the west side of the Dodder looking southeast
- Coordinates: 53.341724°N 6.228857°W
- Crosses: River Dodder
- Other name(s): Charlotte Bridge
- Maintained by: Dublin City Council
- Preceded by: 1st Ringsend Bridge (1650 - 1739); 2nd Ringsend Bridge (1739 - 1782); 3rd Ringsend Bridge (1786 - 1787 - incomplete); 4th Ringsend Bridge (1789 - 1802)

Characteristics
- Material: Wicklow granite
- Total length: ~23.77m
- Width: ~8.22m
- No. of spans: 1

History
- Construction start: 1803
- Construction end: 1812

Ringsend Bridge is a bridge over the River Dodder in Dublin, Ireland. The current bridge was opened in 1812 after the previous structure was destroyed in a flood in 1802. The bridge is part of the R802 regional road and is part of Bridge Street.

== History ==
In 1623 Richard Morgan first petitioned Dublin Corporation to build a bridge but this was declined.

A bridge was built in 1650 and this lasted until 1739 when it was washed away in a flood, as mentioned in the Pembroke Estate Papers.

The new bridge lasted only until 1782 when another flood destroyed the structure.

=== 1786 bridge ===
A replacement bridge was begun in 1786 but was destroyed by yet another flood the following year. An illustration by John James Barralet from 1787 shows people clambering over makeshift planks attached to the collapsed bridge.

=== 1789 bridge ===
A fourth bridge was built from 1787-89 after a competition was held but this succumbed to a flood in December 1802 when over 3 inches of rain fell in 24 hours. Prior to its destruction, it was described as being of "very solid and judicious construction" with a Mr. Black being noted as the contractor. The same storm also destroyed Ormonde Bridge and Lucan Bridge on the nearby River Liffey.

=== Modern bridge ===
The current structure was begun in 1803 and finally completed in 1812. It appears to have been both designed and built by Dublin Corporation.

It is a single arch of elliptical shape. The bridge notably has spandrel walls constructed as extensions of the voussoirs and features cornes de vache in the French style.

The bridge was originally named Charlotte Bridge for Princess Charlottle, daughter of the Prince Regent, later George IV.
