= Geoffrey de Morton =

Mayor of Dublin, Ireland

Geoffrey de Morton (died c. 1317) was a wealthy merchant and shipowner in early fourteenth-century Dublin who served as Mayor of Dublin in 1303.

He acquired a bad reputation for unscrupulous business methods and corruption: in particular, he was responsible for the murage scandal of 1308 to 1313, in which he misappropriated crucial public funds intended for the defence of the Dublin city walls.

== Early career ==
According to Elrington Ball, Geoffrey de Morton came from a prominent Anglo-Norman family which had settled in Dublin, though little seems to be known of them. He made his fortune by trading with England, Scotland and France, in wine among other commodities. Presumably his wealth was the main reason he was chosen as Mayor of Dublin. He was plunged into controversy almost immediately after his election when he was accused of stealing the official seal of Dublin Corporation for his own private use. Geoffrey insisted that it was not he but his wife Maud who had stolen the seal, and the Corporation seems to have accepted this rather implausible explanation, although what motive his wife might have had for the theft of the seal was unclear.

In 1305 he brought a series of lawsuits against Richard de Beresford, the Lord Treasurer of Ireland, and the Barons of the Court of Exchequer (Ireland), all of which failed. The Barons brought a series of successful counter-claims, and as a result, Geoffrey was briefly imprisoned. In fairness to Geoffrey, Beresford's conduct may also have been questionable as he was himself imprisoned and removed from office, although his career was not damaged in the long term.

In the same year, Geoffrey petitioned the Crown for compensation for the loss of a cargo of wine which he had shipped to Scotland: he claimed that the Crown was liable for the loss as he had sent the shipment at the request of the Justiciar of Ireland, acting on behalf of King Edward I. Despite Geoffrey's dubious reputation for commercial honesty this claim may have been genuine: at any rate, it was not rejected outright but referred back to the authorities in Dublin for further discussion.

In 1299 he and his wife brought a successful lawsuit against her former bailiff, William Haleghdon, who was ordered to account for his profits.

== The murage scandal ==
Geoffrey was apparently undeterred by his imprisonment, or the failure of his lawsuits, and in 1308 he applied to King Edward II for a licence to levy a toll for six years to pay for the murage. The murage was the tax imposed every year since 1221 for the upkeep of the Dublin city walls, and part of it was earmarked for the repair of Isolde's Tower, the defensive tower situated at one end of Old Dublin Bridge (now Father Mathew Bridge), on present-day Essex Quay which had been damaged by fire. Geoffrey claimed to have employed stone masons to repair it, and that he himself had spent more than £80 on the work. He neglected to mention that as he himself was the tenant of Isolde's tower, he was legally obliged to keep it in good repair at his own expense. The licence was granted and confirmed by an Act of the Irish Parliament, but the grant led to a flood of complaints about Geoffrey's corrupt management of the tolls, and in particular his practice of exempting his own friends from paying them. In addition, it appears that none of the money was spent on the upkeep of the walls, which might have had disastrous consequences for the Dubliners during the Scots Invasion of 1315-18. Geoffrey also built several houses on the bridge, which it was alleged seriously disrupted the flow of traffic.

In 1309 Richard le Blond, the King's Serjeant, made the first official complaint concerning Geoffrey's maladministration. The case was heard by Piers Gaveston, the Lord Lieutenant of Ireland: the inquiry appears to have ended inconclusively.

== Disgrace ==
By 1311 the complaints about Geoffrey's misgovernment had become so vociferous that the King ordered a full inquiry, which upheld all the complaints of fraud and neglect of official duty against him. John Wogan, the Justiciar of Ireland, was ordered to revoke Geoffrey's licence for the murage and to audit his accounts. In 1312 the King reprimanded Wogan for failing to carry out his orders. Finally, in 1313 Geoffrey admitted defeat and submitted to the "grace and mercy" of the Mayor of Dublin. He promised to make amends for his trespasses, and gave a bond on behalf of himself and his family in the sum of 500 silver marks, as a pledge that he would not trouble the city any further. He did not, however, demolish the houses on Dublin Bridge: in 1317, shortly after his death, his widow, daughter and son-in-law came to an agreement with the Corporation concerning them. His son-in-law John de Grauntsete rebuilt Isolde's Tower and added another tower at the other end of the bridge, and later endowed a chapel on the bridge. John and his wife Alice were allowed to retain some of the money improperly acquired by his father-in-law, apparently after the intervention of Robert de Nottingham, the Mayor of Dublin, who had married Alice's half-sister Loretta.

== Family ==
Geoffrey married, before 1299, Maud (or Matilda) de Bree, widow of Robert de Bree, another wealthy merchant of Dublin. There is a report from 1299 of a lawsuit they brought in the Court of Common Pleas (Ireland) before the Chief Justice (Simon de Ludgate) and his colleagues against William Haleghton, Matilda's former bailiff. The verdict was that William must give an account of his profits.

They had two daughters: Maud, and Alice who married the High Court judge John de Grauntsete. Alice died c. 1335.
