= John de Grauntsete =

English-born Irish judge (c.1270–c.1350)

John de Grauntsete or Grantsete (or John of Grantchester) (c. 1270 – c. 1350) was an English judge who lived in fourteenth-century Ireland. We know more about him than we do about any other contemporary Irish judge, and from the surviving information we can form some idea of the lifestyle of an Irish judge in his time. He sat in turn in each of the Irish Courts of common law, and uniquely he is known to have appeared in Court as an advocate even after he became a judge.

== Early career ==
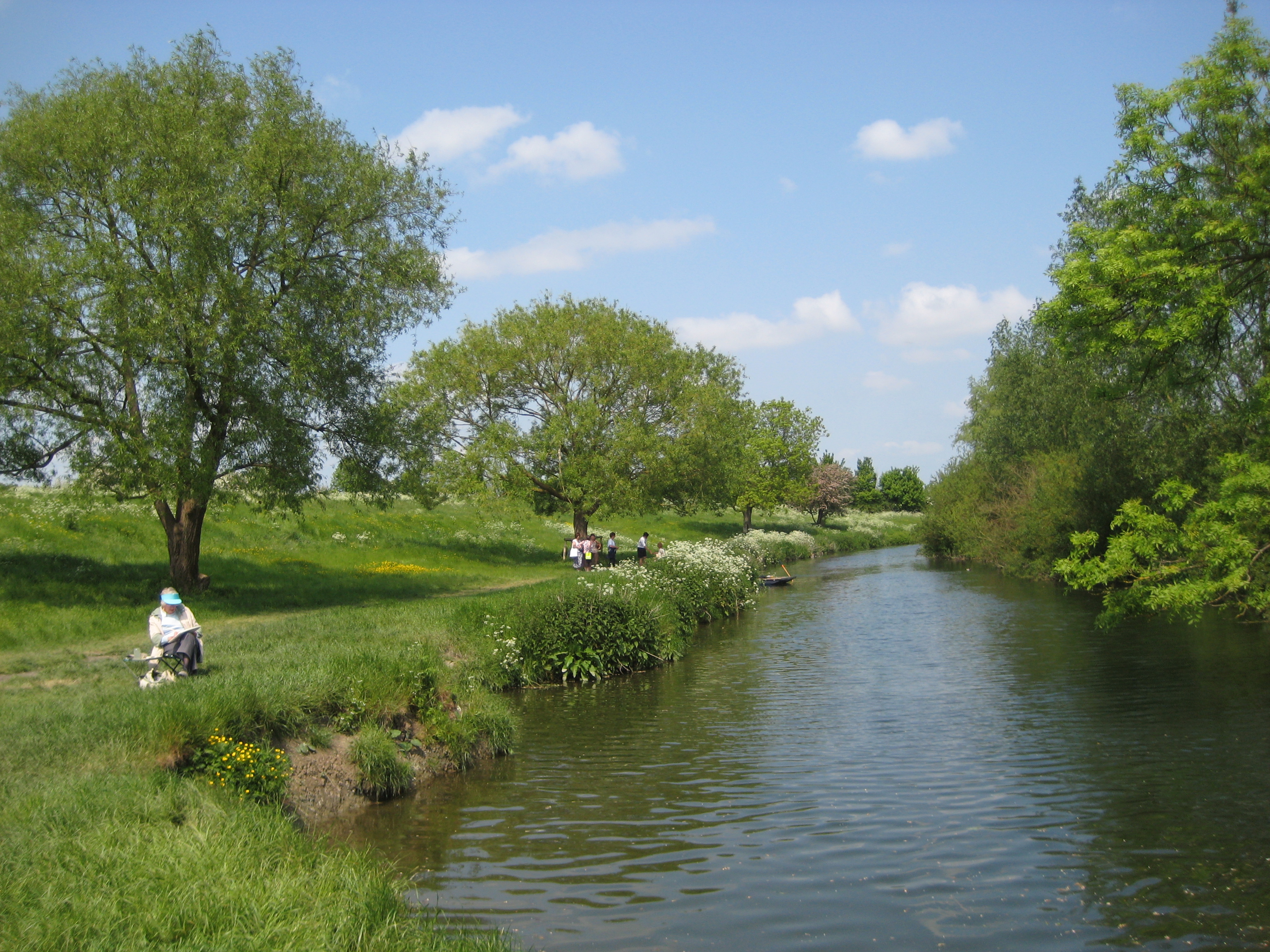
Grantchester, present-day - view of the River Cam

He was the son of Ralph de Grauntsete, who acted as steward to Aymer de Valence, 2nd Earl of Pembroke. His father was a native of Grantchester in Cambridgeshire: his surname is an early form of the town's name (which appears as Grantesete and Grauntsethe in Domesday Book). John, though he spent much of his life in Ireland, always retained close links with Grantchester. He seems to have been in practice as a lawyer by 1300 and in 1302 was nominated by the Bishop of Ely to be his attorney.

He came to Dublin in about 1308: his father lived in Ireland for some years, managing the Earl of Pembroke's Irish estates, and it is possible that John was born in Ireland. He married Alice de Morton, daughter and co-heiress of Geoffrey de Morton, who was Lord Mayor of Dublin and one of the city's wealthiest shipowners and his wife Matilda or Maud de Bree, widow of Robert de Bree. John & Alice had had at least one son, John, commonly known as John of Granchester. The younger John was an adult by 1342.

He acquired an impressive house abutting the city wall, close to old Dublin Bridge, now Father Mathew Bridge; he later completed two small towers, one at each end of the bridge, and began the building of a chapel there. He also owned property in Castle Street in Dublin city centre, and at Oxmantown to the north of Dublin city. His property by the bridge included the Dublin "fish-house", for the upkeep of which he was responsible. He was given a special licence to pierce the city wall, in order to provide his house with sufficient light.

In 1317 he, his wife and her mother compounded with Dublin Corporation for the numerous fines owed by his late father-in-law, who was notorious for corruption, especially in regard to his grossly dishonest mismanagement of the collection of the murage i.e.the toll for the upkeep of the city walls. Geoffrey had also illegally built his house on the bridge, to the great inconvenience of the citizens.

John continued to practice law and was acting as legal adviser to the Harold family, who were tenants of Rathfarnham Castle, in 1320. In 1318 he was exempted from acting as mayor, Sheriff, bailiff or coroner. In 1326 he was made second Baron of the Court of Exchequer (Ireland) and in the following year, he was transferred to the Court of Common Pleas (Ireland), with a salary of £40 a year. In 1327 he was awarded custody of the Dublin lands of Sir William Comyn deceased, during the minority of Comyn's heir. In the same year he belatedly petitioned for compensation for the devastation of his lands during the Bruce Campaign in Ireland ten years earlier.

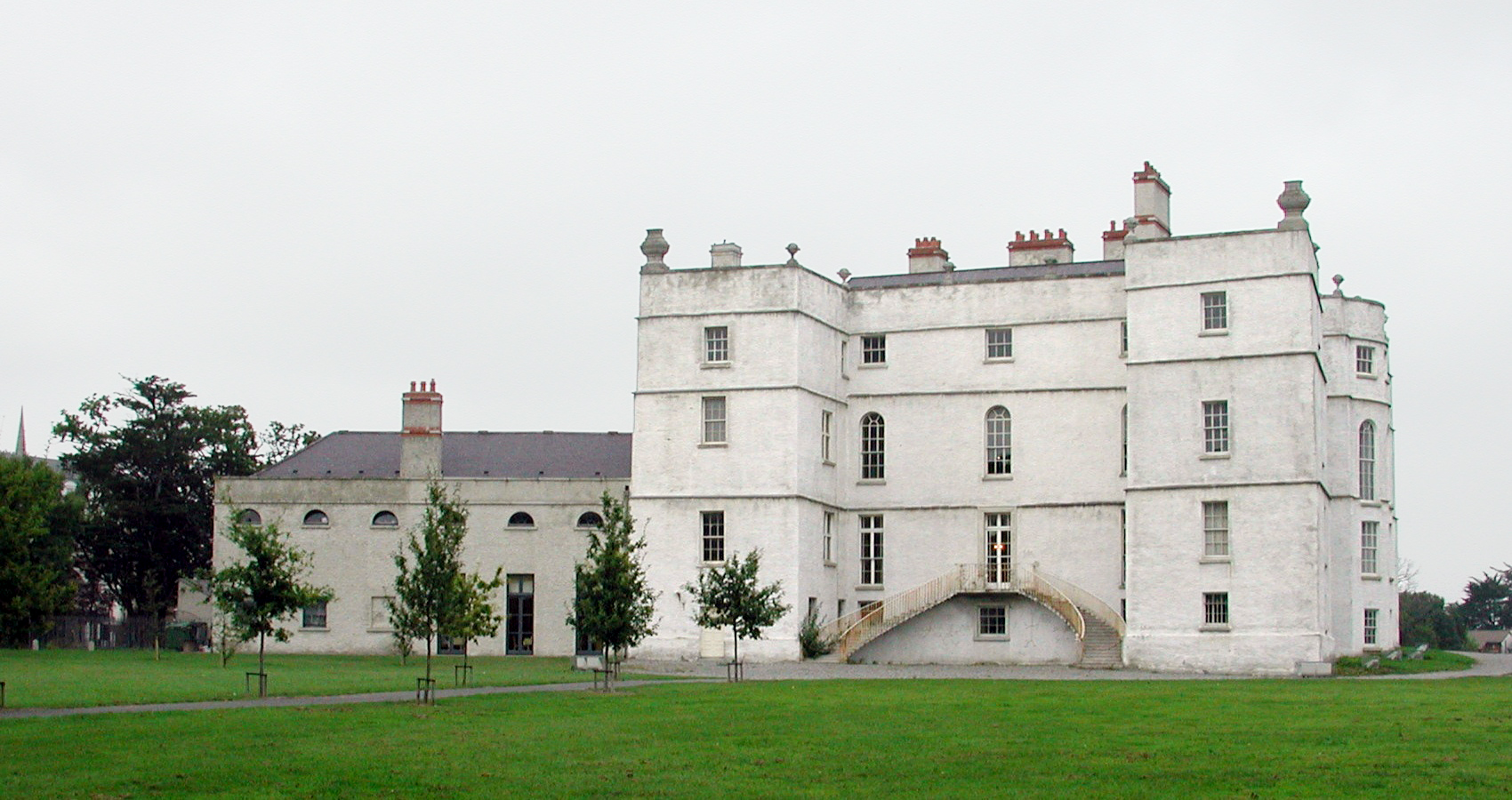
Rathfarnham Castle, present day

== Judge and advocate ==
His career suffered a serious reverse, due to a curious episode in 1329 when the former Chief Baron of the Irish Exchequer, Walter de Islip, was engaged in litigation in the Justiciar's Court with one William de London over possession of certain lands. Grauntsete appeared as advocate for de London: his conduct in appearing as an advocate after his appointment to the Bench has been described as "startling", and is apparently unique in the history of the common law. His conduct is the more improper since it appears that he himself was the tenant of the land in question. He then proceeded to offend the Justiciar by reading out letters of excommunication from the Papal Court directed to Walter de Islip, despite the Justiciar's order to him to desist, and further angered the Court by having a notary make a transcript of the proceedings. He was charged with attempting to subvert the Royal authority in favour of that of the Pope, deprived of office, imprisoned and heavily fined. King Edward III however soon granted him a royal pardon: he was restored to office, and shortly afterwards transferred to a more senior position, and in 1331 obtained an annulment of the judgment against him.

== Later career ==
Edward III clearly thought well of him, and invited him to England in 1332 to discuss Irish affairs. In December 1329, significantly after the excommunication controversy, he was transferred to the Court of King's Bench (Ireland). At about the same time he became custodian of Leixlip Castle, with the right of possession of the manor and its fishery. Technically for a serving judge to acquire property was an offence, for which John obtained another royal pardon. He complained to the Crown that these lands had been so ravaged during "the coming of the Scots" (the Bruce Invasion of 1315-18) that he was unable to work them profitably. Perhaps for this reason he was forgiven a substantial debt of £34 owing to the Exchequer of Ireland. He was also appointed Seneschal of Newcastle Lyons in south County Dublin in 1327, on his own petition "with the same fee payable as in time past". In 1334 he petitioned the English Chancery to execute a recognisance (a conditional pledge to pay money) entered into in his favour by John FitzReginald.

== Last years ==
He was a noted benefactor of the Augustinian cathedral priory of Holy Trinity, Dublin, now Christ Church Cathedral, Dublin. After his wife's death in about 1335 Roger Guion, the Prior of Holy Trinity, ordained that two canons of the Priory would pray for his health, and one after his death would pray for the souls of himself and his wife. In return John presented the Priory with a gold ring and a "precious stone on a silver chain". Grauntsete obtained a licence to erect a chapel in St. Michan's Church, and also to build St. Mary's Chapel on Dublin Bridge itself.

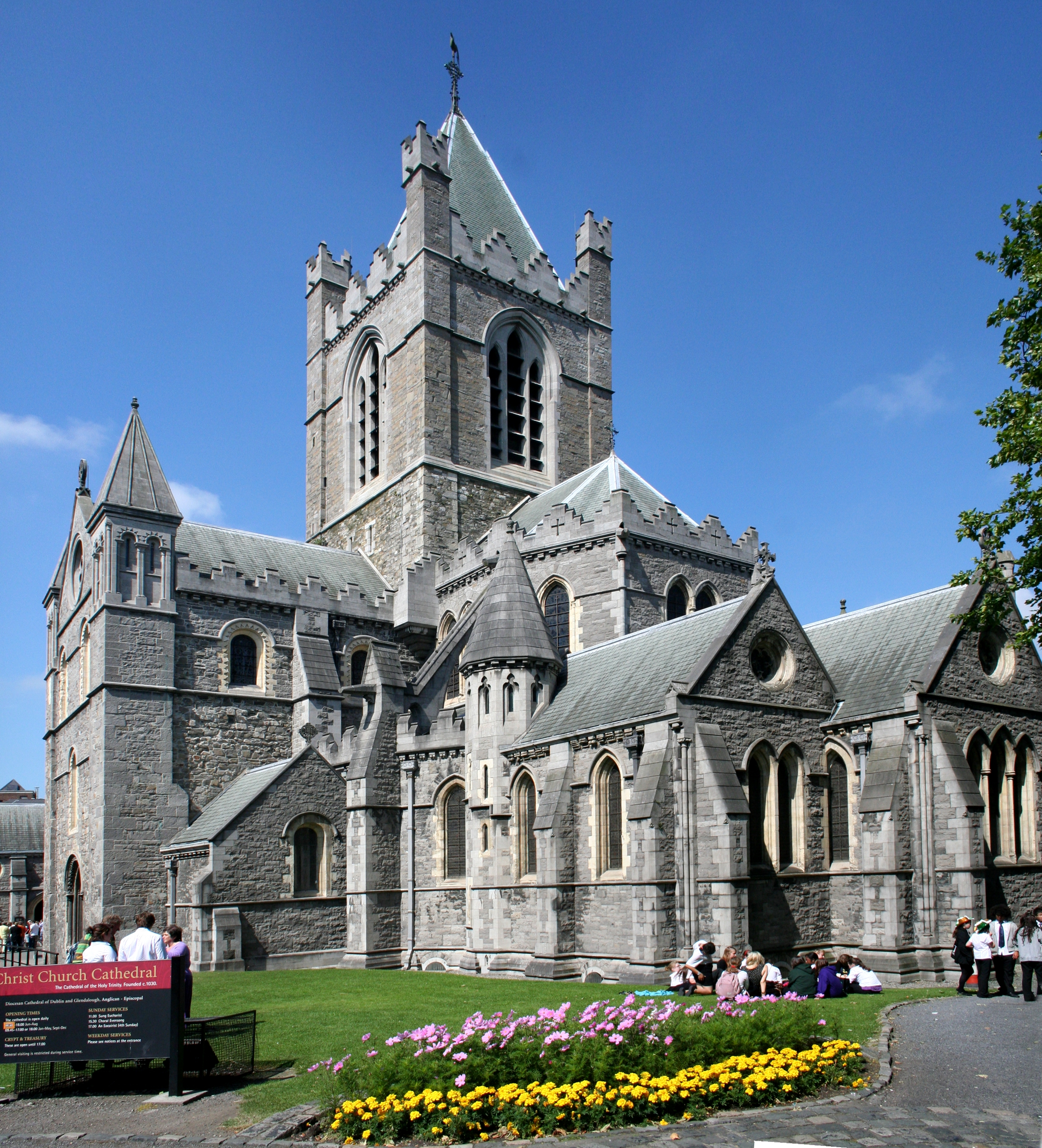
Christchurch Cathedral, Dublin

He was also a benefactor of the Order of the Hospitallers at Kilmainham Priory, and it was at Kilmainham that he spent his later years. In return for his benefactions to the Priory, he was given a large suite of servants to attend to his needs, three horses and the right to dine at the Prior's table. Although some sources put his death in 1335, (which was probably the year his wife died), he was certainly still alive in November 1348, when he was visiting England. This visit was probably in connection with the licence to build the chapel of St Mary's on the Bridge, which had been granted to him the previous month.
