= R109 road (Ireland) =

Regional road in Ireland

R109 road
- Bóthar R109
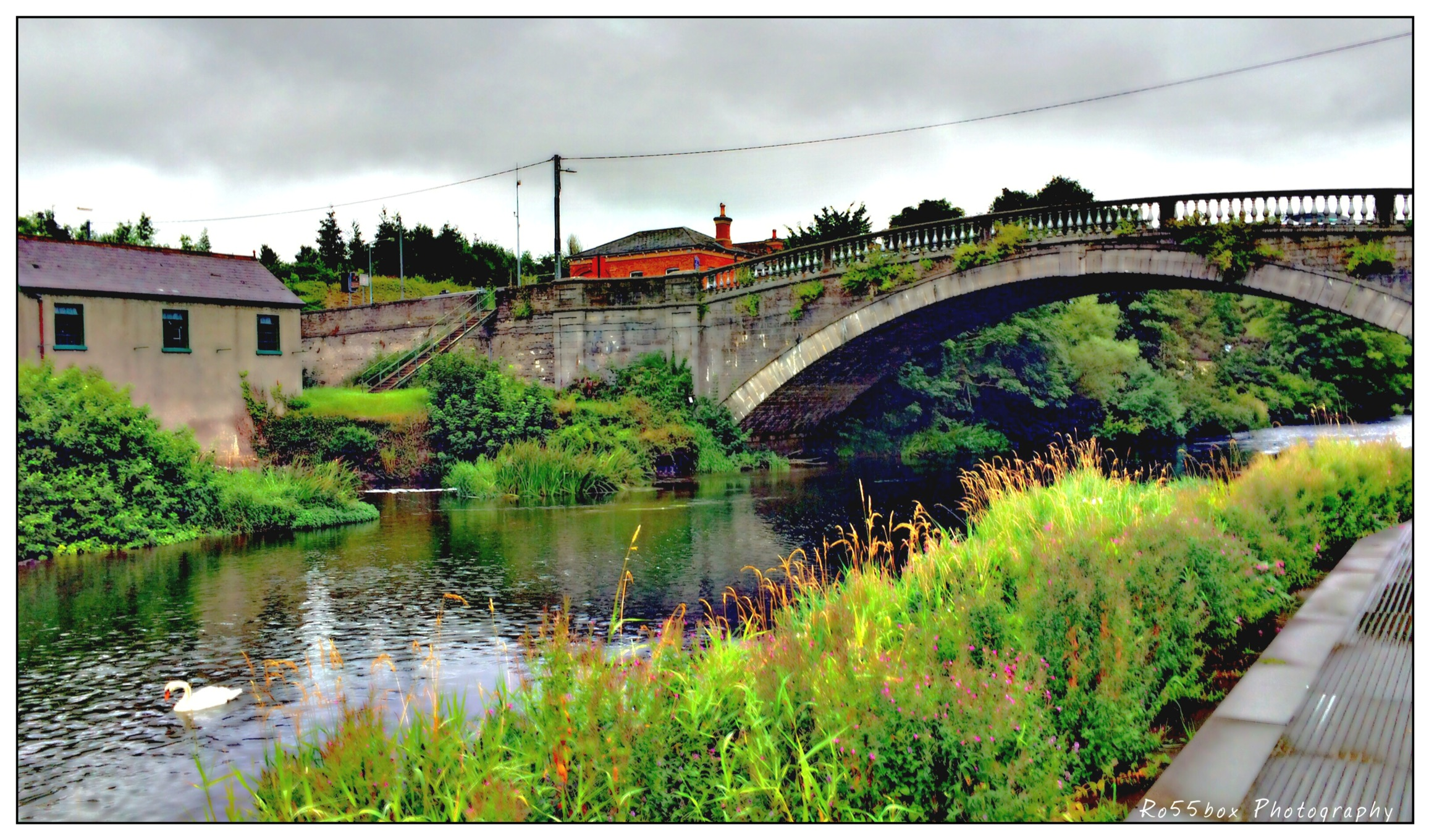
- The R109 crosses the River Liffey over Lucan Bridge, the longest stone arch span in Ireland

Route information
- Length: 12.70 km (7.89 mi)

Location
- Country: Ireland

Highway system
- Roads in Ireland; Motorways; Primary; Secondary; Regional

The R109 road is a regional road in west Dublin, Ireland. It runs from Kylemore Road via Chapelizod, the Phoenix Park and the western edge of the city centre.

The official description of the R109 from the Roads Act 1993 (Classification of Regional Roads) Order 2012 reads:

R109: Chapelizod - Wolfe Tone Quay, Dublin

Between its junction with R112 at Kylemore Road and its junction with R148 at Frank Sherwin Bridge via Lucan Road, Anna Livia Bridge Chapelizod, Conyngham Road, Parkgate Street and Wolf Tone Quay all in the city of Dublin.

== See also ==
- Roads in Ireland
- National primary road
- National secondary road
- Regional road
