= Father Mathew Bridge =

Bridge over the River Liffey in Dublin, Ireland

Father Mathew Bridge Droichead an Athar Maitiú
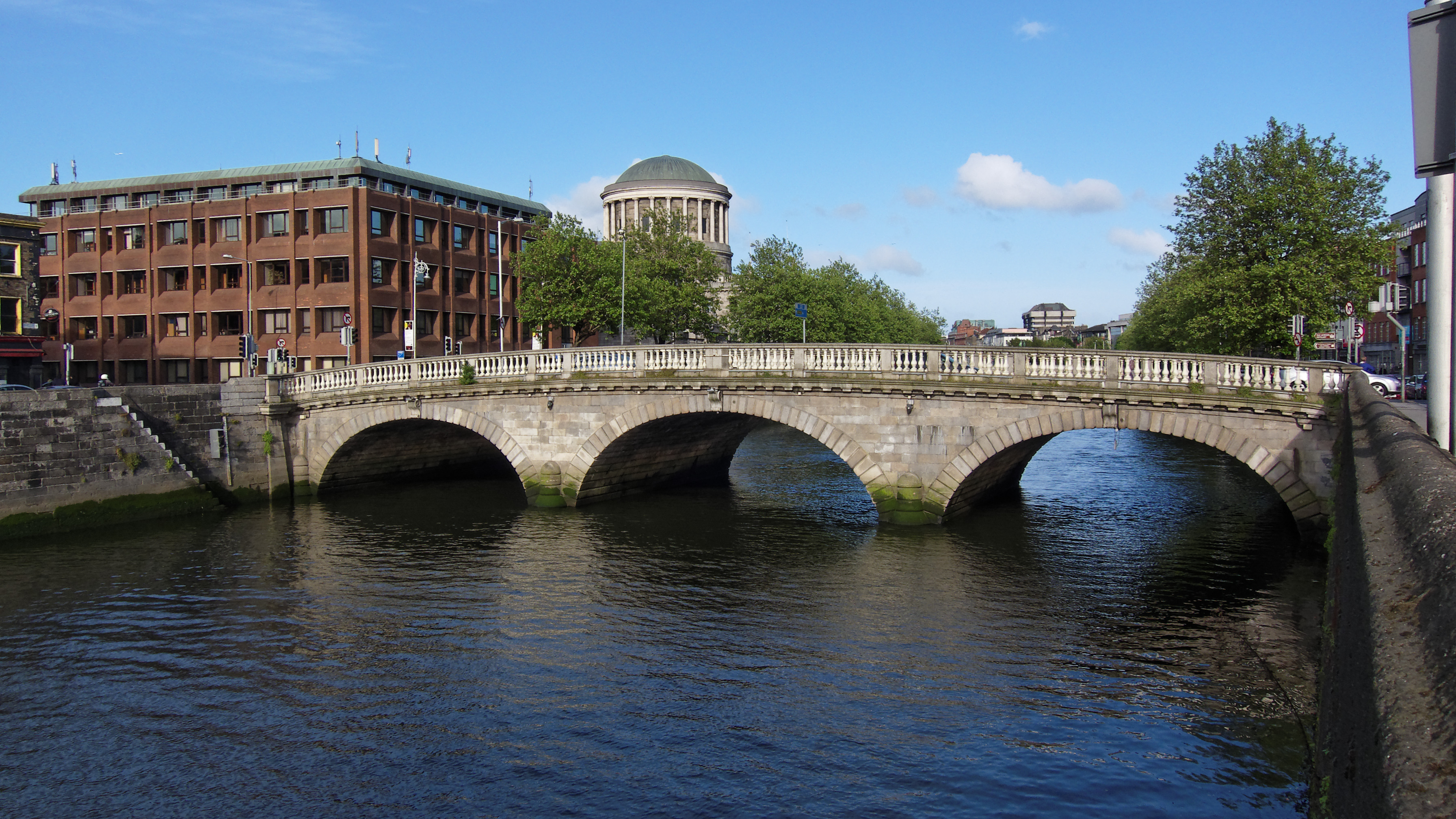
- Father Mathew Bridge (formerly known as Whitworth Bridge)
- Coordinates: 53.3455°N 6.2757°W
- Crosses: River Liffey
- Locale: Dublin, Ireland
- Preceded by: Mellows Bridge
- Followed by: O'Donovan Rossa Bridge

Characteristics
- Design: Elliptical arch stone bridge
- Material: Granite
- Total length: ~45m
- Width: ~15m
- No. of spans: 3

History
- Designer: George Knowles
- Construction end: 1816
- Construction cost: "about IR£26,000"
- Replaces: Droichet Dubhgaill (11th century?); Bridge of Dublin (13th century); Rebuilt Dublin Bridge (1428)

Location
- Interactive map of Father Mathew Bridge

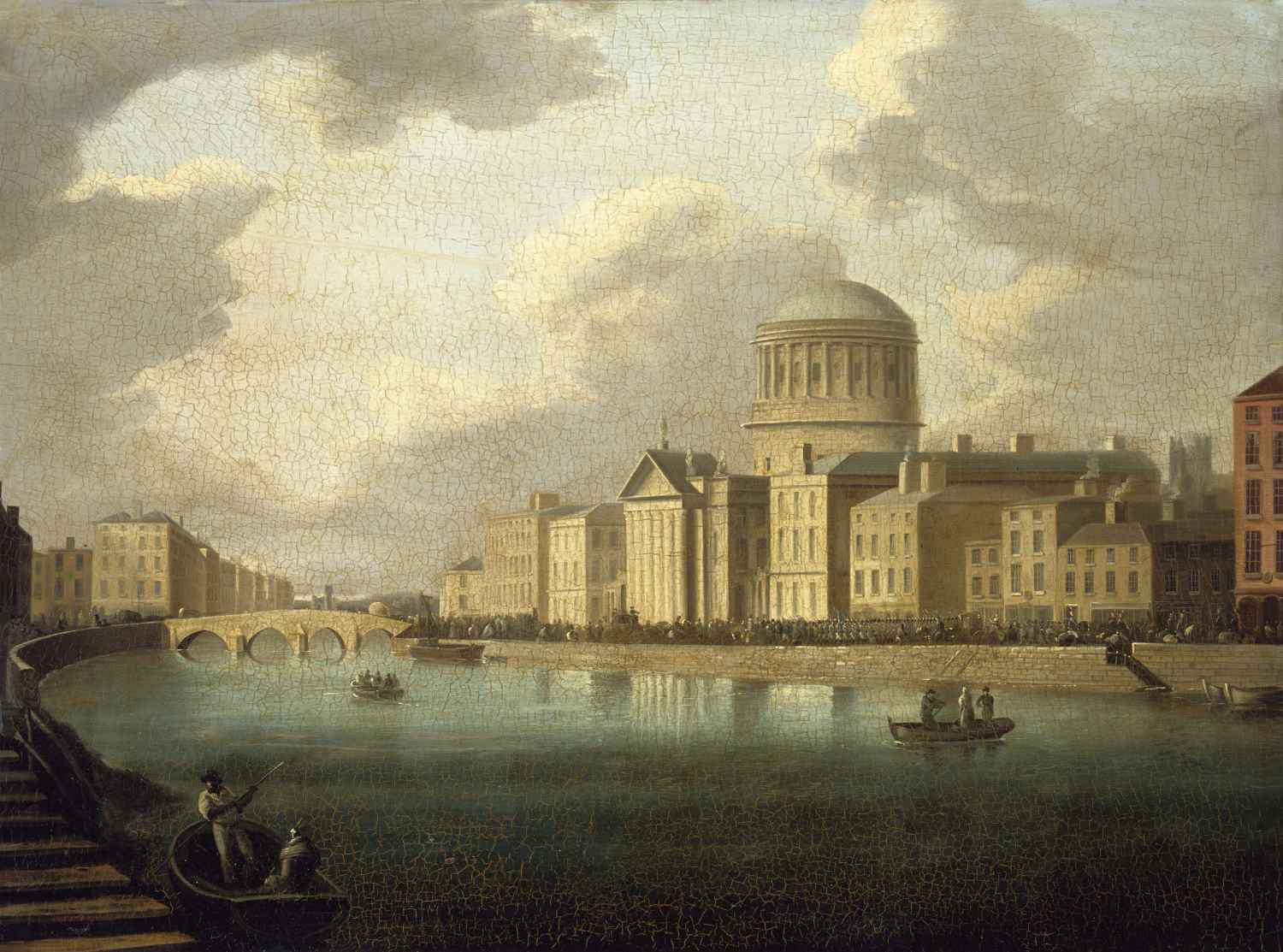
A 19th-century view of the Four Courts by William Sadler, showing the 15th-century Bridge of Dublin shortly before it was pulled down

Father Mathew Bridge (Irish: Droichead an Athar Maitiú) is a road bridge spanning the River Liffey in Dublin, Ireland, which joins Merchants Quay to Church Street and the north quays. It occupies the approximate site of the original and for many years the only Bridge of Dublin, dating back to the 11th century.

== History ==
The site of the bridge is understood to be close to the ancient "Ford of the Hurdles", which was the original crossing point on the Liffey and gives its name (in Irish) to the city of Dublin (Irish: Baile Átha Cliath, meaning 'Town of the Hurdled Ford').

According to Hamilton and Phillips, "it has been suggested that the original ford was in use up to and including the tenth century and was replaced by Dublin's first bridge, which was of timber construction." At the turn of the first millennium (c. 1014), the first recorded Dublin Liffey bridge was built at this point. Possibly known as the Bridge of Dubhghall, this basic wooden structure was maintained and rebuilt over several centuries (from early Medieval to Viking to Norman times).

These rebuilds included a Norman bridge (sanctioned by King John) in the early 13th century. This collapsed however in the late 14th century and in 1428, the Dominicans of Ostmantown Friary built the first masonry bridge in Dublin on the same spot. Known as Dublin Bridge, Old Bridge, or simply The Bridge, this four-arch structure had towers at either end, and shops, housing, an inn and a chapel were built on its supports. In 1312, Geoffrey de Morton, Mayor of Dublin 1302–03, was reprimanded for building a house without permission on the bridge. It was he who began building the towers, which were completed by his son-in-law John de Grauntsete, who later built St. Mary's Chapel on the Bridge.

For much of its 390-year life span, The Bridge carried all pedestrian, livestock and horse-drawn traffic across the river, and (as late as 1762) its tolls and chapel were still in use.

At the beginning of the 19th century, Dublin Bridge was replaced by a three-span, elliptical arch stone bridge. Designed by George Knowles (who also designed O'Donovan Rossa Bridge and Lucan Bridge), the bridge was opened in 1818 as Whitworth Bridge, named after Charles Whitworth, 1st Earl Whitworth, the then Lord Lieutenant of Ireland.

As with many other Dublin bridges (particularly those named for British peers), the bridge was renamed following the establishment of the Irish Free State as Dublin Bridge in the 1920s.

In line with another, later, Dublin tradition of naming bridges for temperance campaigners, the bridge was renamed again in 1938 for Father Theobald Mathew (the Apostle of Temperance), who was born at Thomastown near Golden, County Tipperary.
