= Simon de Ludgate =

English-born judge in Ireland

Simon de Ludgate (died 2 October 1302) was an English-born judge in Ireland in the reign of King Edward I of England, who held office as Chief Justice of the Common Pleas for Ireland.

== Career ==
He was born in England, probably in Somerset. He is first heard of in 1287 as an attorney to Gilbert de Clare, 7th Earl of Gloucester (died 1295). He visited Ireland in 1291 and returned there "on the King's business" in 1296. In 1298, being a qualified lawyer who was regarded as "a man experienced in Irish affairs", he was appointed Chief Justice of the Common Pleas, at the King's pleasure, in succession to Sir Robert Bagod, who was too "old and infirm" to continue in office.

In 1299 he and his fellow justices of the Common Pleas heard a lawsuit brought by the notoriously corrupt merchant Geoffrey de Morton, a future Mayor of Dublin, and his wife Matilda (or Maud) de Bree, against Matilda's former bailiff William Haleghton: the Court's decision was that William must give an account of his profits.

Inn the same year he, Thomas de Snyterby and John son of Reryth heard an action for novel disseisin between Richard son of Robert and Master William de la Ryvere, who was special envoy to the Gaelic clans. Judgement was given for the plaintiff

Simon witnessed a rather routine royal charter in 1299.

In 1302 he was Constable of Dublin Castle; he died on 2 October of that year.

== The Countess of Pembroke's case ==
Two years after his death the legality of one of his judgements was questioned by King Edward I himself. The Close Roll states that the King wished the Justiciar of Ireland to be informed as to why Ludgate and his fellow judges had seized the liberty of County Wexford from Joan de Munchensi (also known as Joan de Valence), widow of William de Valence, 1st Earl of Pembroke (Joan had received Wexford on her mother's death as her share of the great Marshal inheritance), and whether they had complied with the King's writ to restore Joan to her property. Simon's successor as Chief Justice, Sir Richard de Exeter, was ordered to search the records of the Common Pleas from his time and report to the Justiciar.

== Family ==
He was presumably the Simon de Ludgate who married Maud de Sancto Mauro (Seymour), daughter and heiress of Peter de Sancto Mauro of Kingston Seymour, Somerset, and widow of Walter de Wengham. They had a son Lawrence, who took his mother's surname. After Maud's death in 1290, there was an inheritance dispute over Lawrence's right to succeed to his mother's estates, as her daughters by her first marriage claimed that her second marriage was bigamous, on the ground of an alleged pre-contract between Simon and a certain Maud de Shelveley. However, Lawrence duly obtained possession of his mother's lands, which passed in turn to his daughter Milicent, who married Sir John Perceval of Eastbury and had issue.

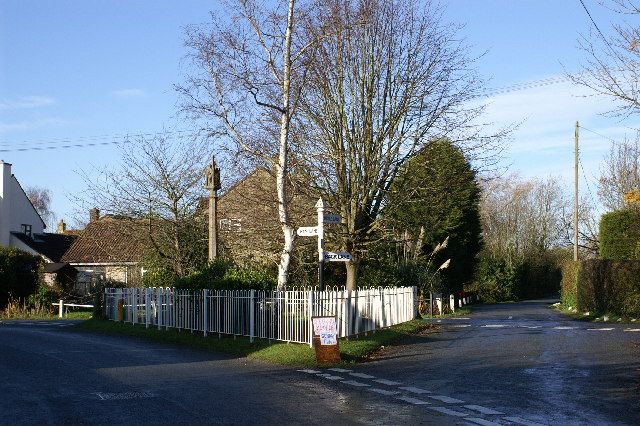
Kingston Seymour, Somerset

== Sources ==
- Anderson, James History of the House of Ivery London 1742
- Ball, F. Elrington The Judges in Ireland 1221-1921 London John Murray 1926
- Calendar of the Justiciary Rolls; or Proceedings in the Court of the Justiciar of Ireland in the 28th to 31st Years of Edward I
- Collins, Arthur Peerage of England 4th Edition London 1768
- Hand, Geoffrey English Law in Ireland 1290-1324 Cambridge University Press 1967
- Red Book of the Exchequer at Dublin, published in the "Transactions of the Chronological Institute of London" 1852
