= Grattan Bridge =

Bridge over the River Liffey in Ireland

Grattan Bridge Droichead Grattan
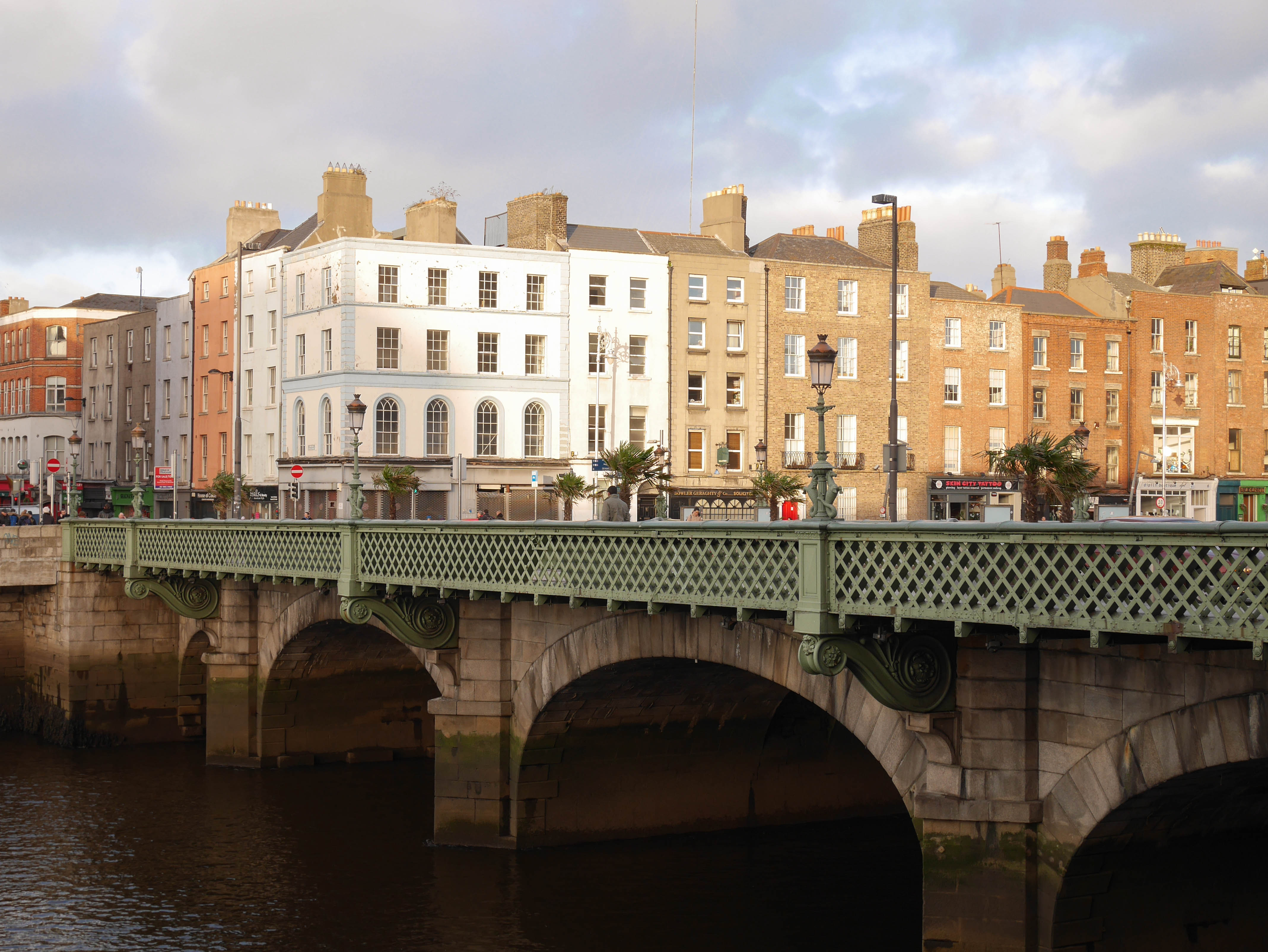
- Grattan Bridge
- Coordinates: 53.3457°N 6.2678°W
- Crosses: River Liffey
- Locale: Dublin, Ireland
- Preceded by: O'Donovan Rossa Bridge
- Followed by: Millennium Bridge

Characteristics
- Material: Stone, iron
- No. of spans: 5 (2 semicircular & 3 elliptical arches)

History
- Designer: William Robinson (1677-78); George Semple (1750s build); Bindon Blood Stoney & Parke Neville (1870s widening)
- Opened: Built 1676 - Essex Bridge; Rebuilt 1753 - Essex Bridge; Rebuilt 1872 - Grattan Bridge

Location
- Interactive map of Grattan Bridge

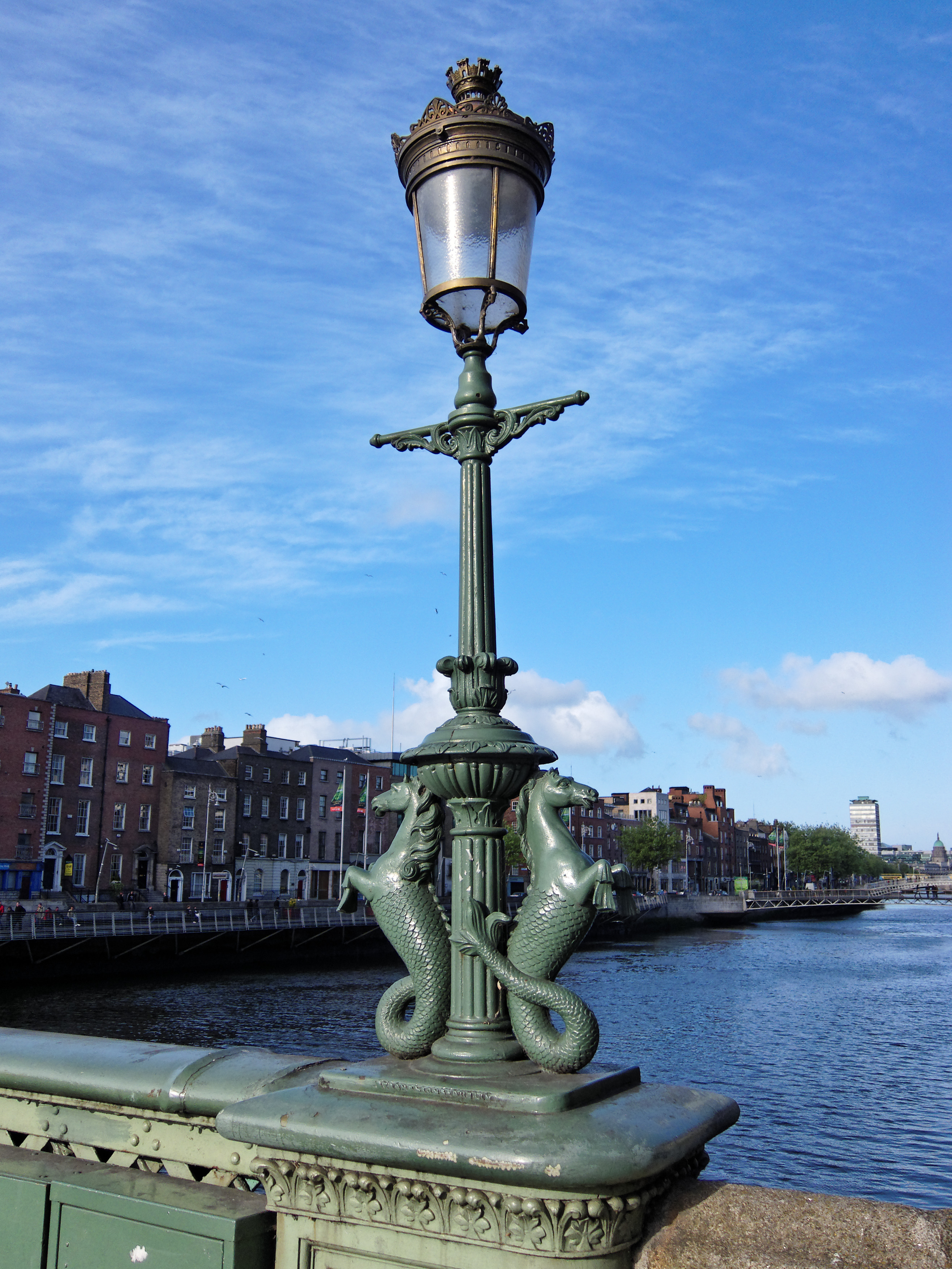
One of the ornate cast iron lamps on the bridge, featuring the mythical hippocampus: half horse, half fish.

Grattan Bridge (Irish: Droichead Grattan) is a road bridge spanning the River Liffey in Dublin, Ireland, and joining Capel Street to Parliament Street and the south quays. The first bridge on the site, the 17th-century Essex Bridge, was damaged in the mid-18th century and largely rebuilt. The current bridge dates primarily from 19th-century remodelling works which widened and flattened the bridge.

== History ==
=== 1st Essex bridge of 1676 ===
The first bridge on this site was developed by Sir Humphrey Jervis in 1676 with William Robinson acting as adviser and contractor. It was named Essex Bridge in honour of Arthur Capell, 1st Earl of Essex, Lord Lieutenant of Ireland who had also provided the finance for the construction of the bridge. It joined several of Jervis' developments (including Capel Street and Jervis Street) to the opposite side of the river and to Dublin Castle.

Essex Bridge was an arched stone structure with seven piers, and apparently partly constructed from the ruined masonry of nearby St. Mary's Abbey on the northside. In 1687, the bridge was damaged by a flood resulting in the loss of a hackney and two horses. The damage to the bridge was only partially repaired.

=== 2nd Essex bridge of 1753 ===
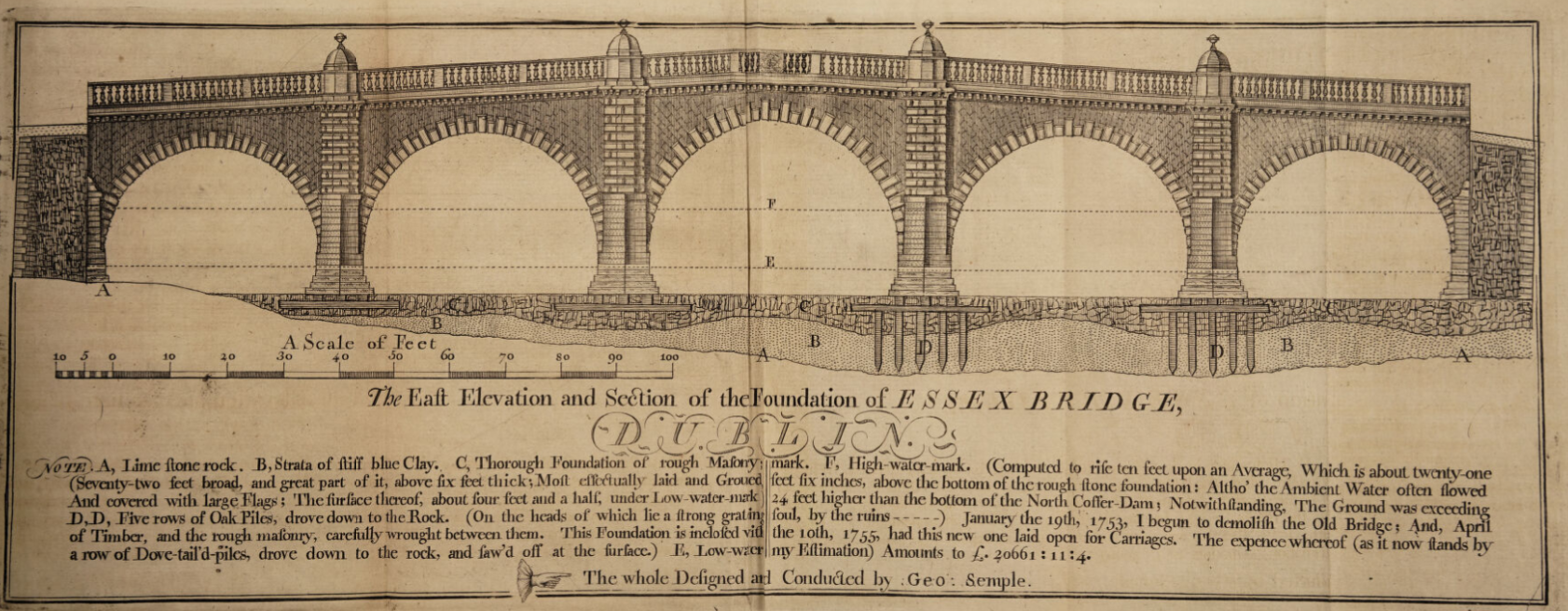
Essex Bridge, Dublin (built 1753-55) - replacing an earlier Essex Bridge

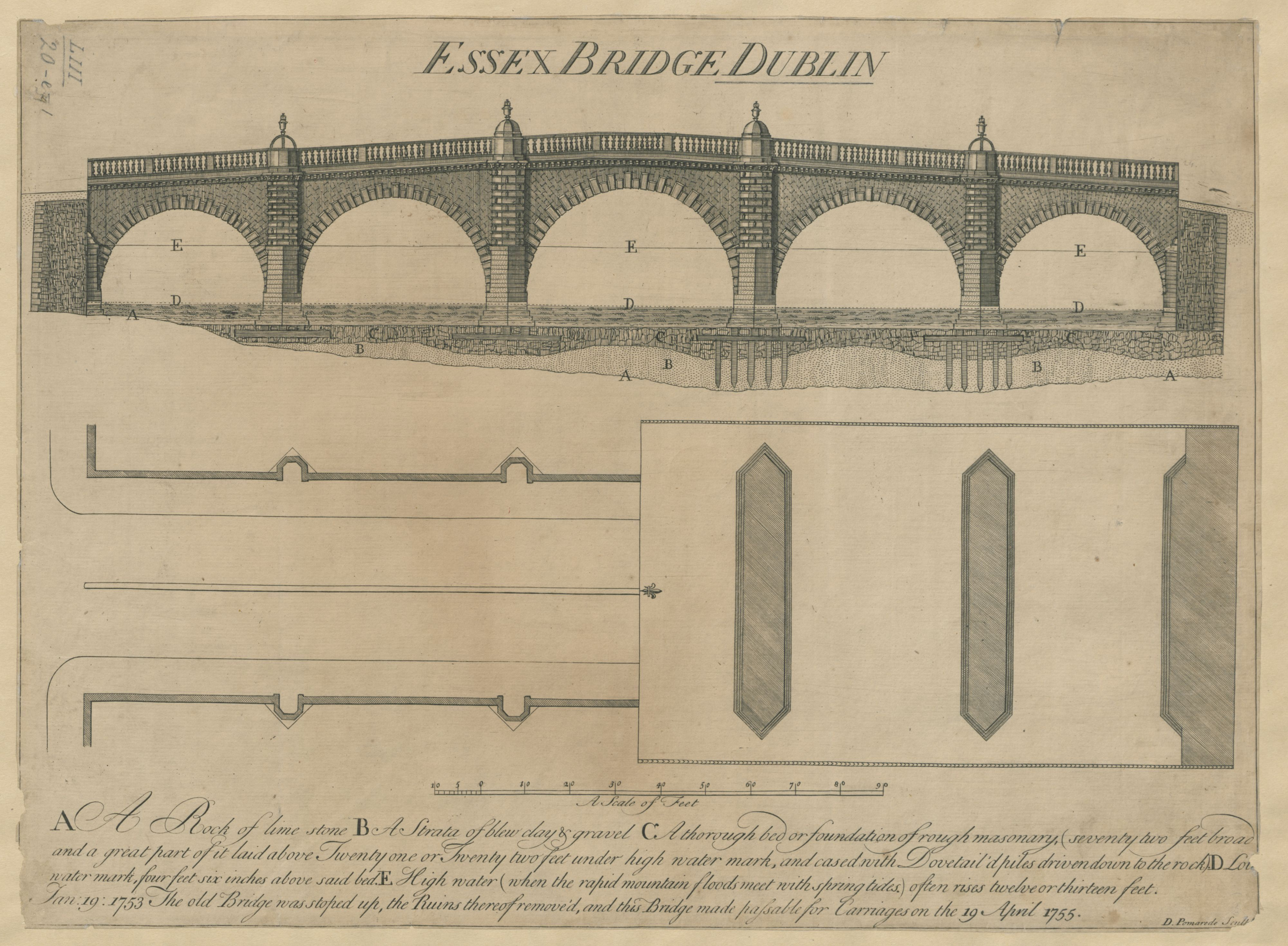
1755 illustration by Daniel Pomerade

In 1751, the second most northerly pier collapsed and damaged the adjacent arches.

Between 1753 and 1755, the bridge was rebuilt by George Semple, to correct flood and other structural damage and as one of the first initiatives of the Wide Streets Commission. The new bridge included stone alcoves or niches on either side of the bridge in a similar manner to London Bridge.

In 1764, an English traveller named John Bush visited Dublin and had the following to say about the bridge:

Over this river there are five bridges, one only of which deserves any notice, Essex-bridge, the lowest of all, which is really a well built, spacious and elegant bridge, with raised foot-paths, alcoves, and ballustrading, on the plan of Westminster-bridge, and about the same width, but not above one-fifth part so long.

For much of the 18th century, Essex Bridge was the most easterly bridge on the Liffey and marked the furthest point upriver to which ships with masts could travel. Many ships needed to travel this far upriver in order to berth in front of the original Custom House, the centre of merchant activity in the city from 1707 until 1791.

During this construction, some original features were removed, including the equestrian statue of George I, by John van Nost the Elder, which was moved in 1798 to the gardens of the Mansion House. In 1937, it was bought by the Barber Institute of Fine Arts in Birmingham, in front of which it still stands.

=== Grattan Bridge of 1874 ===
From 1872, the bridge was further remodelled (on Westminster Bridge in London) by Parke Neville with further modifications by Bindon Blood Stoney, being widened and flattened with cast iron supports extended out from the stonework so as to carry pavements on either side of the roadway. The bridge was (and is still) lit by ornate lamp standards also in cast iron.

The bridge was reopened as Grattan Bridge in 1874, being named after Henry Grattan MP (1746-1820).

=== Later development ===
From 2002, Dublin City Council undertook a reconstruction of the bridge deck, with granite paving for the footpaths and a set of benches with wooden seats and toughened glass backs.

As part of what was intended to be a "European-style book market", in 2004 several temporary kiosks (prefabricated in Spain) were controversially built on the bridge. Originally intended to create "a contemporary version of an inhabited bridge, such as the Ponte Vecchio in Florence", the kiosks were later removed.

== Nomenclature ==
As is a tradition among Dubliners, the name used locally for the bridge will vary from Capel Street Bridge, to Grattan Bridge and the original Essex Bridge.

== Gallery ==
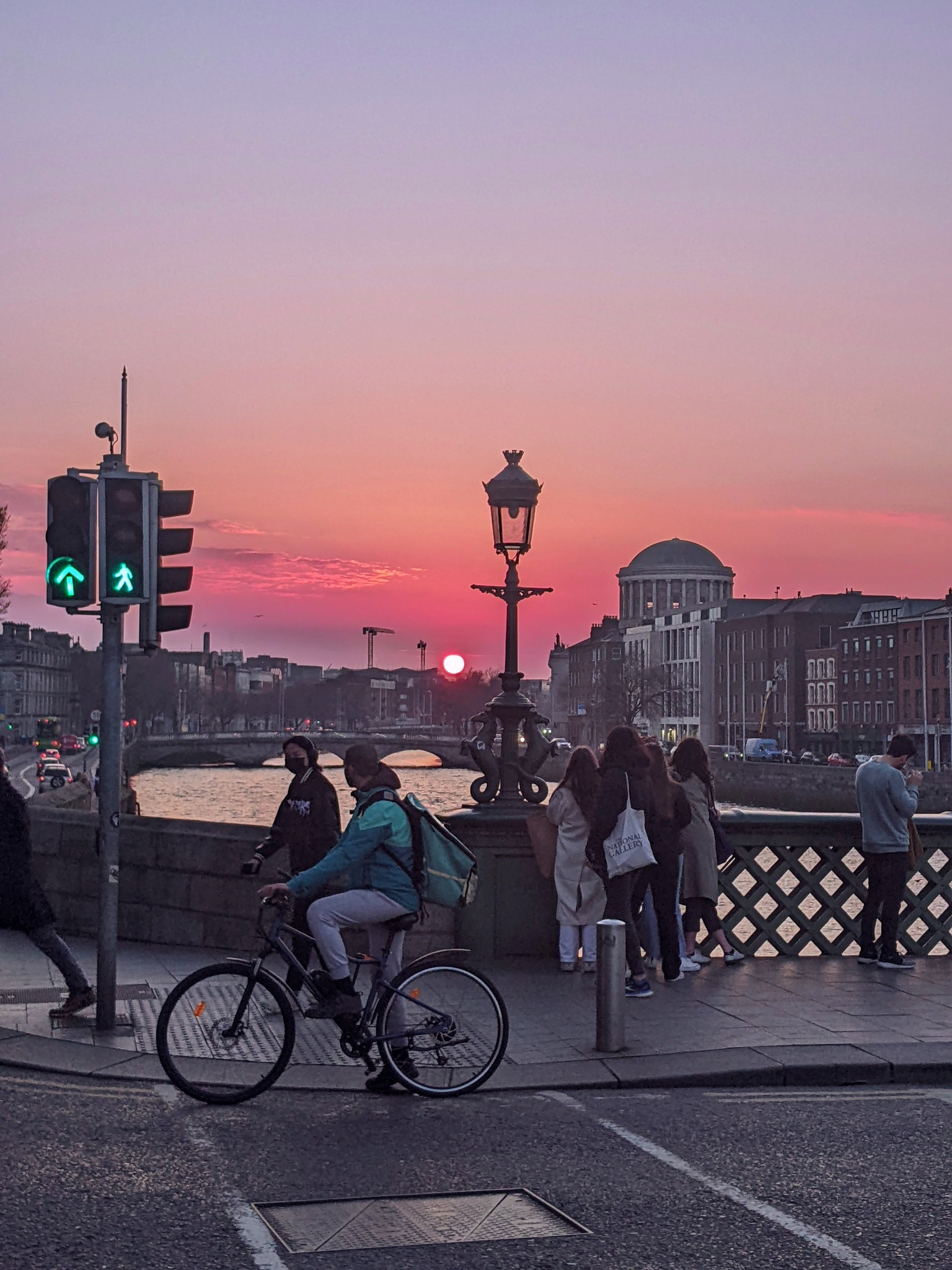
Looking west from the bridge at dusk

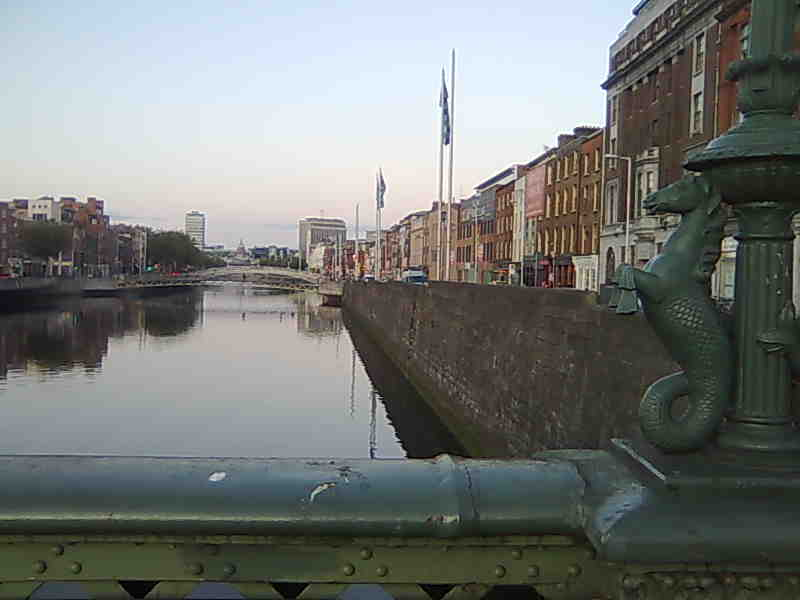
Looking east from the bridge along Wellington Quay

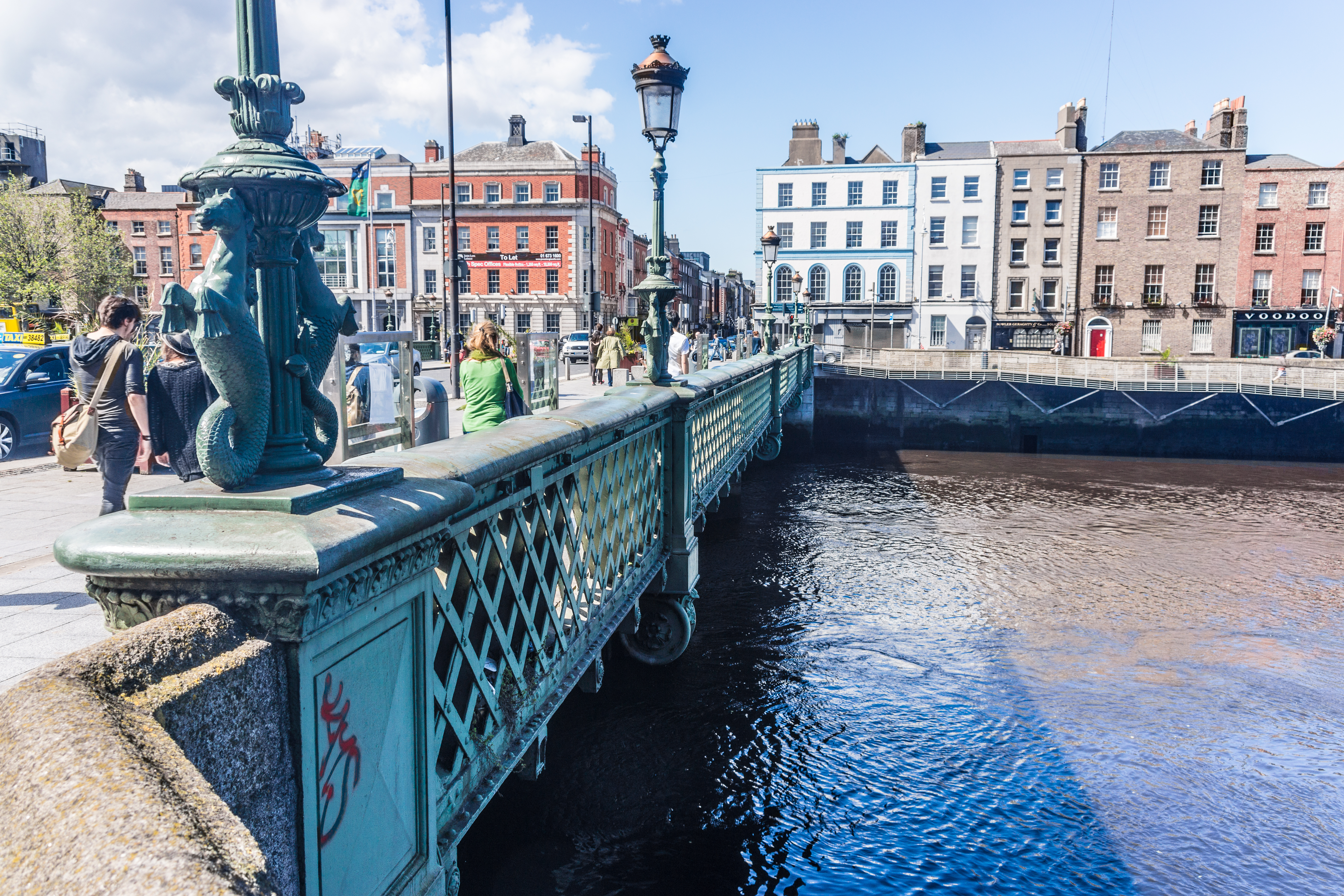
The eastern side of the bridge, looking north towards Capel Street

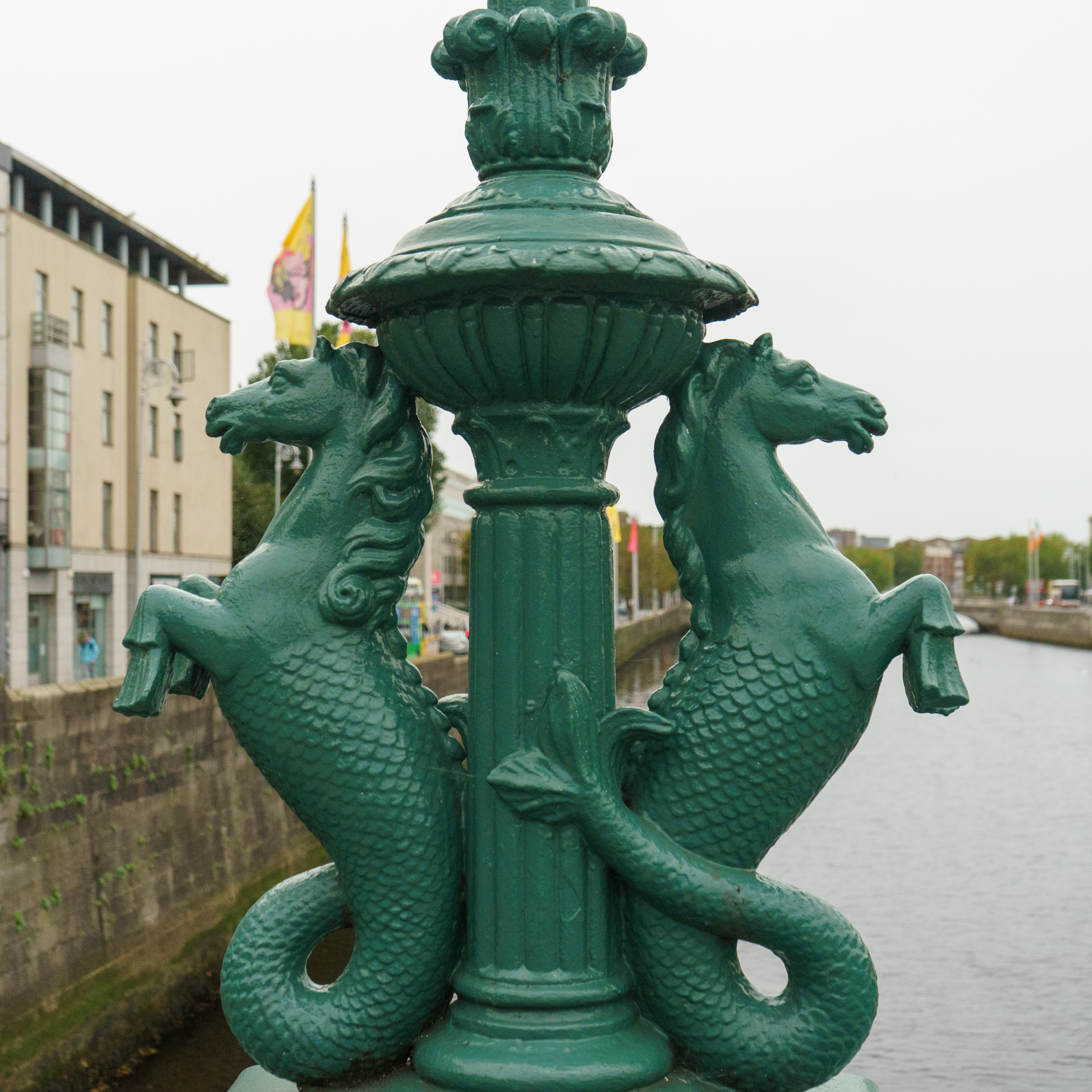
Detail of the hippocampus figures along the bridge

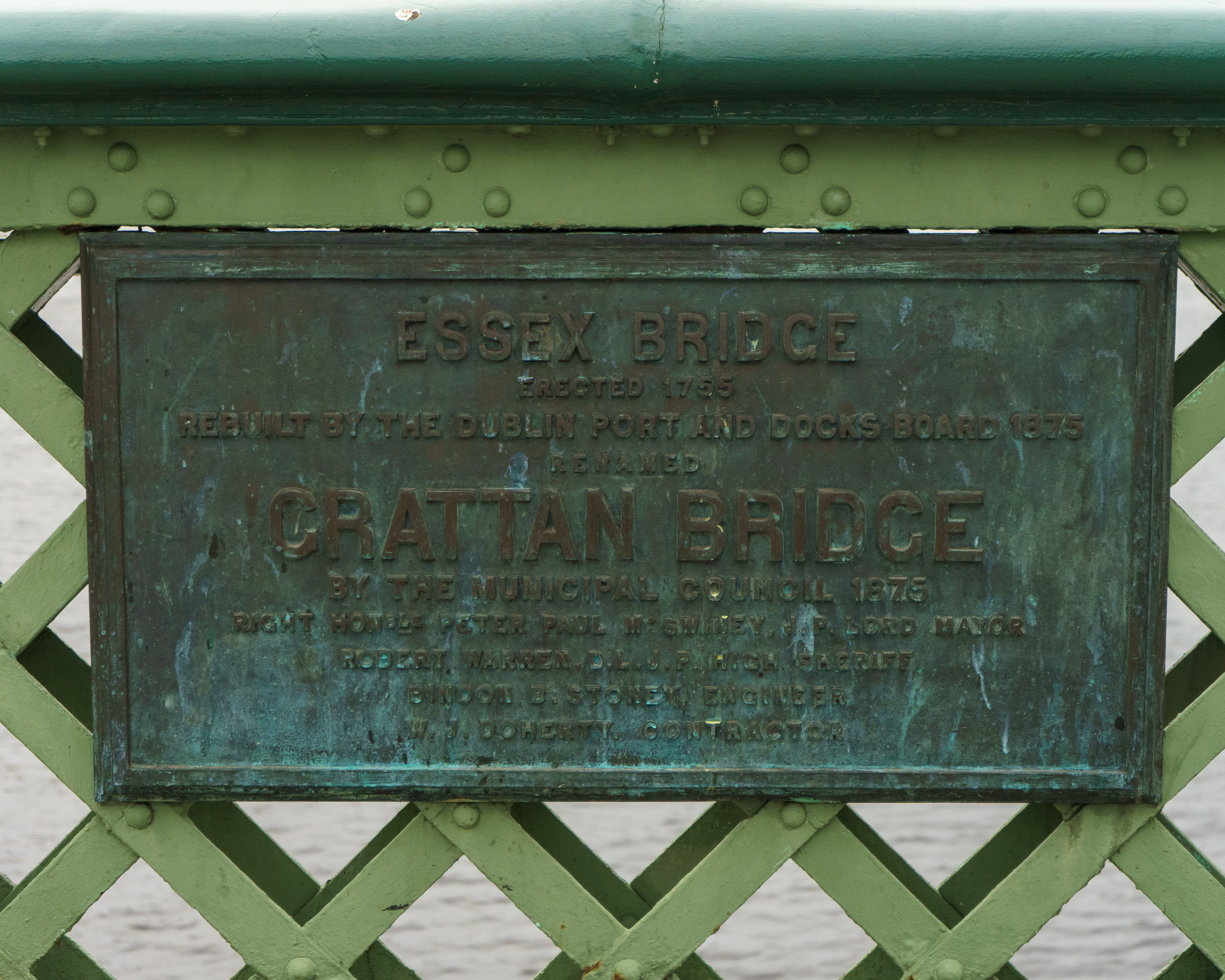
Plaque on the western side of the bridge. Commemorating the renaming of the bridge from Essex Bridge to Grattan Bridge.

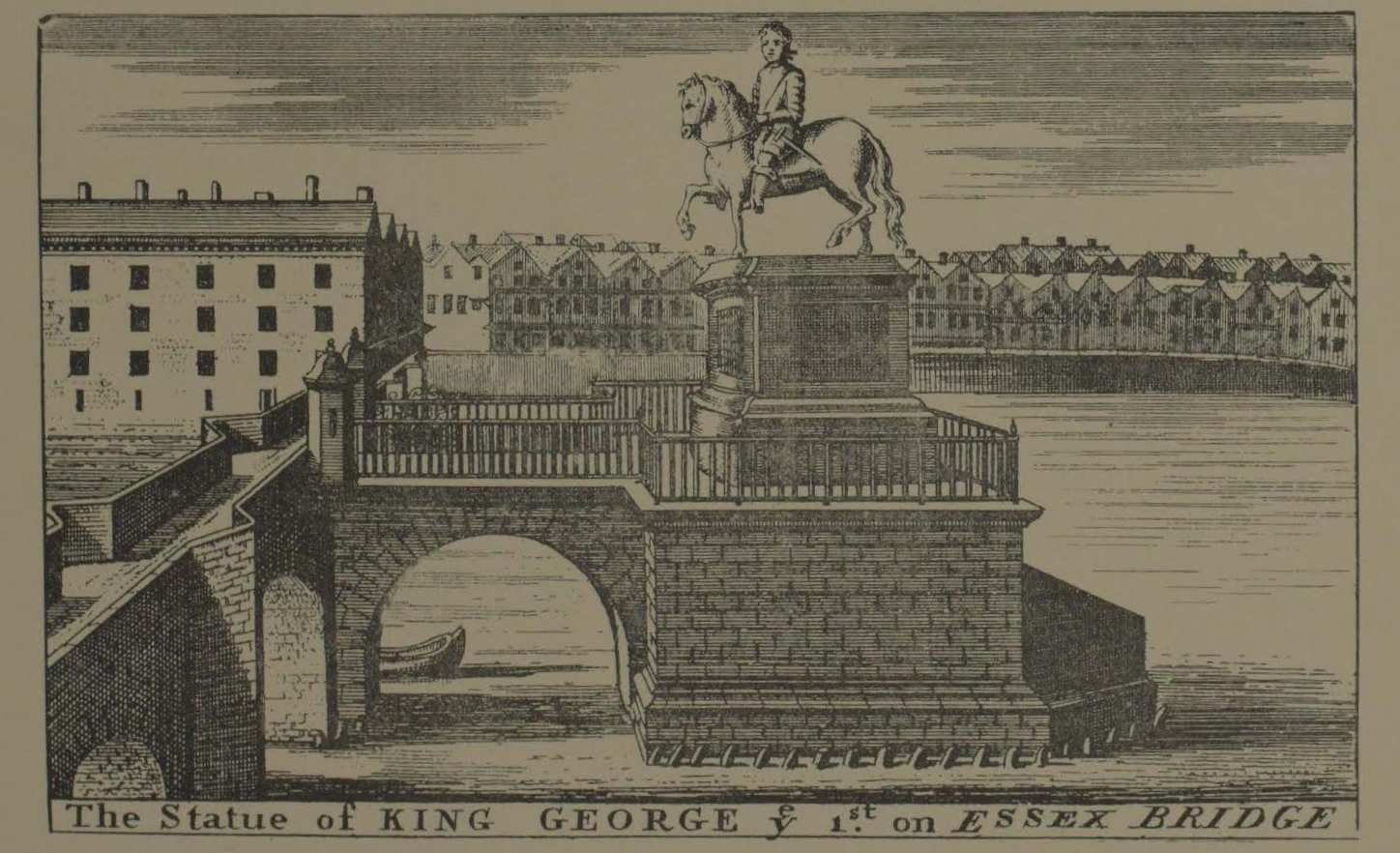
Illustration of Essex Bridge and the statue of George I, taken from Brooking's 1720s map of Dublin, prior to Semple's rebuild of the 1750s
