= Richard de Beresford =

Lord Chancellor of Ireland

Richard de Beresford or Bereford (died after 1318) was an English-born cleric and judge who held high political office in Ireland in the early fourteenth century as Lord High Treasurer of Ireland and Lord Chancellor of Ireland.

== Early career ==
Elrington Ball states that he was a cousin of William Bereford, the English Chief Justice of the Common Pleas 1309-1326, although this relationship has been questioned. The Bereford family came from Barford in Warwickshire. Edmund of Barford or de Bereford was Serjeant-at-law (Ireland) in 1357-8, but it is unclear if he belonged to this family. Richard is first heard of in 1283, when he was collecting taxes in Worcestershire; in 1284 he was in the service of the Bishop of Salisbury. In 1291 he became vicar of St. Mary's, Shenley in Buckinghamshire and held the living till his death. He later complained of theft and serious damage to his property at Shenley. The village is now a part of Milton Keynes.

== Career in Ireland ==
He first came to Ireland in 1300 as Treasurer of Ireland and held that office until 1308. In 1302-3 he was appointed to supervise the weirs on the River Liffey between Dublin and Leixlip, with instructions to inquire from the "worthy gentlemen" of County Dublin and County Kildare as to how they had been maintained, and to remove any damaging items from the weirs.

He was one of five senior Crown officials who were given a royal commission to treat with the Irish magnates for service in the war with Scotland. His conduct as Treasurer came in for serious criticism: shortly after his departure from Ireland Ralph de Monthermer, 1st Baron Monthermer, complained in the Justiciar's Court that Richard had unlawfully seized money and goods to the value of four hundred pounds which should have come to Ralph on the death of his wife Joan of Acre, daughter of King Edward I, in 1307. The Justiciar ordered repayment to Ralph of the full amount claimed, which suggests that Beresford's conduct was questionable at least.

In 1305 Geoffrey de Morton, lately Lord Mayor of Dublin, brought a series of lawsuits against Beresford. Beresford filed a counterclaim accusing Morton of corruption. Morton in later years became notorious for his malfeasance and unscrupulous business practices. Nonetheless, Beresford was removed as Treasurer and a commission of oyer and terminer was set up to adjudicate on Morton's claims, and unrelated accusations by Geoffrey de Geneville, 1st Baron Geneville, concerning Beresford's interference with Geneville's liberties in his barony of Trim, County Meath. Beresford was found guilty and imprisoned in Dublin Castle, but apparently succeeded in having the guilty verdict reversed. He is next heard of at Westminster having his accounts audited.

Beresford was Lord Chancellor of Ireland from 1314 to August 1317. He was also a justice of assize for six English counties.

He was last heard of in his official capacity in August 1317. He died after 1318, when he was still serving as vicar of Shenley.
