= Lucan Bridge =

Bridge over the River Liffey in Ireland

Lucan Bridge Droichead Leamhcáin
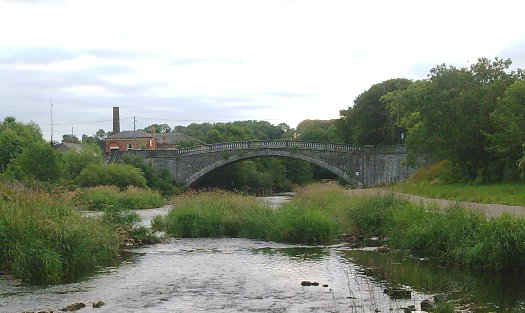
- River Liffey and Lucan Bridge
- Coordinates: 53.359959°N 6.446207°W
- Carries: R109 road
- Crosses: River Liffey
- Locale: Lucan, Dublin, Ireland
- Followed by: West-Link

Characteristics
- Design: Arch bridge
- Material: Ashlar masonry
- Total length: 33m
- No. of spans: 1

History
- Designer: George Knowles
- Construction end: 1814

Location
- Interactive map of Lucan Bridge

Lucan Bridge (Irish: Droichead Leamhcáin) is a road bridge spanning the River Liffey in Lucan, Dublin, Ireland. It joins Lucan's Main Street to the Lower Lucan Road, carrying traffic towards Clonsilla and the north, and the Strawberry Beds to the east. Designed by George Knowles (architect of Dublin's Fr. Mathew and O'Donovan Rossa Bridges), it was built in 1814. Constructed in collaboration with James Savage at a cost of more than £9,000, it replaced several previous bridges which had been carried away by floods.

The bridge is the largest single span masonry arch bridge in Ireland, and is constructed from ashlar masonry with a span of 33 metres (110 feet) and a rise of 6.7 metres (22 feet). It is framed by iron balustraded parapets made by the Royal Phoenix ironworks of Parkgate Street in Dublin.

== Design and construction ==
The first bridge built on this spot was a stone bridge laid down in the later years of the reign of King John (c. 1200). A subsequent bridge was built by the first Agmondisham Vesey c. 1730, but washed away within very short time. The next was built c. 1771, but this too washed away in a flood in 1786, as did its replacement in a storm in 1802.

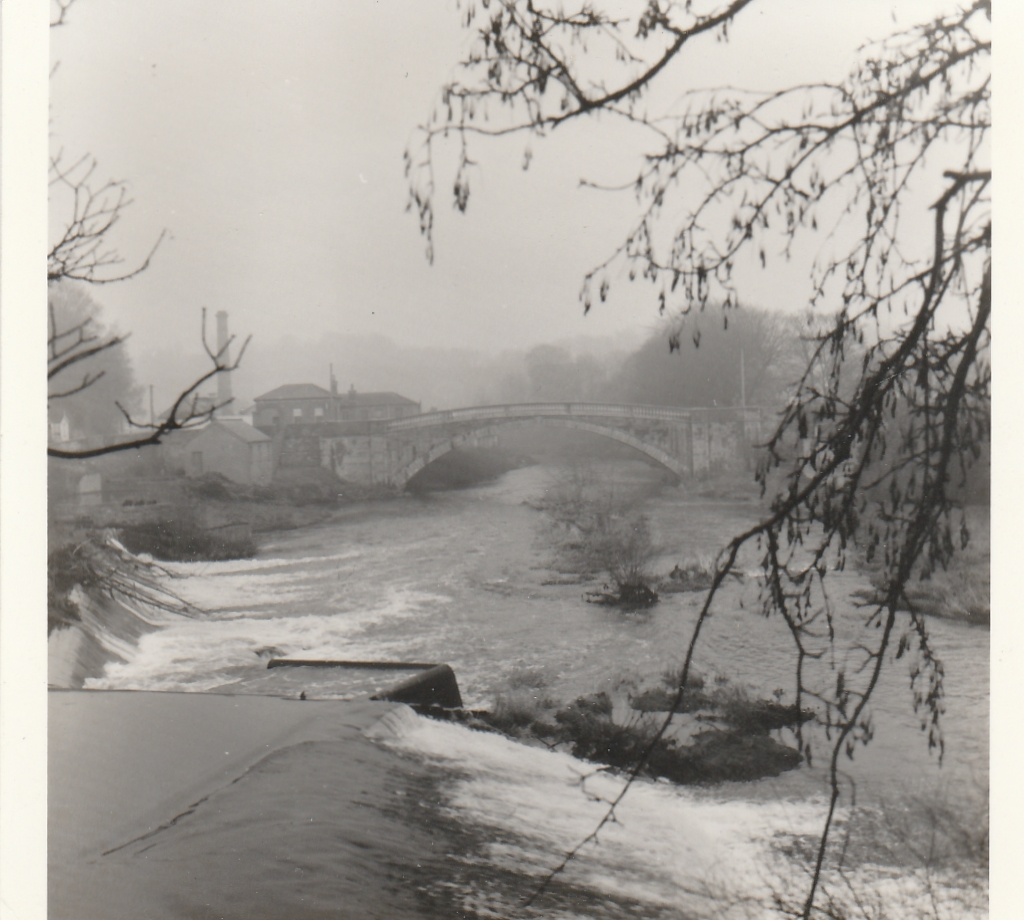
The bridge in early 1977

The design of the bridge was inspired by Island Bridge, a.k.a. Sarah Bridge, near Kilmainham which was completed in 1793. The walls are made of squared limestone, with the slender, ashlar voussoirs drawing the curve of the arch below. Whilst the geology of the river banks could have befitted a shorter bridge, Knowles was suspected of purposefully elongating the bridge to 110 ft to give it the honour of being the longest single-span bridge in Ireland, a record it still holds.

In 1814, the present single-span bridge was completed by Savage & Knowles, and has remained largely unaffected by the effects of flooding common to this stretch of the Liffey. The bridge appears today largely in the same way as early 19th-century visitors would have seen it. The bridge, however, has seen some recent developments, with the raising of the roadway near both ends of the arch to lessen the gradient for road traffic. Repairs were carried out in 2011 whereby lost capping was replaced, stonework was repointed and the balustrades were given a fresh coat of paint.

In 2021, it was featured in the RTÉ One series Droichid na hÉireann. Lucan Bridge is designated as a protected structure within the South Dublin County Development Plan 2022-2028.
