= Headfort House =

18th century country house near Kells, County Meath, Ireland

Coordinates: 53.734214°N 6.847212°W

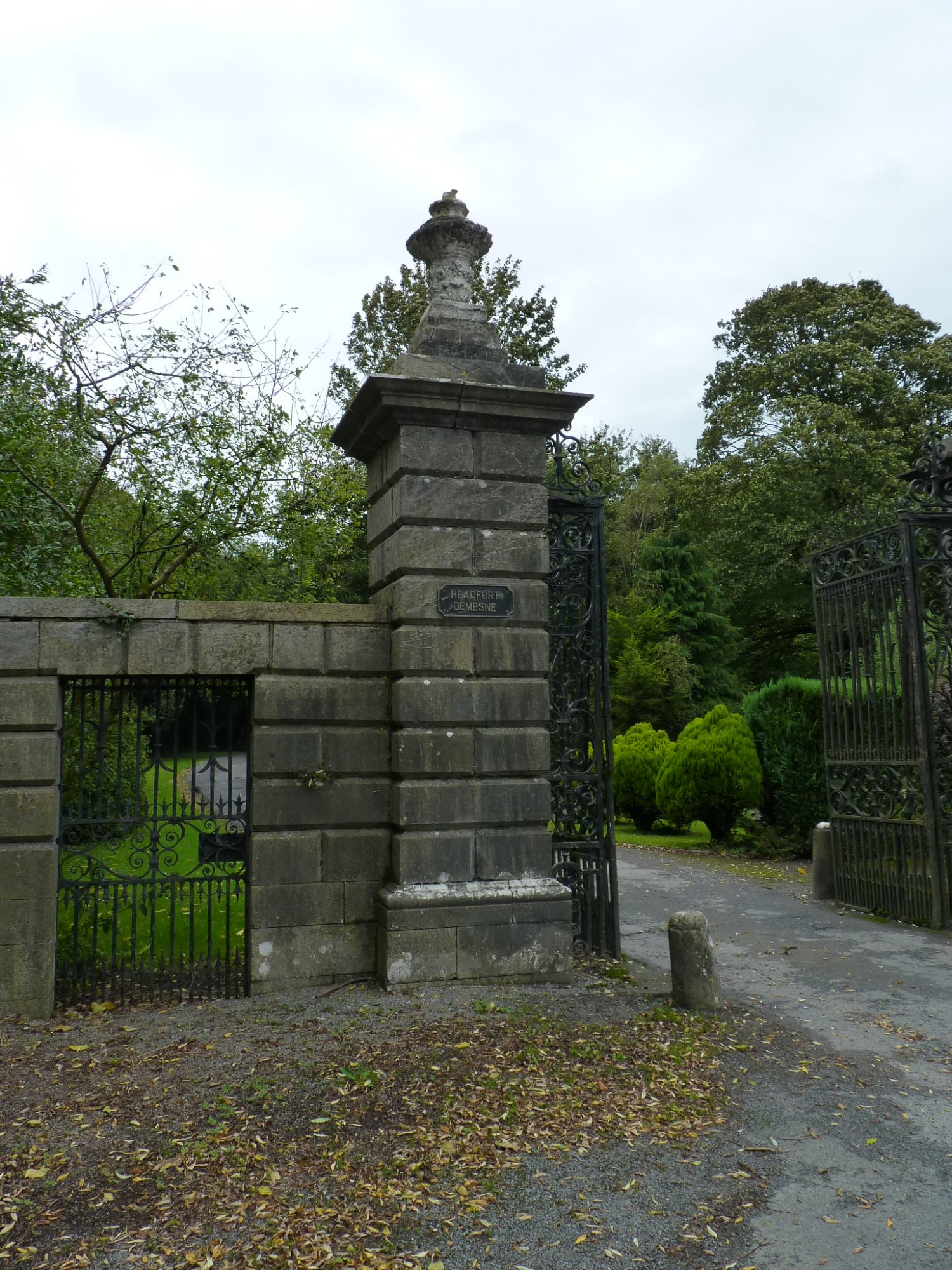
- Entrance gates to Headfort House

General information
- Status: School
- Type: House
- Architectural style: Palladian
- Location: Kells, County Meath, Ireland
- Construction started: 1769
- Completed: 1771

Technical details
- Material: Ardbraccan limestone
- Floor count: 3

Design and construction
- Architects: George Semple and overseen by Thomas Cooley
- Developer: Thomas Taylour, 1st Earl of Bective
- Other designers: Robert Adam and James McCullagh (interiors and stuccowork)

Headfort House is a large country house on the southern outskirts of Kells in County Meath, Ireland.

== History ==
The house was constructed in the 1760s for The 1st Earl of Bective to a design by the Irish architect George Semple. The interiors were designed by the Scottish architect Robert Adam.

It remained wholly in the private hands of the Taylour family, Marquesses of Headfort, until 1949, when the family leased the main house to the newly formed Headfort School. They moved to the East Wing, and provided the element of the building in-between the wing and the main house as a house for the school's headmaster. The 6th Marquess of Headfort later sold the East Wing, renamed as Headfort Court, and with its own garden, along with the school premises in the 1980s (on terms allowing the school to continue) to an American, B.J. Kruger, and on his death, the estate was divided. The East Wing / Headfort Court became a distinct property, as did part of the grounds, and the main house and much of the grounds were purchased by a charitable trust, the Headfort Trust, to preserve the buildings and support the school.

In 2004, the house was selected by the World Monuments Fund (WMF) for inclusion in its List of 100 Most Endangered Sites

The school closed in March 2020 but was reopened under new management in September 2020.

== Robert Adam's illustrations of Headfort House interior ==
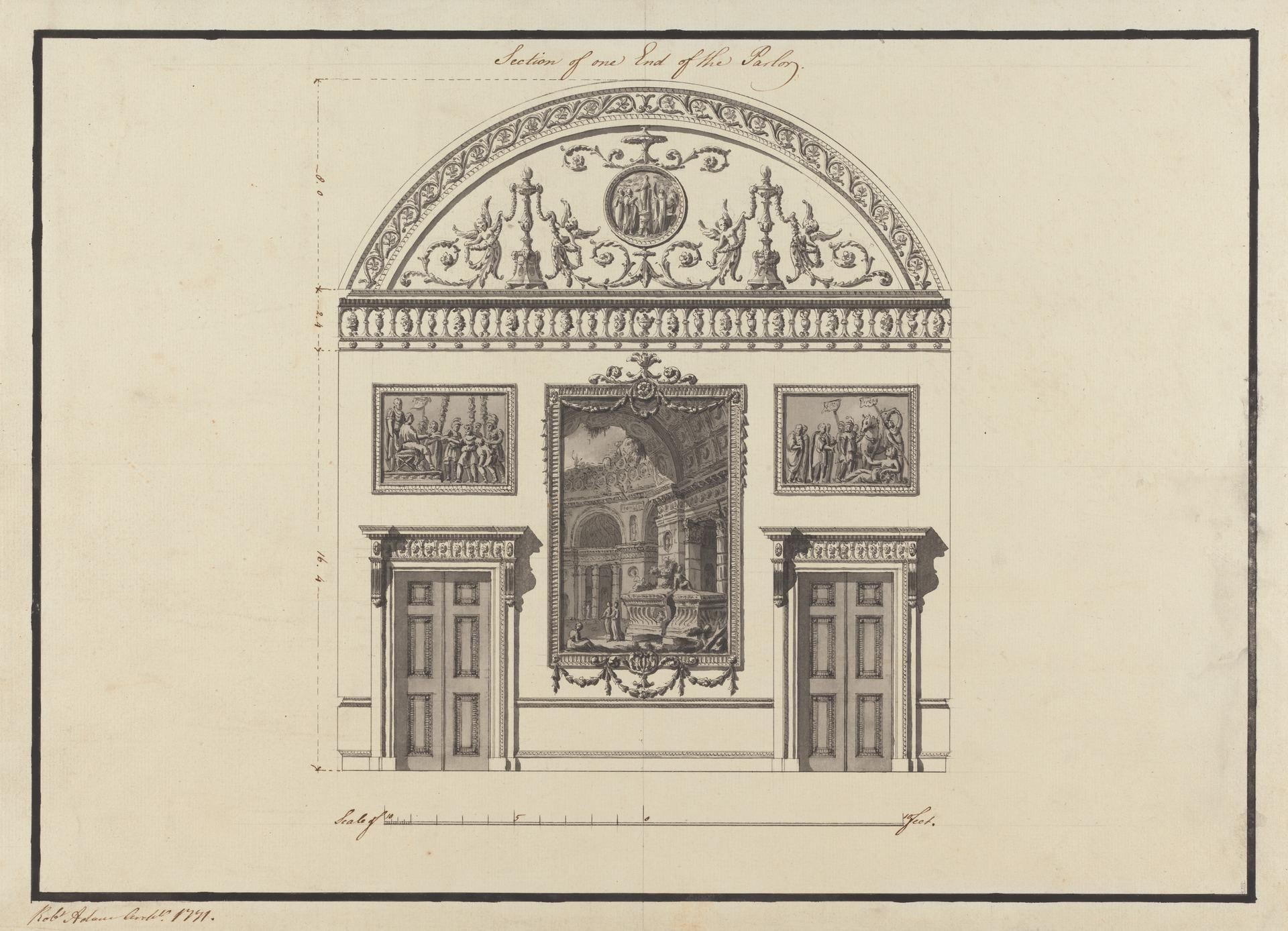

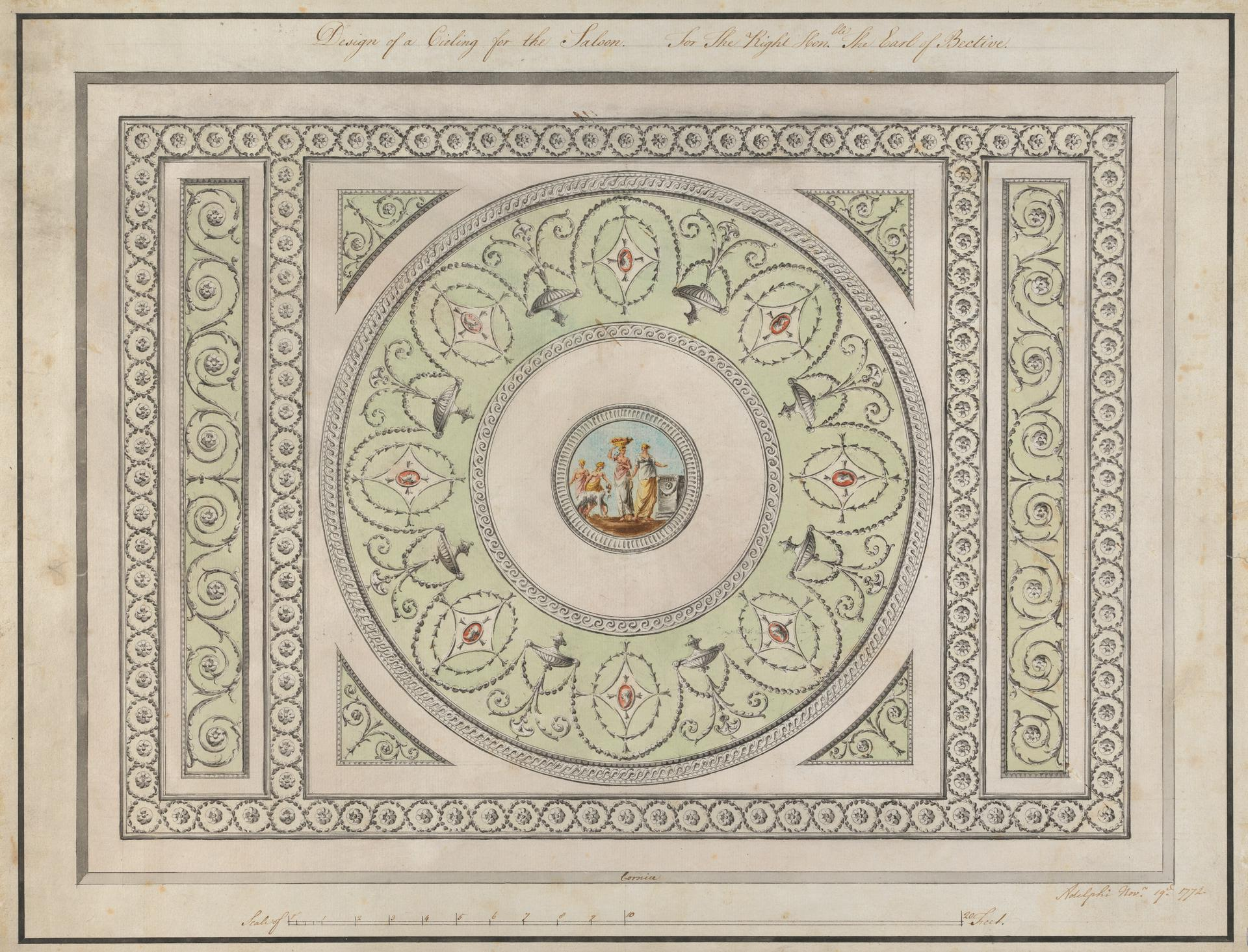

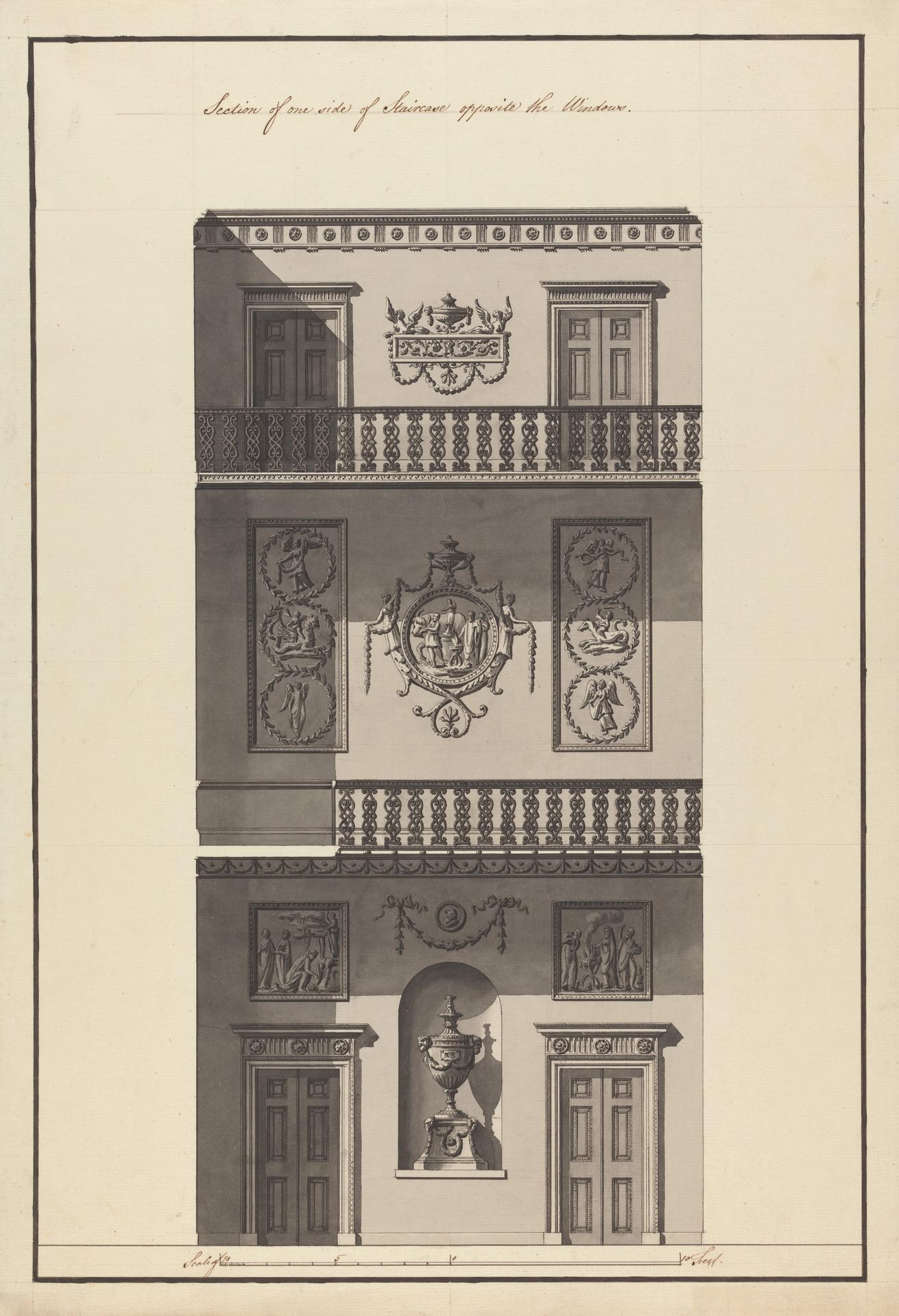

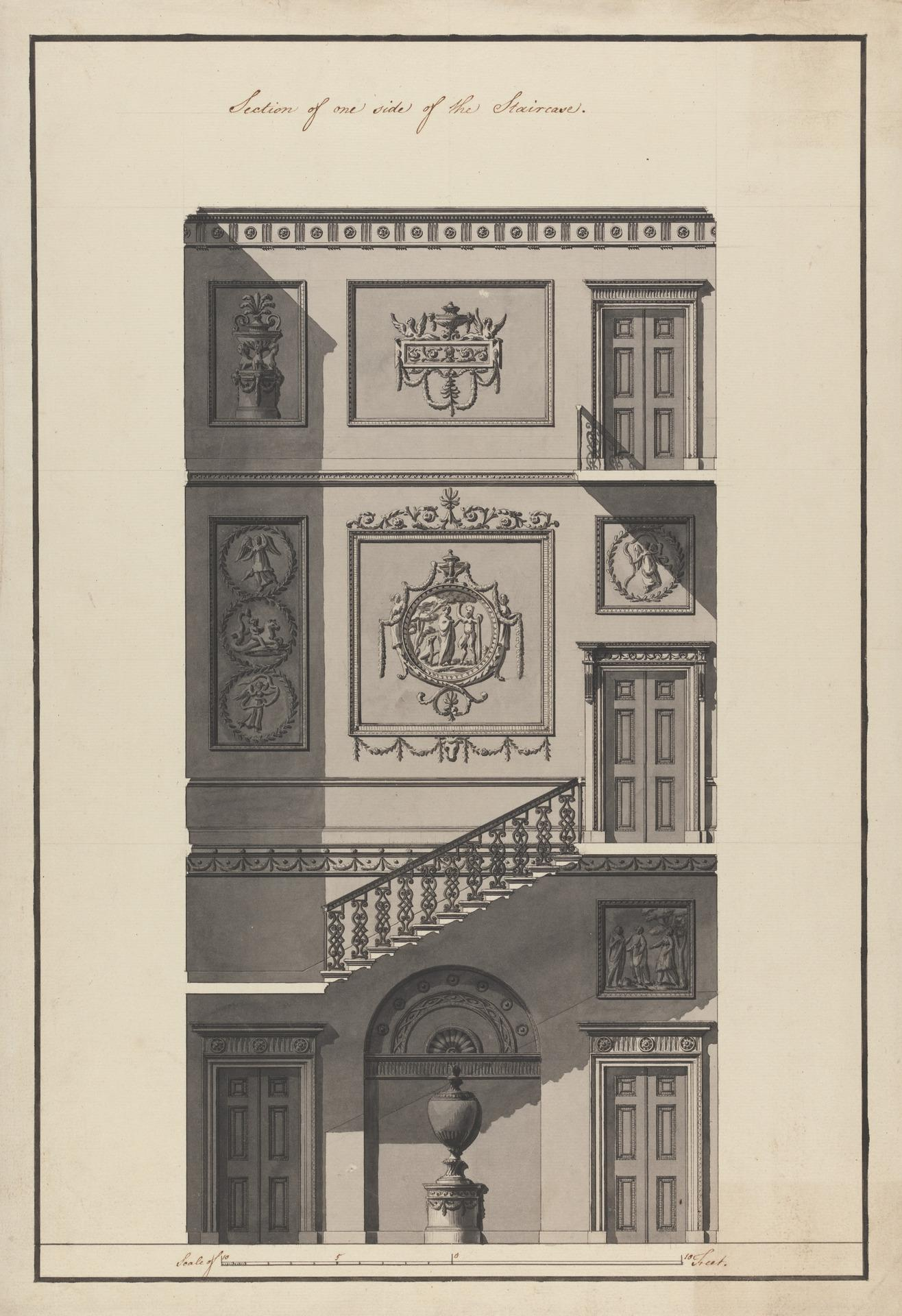

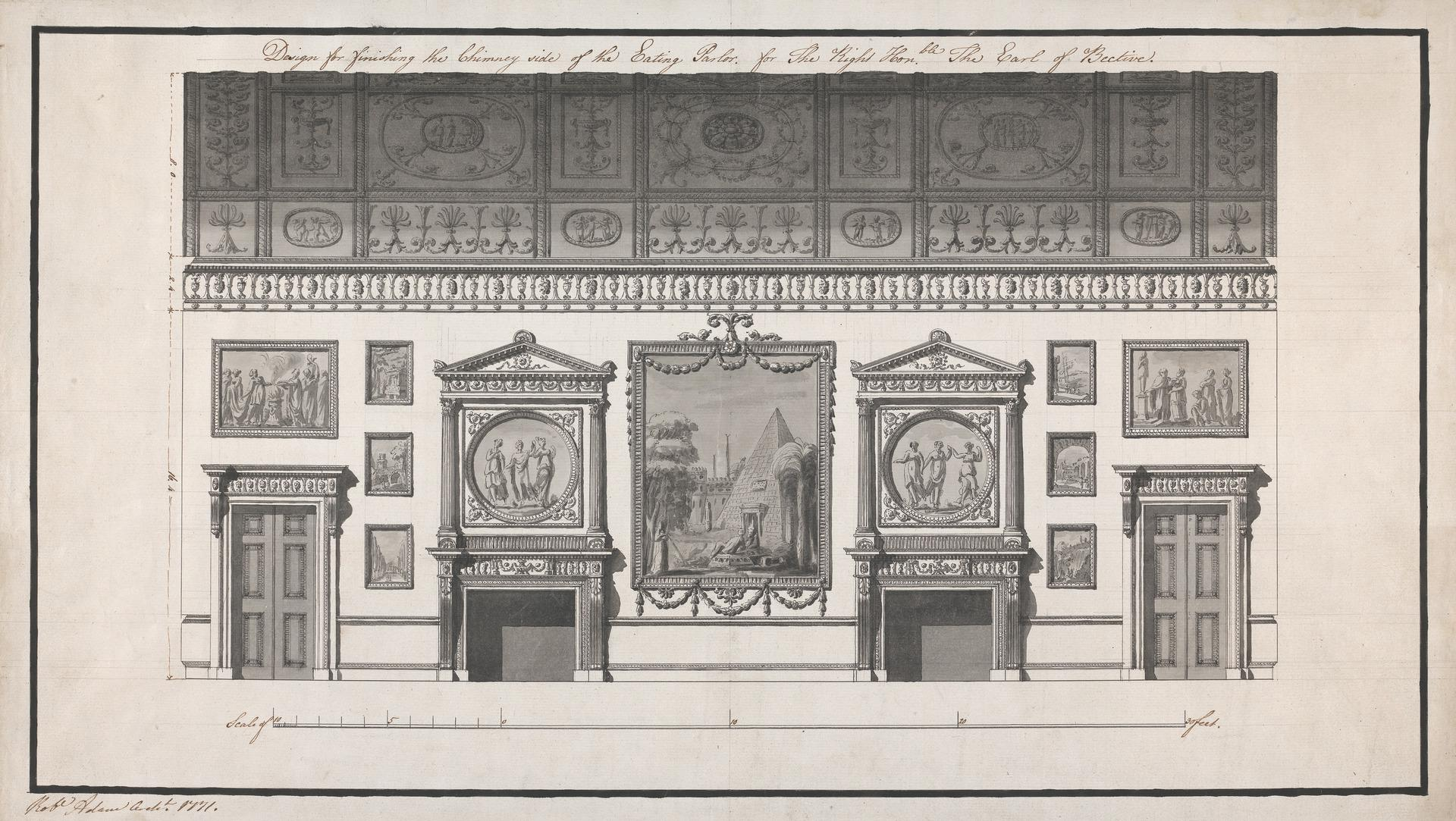

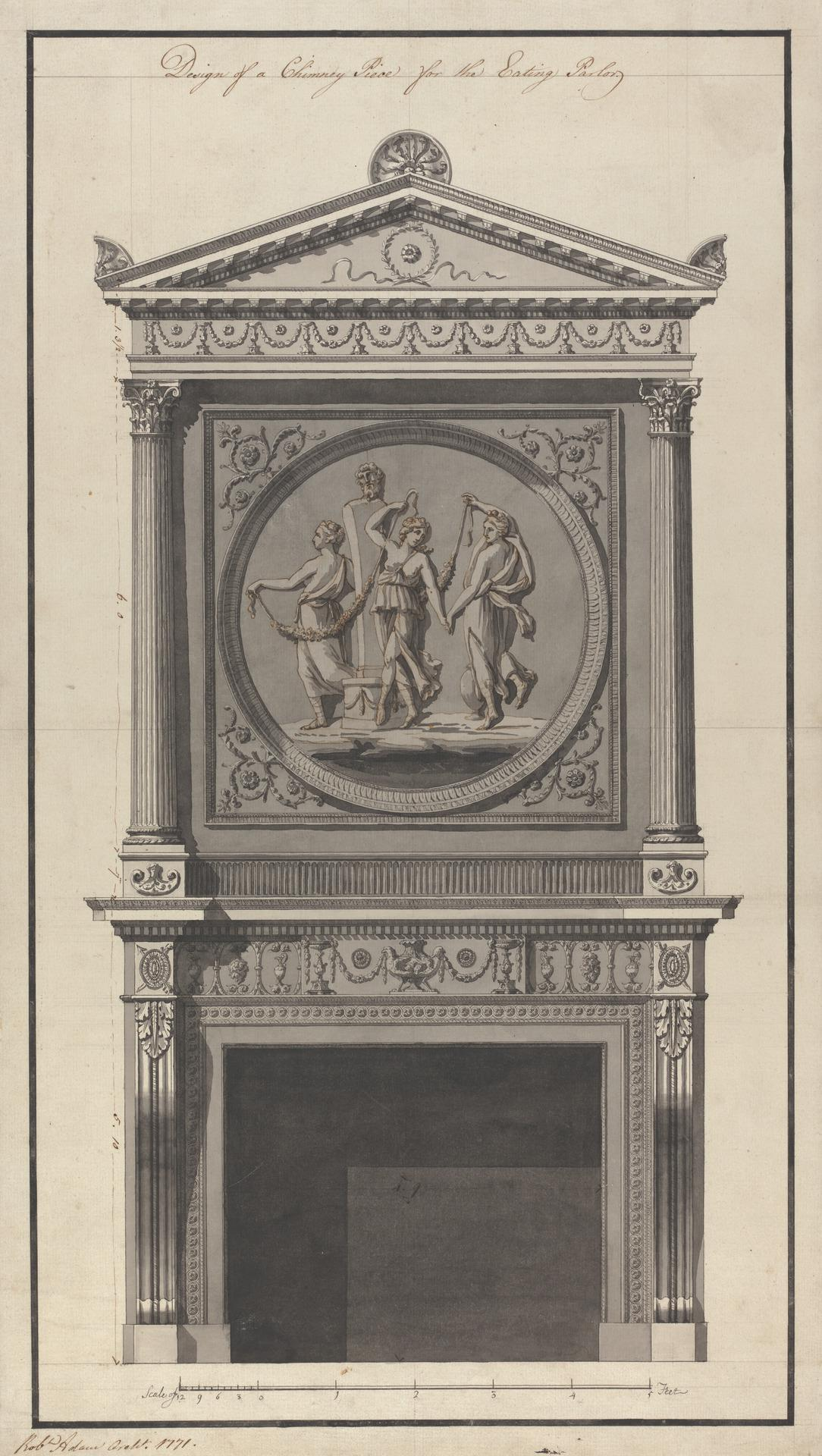

== See also ==
- List of buildings in Ireland
