= George Semple =

Irish builder and architect

- Born: 1700; Ireland
- Died: 13 April 1782 (aged 81–82); Queen Street, Dublin
- Occupation: Architect
- Relatives: John Semple (grand nephew)
- Buildings: Essex Bridge; Headfort House; St Patrick's Hospital; St. Patrick's Cathedral (steeple)

George Semple (c. 1700 – 13 April 1782) was an Irish builder, engineer, and architect.

== Life ==
George Semple was born circa 1700 in Dublin, he claimed to be the son of a workman. No further detail of his early or family life is known. His brother was John Semple, also a builder, through whom he was the grand uncle of the architect, John Semple. There is some connection to landed gentry in the west of Ireland and to the Church. In 1735, he was admitted as a freeman of the city of Dublin. His earliest known work is the steeple, 103 feet (31.4 m) in height, of St. Patrick's Cathedral, Dublin, which he designed and erected in 1749.

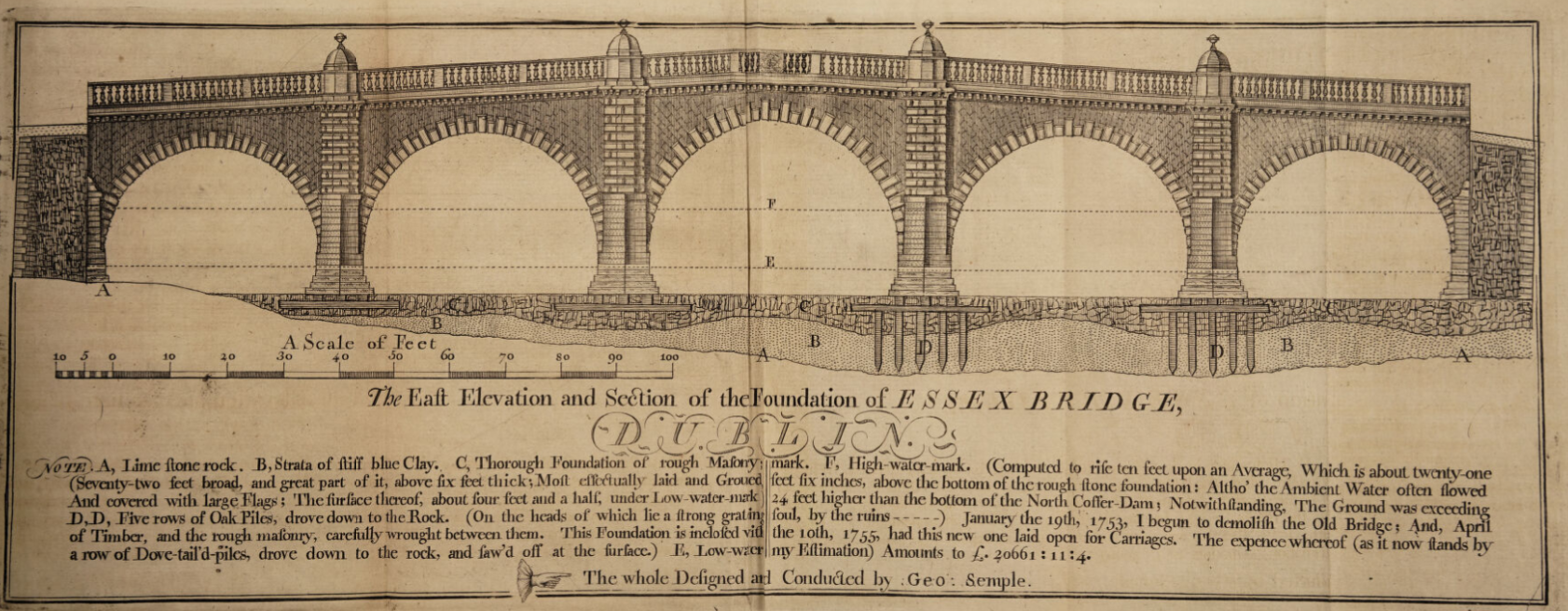
Essex Bridge, Dublin (built 1753–55), replacing an earlier Essex Bridge.

He also built St Patrick's Hospital (1749–57), which was founded in 1747 with money bequeathed by Jonathan Swift following his death in 1745. In 1754, he bought land on Queen Street, built houses there, and lived on that street for the rest of his life. He also built houses on Capel Street, and country residences for other clients including Charles Cobbe.

His best known work was Essex Bridge across the River Liffey (now replaced with Grattan Bridge). This was begun in 1752, and completed in 1754, and was considered one of the best bridges in Ireland. The government awarded him £500 for his efforts. Essex Bridge was taken down in 1872 and replaced by the present Grattan Bridge, leading from Parliament Street to Capel Street. Semple later wrote a book, Treatise on Building in Water, first published in 1776, which was based on this project. The project took a considerable toll on Semple's health.

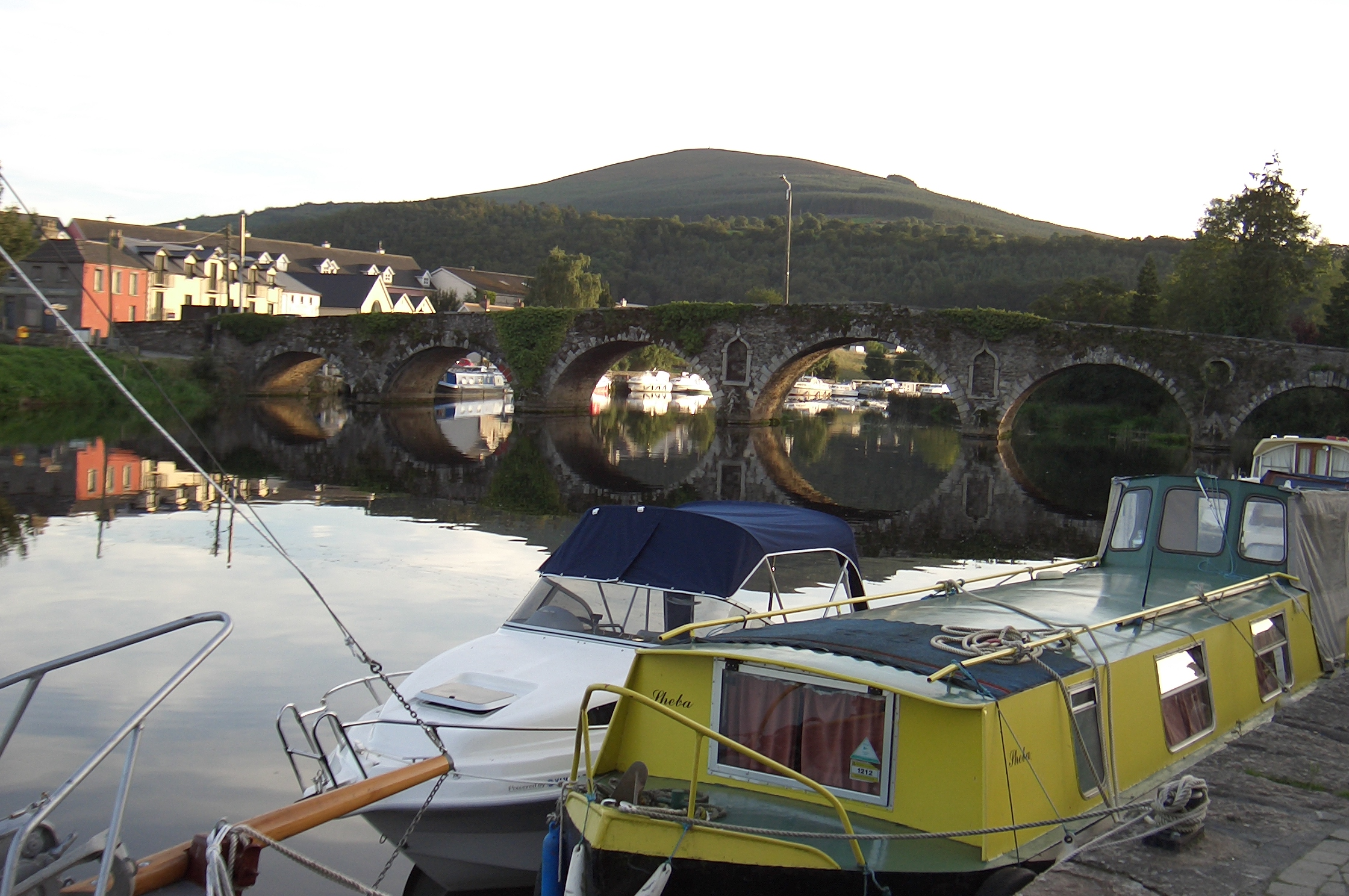
Graiguenamanagh Bridge

He constructed Headfort House in the 1760s for Sir Thomas Taylour, later 1st Earl of Bective (1724–1795) (see Marquess of Headfort). It lies above the River Blackwater, a tributary of the River Boyne, just outside the early ecclesiastical town of Kells in the northwest of County Meath. In the 1760s he also constructed the bridge over the River Barrow at Graiguenamanagh, County Kilkenny and others within the same Kilkenny. His later work consisted mostly of canals. In 1762, he presented a portfolio of seven charts to the Ballast Office with his plans for the development of Dublin Port.

Semple died in his home on Queen's Street in April 1782. He married around 1740, but only his widowed daughter is recorded in his will.
