= Anthony Clare =

Irish psychiatrist (1942–2007)

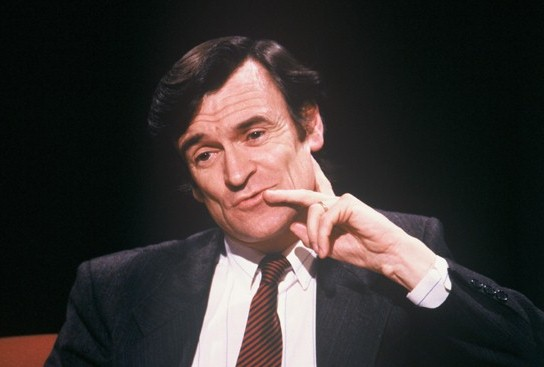
- Hosting television discussion programme After Dark in 1987
- Born: Anthony Ward Clare; 24 December 1942; Dublin, Ireland
- Died: 28 October 2007 (aged 64); Paris, France
- Other name: Tony
- Education: University College Dublin (MB BCh BAO, 1966); Institute of Psychiatry (MA, MD)
- Occupations: Psychiatrist, author, broadcaster
- Employer(s): St Bartholomew's Hospital (Professor and Head of Department of Psychological Medicine, 1983–1988)
- Known for: In the Psychiatrist's Chair
- Spouse: Jane Hogan
- Children: 7
- Parent(s): Ben Clare; Agnes Clare (née Dunne)

Anthony Ward Clare (24 December 1942 – 28 October 2007) was an Irish psychiatrist and a presenter of radio and television programmes. He was the presenter of the radio series In the Psychiatrist's Chair, an interview and discussion programme, which aired on BBC Radio 4.

== Career ==
Clare was born in Dublin to Agnes (née Dunne) and Ben Clare, and was educated at Gonzaga College. He read medicine at University College Dublin (UCD), where he was an auditor of the Literary and Historical Society, and graduated in 1966. During his time at UCD, he won the 1964 Observer Mace debating competition, speaking in a team with Patrick Cosgrave. Following initial training in psychiatry at St Patrick's Hospital, Dublin, he moved to the Institute of Psychiatry (now part of King's College London) at the Maudsley Hospital in London, where he studied under Professor Michael Shepherd. Clare held a doctorate in medicine and a master's degree in philosophy, and was a fellow of the Royal College of Psychiatrists.

Author of several popular books on psychiatry, Clare held the positions of Professor and Head of Department of Psychological Medicine at St Bartholomew's Hospital, London, Professor of Clinical Psychiatry at Trinity College Dublin and medical director of St Patrick's Hospital, Dublin. At the time of his death, Clare was serving as Consultant General Adult Psychiatrist at St. Edmundsbury Hospital in Lucan, Dublin.

In the 1980s and 1990s, Clare was the best-known psychiatrist in Britain. His first media appearances were on the light-hearted BBC Radio 4 discussion programme Stop the Week. He was also for many years the voice of the BBC popular science programme QED. Clare became famous for his probing interviews on radio and television with well-known figures such as Bob Monkhouse and Paddy Ashdown in several series of In the Psychiatrist's Chair, which ran from 1982.

== Personal life and death ==
As a young man Clare lost his Catholic faith and later explained why in a newspaper interview.

I can't really believe in a God that can suddenly and haphazardly intervene during one moment of history, causing air crashes, genocide and famine.

Clare married Jane Hogan in 1966 and they had seven children together.

He was due to retire from his post as Consultant General Adult Psychiatrist at St Edmundsbury Hospital (now St. Patrick's Mental Health Services) in Lucan, Dublin when he died suddenly of a heart attack in Paris at the age of 64.

== Television programmes ==
- QED
- After Dark
- In the Psychiatrist's Chair

== Radio programmes ==
- In the Psychiatrist's Chair
- Father Figures
- All in the Mind

== Books ==
- Depression and How to Survive It (Co-written with Spike Milligan)
- Lovelaw
- In the Psychiatrist's Chair I, II & III
- On Men: Masculinity in Crisis
- Psychiatry in Dissent: Controversial Issues in Thought and Practice
