= Dr Steevens' Hospital =

Former hospital in Ireland

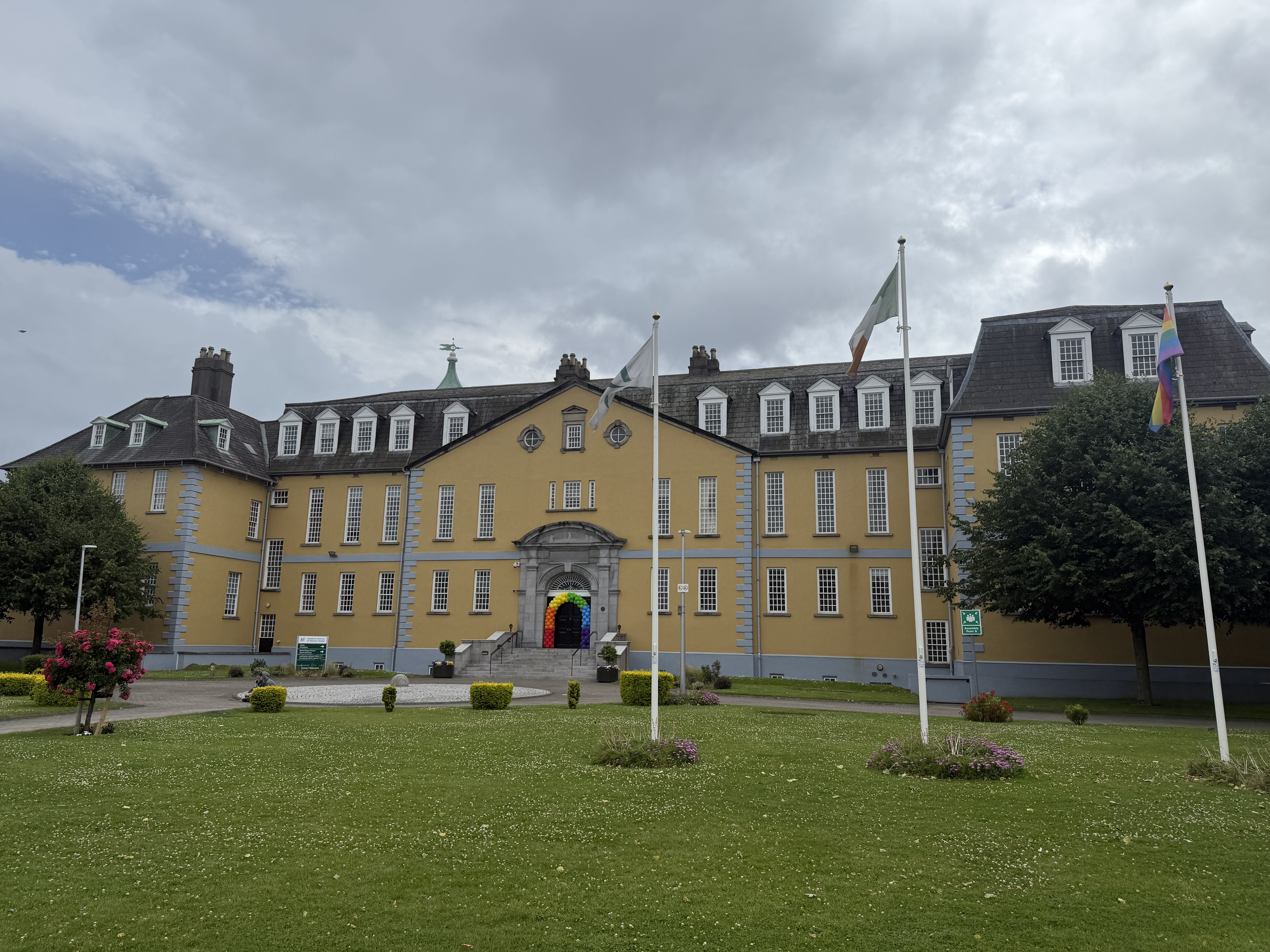

- Location within Central Dublin

General information
- Classification: General Hospital
- Location: Steeven's Lane, Kilmainham, Ireland
- Coordinates: 53°20′43″N 6°17′32″W
- Current tenants: Health Service Executive
- Construction started: 1719
- Estimated completion: 1733
- Renovated: 1743 (apartments and library added)
- Cost: £16,000

Design and construction
- Architects: Thomas Burgh and Francis Quin (1719-32)
- Other designers: Isaac Wills (carpenter) (1719-32)
- Quantity surveyor: Michael Wills (clerk of works and accountant)
- Main contractor: Moses Darley (stonecutter) and William Darley (1719-33); Francis Godfrey (1743) - Worth library and apartments

Dr Steevens' Hospital (also called Dr Steevens's Hospital) (Irish: Ospidéal an Dr Steevens), one of Ireland's most distinguished eighteenth-century medical establishments, was located at Kilmainham in Dublin Ireland. It was founded under the terms of the will of Richard Steevens, an eminent physician in Dublin. The seal of the hospital consisted of 'The Good Samaritan healing the wounds of the fallen traveller' with the motto beneath "Do Thou Likewise".

The hospital closed in 1987 and subsequently became the administrative headquarters of the Health Service Executive (HSE).

== History ==
=== Background ===
As the population grew in Dublin city in the 1600s, there was no organised system to also care for the growing numbers of sick and disabled inhabitants. Many of them lived in miserable conditions and had to compete with able-bodied beggars whose numbers grew considerably when rural workers migrated to the city during periods of crop failure. In 1699, Doctor Thomas Molyneaux approached Dublin Corporation with a proposal to build a hospital, using the sum of £2,000 which had been gifted by an anonymous donor for that purpose.

Molyneaux was already a fellow of the College of Physicians at this stage, and subsequently became its president in 1701. His proposal ultimately failed however, but may have motivated Richard Steevens, who succeeded Molyneux as president of the College in 1703, to bequeath his estate to found a hospital. Steevens had studied medicine, spent some time in Leiden, and upon returning to Dublin had established a very successful medical practice, accumulating great wealth in the process. He was appointed Professor of Medicine at Trinity College in September 1710 but died relatively soon afterwards on 15 December 1710.

=== Foundation and design ===
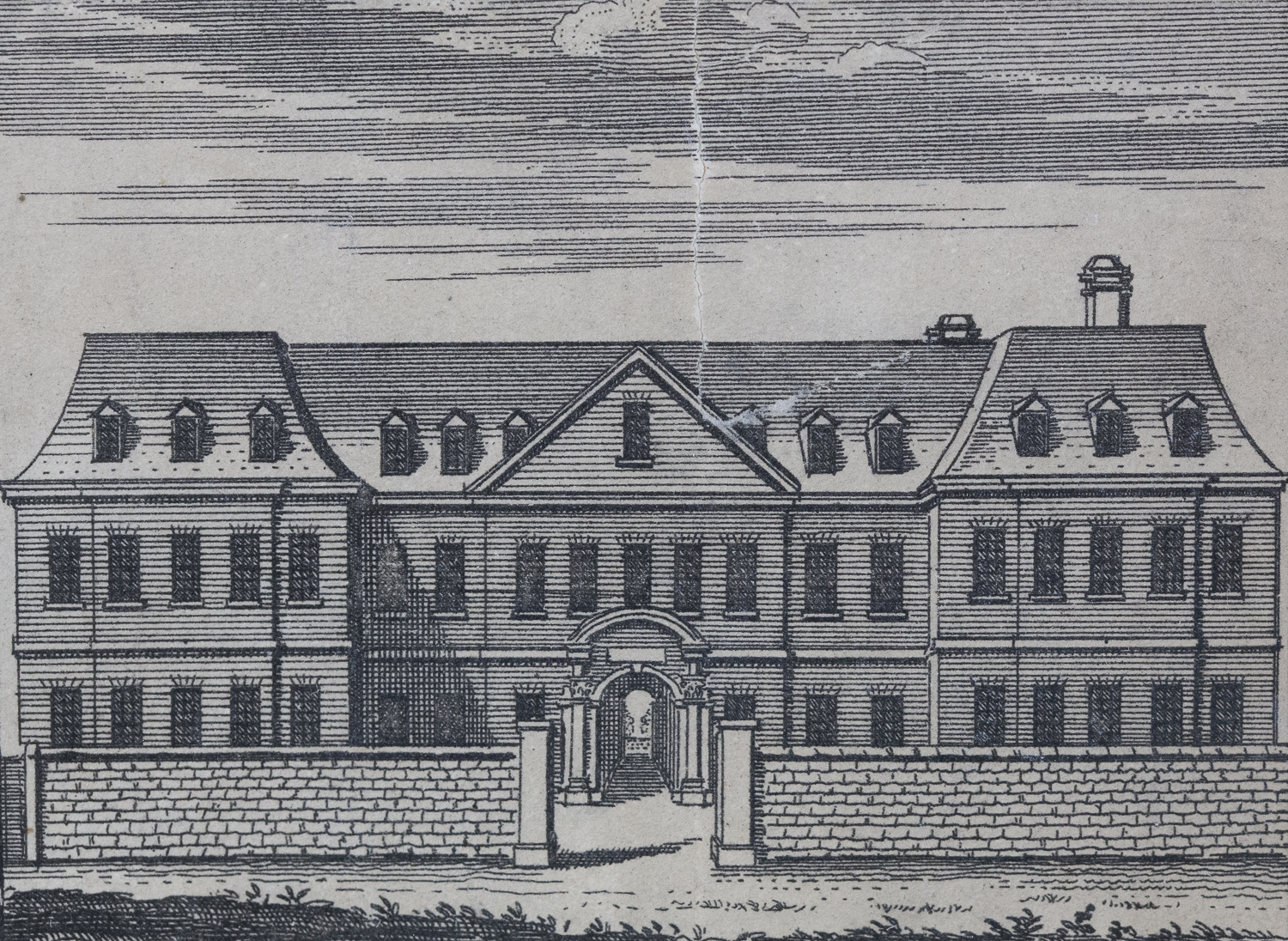
An illustration of the hospital taken from Charles Brooking's map of Dublin (1728).

Steevens stipulated in his will that his unmarried sister Madame Grizell Steevens was to have the benefit of his property during her lifetime. The income was from an estate in County Westmeath and King's County which gave her £600 per annum for her life. After her death, the proceeds were to be used by nominated trustees to "build or cause to be built or otherwise provide one proper Place or Building within the City of Dublin for an Hospitall for maintaining and curing from time to time such sick and wounded persons whose Distempers and Wounds are curable".

Grizell was 56 when her brother died and she decided that his plan for a hospital should be implemented as soon as possible rather than waiting until her death. Her brother's personal friend and trustee, Thomas Proby, who was surgeon-general of the army at the time, encouraged her in this regard. One condition that she attached to her donation, however, was that she should be allowed to live there, which she did for the rest of her life, living in a room at the front of the hospital until her death at the age of 93. In August 1717, she executed a deed appointing 14 trustees to begin the planning and building of the hospital and gave them £2,000 for the purpose. A fortnight later, the trustees met for the first time and agreed to purchase about three and a half acres of land lying at the end of James's Street for £600. The land was delineated in a survey carried out by Gabriel Stokes, great-grandfather of the famous physician William Stokes. It was considered ideal as a site for a hospital, situated as it was on green fields sloping down to the banks of the River Liffey, with fields also separating it from the grounds of the Royal Hospital Kilmainham completed some decades prior.

Thomas Burgh, Surveyor-General of His Majesty's Fortifications in Ireland, was one of the appointed trustees in the project and also assumed the role of architect and superintendent. The stone used in the building of the hospital came from a quarry situated north of the Liffey owned by Thomas Proby. The material was supplied by Proby without cost, the only charge being for transportation. Burgh similarly planned and supervised the building of the hospital without fee or reward.

Burgh's plans for the hospital were influenced by the architecture of late-seventeenth-century English houses such as Clarendon House and also the design of the Royal Hospital Kilmainham, which was built in the 1680s as a home for old and disabled soldiers. The courtyard plan was commonly used in the design of seventeenth-century European hospitals such as St Thomas' Hospital. The arches of the courtyard form a sort of cloister all around, with peculiar attic windows that cut across the intersection of the roofs at each corner.

One of the first priorities of the trustees was to build a road, now known as Steeven's Lane (Irish: Lána Steevens), running downhill from James's Street to the site. The trustees continued the road to the river across land which they acquired on lease from Henry Temple, 1st Viscount Palmerston. However, they did not obtain Temple's formal agreement to this arrangement and when the lease expired, the governors of the hospital found themselves involved in an expensive legal action.

The trustees also successfully petitioned Dublin Corporation for permission to establish a ferry across the river at the end of the lane, which remained a steady source of income for the hospital throughout the eighteenth century. The site of the ferry can be seen marked on John Rocque's 1756 map, "An Exact Survey of the City and Suburbs of Dublin". The ferry finally ceased to function after the construction of King's Bridge, now named Seán Heuston Bridge, in 1827.

=== Madam Steevens ===
Steevens was often to be seen walking the grounds closely veiled, which led to speculation among the local Dublin populace, that she had a face like the snout of a pig, and that for the shame she would not let it be seen. This unpleasant appearance was said to be the result of a curse consequent to a petulant and unfeeling remark made by Steevens' mother when pestered by the importunities of a beggar woman, with a baby at her breast, and a tribe of children at her heels. Mrs. Steevens' said "Get away, you are like an old sow, with a litter of bonhams". The beggar retorted with the wish that the lady's next child might be like the animal to which she had been compared. Grizell often sat at a window in the hospital; some stories suggested she hid her face behind a curtain; others that she sat in full public view in order to show that her face was perfectly normal. According to Malcolm, Dubliners "always called it" Madam Steevens Hospital as a result.

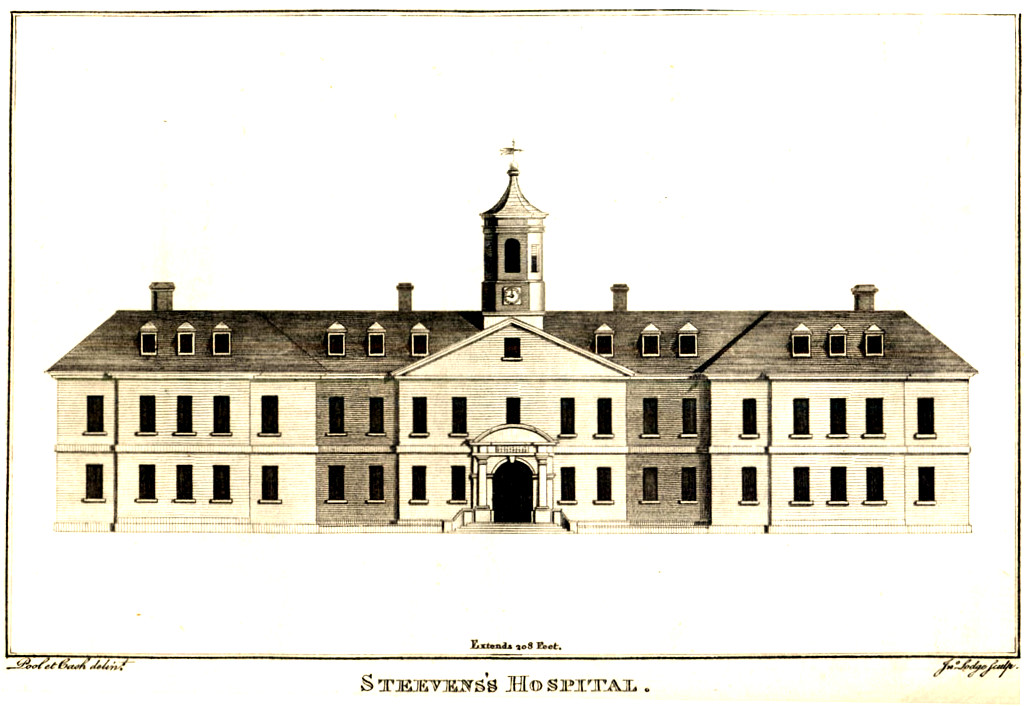
Dr. Steevens' Hospital in 1780

=== Edward Worth Library ===
In 1732, Edward Worth, one of the most eminent Dublin physicians of his day, died and bequeathed to Steevens' Hospital £1,000 and his library, then valued at £5,000, together with £100 for fitting it up. The hospital built a specially designed room to house the Edward Worth Library, where it remains to this day under updated protective conditions. The bookshelves, panelling, wainscotting and Corinthian columns in the library were constructed by the carpenter Hugh Wilson while the glazing was carried out by Francis Godfrey.

=== 19th century and beyond ===
In 1803, in the run-up to Robert Emmet's rebellion, the victims of a powerful explosion at his ammunition depot in Patrick Street were brought to the hospital. They included Darby Byrne and one of the Keenans, who were blown up at the time of the explosion and died in the hospital afterwards.

In 1857 the Dublin School of Medicine was transferred to Dr. Steevens' Hospital and renamed Steevens' Hospital Medical College. The hospital closed in 1987 and subsequently became the administrative headquarters of the Health Service Executive.

Four soldiers from the Royal Irish Regiment are buried alongside two Irish Volunteers in the hospital grounds, all casualties of the 1916 Easter Rising.

== Contemporary hospitals ==
The most startling growth in new institutions in Dublin during the first half of the eighteenth century was in the provision of hospitals. In 1718, a house was opened in Cook Street by six surgeons for 'the maimed and wounded poor'; called the Charitable Infirmary in 1728, it eventually became Jervis Street Hospital. After some twenty years of planning, Dr Steevens Hospital was finally opened in 1733, to be followed shortly afterwards by Mercer's in 1734, by the hospital for incurables in 1744, by the Lying-in Hospital or Rotunda in 1745 and by the Meath Hospital in 1753. Thus, six hospitals were established in little over thirty years, followed by a seventh, Jonathan Swift's St. Patrick's Hospital for Imbeciles, which opened in 1757 on land adjacent to, and leased from, Dr Steevens' Hospital.

== Records ==
The hospital records are preserved and contain many curious entries, among others one as to the daily diet of a patient. The patient received around two quarts of small beer with his meals, because before tea and coffee came into general use, beer was almost the only alternative to water (which was often unclean). In recognition of this tradition, in the last days of the hospital operating as a hospital, Messrs. Arthur Guinness (a neighbour) provided Guinness beer in 1/3 pint bottles for all the patients and staff.

== Notable physicians ==
Notable physicians included:

- Sir Charles Cameron, appointed lecturer in chemistry and physics at the medical school in the hospital in 1857; subsequently became Chief Medical Officer for Dublin.
- Samuel Clossy, at the invitation of Dr William Stephens conducted autopsies at the Hospital, knowledge from which he published in his Observations on some of the diseases of the parts of the body; chiefly taken from the dissection of morbid bodies (1763).
- Abraham Colles (1773-1843), appointed as physician to the hospital in 1799 and remained there for 42 years.
- Sir Peter Freyer spent some time at the hospital as a resident pupil before graduating and setting off to join the Indian Medical Service.
- Thomas Percy Claude Kirkpatrick (1869-1954), appointed assistant physician at the hospital; subsequently registrar of the Royal College of Physicians of Ireland.
- Sir Henry Marsh, appointed physician at the hospital in 1820.
- Dr. Thomas Proby (1661-1729), a native of Dublin, appointed physician at the time of the foundation of the hospital.
- Edward Worth was a governor of the hospital and left his library to it.

== See also ==
- St Patrick's University Hospital, a neighbouring psychiatric hospital founded in 1747 and finally opened to patients in 1757

== Sources ==
- Coakley, Davis (1992). Doctor Steevens' Hospital: A Brief History. Dublin: Doctor Steevens' Hospital Historical Centre. ISBN 0-9519822-0-6.
- Malcolm, Elizabeth (1989). Swift's Hospital: A History of St. Patrick's Hospital, Dublin, 1746-1989. Dublin: Gill and Macmillan. ISBN 0-7171-1501-1.
