= Pig-faced women =

Legend originating in Holland, England, and France

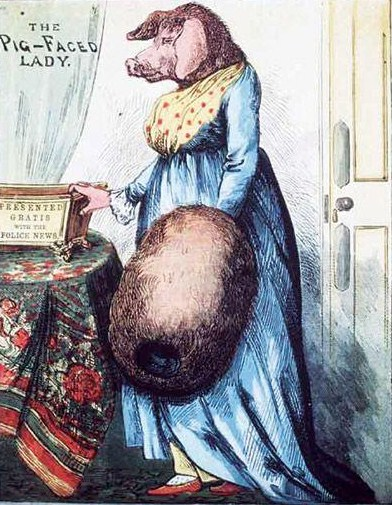
An 1882 print of a pig-faced woman, from The Illustrated Police News

Legends featuring pig-faced women originated roughly simultaneously in the Netherlands, England and France in the late 1630s. The stories tell of a wealthy woman whose body is of normal human appearance, but whose face is that of a pig.

In the earliest forms of the story, the woman's pig-like appearance is the result of witchcraft. Following her wedding day, the pig-faced woman's new husband is granted the choice of having her appear beautiful to him but pig-like to others, or pig-like to him and beautiful to others. When her husband tells her that the choice is hers, the enchantment is broken and her pig-like appearance vanishes. These stories became particularly popular in England, and later in Ireland.

The magical elements gradually vanished from the story, and the existence of pig-faced women began to be treated as fact. The story became particularly widespread in Dublin in the early 19th century, where it became widely believed that reclusive 18th-century philanthropist Griselda Steevens had kept herself hidden from view because she had the face of a pig. In late 1814 and early 1815, rumour swept London that a pig-faced woman was living in Marylebone. Her existence was widely reported as fact, and numerous alleged portraits of her were published. With belief in pig-faced women commonplace, showmen exhibited living "pig-faced women" at fairs. These may have not been genuine women, but shaven bears dressed in women's clothing.

Belief in pig-faced women declined, and the last significant work to treat their existence as genuine was published in 1924. Today, the legend is almost forgotten.

== Standard elements ==
While stories of pig-faced women vary in detail, they have the same basic form. A pregnant noblewoman is approached by a beggar and her children, whom she dismisses, making some comparison of the beggar's children to pigs as she does so. The beggar curses the pregnant noblewoman, and come the birth of her child it is a girl, healthy and perfectly formed in every respect other than having the face of a pig.

The child grows up healthy, but with some of the behaviours of a pig. She eats from a silver trough, and speaks only in grunts or with a grunting sound to her speech. The only child of her parents, she stands to inherit a large fortune, but her parents are concerned about what would become of her after their death. They either make arrangements to find a man willing to marry her, or to use their fortune to endow a hospital on condition that the hospital take care of her for the remainder of her life.

Although originating roughly simultaneously in Holland, England, and France, it was only in England, and later in Ireland, that the legend became well known and widely believed. In 1861 Charles Dickens remarked on the longevity of the belief in pig-faced women in England, commenting that "In every age, I suppose, there has been a pig-faced lady."

== Origins ==
While earlier stories of humans with the appearance of animals are common, prior to the 17th century there are no recorded European stories of humans with the faces of pigs. (An 1829 paper in the Quarterly Journal of Science, Literature, and the Arts claims that the legend was circulating in Paris in 1595 but offers no detail or corroborating evidence.) The earliest versions of the story of the pig-faced woman appear to have originated roughly simultaneously in England, Holland and France, and to have become prevalent in England in late 1639. A 1904 paper in Volkskunde by Dutch folklorist Gerrit Jacob Boekenoogen traces the earliest forms of the legend as appearing in 1638 or 1639.

The earliest surviving version of the legend is a Dutch print about an Amsterdam woman named Jacamijntjen Jacobs. In 1621 Jacobs, while pregnant, was approached one day by a female beggar accompanied by three children, who pleaded that her children were starving. Jacobs told the beggar, "Take away your filthy pigs, I will not give you anything." The woman replied "Are these my children pigs? May God then give you such pigs as I have here!" Jacobs' daughter was born with the head and face of a pig, and, at the time of publication in 1638–39, the daughter supposedly ate from a trough and spoke in a grunting voice.

Bondeson (2006) speculates that the pig-faced woman myth originated as a fusion of two earlier stories. The mediaeval Dutch legend of Margaret of Henneberg tells of a wealthy noblewoman who turned away a beggar with twins, and was herself punished by giving birth to 365 children. In a similar French folk tale, the noblewoman in question described the beggar's children as "piglets", and gave birth to a litter of nine piglets.

The other significant theory about the origin of the legend, proposed by Robert Chambers in 1864, is that a genuine child was born in the early 17th century with facial deformities resembling a pig's face and a speech impediment causing her to grunt. The science of teratology (the study of birth defects and physiological abnormalities) was then in its infancy, and the theory of maternal impression (that the thoughts of a pregnant woman could influence the future appearance of her children) was widely accepted. It is possible that the birth of a genuinely deformed child led to the story of the beggar as a possible explanation for her appearance, with other elements of the story being later additions or distortions by publishers. Chambers speculates that the original child may have had a similar appearance to Julia Pastrana, a woman with hypertrichosis and distorted (although not pig-like) facial features, who was widely exhibited in Europe and North America until her death in 1860, and then, embalmed, until the 1970s. However, while a 1952 stillbirth with a face resembling a pig is documented, there has never been a reliably documented case of a human with deformities of this kind surviving outside the womb, while all versions of the pig-faced woman legend describe her as a healthy adult.

=== Tannakin Skinker ===
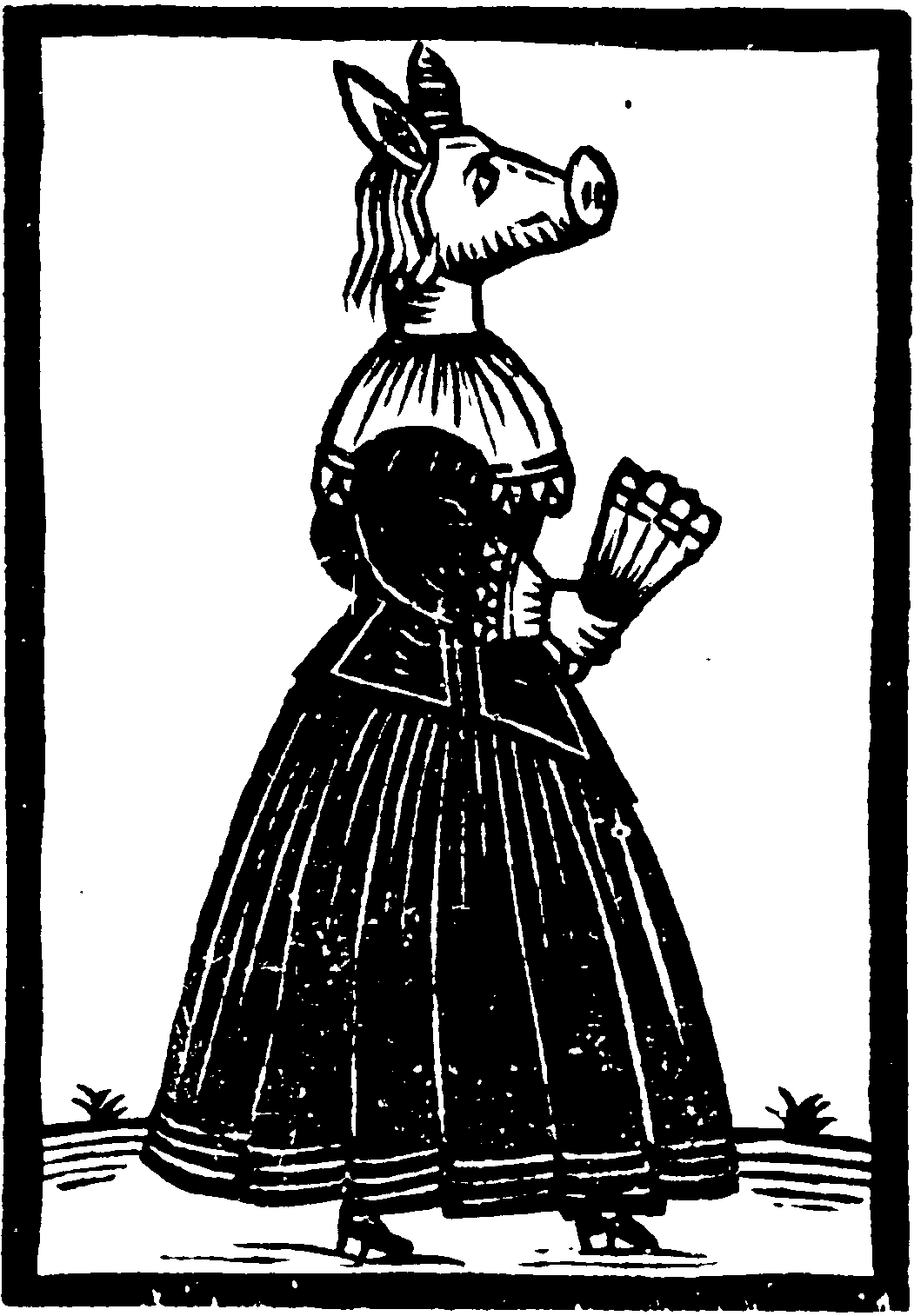
Tannakin Skinker, from A Monstrous Shape, or a Shapelesse Monster, 1640

The first recorded reference in England to the legend of the pig-faced woman is the fable of Tannakin Skinker, a 17th-century variation on the traditional loathly lady story, in particular on The Wife of Bath's Tale and The Marriage of Sir Gawain. The Skinker story is generally considered the basis for later English stories of pig-faced women. Between 4 and 11 December 1639, five ballads about Skinker were published in London, (Note: The Woman Monster, A Maiden Monster, A Strange Relation of a Female Monster, A New Ballad of the Swines-faced Gentlewoman and A Wonder of These Times.) all of which are now lost. (A 1640 ballad, A Monstrous Shape: or, A Shapelesse Monster, a Description of a female creature born in Holland compleat in every part, save only a head like a swine, who hath travelled in many parts and is now to be seen in London, shees loving, courteous and effeminate and nere as yet could find a loving mate, is preserved in Samuel Pepys's extensive collection of ballads.) The earliest surviving record of the Tannakin Skinker story is that given in A Certaine Relation of the Hog-faced Gentlewoman called Mistris Tannakin Skinker, a 1640 chapbook.

==== A Certaine Relation of the Hog-faced Gentlewoman called Mistris Tannakin Skinker ====
A Certaine Relation claims that Tannakin Skinker was born to Joachim and Parnel Skinker in 1618 in "Wirkham, a neuter towne betweene the Emperour and the Hollander, scituate on the river Rhyne". (Note: "The Emperour" refers to the Holy Roman Empire, roughly modern Germany. No town called "Wirkham" exists on or near the Rhine. The Netherlands and Britain were at war for much of this period; the Dutch translation of A Certaine Relation gives Skinker's birthplace as "Windsor, on the Thames".) Joachim Skinker is described as "a man of good revenue, but of a great estate in money and cattle." During Parnel's pregnancy, an elderly woman had begged her for money. Parnel was busy and refused to pay, and the old woman had left, "muttering to her selfe the Divells pater noster, and was heard to say 'As the Mother is Hoggish, so Swinish shall be the Child shee goeth withall'". At Tannakin's birth her body and limbs were correctly proportioned, but her face had a pig's snout, "not only a stain and blemish, but a deformed uglinesse, making all the rest loathsome, contemptible and odious to all that lookt upon her in her infancie." The midwife who had delivered the baby was sworn to secrecy, and the Skinkers raised her in a private room. She ate from a silver trough, "to which she stooped and ate, just like a Swine doth in his swilling tub".

Tannakin's deformity was soon discovered, and many locals came to hear her pig-like speech or to watch her feed from the trough. The old woman was located, tried and convicted for witchcraft, but even at the stake refused or was unable to reverse the enchantment.

When Tannakin was between 16 and 17 years old, her father consulted Vandermast, "a famous Artist, who was both a Mathematician, and an Astrologian [...] a man who was suspected to have been well versed in blacke and hidden Arts", as to how the curse might be undone. (Note: "Vandermast" was also the name of the fictional German magician created by Robert Greene in around 1590, a rival to Friar Bacon in Friar Bacon and Friar Bungay.) Vandermast concluded that as long as Tannakin remained a virgin she would retain her pig's face, but were she married, and not to "a Clowne, Bore or Pesant", she might be cured.

One thinkes to him selfe, so the body bee handsome, though her countenance be never so coarse and ugly, all are alike in the night; and in the day time, put her head but in a blacke bagge, and what difference betwixt her and another woman? Another comforteth him selfe thus: That if shee cannot speake, shee cannot chide; and therefore hee shall be sure not to have a scold to his wife.

— A Certaine Relation

The Skinker family announced that any gentleman who "would take her to his bed after loyall Matrimony" would receive a dowry of £40,000. The dowry, a huge sum for the time, prompted a large number of would-be husbands. A Scottish captain arrived, having spent the greater part of a month's pay on a new suit, and was taken by Tannakin's figure and deportment. On lifting the veil to view her face, however, "hee would stay no other conference, but ran away without further answer, saying; they must pardon him, for hee could indure no Porke." An English sow-man (pig farmer) assured the family that his familiarity with pigs meant he would accept Tannakin's appearance, but after meeting her he left the building, saying that "so long as I have known Rumford, I never saw such a Hogsnout". (Note: Bondeson (2006) interprets the original "sow-man" as "sowce-man", from "sowce", an archaic English term for pickled pig's ears and trotters.)

Several further would-be suitors visited the Skinkers, but all were repulsed by Tannakin's face and she remained unmarried. Despairing of finding a suitable husband in Wirkham, the Skinker family moved to London, and took up residence in either Blackfriars or Covent Garden. (The anonymous author of A Certaine Relation says that the family did not wish to divulge their address, to discourage curiosity-seekers from gathering.) Many who met her were taken by her elegant dress and excellent demeanour.

Eventually, the Skinkers found a man in London willing to marry Tannakin. On the day of the wedding, and despite all efforts to improve her appearance, her face was as pig-like as ever. With the wedding service concluded, the newly-wed couple retired to the bedroom. When they lay in bed together for the first time, Tannakin reached for her husband's arm, saying that she would release him from his vows provided that he would look at her in the face. He turned to look at her, and saw "a sweet young Lady of incomparable beauty and feature, the like to whom to his imagination he never had in his whole life time beheld". He reached to kiss her, but she refused, saying:

Sir, I am indeed no other than I now seeme unto you; and of these two things I give you free choice, whether I shall appeare to you thus as you now see me, young, faire, and lovely in your bed, and all the daytime, and abroad, of my former deformity: or thus beautifull in the day, to the sight of your friends, but in your armes every night of my former Age and Uglinesse: of these two things I give you free choice of, which till you have resolv'd me, there can be no other familiarity betwixt in: therefore without pause give me a speedy answer.

Tannakin Skinker and a suitor, from A Certaine Relation, 1640

Torn between the choice of a wife who would appear beautiful to him but hideous to all his friends, or hideous to him but beautiful to all his friends, he could not reach a decision but instead said to her "into you owne hands and choyse I give the full power and soveraignty to make election of which you best please." On hearing this, Tannakin turned to him and said:

Now Sir, you have given me that which all women most desire, my Will, and Soveraignty; and know I, was by a wicked and sorcerous step-dame inchanted, never to returne to my pristine shape, till I was first married, and after had received such power from my Husband · And now from henceforth I shall be the same to you night and day, of that youth and lively-hood which you now see mee; till Time and Age breed new alteration, even to the last period of my life.

==== Public reaction ====
The fable of Tannakin Skinker was popular in England, and the idea of the pig-faced woman soon entered popular culture, to the extent that by 1654, it was recorded that one of the signs at Bartholomew Fair was "the Signe of the Hoggs-fac'd Gentlewoman". By the 1670s, The Long-Nos'd Lass was a popular song, relating in detail how a tailor and a miller courted a woman whose "visage was perfectly just like a Sow" in the hope of securing her dowry (given as £17,000, not the £40,000 of A Certaine Relation). On seeing her face each turned and fled. The Long-Nos'd Lass does not contain the magical elements of A Certaine Relation, nor end in the wedding and the transformation of the pig-faced woman, the traditional ending of stories in the genre. Instead, the pig-faced woman remains unmarried, and the ballad ends:

Both Tinkers and Tanners and Glovers also
Came to her, the Money encouraged them so
Nay, thousands came to her then every day,
Each striving to carry this Beauty away
But when they beheld this most ordinary stuff.
The sight of her Visage did give them enuff;
Yet if she be Marry'd while here she does live,
A perfect account of the Wedding I'le give.

== 18th century ==
This Monster was a Gentlewoman of a good family and fortune, very tall and well-proportioned, of a very fine fair white skin, black hair on her head and eyebrows, but her face perfectly shaped like that of a hog or sow, except that it was not hairy; when she went abroad she covered her face with a large black velvet mask: she had a grunting voise like that of a hog, very disagreeable, but spoke very distinctly: she lived in St. Andrew's Parish in Holborn, London.

— A Woman with a Hog's Face, James Paris du Plessis

In the 18th century, stories of pig-faced women began to be reported as fact in England. James Paris du Plessis, former servant to Samuel Pepys, told in his Short History of Human Prodigious & Monstrous Births (compiled 1731–1733) of a pig-faced woman living in Holborn in central London, which was widely reprinted. An 1850 article in Chambers's Edinburgh Journal carried the recollections of "a venerable and clear-headed old lady of ninety", in which she recounted that her mother was well acquainted with a pig-faced woman, of Scottish birth but living in London, and would regularly visit her home in Sloane Street. In 1800, The Pig-faced Lady, as "sung at Astley's Theatre, &c.", was published in London by John Pitts, and an 1815 editorial in The Times recounted reports of a pig-faced woman living in London as having circulated in 1764 and in the 1780s.

=== Daughter of a Jewish convert ===
A variant form of the legend, and the only one in which the pig-faced woman is not connected with a great fortune, told of a Christian man who converted to Judaism. In this version, the first child born to him after his conversion was a girl with the face of a pig. Some years later, the father realised that his daughter's appearance was a divine punishment, and re-converted to Christianity along with his pig-faced daughter. At the moment of the daughter's baptism, the holy water washed her pig-like features away, revealing a normal human face. The story was alleged to be represented by a sculpture in "one of the grand old cathedrals of Belgium", but no evidence for such a sculpture has been found.

=== Griselda Steevens ===
Griselda Steevens (1653 – 18 March 1746), sometimes written as "Grizel Steevens", was the twin sister of Dr Richard Steevens (1653–1710), a Dublin physician. Dr Steevens died in 1710, bequeathing an estate with an income of £606 (equivalent to £89,000 in 2025) per year to Griselda. A clause in Dr Steevens' will stipulated that on Griselda's death, the income was to be used to provide a hospital for the poor of Dublin.

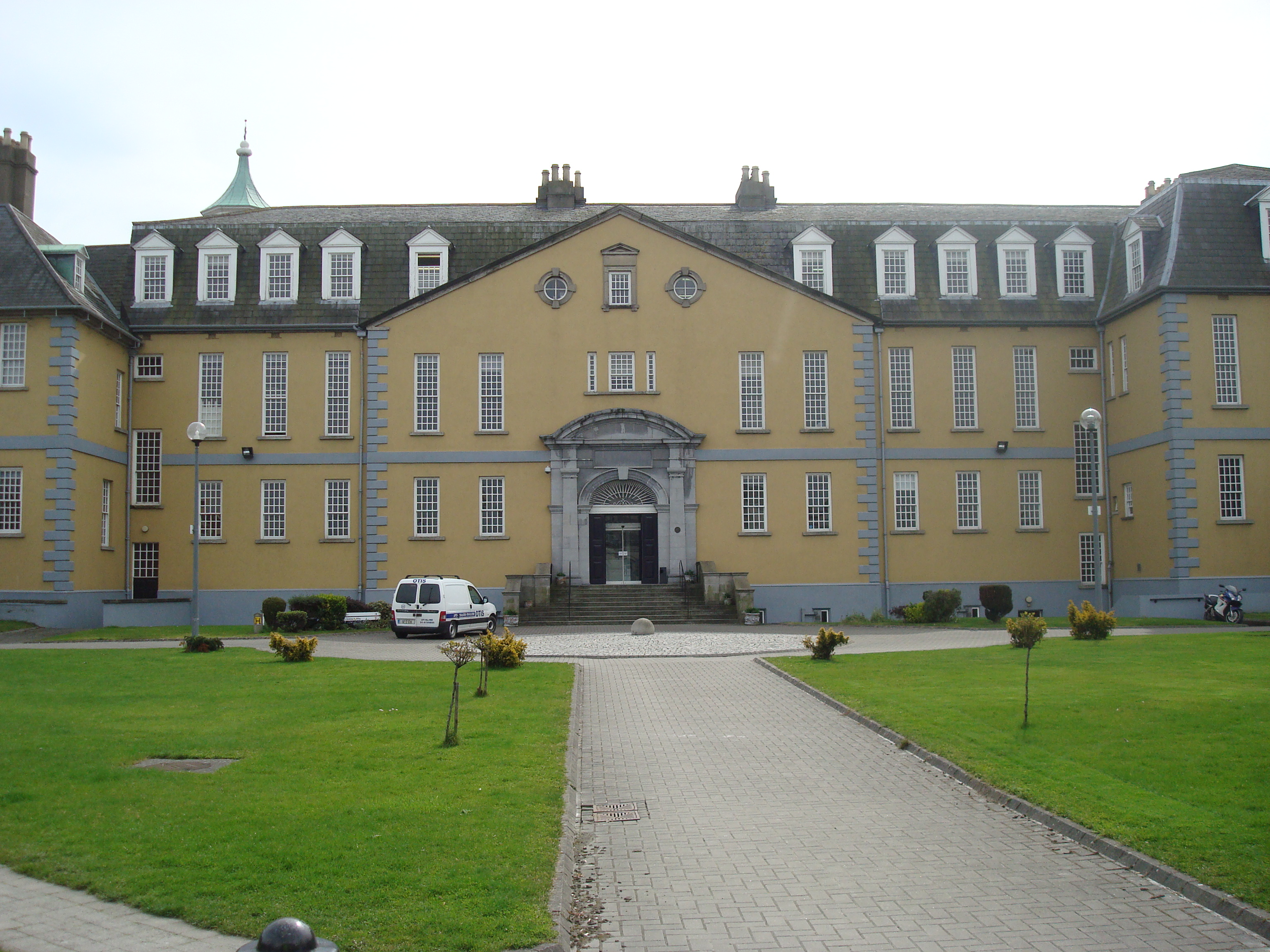
Dr Steevens' Hospital

Although the terms of Dr Steevens' will were that work on the hospital would not begin until after Griselda Steevens' death, she decided to begin work on the hospital in 1720. Reserving only £120 per year for her own use, she used the remaining funds to buy a plot of land near Kilmainham and to build the new hospital, with the sole condition being that she be granted a suite of apartments in the building. As a youth Griselda had suffered a disorder of the eyes, and since then had worn a veil while in sunlight. Shy and reclusive, while conducting her charitable works in the Dublin slums she would remain in her carriage while servants gave out alms to the poor. By 1723 a sufficient portion of the new Dr Steevens' Hospital was completed to accommodate 40 patients, in addition to Griselda's apartments. The remainder of the hospital, with space for 200 patients, opened in 1733. Griselda lived in the hospital from 1723 until her death.

At some point, it became a common belief in Dublin that Griselda Steevens had a pig's face. It is unclear when the rumour arose. Robert Chambers and Irish Georgian Society founder Desmond Guinness claim that the rumour was current in her lifetime, but Thomas Kirkpatrick, author of History of Dr Steevens' Hospital Dublin, says that

There is absolutely no evidence of this story in contemporary records, nor indeed does it appear to have been connected with the good lady until the nineteenth century ... It is not quite certain when this story first gained circulation. Croker-King, who wrote a history of the hospital in 1785, makes no mention of it, nor is there any suggestion of it in the newspaper accounts of the death of Madam Steevens, or the published account of the hospital in the eighteenth century.

The rumour was that Griselda Steevens' reclusiveness and always being veiled were owing to her having been born with a pig's head. Chambers (1864) speculates that her unusual name may have contributed to the legend, and notes the common belief that she was named "Grisly" on account of her appearance when born. It was claimed that while pregnant with Richard and Griselda, Steevens' mother had said "take away your litter of pigs!" to a woman beggar asking for money to feed her children, and Griselda had then been born with the head and face of a pig. Dismayed by the popular belief that she had a pig's head, Griselda took to sitting on an open balcony to allow the public to see her face. This failed to stem the spread of the rumour, and she commissioned a portrait of herself to be hung in the main hall of the hospital. The portrait failed to have the desired effect; many of the public chose instead to believe a portrait in a pub neighbouring the hospital, which showed Steevens with a pig's head; the pub also displayed a silver trough alleged to have belonged to her. She eventually withdrew from public view completely before her death on 18 March 1746.

Surgeon and historian William Wilde recollected that as a medical student at Dr Steevens' Hospital in 1832 he was shown a silver trough, alleged to have belonged to Griselda Steevens, and accounts suggest that in the early 19th century a plaster cast of a human face with a pig's snout was on display at the hospital. Although the hospital authorities later forbade the display of alleged Steevens memorabilia on pain of dismissal, in the later half of the 19th century the belief that Steevens had a pig's face remained common. In the 1860s, a Dublin woman recollected that in her youth a large silver punchbowl, embossed with a family crest of a boar's head, was shown to visitors and was claimed to have been the Pig-faced Lady's trough.

== The Pig-faced Lady of Manchester Square ==
In late 1814 and early 1815, a rumour swept London that a pig-faced woman was living in Marylebone, an inner-city area of central London. Said to be the daughter of an unspecified noblewoman, she was supposedly young, wealthy and living in fashionable Manchester Square. In some reports she was described as the daughter of a noblewoman from Grosvenor Square. It was claimed that she would occasionally venture out of the house in a carriage, hidden by a heavy veil; several letters to the London newspapers reported sightings of a snout protruding from a window, or a veiled, silhouetted pig's head in a passing carriage.

For the attention of GENTLEMEN and LADIES. – A young Gentlewoman having heard of an advertisement for a person to undertake the care of a Lady who is heavily afflicted in the face, whose friends have offered a handsome income yearly, and a premium for residing with her 7 years, would do all in her power to render her life most comfortable, and undeniable character can be obtained, from a respectable circle of friends: an answer to this advertisement is requested, as the advertiser will keep herself disengaged. Address, post paid, to X. Y. at Mr. Ford's, baker, 12 Judd-street, Brunswick-square.

— Advertisement in The Times, 9 February 1815

In early 1815 the first of many portraits of the Pig-faced Lady of Manchester Square was published. This included a brief biography, allegedly from "a female who attended on her". It claimed that the Pig-faced Lady was Irish and aged about 20, from a wealthy family, and that "on her life and issue by marriage a very large property depends". She was alleged to eat from a silver trough, and to speak only in grunts. It claimed that her attendant, although paid an annual salary of 1,000 guineas (equivalent to £81,000 in 2025), had been too frightened to continue working for her and had resigned, giving her story to the press.

The Pig-faced Lady of Manchester Square became a leading topic of conversation in London. She soon began to be reported in newspapers as fact, and thousands of people believed in her existence. On 9 February 1815 an advertisement appeared in the Times from a self-described "young Gentlewoman", offering to be the Pig-faced Lady's companion in return for "a handsome income yearly, and a premium for residing with her 7 years". The advertisement was published, but a week later a prospective advertisement from a young man wishing to propose marriage to the Pig-faced Lady prompted the Times to denounce the rumour, comparing believers in the Pig-faced Lady to the followers of the (recently deceased) self-proclaimed prophet Joanna Southcott.

There is at present a report, in London, of a woman, with a strangely deformed face, resembling that of a pig, who is possessed of a large fortune, and we suppose wants all the comforts and conveniences incident toward her sex and station. We, ourselves, unwittingly put in an advertisement from a young woman, offering herself to be her companion; and yesterday morning, a fellow (with a calf's head, we suppose) transmitted to us another advertisement, attended by a one pound note, offering himself to be her husband. We have put his offer in the fire, and shall send his money to some charity, thinking it a pity that such a fool should have any. Our rural friends hardly know what idiots London contains. The pig's face is as firmly believed in by many as Joanna Southcot's [sic] pregnancy, to which folly it has succeeded. Though no Parson Tozer has as yet mounted the rostrum to preach in support of the face, there is hardly a company in which this swinish female is not talked of; and thousands believe in her existence. The story, however, is an old one. About 50 years ago, it is well recollected by several elderly people, there was exactly the same rumour. It was revived with but slight effect about 30 years since; and now comes forth again in its pristine vigour. On the original invention of the pig-faced woman, about the year 1764, a man offered himself to make her an ivory trough to feed out of; which can only be considered as a feeble type of the silver cradle actually presented in our day. Besides, there was but one actor in the first folly, and there have been twenty in the latter.

SECRECY. – A single Gentleman, aged thirty-one, of a respectable family, and in whom the utmost confidence may be reposed, is desirous of explaining his mind to the friends of a person who has a misfortune in her face, but is prevented for want of an introduction. Being perfectly aware of the principal particulars, and understanding that a final settlement would be preferred to a temporary one, presumes he would be found to answer to the full extent of their wishes. His intentions are sincere, honourable and firmly resolved. References of great respectability can be given. Address to M. D. at Mr Spencer's, 22 Great Ormond Street, Queen's Square.

— Personal advertisement of February 1815, rejected by the Times but published by the Morning Herald and Morning Chronicle

The Times refused to print the advertisement from the Pig-faced Lady's would-be suitor, and donated his £1 fee to The Marine Society. An anonymous letter-writer to the Times continued the comparison with Joanna Southcott, who had claimed that she would give birth to the Messiah in October 1814, speculating that "the present miss piggy" was perhaps Southcott's child, "brought ... into the world in a state of complete puberty". The letter-writer also ridiculed the "swinish Lothario" who hoped to marry the Pig-faced Lady, suggesting that "if he means to have her, he must woo her in grunts".

With the Times ridiculing belief in the Pig-faced Lady, rival newspapers set out to defend her honour and that of the man who wished to marry her. The Morning Herald and Morning Chronicle both published the advertisement from her prospective suitor. The editor of the Morning Chronicle announced that, in his opinion, the advertisement from the "desperate fortune-hunter" had not been immoral or indecent, and thus in his opinion there was no reason to decline to publish it. He went on to say that while deformities of this nature were unknown to doctors, it was certainly possible that a facially disfigured woman existed and that her deformities had been exaggerated in accounts; he also chided the Times for not returning the payment for the rejected advertisement. The Morning Herald, meanwhile, speculated that the Pig-faced Lady's deformities may have been caused by her mother's "force of imagination, in consequence of a dog having suddenly leaped on her".

Despite the pleas of the Times for scepticism, belief in the Pig-faced Lady of Manchester Square continued to spread in 1815. During illuminations celebrating the end of the Napoleonic Wars a huge crowd gathered around Piccadilly, bringing traffic to a standstill. Eyewitnesses recounted that in a stopped landau a woman with a fashionable bonnet and a pig's snout was visible. The crowd tried to stop the carriage, but the coachman drove through the crowd at high speed. It was later claimed that the coach had been seen to stop in Grosvenor Square; it was presumed that the Pig-faced Lady was the daughter of "a well-known lady of fashion" who lived there.

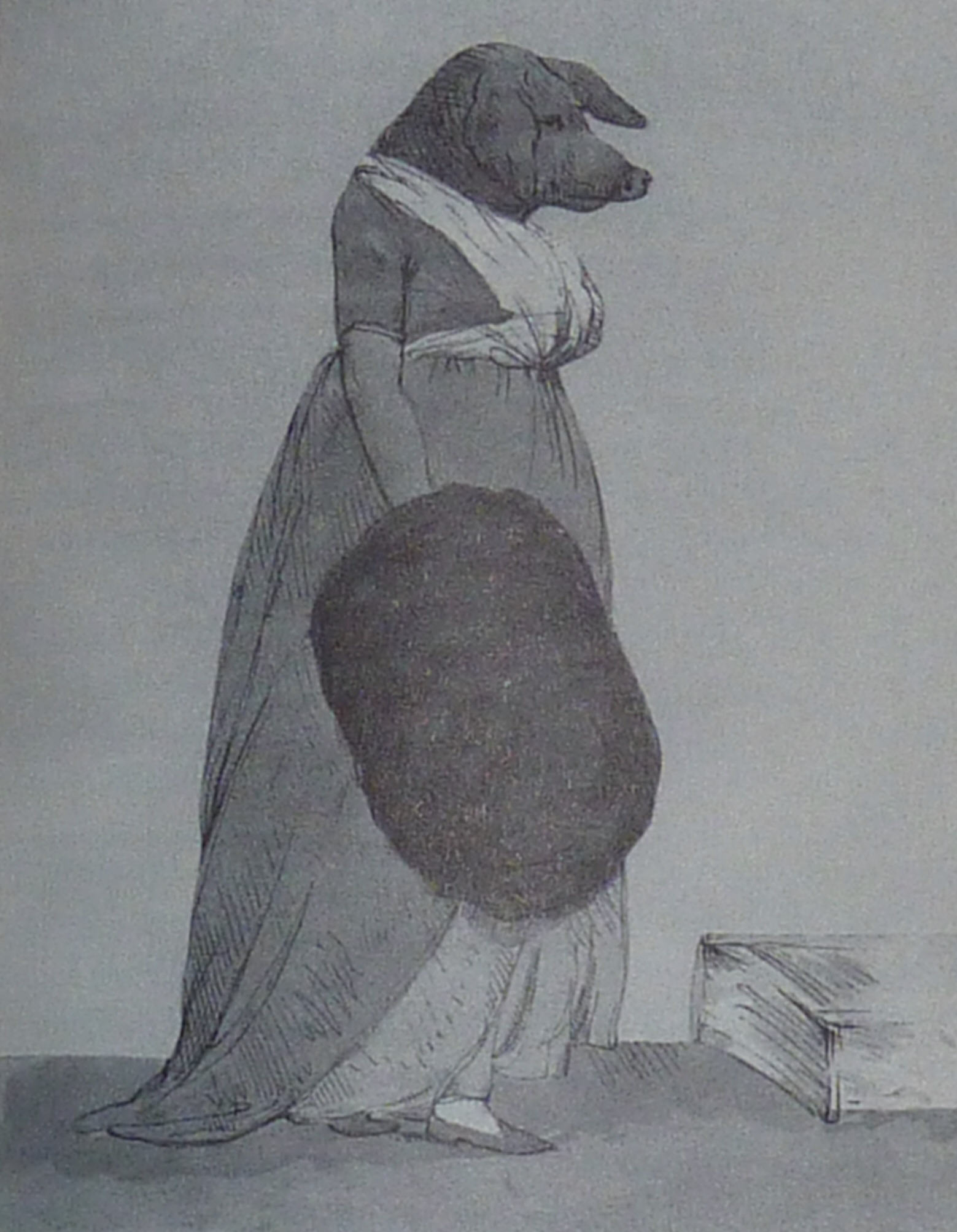
The Wonderful Mrs Atkinson, based on a drawing by George Morland

It was also reported that William Elliot, a young baronet, called to visit a "great lady" at the house in Grosvenor Square in which the Pig-faced Lady was believed to be staying. Taken into the drawing room, he was confronted by a fashionably dressed woman with the face of a pig. Elliot "could not refrain from uttering a shout of horror, and rushed to the door in a manner the reverse of polite". The Pig-faced Lady rushed at Elliot as he left and bit him on the back of the neck; it was claimed that he was badly injured in the attack, requiring treatment by "Hawkins, the surgeon, in St Audley Street". A popular print entitled Beware the pig-sty! depicted the supposed attack on Elliot.

In April 1861, a man signing himself "M. A." wrote to Notes and Queries magazine, asking:

Could you or any of your readers kindly inform me whether there exists any account, medical or biographical, of this person? She lived, I believe, about forty years ago; and I am acquainted with two authentic instances of her having been seen, in one of the two, by a gentleman still living. In spite of the natural horror of the phenomenon, its interest, both physiological and psychological, is so considerable that I am surprised to find so little information afloat upon the subject. May I further ask whether any more recent case of the kind has occurred? There are one or two earlier cases.

In a reply published on 22 June 1861, a Mr F. FitzHenry claimed to have known the Pig-faced Lady's sister, stating that "Lady C. B. lived in Chelsea: her sister, Lady H. W., was much admired as a beauty. I was at a dinner-party forty years ago with Lady H. W., when all the party were cautioned previously not to say a word about pigs, out of delicacy to Lady H. W." In the same issue, a George Lloyd claimed to have seen the Pig-faced Lady in Wakefield in around 1828–29 "but was too young to take a note further than a mental one, which has haunted me ever since".

=== The Pig-faced Lady of Manchester Square in art ===
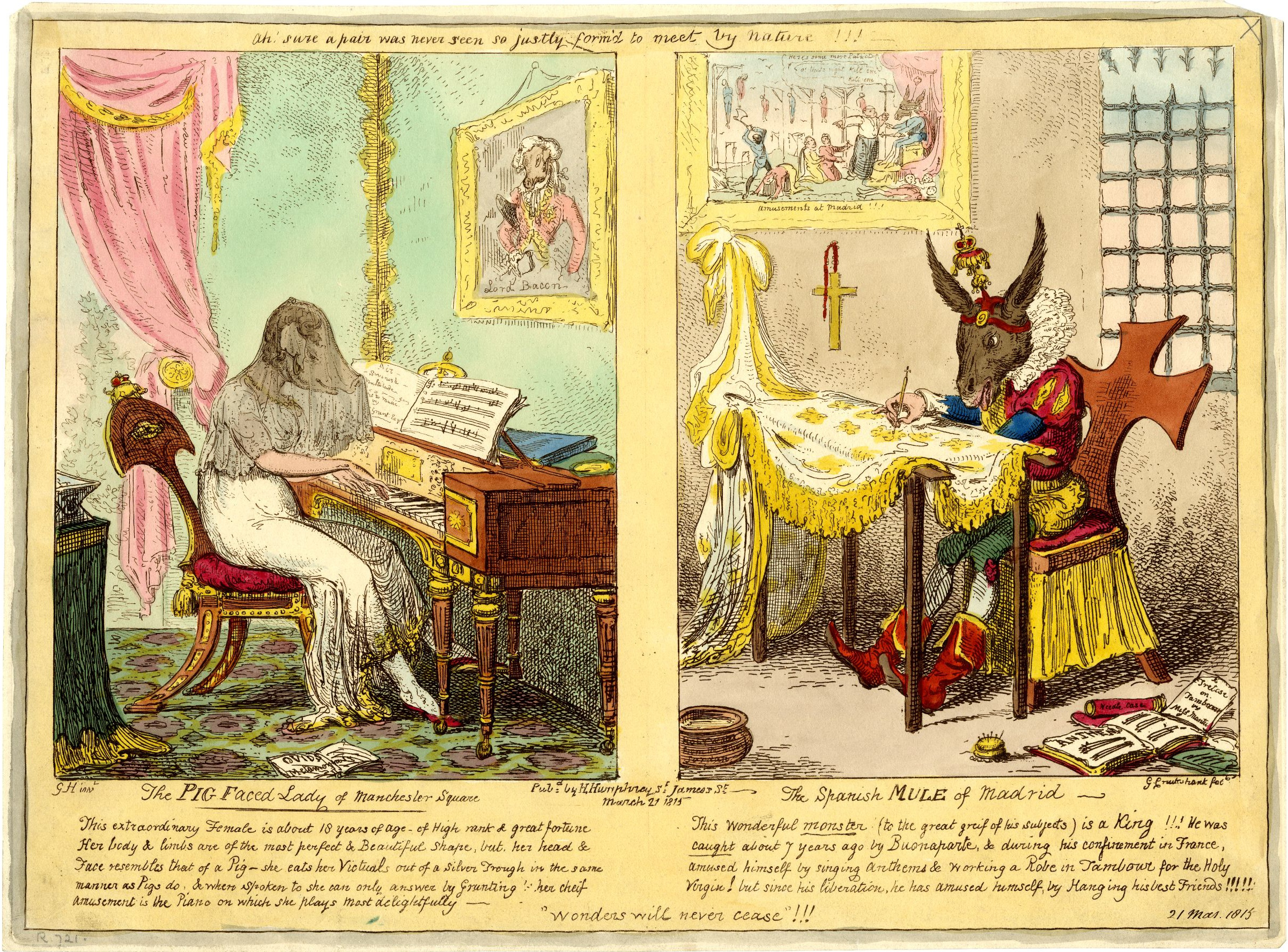
The Pig Faced Lady of Manchester Square and the Spanish Mule of Madrid

On 21 March 1815 The Pig Faced Lady of Manchester Square and the Spanish Mule of Madrid, a coloured print by George Cruikshank, was published. Captioned "Ah! Sure a pair was never seen so justly form'd to meet by nature!", it contrasts the Pig-faced Lady with the unpopular Ferdinand VII of Spain. The Pig-faced Lady wears a transparent veil and plays "Air Swinish Multitude, set to music by Grunt Esq" on a piano. Her silver trough lies on a table behind her, and on her wall is a picture of "Lord Bacon", also shown with a pig's head. Her image is captioned:

This extraordinary Female is about 18 years of age – of High rank & great fortune. Her body & limbs are of the most perfect & Beautiful Shape, but, her head & Face resembles that of a Pig – she eats her Victuals out of a Silver Trough in the same manner as Pigs do, & when spoken to she can only answer by Grunting! her cheif Amusement is the Piano which she plays most delightfully.

Facing her in another panel is Ferdinand VII, shown with a mule's head. Ferdinand sits on a wooden throne, with a chamber pot filled with holy water at his feet. On the wall behind him, a painting shows Ferdinand (again with a mule's head) watching a mass execution; a monk says "Here's some more patriots", and Ferdinand replies "O! That's right kill 'em kill 'em". The caption to Ferdinand's image reads:

This wonderful monster (to the great greif of his subjects) is a King!!! He was caught about 7 years ago by Buonaparte, & during his confinement in France, amused himself by singing anthems & Working a Robe in Tambour for the Holy Virgin! but since his liberation, he has amused himself, by Hanging his best Friends!!!!!

Cruikshank returned to the theme of the Pig-faced Lady with Suitors to the Pig-faced Lady, published shortly after The Pig Faced Lady and the Spanish Mule. This shows a number of men wooing the lady, who rejects them all in term with "If you think to gammon me, you'll find you've got the wrong sow by the ear – I'm meat for your masters, so go along, I'll not be plagued by any of you".

Waltzing a Courtship

At the height of the Pig-faced Lady mania of 1814–15, it was rumoured that Sholto Henry MacLellan, 8th Lord Kirkcudbright had made enquiries about the whereabouts of the Pig-faced Lady of Manchester Square, possibly with a view to becoming one of her suitors. Waltzing a Courtship, an anonymous drawing, was widely circulated in various publications. It shows an elegantly dressed Pig-faced Lady dancing with a hunchbacked and extremely short man bearing a strong resemblance to Kirkcudbright.

Another popular print, The Wonderful Mrs Atkinson, was published anonymously in around 1815, based on an earlier drawing by George Morland. (Morland had died in 1804, so his drawing cannot have been inspired by the 1814–15 reports.) Morland's original drawing stated that the Pig-faced Lady was "born in Ireland, has £20,000 fortune, and is fed out of a silver trough". The caption to the later, published print goes into more detail, claiming that:

The Wonderful Mrs Atkinson is Born and Married to a Gentleman in Ireland of that name, having 20,000 fortune. She is fed out of a Silver Hog-Trough, and is called to her Meals by Pig..Pig..Pig. This wonderful account was told me by George Simpson who will swear to the truth of it, having heard it on board the Vesuvius Gun Boat, from some Irish Sailors who he says cannot tell lies. The above G. Simpson is my Servant and can tell several curious Stories as good as this all of which he will swear to the truth.

=== Paris Pig-faced woman hoax ===
Shortly after the London pig-faced lady craze of 1814–15, a similar story began to circulate in Paris. In this version, the woman was "gifted with every accomplishment in the most transcendant [sic] degree", and was seeking a man who would love her for her talents despite her appearance. Unlike the pig-faced woman reports in London, the woman's address was given. Large crowds gathered in the street outside, and a large number of letters were delivered to the address.

She was eventually revealed as a hoax. A young man, his advances rebuffed by a woman, had started the story as a means of revenge. It was reported that the stream of visitors wishing to meet the Pig-faced Lady became so annoying, the young woman in question was forced to move house.

== Fair exhibits in the 19th century ==
In the wake of the Pig-faced Lady scare of 1814–15, exhibits on the subject of pig-faced women became popular at fairs. William Wilde records that a print of The Wonderful Mrs Atkinson was a popular exhibit at an early 19th century Irish fair, while larger fairs included exhibits of pig-faced women moulded in papier-mâché or wax. There is some evidence that a living pig-faced woman was exhibited at Bartholomew Fair in 1828, and possibly also in previous years. (The pig-faced woman exhibited in Wakefield in 1828–29, recalled by George Lloyd in 1861, may have been the same one shown at Bartholomew Fair in 1828.) At an 1843 fair in Hyde Park, "Madam Steevens, the Wonderful Pig-faced Lady" was exhibited, and would grunt to give replies to questions from the audience.

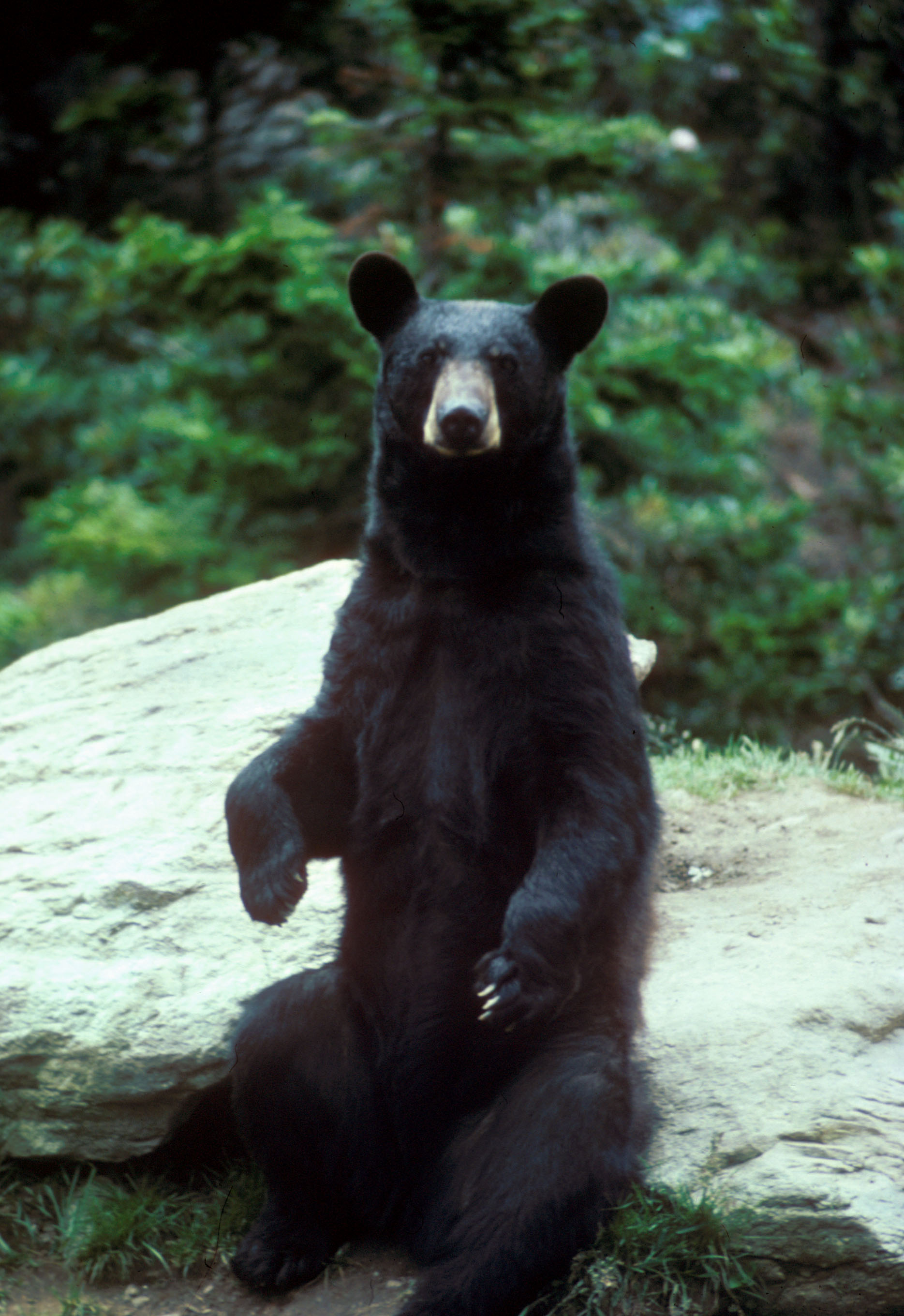
Bears stand and sit with postures similar to humans'.

The pig-faced women exhibited at fairs were not genuine. Showmen would drug a bear into a stupor by feeding it large amounts of strong beer, and then shave it. Once shaved, the drunken bear would be fitted with padded artificial breasts, and dressed in women's clothing and a wig. Shoes would be attached to the bear's hind paws, and stuffed gloves to the front paws. The bear would then be placed in a chair with a hole in the back, and securely tied to the chair.

Once the bear was dressed and in the chair, the audience would be allowed into the tent. The showman would tell the audience that the Pig-faced Lady could not speak, but would answer questions put to her, with one grunt for "yes" and two for "no". The audience would ask her questions, and a member of the crew would poke the bear with a stick to make it grunt in reply. The Pig-faced Lady would then eat a meal of gruel, beer and apples, served in a silver trough. The display of "pig-faced ladies" became extremely popular, to the extent that by 1861 Charles Dickens remarked that "no fair was complete without one". Exhibitions of this type were particularly popular in Dublin; an exhibition in Plymouth in the 1880s was less successful, and a disbelieving mob pulled the wig and hat from a "Pig-faced Lady" in her tent and proceeded to attack the showmen. The fate of the bear is not recorded.

== Uncle Silas ==
The legend of the pig-faced woman was revived once more in 1865, in Sheridan Le Fanu's novel Uncle Silas. Uncle Silas tells the story of Maud Ruthyn, a wealthy heiress in her late teens who lives in a secluded house, whom a number of scheming men aim to marry to secure her money. The book includes a "Bretagne ballad" about the pig-faced woman, sung to Maud by her scheming governess Madame de la Rougierre as Rougierre leads her to a secret meeting with her cousin Dudley, who also has designs on her fortune. (No other record of the "Bretagne ballad" exists, and it was almost certainly written by Le Fanu himself.)

This lady was neither pig nor maid,
And so she was not of human mould;
Not of the living nor the dead.
Her left hand and foot were warm to touch;
Her right as cold as a corpse's flesh!
And she would sing like a funeral bell, with a ding-dong tune.
The pigs were afraid, and viewed her aloof;
And women feared her and stood afar.
She could do without sleep for a year and a day;
She could sleep like a corpse, for a month and more.
No one knew how this lady fed –
On acorns or on flesh.
Some say that she's one of the swine-possessed,
That swam over the sea of Gennesaret.
A mongrel body and demon soul.
Some say she's the wife of the Wandering Jew,
And broke the law for the sake of pork;
And a swinish face for a token doth bear,
That her shame is now, and her punishment coming.

While Maud is described in the book as an attractive young woman, not a deformed monster, Uncle Silas is carefully written and plotted, and it is almost certain that Le Fanu explicitly intended a comparison between Maud's situation and the legend of the wealthy woman living in isolation and desired only for her money. Le Fanu spent his entire life in Dublin and was editor and proprietor of the Dublin University Magazine, and would certainly have been familiar with the legends of the pig-faced woman, and in particular the case of Griselda Steevens.

== Decline of the legend ==
The 1814–15 Pig-faced Lady craze in London and the subsequent hoax in Paris were the last occasions in which the mainstream press reported the existence of pig-faced women as fact. By the 1860s the fad for exhibiting "pig-faced women" at fairs was losing popularity, although they continued to be exhibited until at least the 1880s. By the year 2000 the legend was almost forgotten.

While Dr Steevens' Hospital still exists, albeit now as the head office of the Health Service Executive (Feidhmeannacht na Seirbhíse Sláinte) rather than as a working hospital, the display of Pig-faced Lady memorabilia at the hospital had ceased by the mid-19th century. The portrait commissioned by Griselda Steevens to refute the rumours about her appearance still hangs in the hospital's main hall.

The last significant work to treat the existence of pig-faced women as fact was Ghosts, Helpful and Harmful by ghost hunter and supernatural researcher Elliott O'Donnell, published in 1924. O'Donnell alleged that the ghost of a pig-faced lady haunted a house in Chelsea. O'Donnell claimed that the ghost was a "Vice Elemental, the most harmful of all the denizens of the Spirit World". He describes how a clergyman, "The Rev. Mr H." and his family, who resided in the house, were tempted by the ghost. The ghost, keeping her face concealed, led "The Rev. Mr H." into drunkenness, and his children into cruelty towards animals, until they themselves behaved like pigs. She then revealed her face to the shocked family, who moved out of the house immediately.

The body, beautifully formed, and gleaming like polished ivory in the moonbeams, resembled that of a woman, but the face was the face of some very grotesque and repulsive animal. In the place of human cheeks were huge collops of white, unwholesome fat; the nose was snoutlike, the mouth a great slit, full of hideous crooked tusks; and whilst the whole conformity of the features suggested the face of a distorted and horrible-looking pig, the animal, in contrast to the human, was made all the more poignant by the hair – unmistakably a woman's – which fell in a bright mass of rippling gold around the neck and shoulders. The children were still staring at it, in speechless horror, when their father opened the door of his room; and as he did so, the figure slowly faded away and vanished.

== See also ==
- Cultural references to pigs
- Learned pig
- Varahi, a Hindu goddess with a woman's body and a pig's head
- Vajravārāhī, a Buddhist deity who prominently displays a sow's head above her right ear
- Penelope, a 2006 film about a woman with a pig's snout
- "Eye of the Beholder", a Twilight Zone episode featuring a reversal of this trope, with a normal-faced human woman among pig-faced people
- "The Bris", a Seinfeld episode that involves a pig-faced man
- The Wedding of Sir Gawain and Dame Ragnelle, an Arthurian tale involving a woman cursed to be grotesquely ugly (although not specifically with the head of a pig), which also ends with a wedding and the bridegroom being asked to make the same choice
- Miss Piggy

== Notes and references ==
=== Bibliography ===
- Bondeson, Jan (2006). The Pig-Faced Lady of Manchester Square & Other Medical Marvels. Stroud: Tempus Publishing. ISBN 0-7524-3662-7.
- Burton, William Evans (September 1837). "Scissibles". Burton's Gentleman's Magazine. 1 (3). Philadelphia.
- Chambers, Robert (17 August 1850). "'Modern Myths' – The Pig-Faced Lady". Chambers's Edinburgh Journal (346). Edinburgh: William Chambers.
- Chambers, Robert (1864). The Book of Days. Vol. 2. London: W. & R. Chambers.
- Dickens, Charles (28 December 1861). "A Prodigy Hunter". All the Year Round. 6 (140). London: Charles Dickens.
- Gronow, Rees Howell (1864). Captain Gronow's Recollections and Anecdotes of the Camp, the Court and the Clubs at the Close of the Last War with France. London: Smith, Elder & Co.
- Guinness, Desmond (1967). Portrait of Dublin. London: Batsford. OCLC 460565214.
- Le Fanu, Joseph Sheridan (1864). Uncle Silas. Vol. 1. London: Richard Bentley.
- O'Donnell, Elliott (1924). Ghosts, Helpful and Harmful. London: W. Rider. OCLC 1997425.
- Ó Súilleabháin, Seán (1971). "Díoltas i nDroch-Bhirt". Béaloideas (in Irish). 39. Dublin: An Cumann Le Béaloideas Éireann/The Folklore of Ireland Society: 251–265. doi:10.2307/20521359. JSTOR 20521359.
- Rollins, Hyder E., ed. (1922). A Pepysian Garland; Black-Letter Broadside Ballads of the Years 1595–1639. Cambridge: Cambridge University Press. OCLC 295990069.
- Timbs, John (1865). Romance of London. Vol. 2. London: Richard Bentley.
- Townsend, Horatio (1860). The History of Mercer's Charitable Hospital in Dublin. Dublin: George Herbert.
- Wadd, William (June 1829). "Observations on the Organ of Scent". Quarterly Journal of Science, Literature, and Art. London: The Royal Institution of Great Britain.
- John Wilson, ed. (1830). The Bibliographical and Retrospective Miscellany. London: John Wilson.
