= Richard Steevens =

Irish physician

- Born: 1653
- Died: 15 December 1710 (aged 56–57)
- Occupation: Physician

Richard Steevens (1653 – 15 December 1710) was an Irish physician.

== Biography ==
Steevens and his twin sister Grizell (1653–1746), were the children of John Steevens, an English royalist clergyman who settled in Ireland in the middle of the seventeenth century, and was rector of Athlone from 1660 to 1682. Richard Steevens received his education at the Latin school in Athlone and at Trinity College, Dublin, where he obtained a scholarship in 1674, graduated B.A. in 1675, and M.A. in 1678. In line with his father's wishes that he join the church, he took deacon's orders, but chose to proceed no further in the ministry, instead devoting himself to the medical profession. In 1687 he received the degree of M.D. from his university, after which he practised as a physician in Dublin, amassing a large fortune. He was a fellow of the Irish College of Physicians, and in 1710 was elected its president, but died in office on 15 December 1710.

Steevens left the bulk of his property to his sister Grizell, and directed that upon her death it should vest in trustees to be applied in building, and subsequently in maintaining, a hospital in Dublin, ‘for maintaining and curing from time to time such sick and wounded persons whose distempers and wounds are curable.’ Grizell, being ‘desirous that the said charitable bequest of her dear brother should begin to take effect in her lifetime,’ surrendered her estate to the trustees in 1717, reserving only 100 l. a year, out of a rental of 600 l, together with apartments in the hospital when built. She also gave 2,000 l. towards the cost of building. The hospital, Steevens's hospital, was completed in 1733 at a cost of 16,000 l., and was the first public hospital in Dublin, where it became one of the foremost institutions of its kind. Dean Swift was one of its earliest governors, and ‘Stella’ (Esther Johnson) in her will bequeathed 1,000l. towards the maintenance of a chaplain of the hospital, so long as the Church of Ireland should remain established. Another benefactor was John Sterne, bishop of Clogher. Grizell died on 18 March 1746, and left her remaining property to the governors of the hospital. Her remains are interred in the hospital chapel. Portraits of Steevens and his sister were placed in the hospital board room.
