= Penelope (2006 film) =

2006 film by Mark Palansky

- Theatrical release poster
- Directed by: Mark Palansky
- Written by: Leslie Caveny
- Produced by: Reese Witherspoon; Scott Steindorff; Jennifer Simpson
- Starring: Christina Ricci; James McAvoy; Catherine O'Hara; Peter Dinklage; Richard E. Grant; Reese Witherspoon
- Cinematography: Michel Amathieu
- Edited by: Jon Gregory
- Music by: Joby Talbot
- Production companies: Summit Entertainment; Stone Village Pictures; Type A Films; Tatira Active Film; Grosvenor Park Productions; Zephyr Films
- Distributed by: Momentum Pictures (United Kingdom); Summit Entertainment (United States); Hyde Park International (international)
- Release dates: September 8, 2006 (TIFF); February 1, 2008 (United Kingdom); February 29, 2008 (United States)
- Running time: 104 minutes
- Countries: United Kingdom; United States
- Language: English
- Box office: $21.2 million

Penelope is a 2006 fantasy romantic comedy film directed by Mark Palansky and starring Christina Ricci, James McAvoy, Catherine O'Hara, Peter Dinklage, Richard E. Grant, and Reese Witherspoon (who also produced the film). The film tells the story of a young heiress named Penelope Wilhern, who was born with the snout of a pig due to a curse that was placed on her family by a vengeful witch, believing the only way to break the curse is to find another blue blood who truly loved her.

== Plot ==
Decades earlier, servant woman Clara falls in love with blue blood Ralph Wilhern and becomes pregnant with his child. However, at the urging of his disapproving parents, Ralph marries another woman, leading a heartbroken Clara to commit suicide by jumping off a cliff. Her mother, the town witch, places a curse on the Wilhern bloodline; the next Wilhern daughter will be born with the face of a pig, only to become human when "one of her own kind" learns to love her. However, the Wilherns only give birth to sons for five generations until the birth of Franklin and Jessica Wilhern's daughter, Penelope.

Ashamed and fearing a media scandal, Jessica claims that Penelope died as an infant and hides her away in their London mansion. After Penelope's 18th birthday, Jessica hires a matchmaker, Wanda, and begins seeking out suitors, believing the love of another blue blood is the only way to lift the curse.

Seven years later, all of Penelope's suitors have fled in terror upon seeing her face, including Edward Humphrey Vanderman III. Edward conspires with tabloid reporter Lemon to photograph Penelope to prove her existence and hires young blue blood Max Campion to pose as a new suitor, planting a camera in his jacket. After having conversations through a one-way mirror, Penelope and Max develop genuine feelings for each other. When Max sees her face, he is shocked—but not frightened—and accidentally triggers the camera. Regretful of his attempts to exploit Penelope, Max calls off the agreement and destroys the camera. Penelope begs him to marry her, promising it will lift the curse, but Max declines.

Tired of the matchmaking and inspired by Max's conversations about the outside world, Penelope escapes home and journeys out into the city, covering her face with a scarf in public to remain anonymous and secretly selling photos of herself to Lemon to earn money. At a pub she frequents, Penelope befriends delivery girl Annie, who takes her on trips around the city. After several weeks, Penelope is spotted by her parents, but before they can confront her, she rushes back to the pub, where she faints. Annie removes the scarf to help her breathe and exposes her as the supposedly dead Penelope Wilhern to the other patrons. To Penelope's surprise, the public is fascinated and enamored with her, and she becomes an overnight celebrity.

Edward's father, having seen the public's fondness for Penelope and embarrassed by his son's vocal cruelty toward her, coerces Edward into proposing to her. Lemon discovers that the real Max Campion is imprisoned for armed robbery; the man he had been working with is actually a gambler named Johnny Martin. He shares this with Jessica and Wanda on Penelope's wedding day, but they decide not to relay it to Penelope. At her wedding, Penelope, realizing that she does not want to marry simply to break the curse, flees the altar and locks herself in her room. Jessica begs her to reconsider, but Penelope refuses, declaring that she likes herself the way she is. As Penelope has finally been loved by "one of her own kind"—herself—the curse is lifted, and her pig snout and ears vanish.

Some time later, Penelope is an elementary school horticulture teacher, and the public's interest in her has waned. She eventually learns the truth about Johnny's identity from Wanda and visits his apartment during a Halloween party while wearing a pig mask. Johnny kisses Penelope and apologizes for not having the power to break the curse, but she takes off her mask and reveals that she held the power all along, and the two kiss again.

The Wilhern's butler Jake, revealed to be the witch who cast the original curse, casts one final spell to render Jessica mute for an indeterminate amount of time before quitting his position. While Penelope and Johnny are at a park with her students, Lemon discreetly approaches and tries to take a photo of them to prove that the curse has been lifted. Upon seeing how happy they are, he ultimately decides against it and leaves.

== Cast ==
- Christina Ricci as Penelope Wilhern, a young heiress who was born with the face of a pig
  - Andi-Marie Townsend portrays a younger Penelope Wilhern.
- James McAvoy as Johnny Martin, a man who uses the alias of "Max Campion" and is Penelope's love interest
- Catherine O'Hara as Jessica Wilhern, Penelope's mother
- Peter Dinklage as Lemon, a tabloid reporter who plans to expose Penelope's existence
- Richard E. Grant as Franklin Wilhern, Penelope's father
- Reese Witherspoon as Annie, a delivery girl who befriends Penelope
- Simon Woods as Edward Humphrey Vanderman III, a former suitor of Penelope who allies with Lemon
- Ronni Ancona as Wanda, a matchmaker
- Nigel Havers as Edward Vanderman II, Edward Vanderman III's father
- Lenny Henry as Krull
- Michael Feast as Jake, a butler who works for the Wilhern family
  - Michael Feast also portrays the true form of the Witch who cursed the Wilhern family.
- John Voce as station cop
- Burn Gorman as Larry
- Nick Frost as the real Max Campion, a man who was cut off from his family due to his gambling problems
- Richard Leaf as Jack, the bartender of a pub which is frequented by Annie
- Russell Brand as Sam, the jazz club owner

== Production ==
The production of Penelope started in January 2006 in London and Pinewood Studios, Buckinghamshire. It was Reese Witherspoon's first film in a producing role along with a small acting role. The film's screenplay was written by Leslie Caveny. A novelization of the film was written by Marilyn Kaye.

== Soundtrack ==
Joby Talbot composed the music for the film. A soundtrack album was released.

Penelope (Original Motion Picture Soundtrack) track listing
No.	Title	Artist	Length
1.	"The Story of the Curse, Part 1"	Joby Talbot	3:57
2.	"The Story of the Curse, Part 2"	Joby Talbot	4:58
3.	"Waking Life"	Schuyler Fisk	4:07
4.	"The Piano Song"	Meiko	2:46
5.	"Penelope Breaks Free"	Joby Talbot	1:58
6.	"Fairground"	Joby Talbot	1:31
7.	"Give In"	The Secret 6	4:46
8.	"Queen of Surface Streets"	DeVotchKa	5:26
9.	"String of Blinking Lights"	Paper Moon	4:18
10.	"The Wedding"	Joby Talbot	4:03
11.	"Ageless Beauty"	Stars	4:05
12.	"The Kiss"	Joby Talbot	4:22
13.	"Hoppípolla"	Sigur Rós	4:15
14.	"Your Disguise"	James Greenspun	3:09

== Release ==
Penelope premiered at the 2006 Toronto International Film Festival on September 8, 2006. The following month, IFC Films acquired U.S. distribution rights to the film, with The Weinstein Company handling the home media and television distribution, with a planned mid-2007 release. Summit Entertainment eventually picked up U.S. distribution rights.

The film was also shown at the Cannes Film Festival in May 2007. It opened in Russia and Ukraine in August 2007. Penelope was released in the United Kingdom on February 1, 2008. It opened in wide release in the United States and Canada on February 29, 2008.

=== Home media ===
Penelope was released on DVD and Blu-ray on July 15, 2008, in the United States. It included a 2:35:1 anamorphic widescreen and an English Dolby Digital 5.1 Surround track. The extras were a behind-the-scenes featurette, cast and crew, production notes, and world-premiere features from the then-upcoming Summit film Twilight as well as behind-the-scenes features and interviews from the film, released four months later. Only the German Blu-ray version of the film, released in 2011, carries the full 104-minute version of the film. US and UK releases of the film are all the edited 88/89 minute cut.

== Reception ==
=== Box office ===
Penelope grossed $10 million in the United States and Canada, and $11.1 million in other territories, for a worldwide total of $21.2 million. In the United States and Canada, the film opened in ninth place and earned $3.8 million on its opening weekend.

=== Critical response ===
The film received mixed reviews from critics. On the review aggregator website Rotten Tomatoes, the film holds an approval rating of 53% based on 128 reviews, with an average rating of 5.7/10. The website's critics consensus reads: "Though Penelope has a charming cast and an appealing message, it ultimately suffers from faulty narrative and sloppy direction." Metacritic, which uses a weighted average, assigned the film a score of 48 out of 100, based on 29 critics, indicating "mixed or average" reviews.

== See also ==
- Pig-faced women
