= Bow Lane West =

Street in Dublin, Ireland

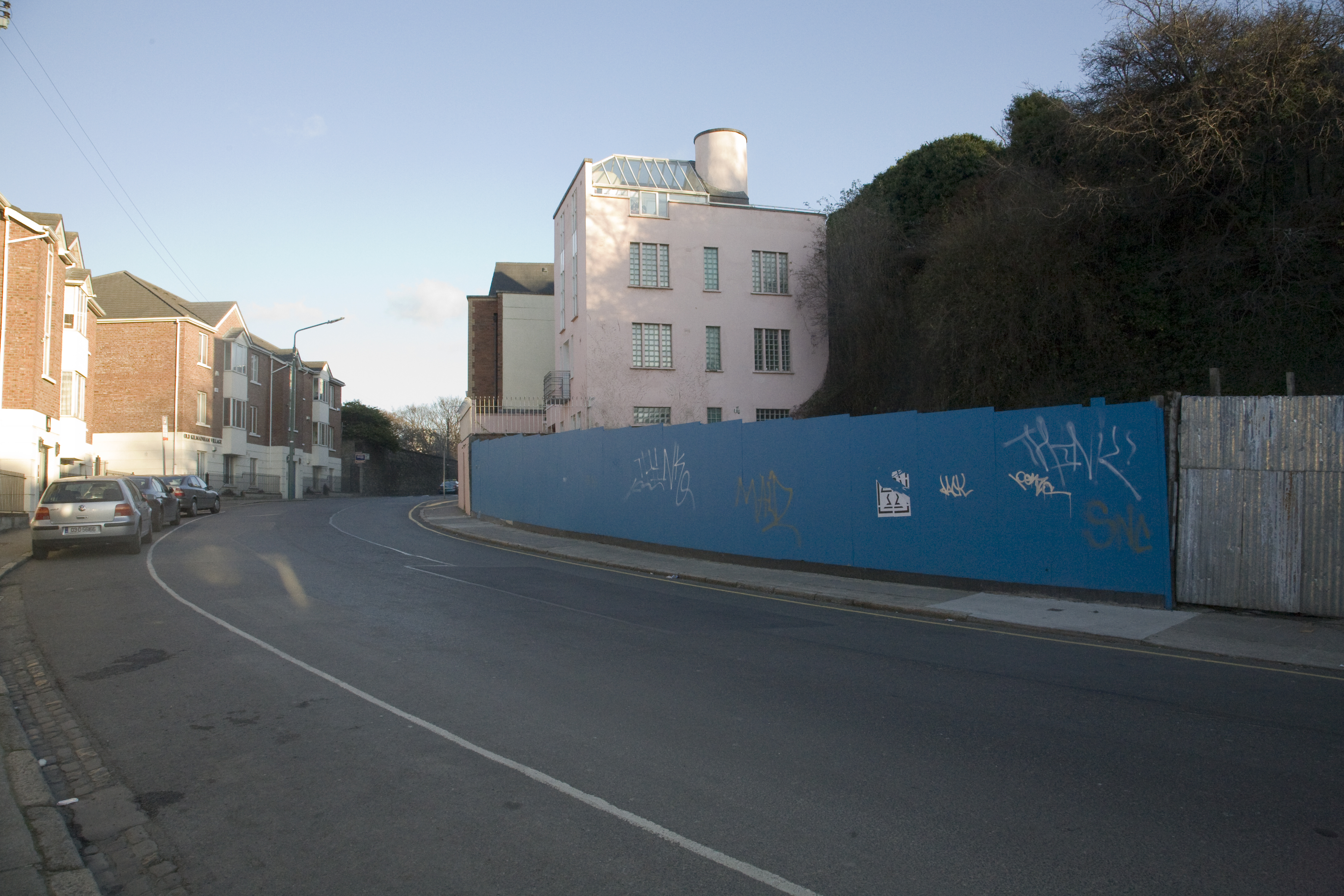
- Looking east down Bow Lane West, 2007

- Location within Central Dublin
- Native name: Lána na hUillinne Thiar (Irish)
- Namesake: bent (bowed) shape
- Type: Lane
- Length: 430
- Location: Dublin, Ireland
- Postal code: D08
- Coordinates: 53°20′36″N 6°17′36″W
- East: James's Street
- West: Bow Bridge

Bow Lane West (Irish: Lána na hUillinne Thiar) is a street in Dublin, Ireland.

== Location ==
Bow Lane West runs from Bow Bridge to James's Street along the southern side of St Patrick's University Hospital. Bow Bridge crosses the River Camac.

== History ==
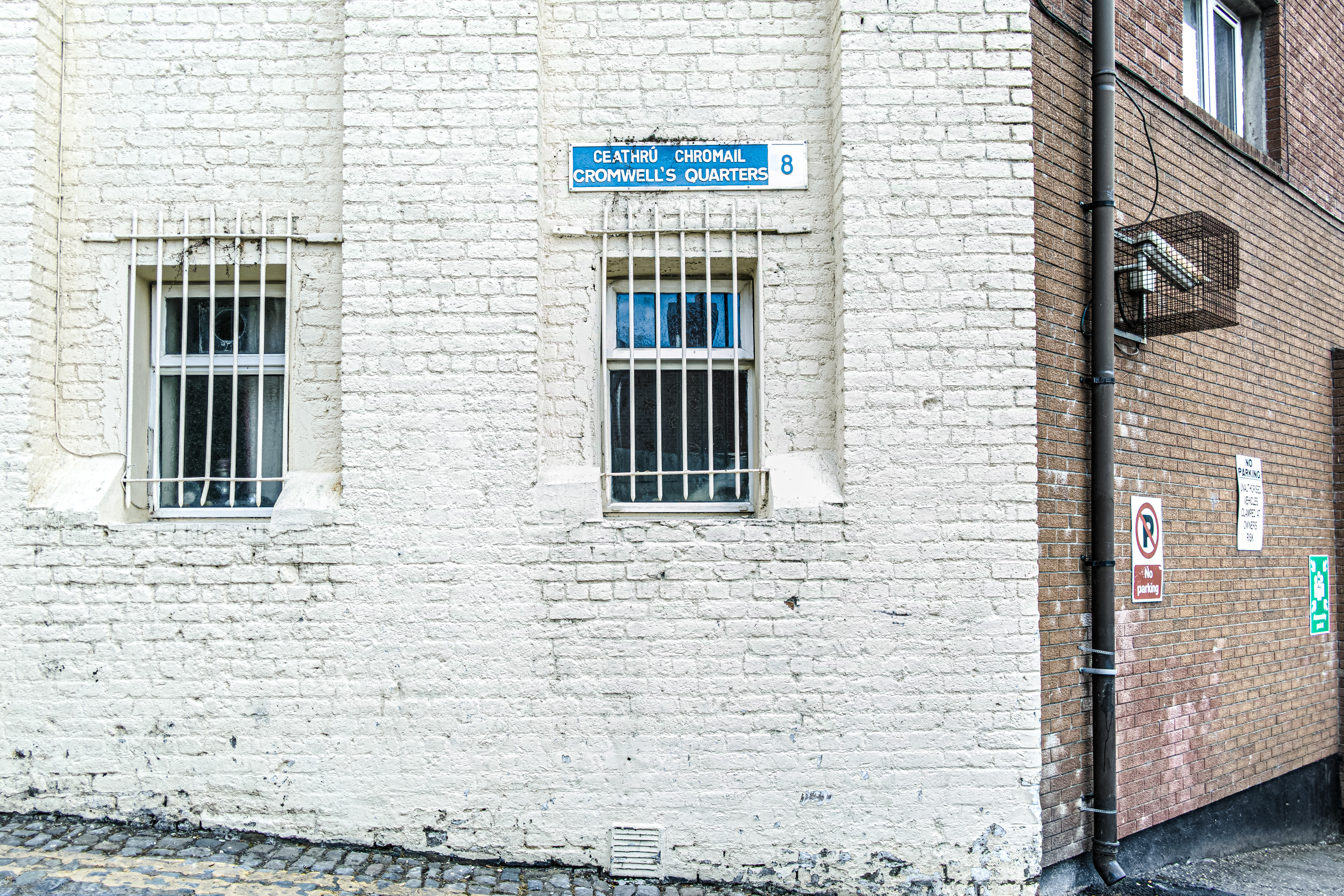
Cromwell's Quarters at Bow Lane West

Bow Lane West first appears on maps of Dublin with John Rocque's map of 1756. The name may derive from its crooked shape. Neither Bow Lane West nor Bow Bridge appear on early maps of Dublin as they lay outside the city gates. In 1862, the area was predominately tenements.

There is a small pedestrian lane that connect James's Street on the south to Bow Lane West on the north. It was previously known as Murdering Lane or The Murd'ring Lane, and first appeared on maps in 1603, until it was renamed 'Cromwell's Quarters' around 1892 when Alderman McSwiney called for the lane to be renamed in order to “preserve historical continuity”. The Cromwell in question was not Oliver Cromwell but his son Henry, who became Lord Deputy of Ireland in 1657. It is currently an unmarked pedestrian stepped alley. The lane is also locally referred to as "The Forty Steps", even though there are only 39.

== History of the housing development at Bow Lane West ==
In 1886, Dublin Corporation proposed a scheme to build 85 two- and three-roomed cottages at Bow Lane West, Dublin. The scheme was intended to house Dublin's lower socio-economic classes. The Dublin Corporation would be swindled financially by the original development plans for the homes at Bow Lane West since the structures were going to be rented for less than it cost to construct them.

Prior to the development of the scheme, there was little to no research put into the suitability/quality of the land at Bow Lane West. When the City Architect carried out a survey on the land, it concluded that the land was unsuitable for building and that the sanitary conditions were very poor. Due to these factors it was now believed that it would cost £12,500 plans to build at Bow Lane rather than the originally estimated £10,325. Due to the increase in price the Council feared that rent would also have to increase for the tenants that would live in the houses - this would mean that residency would be expensive at Bow Lane West and therefore it wouldn't be able to house the poorer social class that it had originally intended to. The Council met in March 1888 to consider whether or not it would be more financially advantageous to decide to build the properties elsewhere. The Council decided that after the city engineer re-planned the construction of the properties, it would be preferable to make a decision. By reviewing the designs, the council would have a more accurate estimation of the project's cost.

The Council looked to Mr. Dudgeon for guidance on Bow Lane West and how to keep expenses low because he was renowned for his ability to control project costs. 85 tenements were supposed to be housed in 61 cottages and 12 two-story homes, according to the council's initial plans. According to Mr. Dudgeon, it would be preferable to arrange the 86 tenements in two-story blocks with four tenements each. Since the rooms in the blocks are actually big enough to accommodate six people if necessary, Mr. Dudgeon thought that this amount of space would be adequate for four people to live in. Because fewer cottages were built and therefore less of the land at Bow Lane West needed to be restored, the council could save money by using two-story buildings instead of a large number of cottages. The scheme Mr. Dudgeon created also proposed for the construction of five stores at Bow Lane West. The concept developed by Mr. Dudgeon was much liked by the council members since it was within the price range that the council had initially anticipated for the houses at Bow Lane West to cost. After the successful construction of the dwellings the Dublin Council conducted a background check on all tenements to guarantee that their financial circumstances were of the lower class and places to rent within the project had been filled by May 1889.

The housing development scheme at Bow Lane West gained popularity as housing schemes were still new to Dublin. The Lord Mayor of Dublin at the time voiced his opinion that other schemes should be created in the future like Bow Lane West to assist those of the working class who simply could not afford other housing in Dublin as it was too expensive.
