= Grizell Steevens =

Anglo-Irish benefactor (1653–1746)

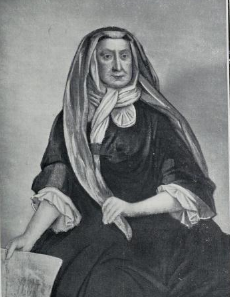
- Portrait of Steevens
- Born: Griselda Steevens; 1653; England
- Died: 18 March 1746 (aged 92–93); Dublin, Ireland

Griselda Steevens (also known as Grizel Steevens or Grizell Steevens) (1653 – 18 March 1746) was a philanthropist and a benefactor of Dr Steevens' Hospital in Dublin. For a time it was commonly known as "Madame Steevens' Hospital".

== Life ==
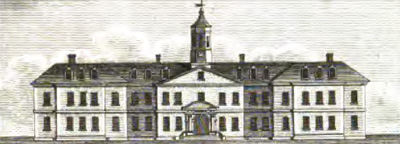
Steevens' Hospital in 1800

Steevens was born in 1653 in Wiltshire, in England. She was the twin sister of Richard Steevens (1653–1710), a Dublin physician. They were the children of John, a Royalist cleric, and his wife Constance. The family moved to Athlone, Co Westmeath when John was made a rector there in 1664.

Richard Steevens died in 1710, leaving a considerable fortune which produced an income of £606 (about £100,000 as of 2023) per year to Griselda. Richard directed that upon his sister's death the funds should be used in building, and subsequently maintaining, a hospital in Dublin 'for maintaining and curing from time to time such sick and wounded persons whose distempers and wounds are curable'.

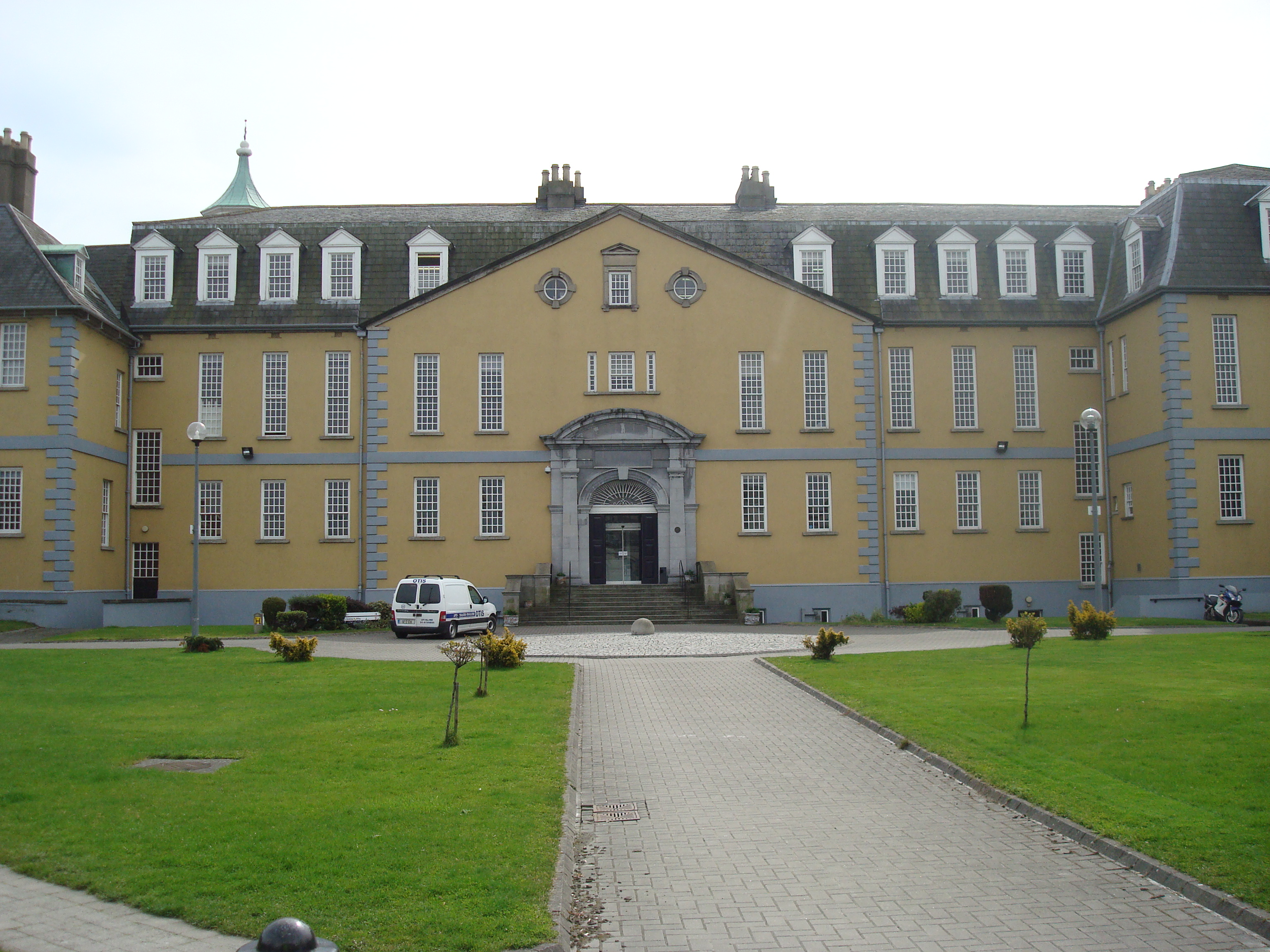
The Dr Steevens' Hospital building in Dublin

Griselda Steevens decided that she would begin work on the hospital in 1717. Reserving only £120 per year for her own use, she surrendered the remainder to trustees to build the new hospital.

By 1723 a sufficient portion of the new Dr Steevens' Hospital was completed to accommodate 40 patients, in addition to Griselda's apartments. The remainder of the hospital, with space for 200 patients, opened in 1733. The new hospital was known as "Madame Steeven's Hospital".

It was the first public hospital established in Dublin, where it became one of the foremost institutions of its kind. Jonathan Swift was one of its earliest governors, and his friend Stella (Esther Johnson) in her will bequeathed £1,000 towards the maintenance of a chaplain.

Steevens died in Dublin on 18 March 1746. By her will she bequeathed the residue of her property to the governors of the hospital. She was buried in the hospital chapel.

The archives of the hospital are in the Library of Trinity College Dublin.

== See also ==
- Pig-faced women

== References and sources ==
=== Sources ===
- Bondeson, Jan (2006). The Pig-Faced Lady of Manchester Square & Other Medical Marvels. Stroud: Tempus Publishing. ISBN 0-7524-3662-7.
- Chambers, Robert (17 August 1850). "'Modern Myths'—The Pig-Faced Lady". Chambers's Edinburgh Journal (346). Edinburgh: William Chambers.
- Chambers, Robert (1864). The Book of Days. Vol. 2. London: W. & R. Chambers.
- Guinness, Desmond (1967). Portrait of Dublin. London: Batsford. OCLC 460565214.
- Ó Súilleabháin, Seán (1971). "Díoltas i nDroch-Bhirt". Béaloideas (in Irish). 39. Dublin: An Cumann Le Béaloideas Éireann/The Folklore of Ireland Society: 251–265. doi:10.2307/20521359. JSTOR 20521359.
- Townsend, Horatio (1860). The History of Mercer's Charitable Hospital in Dublin. Dublin: George Herbert.
