= Steeven's Lane, Dublin =

Lane for trams in Dublin, Ireland

Coordinates: 53°20′41″N 6°17′29″W

Steeven's Lane
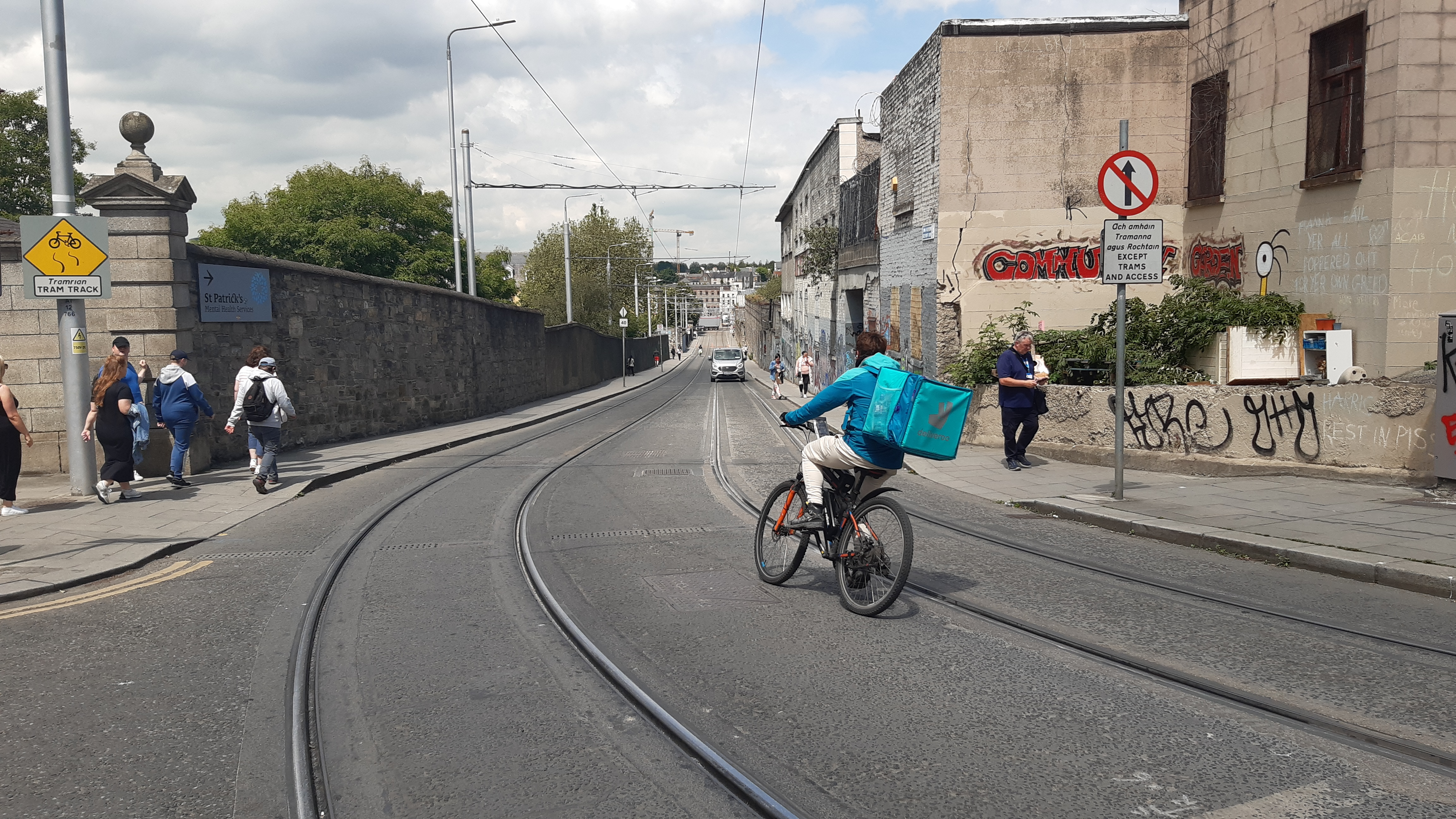
- A Deliveroo rider about to descend the street in 2024

- Location within Central Dublin
- Native name: Lána Steevens (Irish)
- Namesake: Dr Richard Steevens
- Length: 310 m (1,020 ft)
- Width: 9.3 metres (31 ft)
- Location: Dublin, Ireland
- Postal code: D02
- south end: James's Street
- north end: Saint John's Road West

Other
- Known for: Dr Steevens' Hospital, St Patrick's University Hospital

Steeven's Lane (Irish: Lána Steevens) is a street or lane in central Dublin, Ireland. The street is solely for the use of Dublin's Luas trams, emergency services, pedestrians and bicycles. The lane was laid out in the late 1710s for the purposes of facilitating access to Dr Steevens' Hospital from James's Street.

== History ==
Dr Richard Steevens died in 1710, leaving his fortune to his sister Grizell with the intention that when she died, the proceeds would then be used to fund the building of a hospital in the city of Dublin. Grizell decided to give the money to trustees prior to her death, on the condition that she could live in the hospital for the rest of her life.

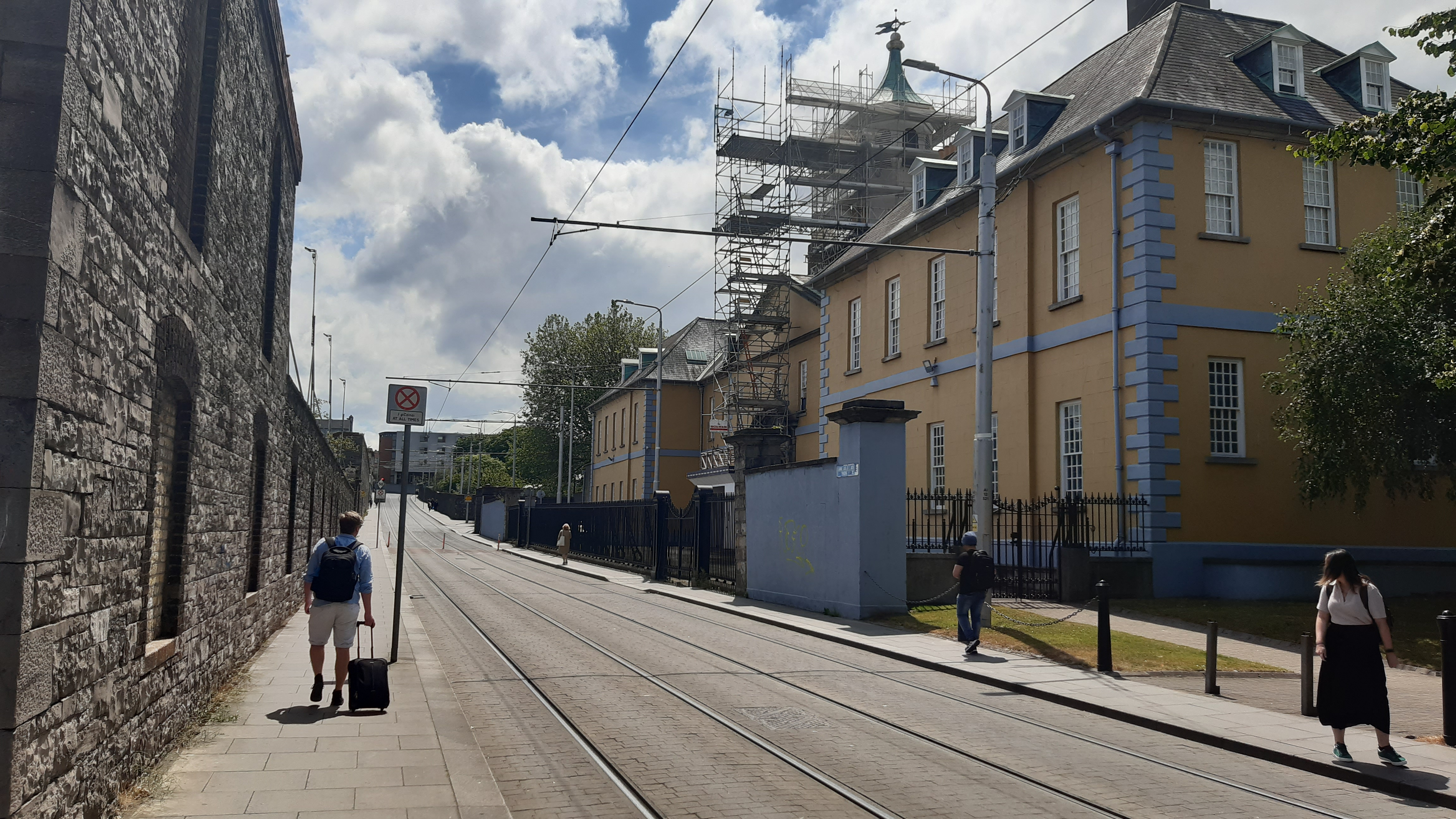
Dr Steevens' Hospital fronting the street

In August 1717, she executed a deed appointing 14 trustees to begin the planning and building of the hospital and gave them £2,000 for the purpose. A fortnight later, the trustees met for the first time and agreed to purchase about three and a half acres of land lying at the end of James's Street for £600. It was considered ideal as a site for a hospital, situated as it was on green fields sloping down to the banks of the River Liffey, with fields also separating it from the grounds of the Royal Hospital Kilmainham completed some decades prior.

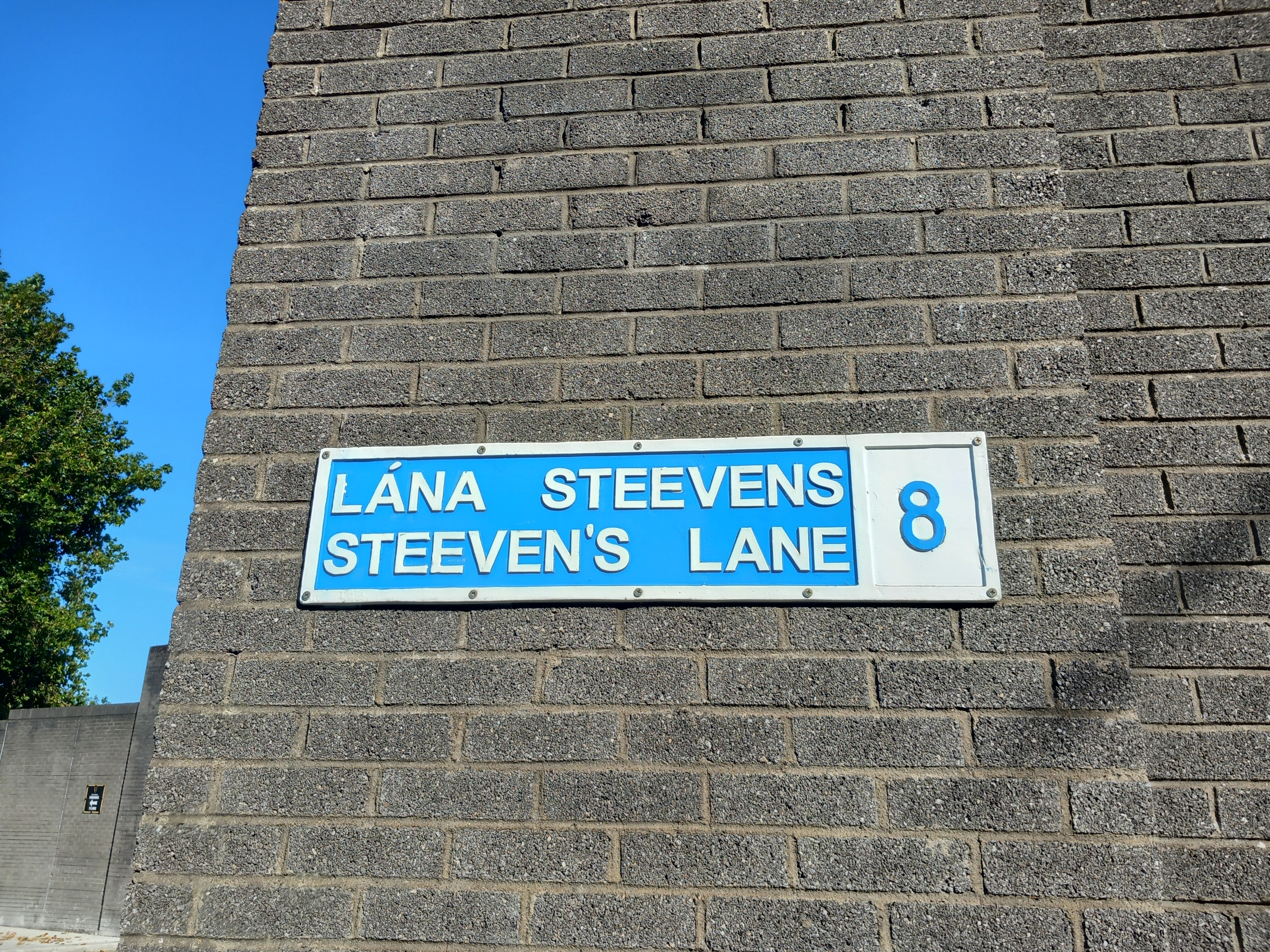
Steeven's Lane street sign

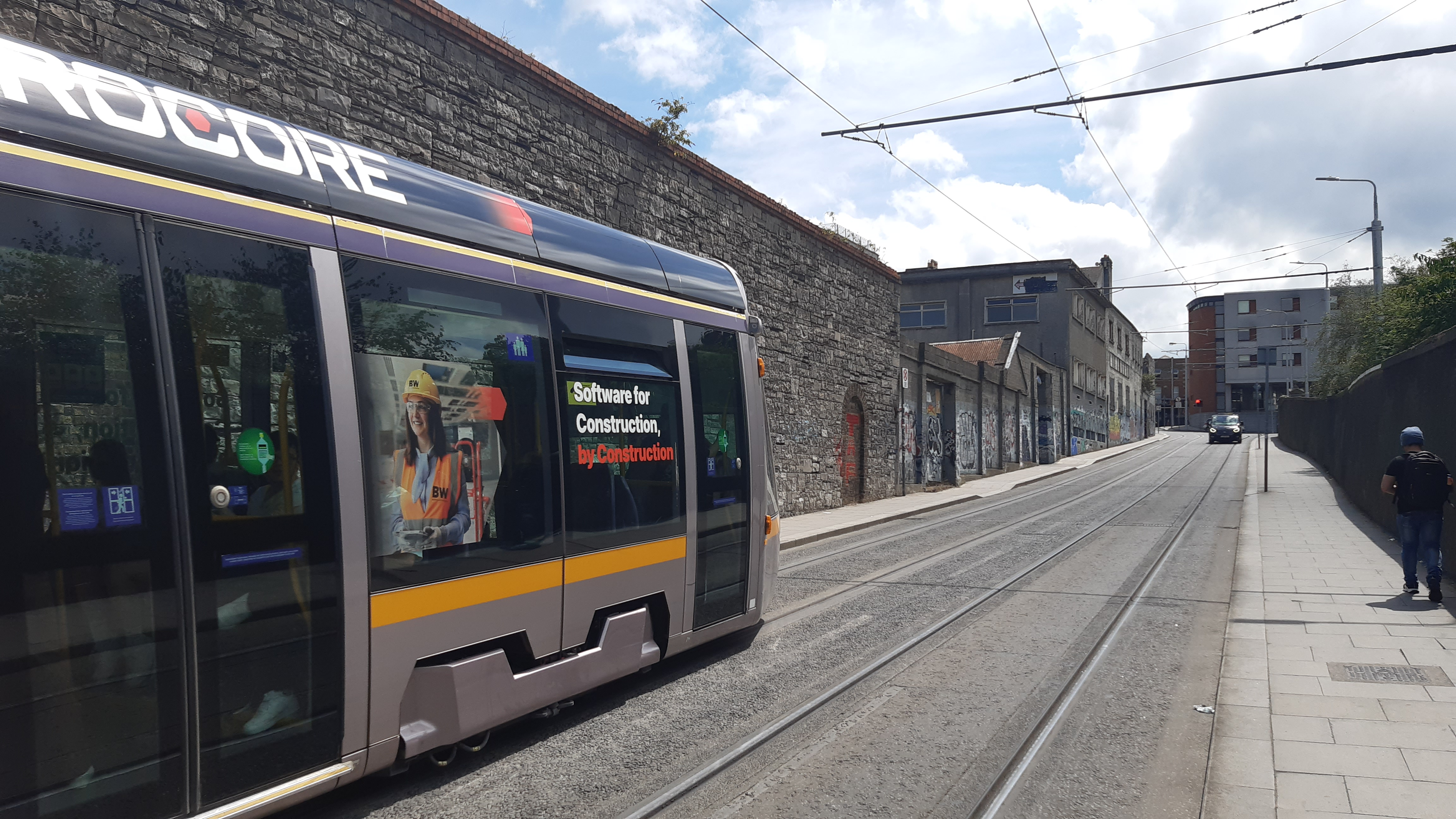
A Luas tram ascending the street

One of the first priorities of the trustees was to build a road, now known as Steeven's Lane, to run downhill from James's Street to the site. For convenience, the trustees continued the road to the bank of the Liffey across land which they acquired on lease from Henry Temple, 1st Viscount Palmerston. However, they did not obtain Temple's formal agreement to this arrangement and when the lease expired, the governors of the hospital found themselves involved in an expensive legal action.

The trustees also successfully petitioned Dublin Corporation for permission to establish a ferry across the river at the northern end of the lane, which remained a steady source of income for the hospital throughout the eighteenth century. The site of the ferry can be seen marked on John Rocque's 1756 map, "An Exact Survey of the City and Suburbs of Dublin". The ferry finally ceased to function after the construction of King's Bridge, now named Seán Heuston Bridge, in 1827.

In October 2011, a 35-year-old Polish man was struck and killed by a city-bound Luas tram descending the street.

== See also ==
- List of streets and squares in Dublin

== Sources ==
- Coakley, Davis (1992). Doctor Steevens' Hospital: A Brief History. Dublin: Doctor Steevens' Hospital Historical Centre. ISBN 0-9519822-0-6.
