= Samuel Clossy =

- Born: c. 1724; Dublin, Kingdom of Ireland
- Died: 22 August 1786 (aged 61–62); Dublin

Samuel Clossy MB MD (c. 1724 – 22 August 1786) was a pioneering Irish anatomist and the first college professor of a medical subject in North America.

== Early life and education ==
Samuel Clossy was born around 1724 in Dublin, Ireland. His parents were Bartholomew Clossy, a wealthy city merchant, and Anne Ogle. He was educated in Cashel, County Tipperary, entering Trinity College, Dublin (TCD), in 1739, sponsored by Dr William Stephens. He graduated with an MB in 1751. After some studying in London under the anatomist William Hunter, he was awarded his MD from TCD in 1755, and his licence of the Irish College of Physicians. He was elected a fellow of the College in 1761.

== Career ==
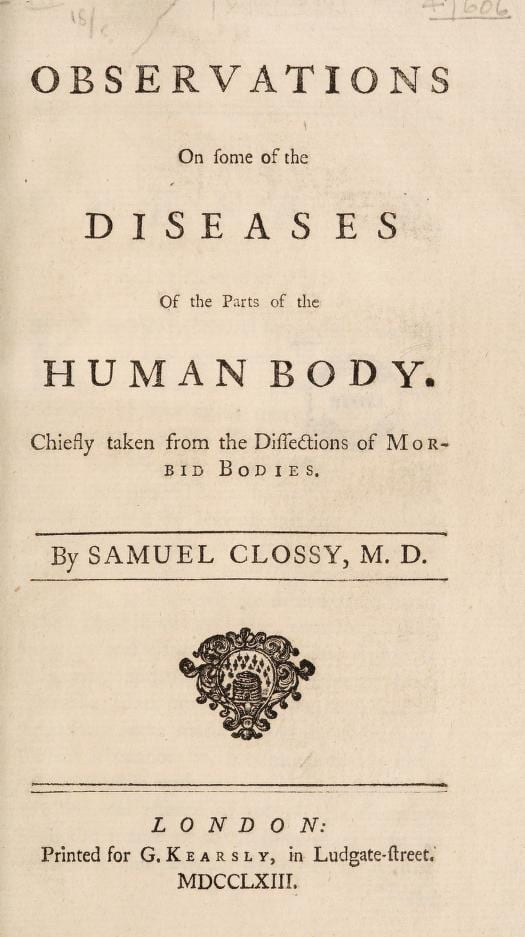
Observations On some of the Diseases Of the Parts of the Human Body by Clossy (1763)

At Dr Stephens' invitation Clossy undertook autopsy work in Dr Steevens' Hospital from 1752 to 1756, and was a member of the Medico-Philosophical Society, which gave him an expertise in pathology. He also contributed articles to Repository. After a period of unofficial work for Mercer's Hospital, he was appointed a physician there from 1762 to 1763. His 1763 Observations on some of the diseases of the parts of the body; chiefly taken from the dissection of morbid bodies is considered among the first systematic studies of pathology in the English language and drew on his work in Dr Steevens' Hospital and St George's Hospital, London.

He emigrated to New York in September 1763, where he had been promised a job at a planned military hospital. Having learnt that this hospital plan was floundering, he took up lecturing in anatomy, advertising the lectures in the New York Gazette and Post Boy on 17 November 1763 which were received "with delight". He was eventually employed as a tutor and then professor of natural philosophy in October 1765 at King's College. In 1767, he became the college's first professor of anatomy, making him the first college professor in a medical subject in North America. During his lectures, Clossy used the bodies of enslaved people for dissections. The American war of independence and his declining health led him to return to England late in 1780, where he spent 4 years trying unsuccessfully to find a new appointment. He addressed a sworn memorial to the Committee Appointed by Act of Parliament for Enquiring into the Losses and Services of the American Loyalists on 8 July 1784.

He retired to Dublin with a pension, dying there on 22 August 1786. He had been elected an honorary fellow of the Royal College of Physicians of Ireland in 1784. On 12 May 1759 he married Elizabeth Leech in St Andrew's Church, Dublin, who survived him along with a daughter.
