= James Paris du Plessis =

James Paris du Plessis (c. 1666 in Pithiviers, France – c. 1735 in London) was a servant of the famous 17th-century English diarist Samuel Pepys and the author of "A Short History of Human Prodigies, and Monstrous Births: of Dwarfs, Sleepers, Giants, Strong Men, Hermaphrodites, Numerous Births, and Extreme Old Age, &c.", an unpublished manuscript he produced between 1730 and 1733 that is preserved in the British Library in London.

Du Plessis' bizarre 320-page manuscript is illustrated with his own hand-coloured drawings. These include "John Grimes, a Dwarf", "Two Sisters conjoined", "A Woman Seven foot High", "A Woman with a Hog's Face", "A Spotted Negro Prince" and "The Monstrous Tartar". The section headed "A Wild Girl found Near Chalons in Champagne" contains the earliest-known report in English of Marie-Angélique Memmie Le Blanc, the famous feral child of 18th-century France. Shortly before his death, du Plessis offered the manuscript and its illustrations to Sir Hans Sloane and they became part of Sloane's foundational collection of the British Museum.

According to the novelist Charles Dickens, du Plessis' fascination with human strangeness and prodigies of all kinds began in his youth when he dug up the body of a stillborn two-headed child, a cousin, in the garden of his family home at Pithiviers in north-central France.
