= St. Patrick's Mental Health Services =

Irish mental health organisation

St. Patrick's Mental Health Services is a mental health organisation in Ireland, with over 700 staff members delivering 12% of the country's total in-patient care and treatment needs.

== Services ==
St. Patrick's provides a wide range of treatment programmes. These include programmes for mood disorders (depression and bipolar depression), anxiety disorder, an alcohol dependence / substance abuse programme, eating disorders, anorexia nervosa and bulimia, cognitive behavioural therapy, a young adult programme, an adolescent service, a dual diagnosis programme, a memory clinic and general mental health care.

It provides in patient services at St Patrick's University Hospital and at St Patrick's, Lucan (formerly St Edmundsbury Hospital).

It installed the first mental health Electronic Health Record (EHR) in Ireland, using Servelec's RiO solution for its eSwift EHR in September 2017. In July 2020, St Patrick's launched a service user portal using the Patient Knows Best patient portal solution.
