= St Patrick's University Hospital =

- St Patrick's Mental Health Services
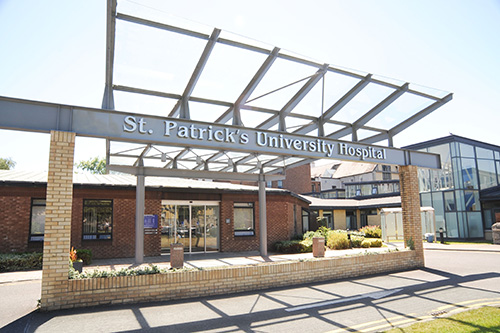
- St Patrick's University Hospital

- Shown in Dublin

Geography
- Location: Dublin, Ireland
- Coordinates: 53.344208°N 6.292592°W

Organisation
- Type: Specialist
- Affiliated university: Trinity College Dublin

Services
- Beds: 241
- Speciality: Psychiatric Hospital

History
- Founded: 1757

Links
- Lists: Hospitals in the Republic of Ireland

St Patrick's University Hospital (Irish: Ospidéal Ollscoile Naomh Pádraig) is a teaching hospital at Kilmainham in Dublin. The building, which is bounded by Steeven's Lane to the east, and Bow Lane West to the south, is managed by St Patrick's Mental Health Services.

== History ==
The hospital was founded with money bequeathed by the author Jonathan Swift following his death as "St. Patrick's Hospital for Imbeciles".

In March 1747, Dr. Steevens' Hospital agreed to provide a small amount of land fronting Bow Lane for the purposes of building St. Patrick's, however it was nearly three years afterwards before construction commenced, as the governors became involved in lengthy discussions over plans and architects. In considering the challenges of building such a hospital, it is important to remember that no such institution for housing lunatics had ever been built in Ireland before, and except for Bedlam in London, there was no comparable building in England either. The first step the governors agreed upon was for a high wall to be built around the site. This was achieved in 1747–48 at a cost of £146.

By 1753, the building (designed by George Semple) was completed, but the governors did not have the money to furnish it, to employ staff, or to maintain charity patients. Thus the building lay empty for another four years. On Monday 26 September 1757, the hospital finally admitted its first patients, consisting of six men and four women, referred to as 'pauper lunaticks' in hospital records.

In "Verses on the Death of Dr. Swift", the poet anticipated his own death:

He gave the little Wealth he had,

To build a House for Fools and Mad:
And shew'd by one satyric Touch,
No Nation wanted it so much:
That Kingdom he hath left his Debtor,

I wish it soon may have a Better.

Swift himself was declared of unsound mind by a Commission of Lunacy in 1742. Will Durant said of him: "He went a whole year without uttering a word."

Richard Leeper, who was appointed Resident Medical Superintendent in 1899, introduced a series of important initiatives including providing work and leisure activities for the patients. Norman Moore, who was appointed Resident Medical Superintendent in 1946, introduced occupational therapy, including crafts and farm work to the patients.

After the introduction of deinstitutionalisation in the late 1980s the hospital went into a period of decline. In 2008 the hospital announced the expansion of its outpatient services to a series of regional centres across Ireland. A mental health facility for teenagers known as the "Willow Grove Adolescent Inpatient Unit" opened at the hospital in October 2010.

== Services ==
The hospital, which is affiliated with Trinity College Dublin, has 241 inpatient beds.

== Sources ==
- Coakley, Davis (1992). Doctor Steevens' Hospital: A Brief History. Dublin: Doctor Steevens' Hospital Historical Centre. ISBN 0-9519822-0-6.
- Malcolm, Elizabeth (1989). Swift's Hospital: A History of St. Patrick's Hospital, Dublin, 1746-1989. Dublin: Gill and Macmillan. ISBN 0-7171-1501-1.
