= Linenhall, Dublin =

Former market hall and barracks in North Dublin city

Coordinates: 53°21′3.89″N 6°16′12.19″W

The Linen Hall
- A view of the Linenhall from around 1782 by the engraver Robert Pollard
- Interactive map of the The Linen Hall area

General information
- Type: Market Hall
- Architectural style: Georgian
- Classification: Demolished
- Location: Ireland
- Estimated completion: 1722
- Opened: 14 November 1728
- Renovated: 1784
- Demolished: 1916 by fire and later demolition

Technical details
- Material: granite arcades and quoins and plain red brick
- Floor count: 3

Design and construction
- Architects: Thomas Burgh (1722), Thomas Cooley (1784)
- Developer: The Linen Board
- Other designers: Henry Darley (1759) - stonemason, Charles Thorp

The Linenhall along with the adjacent Yarnhall was a large complex of Georgian buildings and streets associated with the linen and cloth trade in Dublin, Ireland which later gave its name to a surrounding area. It was also temporarily a barracks and as a result, was largely destroyed during the Easter Rising in 1916.

Today, streets built on or beside the site include Linenhall Street, Linenhall Parade, Linenhall Terrace, and Yarnhall Street. Other streets in the area were named for northern Irish towns related to the linen and flax industry, including Lurgan Street, Lisburn Street, and Coleraine Street.

== History ==
=== Foundation ===
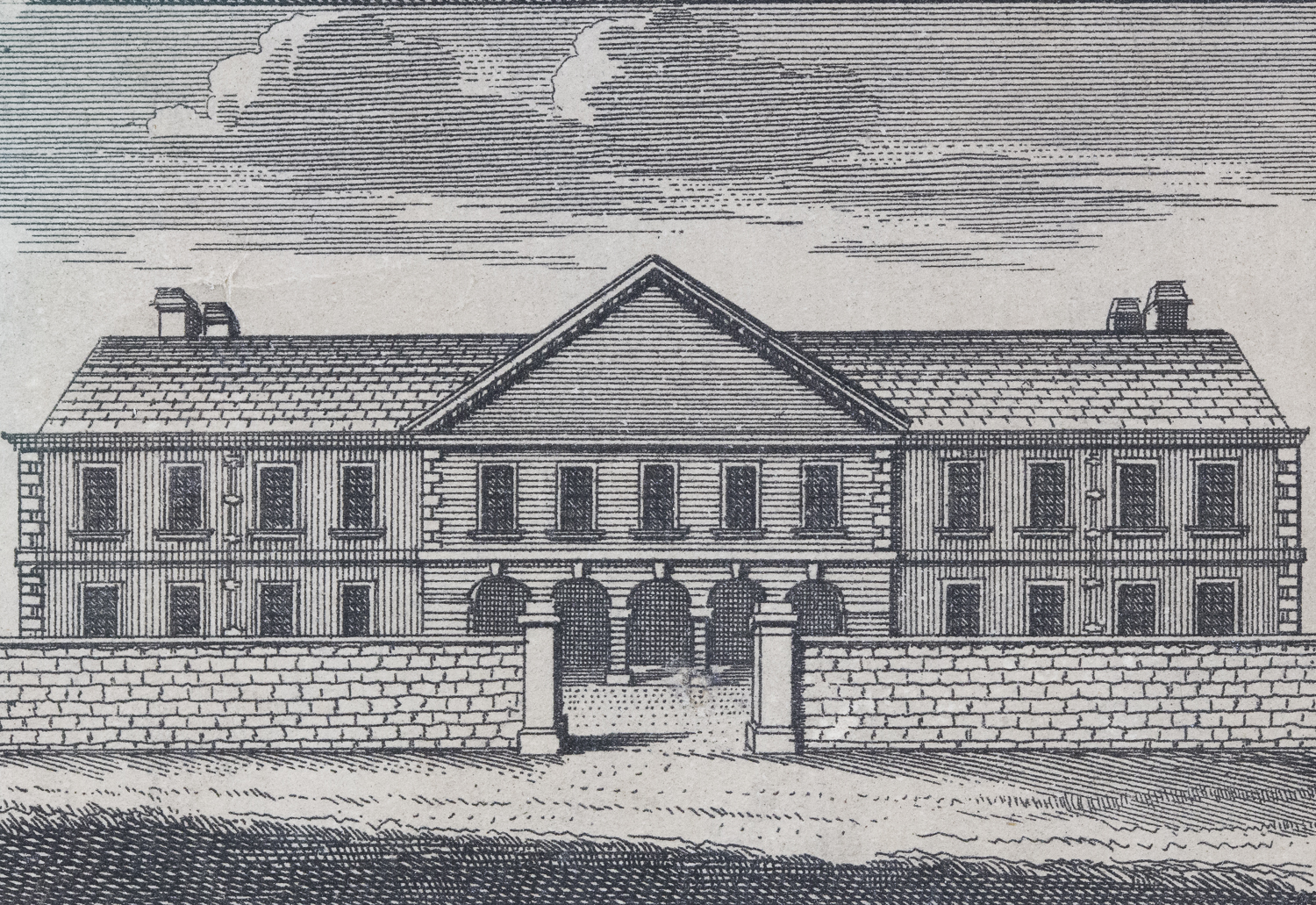
An illustration of the Linenhall taken from Charles Brooking's map of Dublin (1728)

The complex was located to the rear of Henrietta Street, Bolton Street and North King Street.

The selection of this three-acre site as a centralised Linen Hall for Dublin was decided by the Board on 17 March 1722 following the rejection of sites in Drumcondra and Ballybough. Thomas Burgh was chosen as architect and the first Linenhall constructed was opened for business on 14 November 1728. Yarnhalls and cottonhalls and other manufactories were later constructed and opened over the following years.

Many linen traders would stay in the inns and taverns in the environs of Capel Street at this time.

The complex was later extensively enlarged in 1784 by Thomas Cooley. A Yarn Hall and Cotton Hall were also constructed nearby.

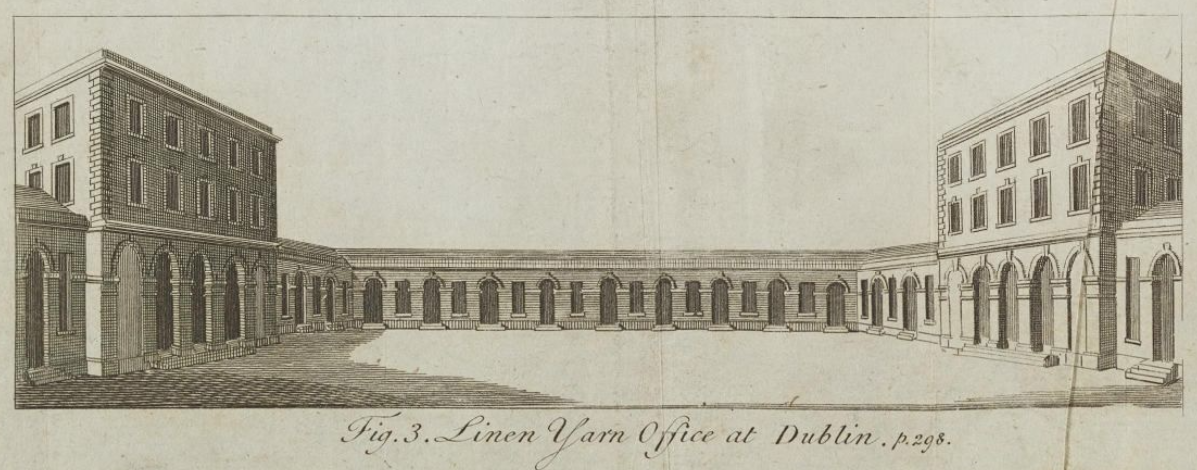
Linen Yarn office, from the Gentleman's Magazine in April 1786

The complex was modelled on Blackwell Hill, London, and the Cloth Hall of Hamburg. The Dublin Linenhall housed 550 bays for storage, a large trading space, and a boardroom. Following the opening of the Belfast Linen Hall in 1783, the Dublin Hall went into decline.

In 1821, George IV visited the Linenhall on his trip to Ireland and a statue of him was commissioned by the linen merchants and sculpted by Thomas Kirk.

The Linen Board was finally disbanded in 1828.

=== Barracks ===
From the 1870s, the Hall was used as a British Army barracks. The Board of Works took over the buildings in 1878.

In 1914, the Hall, along with the nearby Temple Gardens in front of the King's Inns, was host to one of its last events, the Dublin Civic Exhibition (1914).

It is mentioned in the 1958 song "Monto (Take Her Up to Monto)", which references events of the late 19th century: "You've seen the Dublin Fusiliers, / The dirty old bamboozeleers, / De Wet'll kill them chiselers, one, two, three. / Marching from the Linen Hall / There's one for every cannonball, / And Vicky's going to send them all, o'er the sea."

On 26 April 1916, Linenhall Barracks was seized by the Irish Volunteers. The Barracks was largely occupied by unarmed clerks. The Barracks was set on fire by 1st Dublin Battalion Irish Volunteers to prevent the British Army using the site. The fire spread to adjacent buildings on North Brunswick Street and North King Street. During the fire, Volunteer Paddy Holohan reported the fire leading to the explosion of several barrels of oil, creating large plumes of thick smoke.

== Area ==
The area known as Linenhall built up around the historical market hall, and the series of streets which now comprise the area reflect those connections, particularly with northern counties and areas of Ireland connected with the linen and cloth trade. Extant streets include Coleraine Street, Lurgan Street, and Lisburn Street. Derry Street to the north of Linenhall was built over when the hall expanded in 1781. There are also streets named for the building, Linenhall Street, Linenhall Terrace, Linenhall Parade, and Yarnhall Street.

== Present ==
Remnants of the original complex can be seen in the Linenhall campus of the Technological University Dublin off Yarnhall Street, which now houses the Schools of Architecture and Construction.

=== Gallery ===
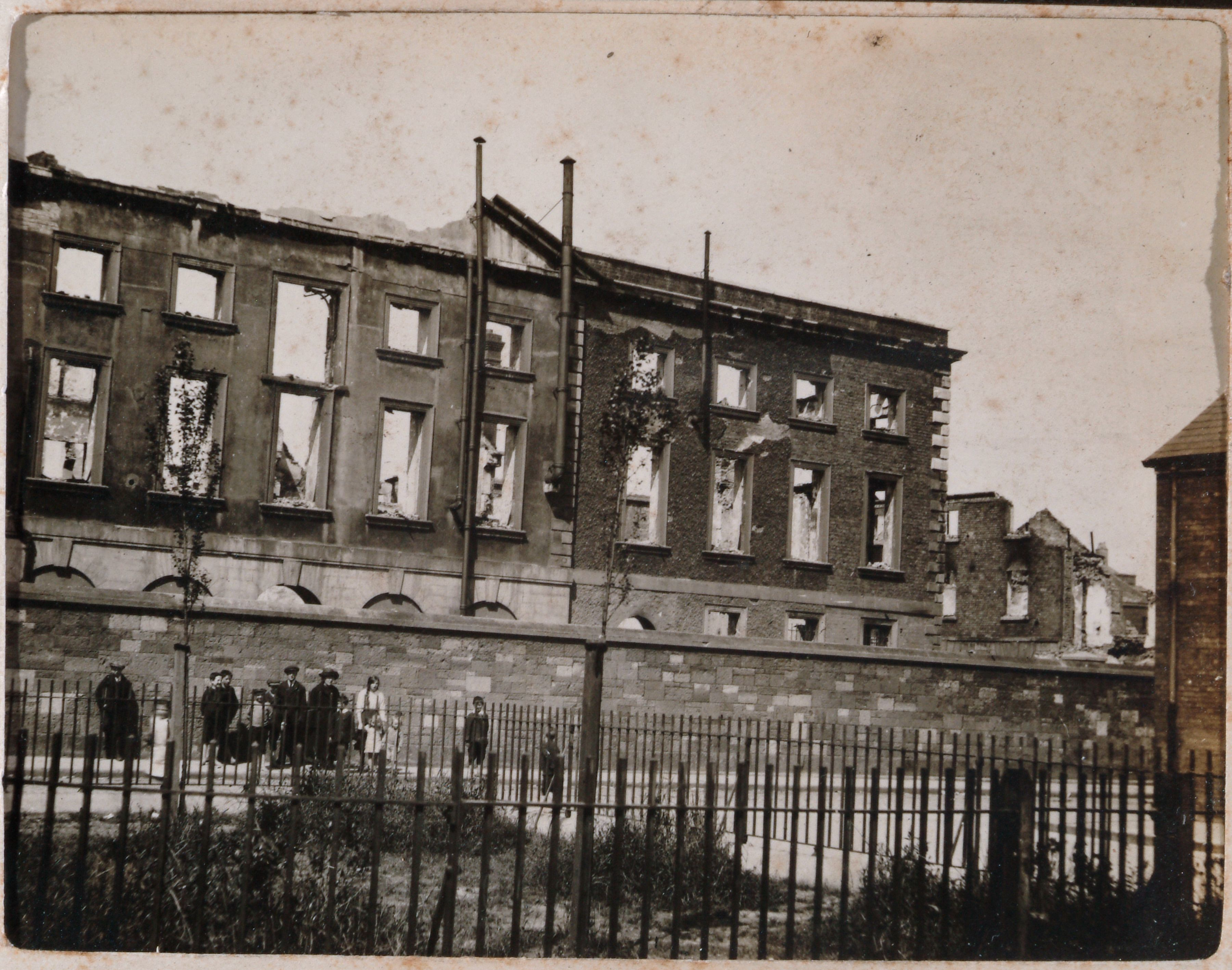
Front of the Linenhall

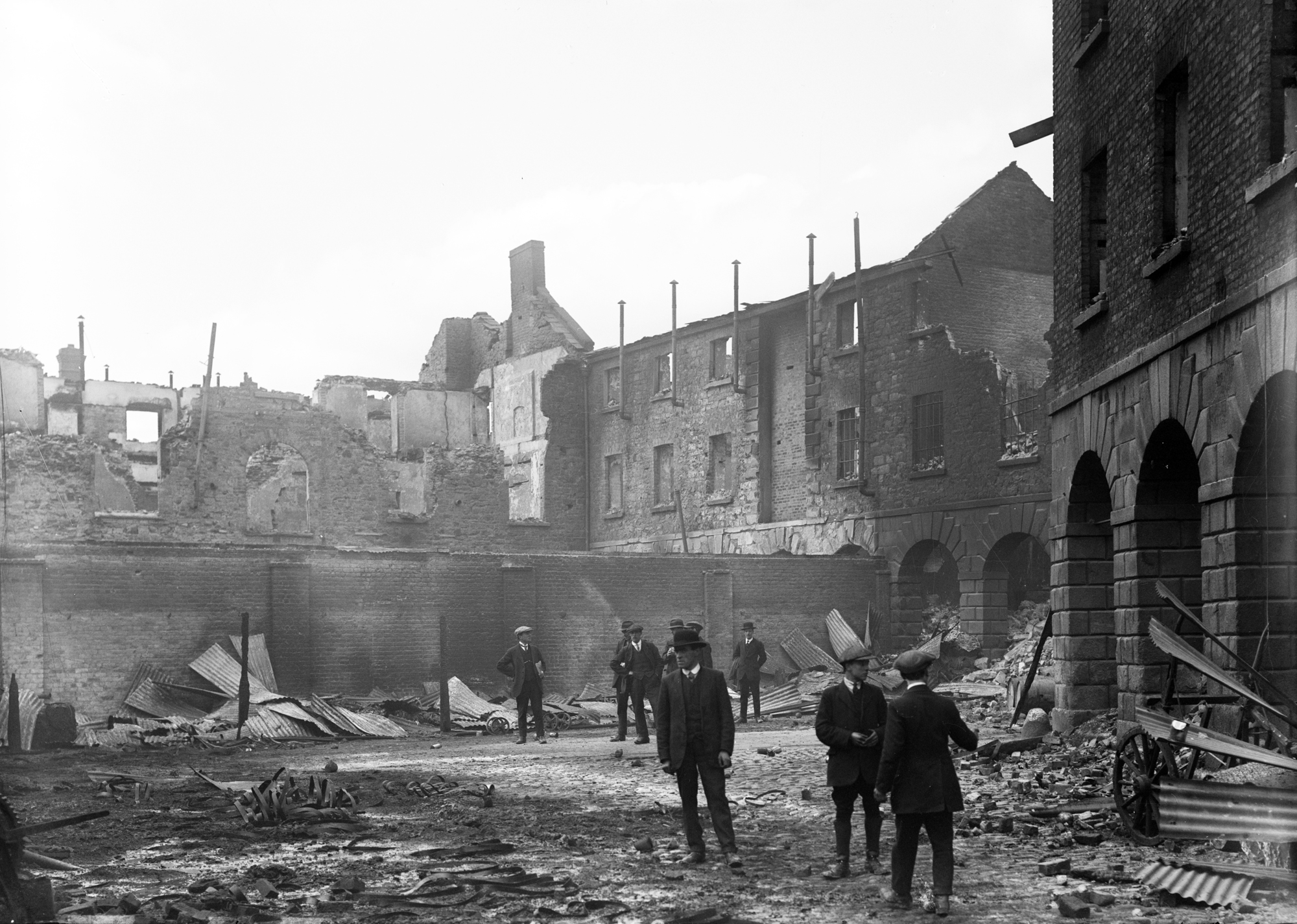
After its destruction in 1916.

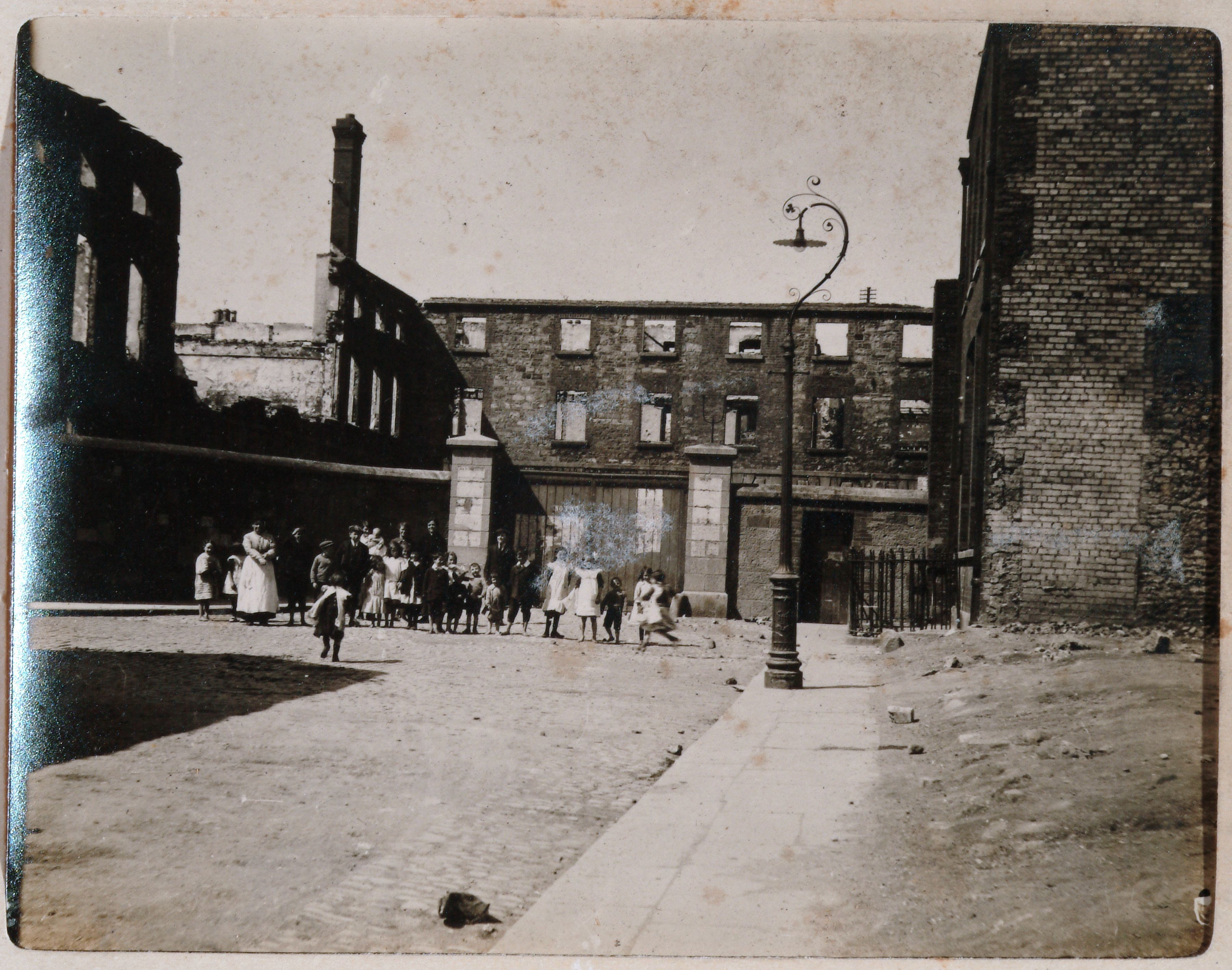
Gates with children playing

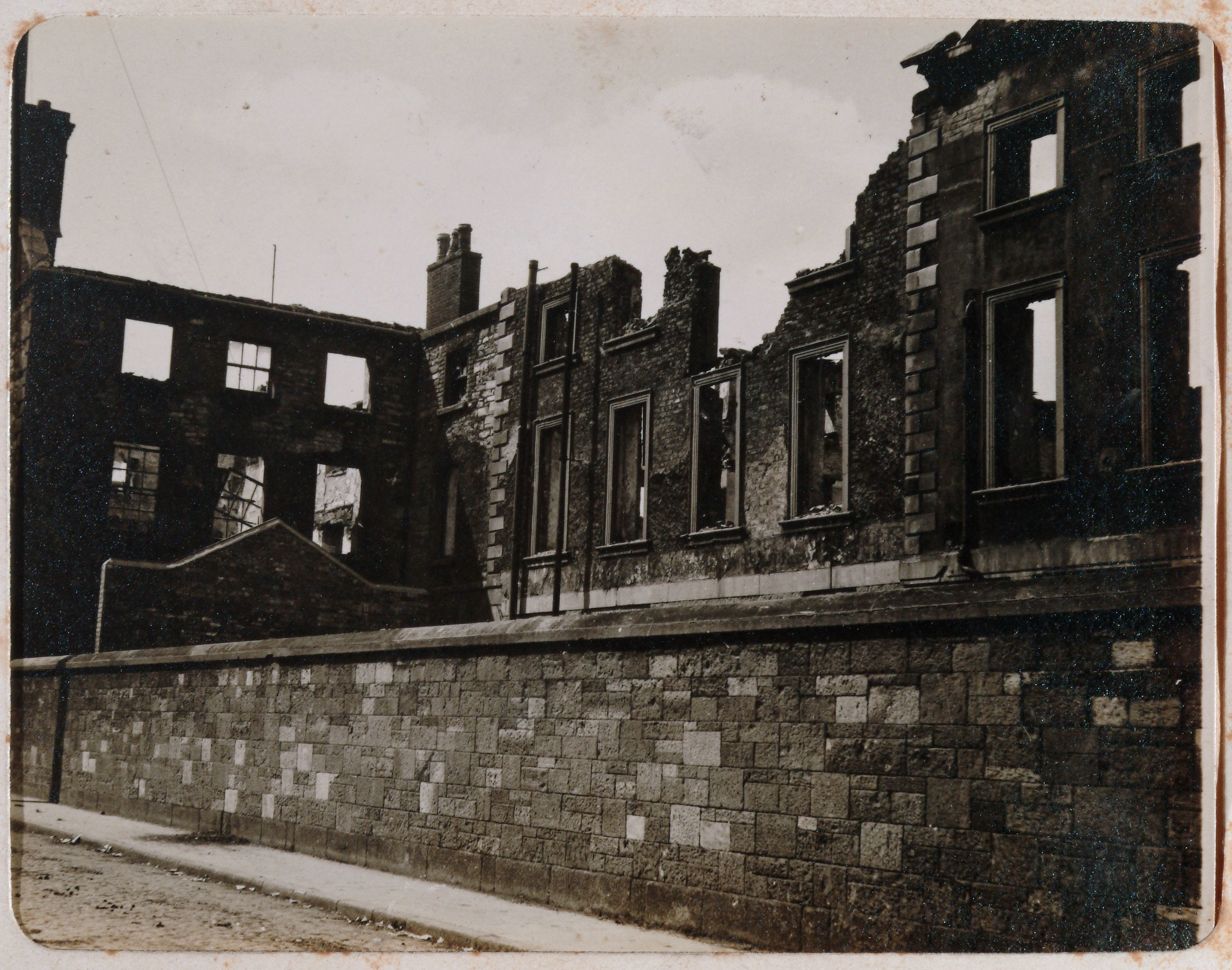
Boundary wall

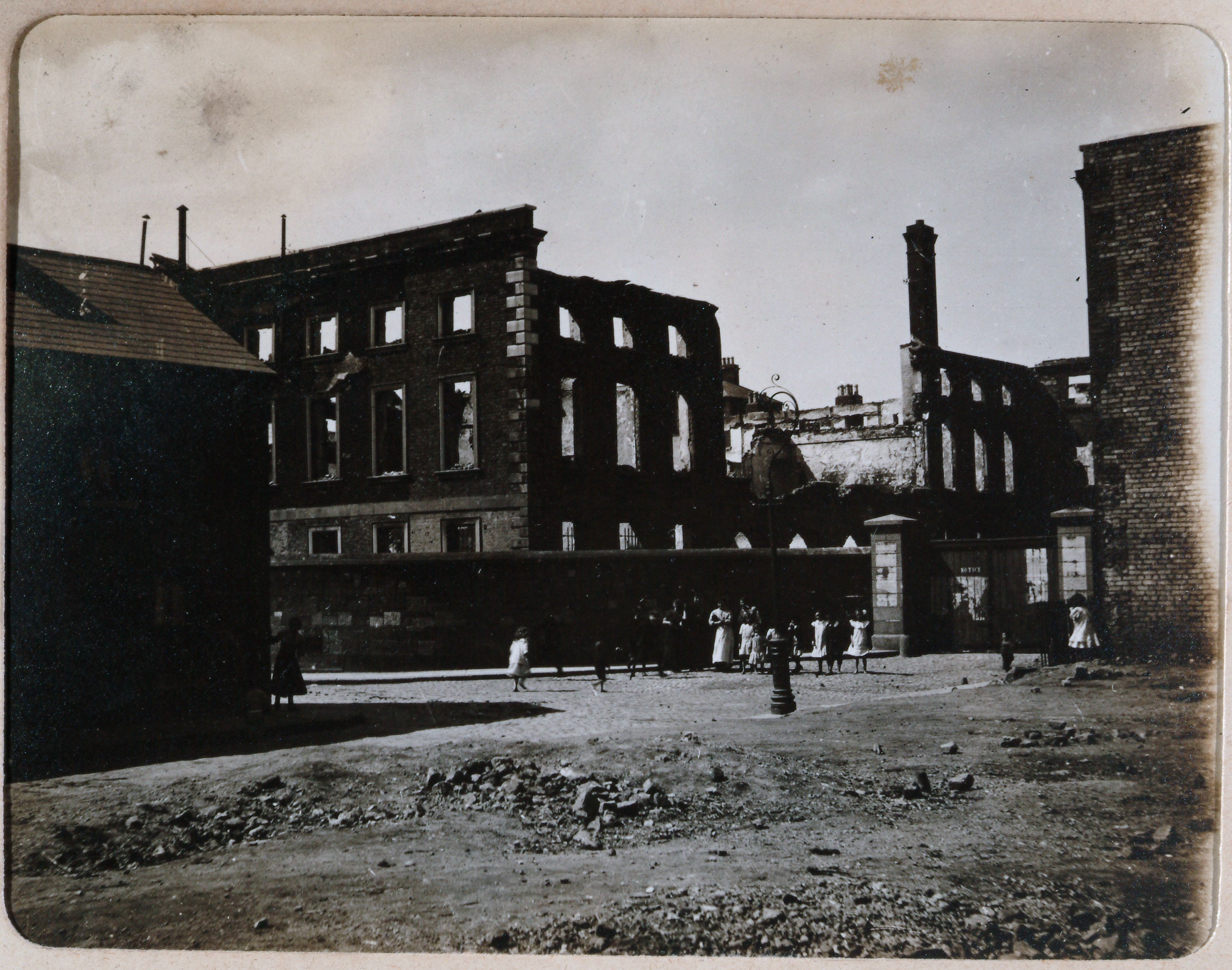
Gate

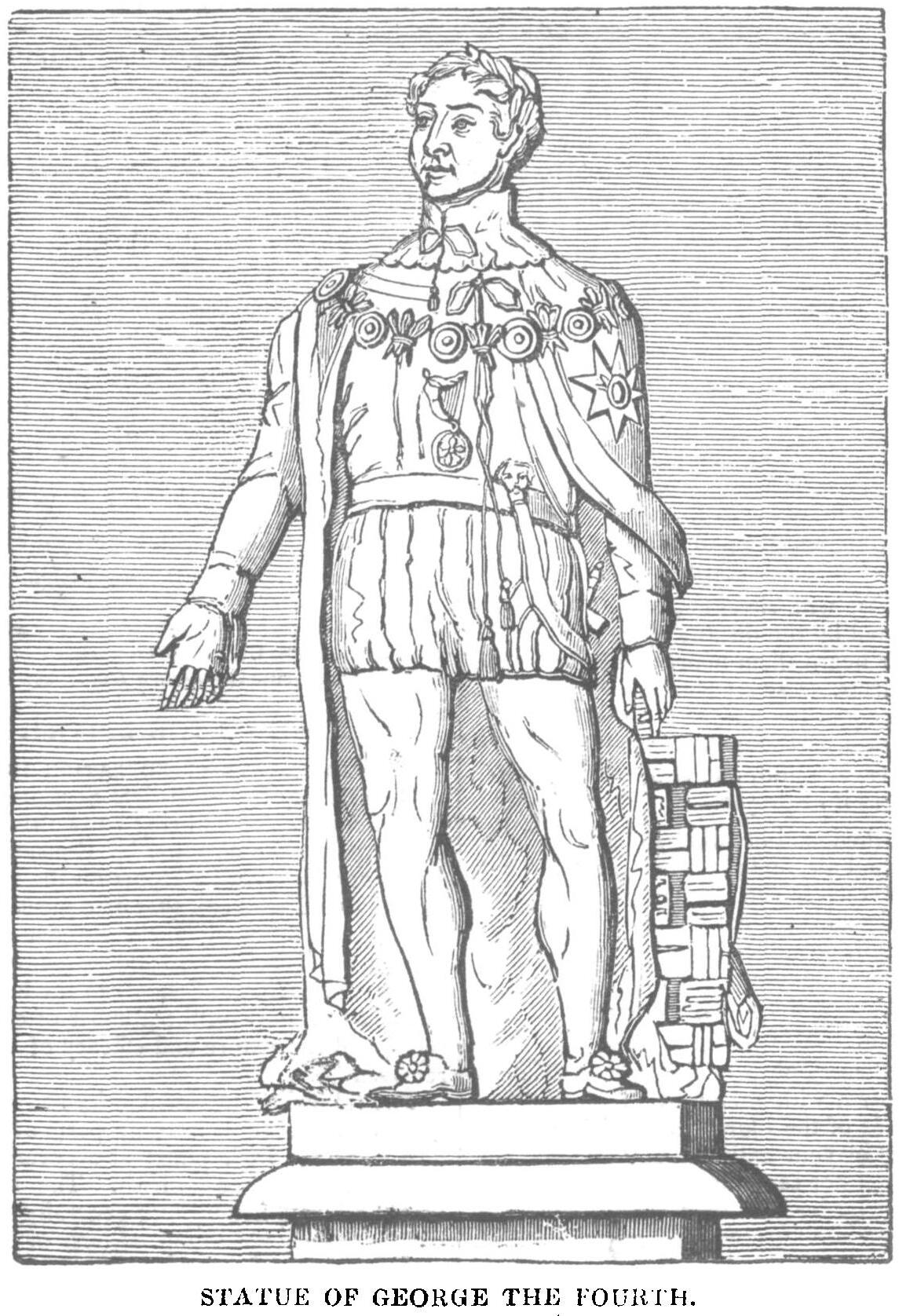
Black marble statue of George IV erected by the merchants to commemorate his visit in 1821

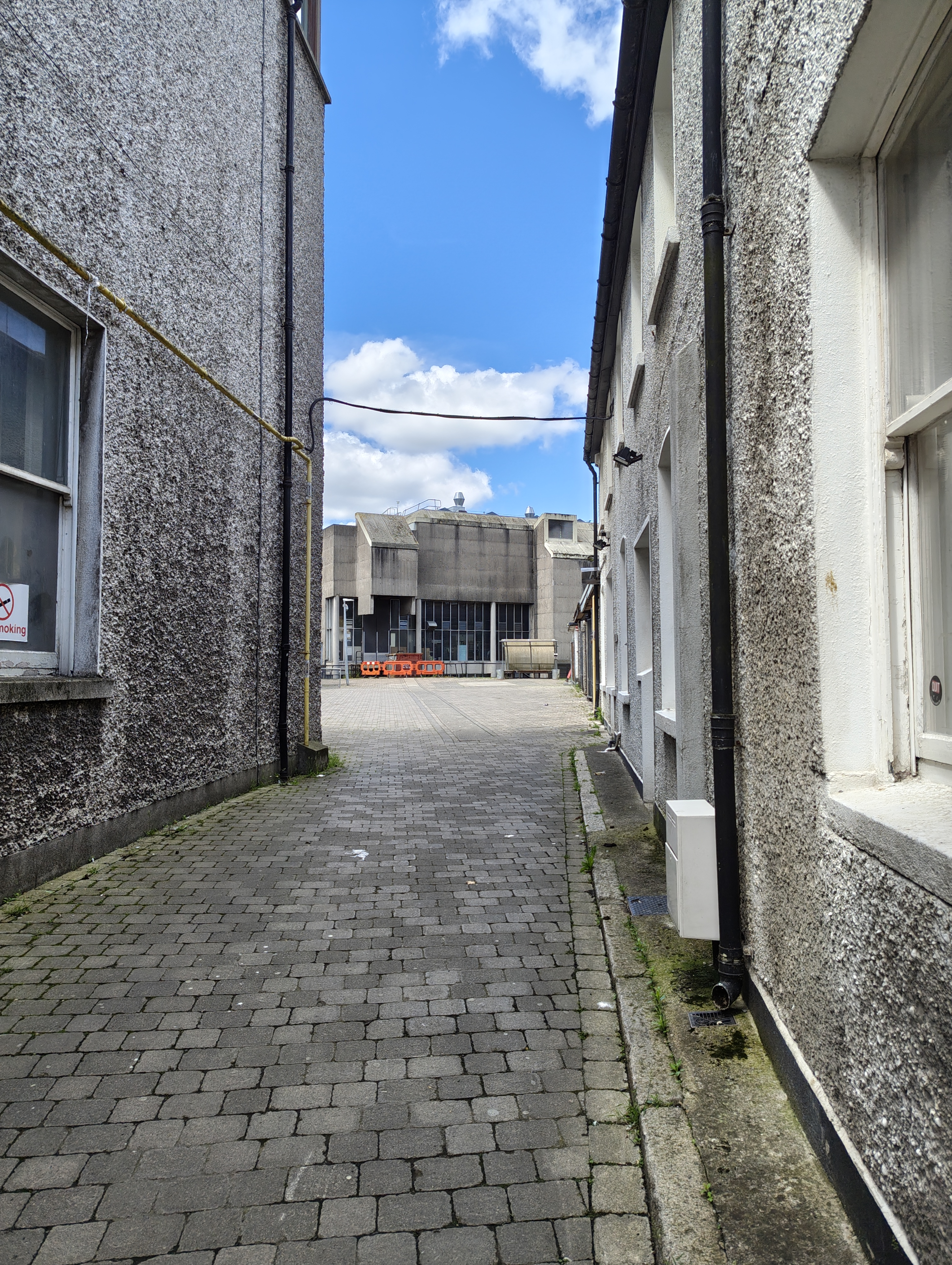
View into TU Dublin Linenhall campus from the gate at Yarnhall Street
