= Henrietta Street, Dublin =

Street in Dublin, Ireland

Henrietta Street
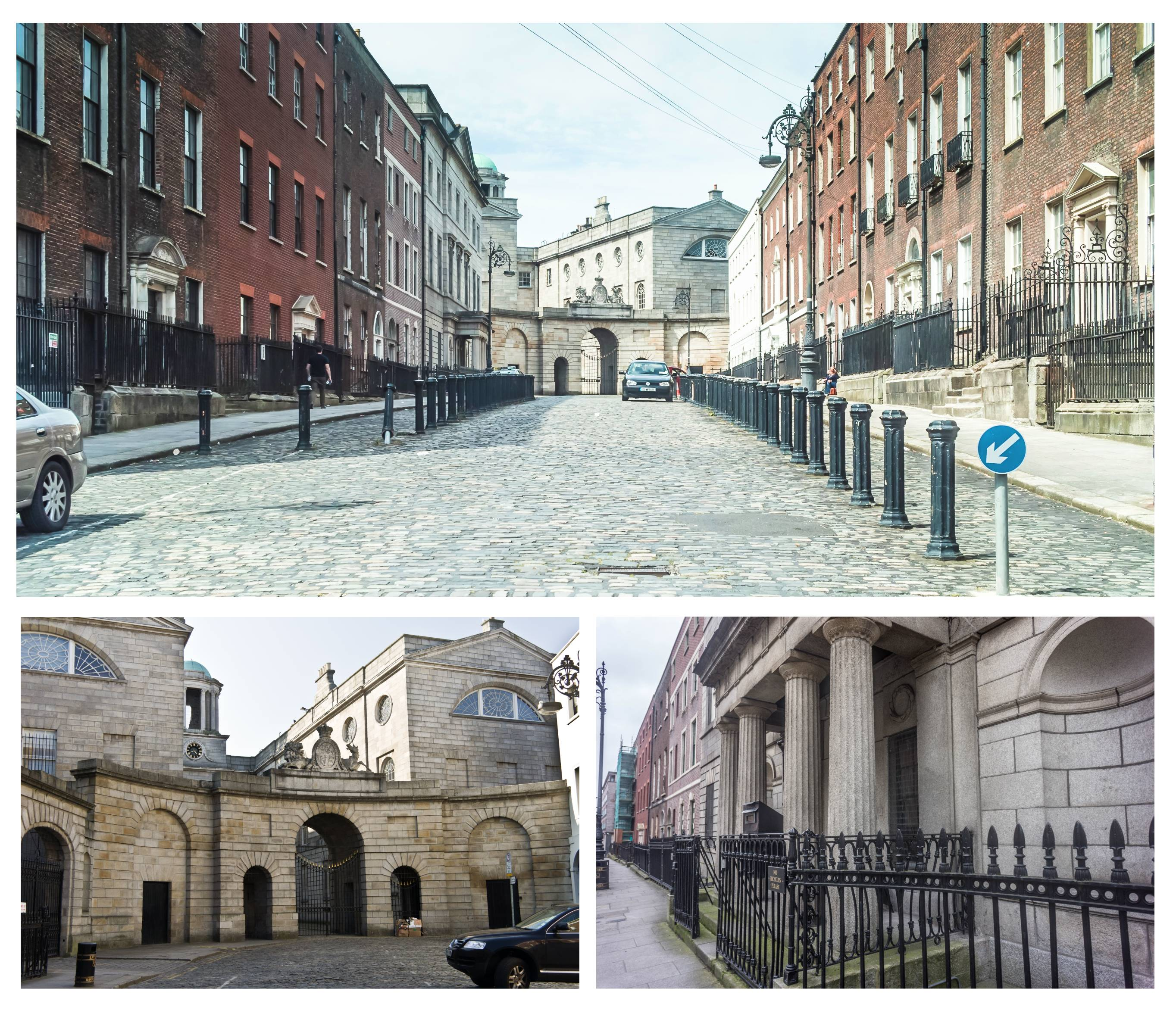
- Clockwise, top to bottom: Looking northwest towards Gandon's Kings Inns; a detail from a neoclassical portico along the street; the entrance to Gandon's King's Inns building

- Location within Central Dublin
- Native name: Sráid Henrietta (Irish)
- Namesake: Henrietta, Duchess of Grafton (1690–1726); or Henrietta Paulet, Duchess of Bolton (1697–1730)
- Length: 160 m (520 ft)
- Width: 17 metres (56 ft)
- Location: Dublin, Ireland
- Postal code: D01
- Coordinates: 53°21′09″N 6°16′12″W
- northwest end: Archway leading to King's Inns
- southeast end: Bolton Street

Other
- Known for: Georgian Dublin, tenements, 14 Henrietta Street

Henrietta Street (Irish: Sráid Henrietta) is a Dublin street, to the north of Bolton Street on the north side of the city, first laid out and developed by Luke Gardiner during the 1720s. A very wide street relative to streets in other 18th-century cities, it includes a number of very large red-brick city palaces and townhouses of Georgian design.

== Name ==
The street is generally held to be named after Henrietta (née Somerset; 1690–1726), the wife of Charles FitzRoy, 2nd Duke of Grafton, although an alternative candidate is Henrietta (née Crofts; 1697–1730), third wife of Charles Paulet, 2nd Duke of Bolton. The nearby Bolton Street is named after Paulet.

== History ==
Henrietta Street is the earliest Georgian street in Dublin, and at the forefront of Dublin's later Georgian streetscapes. Construction on the street started in the mid-1720s, on land bought by the Gardiner family in 1721. Construction was still taking place in the 1750s. Gardiner had a mansion, designed by Richard Cassels, built for his own use around 1730.

The street was popularly referred to as Primate's Hill, as one of the houses was owned by the Archbishop of Armagh, although this house, along with two others, was demolished to make way for the Law Library of King's Inns.

The street fell into disrepair during the 19th and 20th centuries, with the houses being used as tenements. While the houses on Henrietta Street had been home to a small number of wealthy residents in the 18th century, these were given-over to tenement use during the 19th century, and by 1911 there were 835 people living in poverty in just 15 houses.

The Dublin Civic Exhibition (1914) took place at the King's Inns and the Linenhall complex with entrance for the public via Henrietta Street.

A number of houses on the street remained in use as tenements until the 1970s. In the late 20th and early 21st centuries, the street has been subject to restoration efforts.

The street has been used as a period-location for film and TV companies, with productions filmed including Albert Nobbs, Inspector George Gently and Foyle's War.

The street is a cul-de-sac, with the Law Library of King's Inns facing onto its western end. As of 2017, there are 13 houses on the street. One of these houses, 14 Henrietta Street, was opened as a museum in late 2018. 14 Henrietta Street tells the story of the building and of the lives of the people who lived there. A plaque at the address commemorates its association with Irish republican Thomas Bryan.

== First residents ==
The street was initially popular with landed and merchant families, and a number of hereditary peers had properties on the street in the mid-18th century. The houses were built to have rear gardens and mews.

| Number | Resident | Year of construction | Comment | Image |
|---|---|---|---|---|
| 3 | Owen Wynne | | Owen Wynne's country house was at Hazelwood House, Sligo. | |
| 4 | John Maxwell, 1st Baron Farnham | 1755 | Resident from 1757, father-in-law of Owen Wynne at number 3. This house remained in the possession of the same family until 1852. | |
| 5 | Henry O'Brien, 8th Earl of Thomond. | 1741 | Built by Nathaniel Clements, Thomond died two years later and the house was occupied by George Stone, Bishop of Ferns, who later succeeded Boulter as Primate | |
| 6 | | 1741 | Separate flat within Number 5 | |
| 7 | Nathaniel Clements | 1738 | Built by Nathaniel Clements for himself | |
| 8 | Lieutenant General Richard St George | 1735 | | |
| 9 | Thomas Carter | 1735 | Designed by Edward Lovett Pearce and built for Luke Gardiner by 1735 | |
| 10 | Luke Gardiner | 1735 | Designed by Edward Lovett Pearce | |
| 11 | Brigadier General William Graham | | Designed by Edward Lovett Pearce as a pair for Luke Gardiner with number 12 | |
| 12 | William Stewart, 3rd Viscount Mountjoy and later 1st Earl of Blessington | | Designed by Edward Lovett Pearce as a pair for Luke Gardiner with number 11 | |
| 13 | Nicholas Loftus, 1st Earl of Ely | | Numbers 13, 14 and 15 were built together by Luke Gardiner. Occupied from 1755. | |
| 14 | Richard 3rd Viscount Molesworth | | Numbers 13, 14 and 15 were built together by Luke Gardiner. It now operates as a museum named 14 Henrietta Street. Occupied by Richard 3rd Viscount Molesworth from around 1752. | |
| 15 | Sir Robert King | | Numbers 13, 14 and 15 were built together by Luke Gardiner. Occupied by Robert King from around 1748. Now occupied by Na Píobairí Uilleann. Half of the original building was demolished. | |
| | Hugh Boulter | 1729 | Built from 1724-29 as the residence of the Archbishop of Armagh Hugh Boulter. It was allowed to decay and replaced with the site of the King's Inns library built from 1824-32. Two other houses were also demolished for its construction. | |

== See also ==
- Georgian Dublin
- List of streets and squares in Dublin
