= The Cobblestone =

Irish traditional music bar in Smithfield, Dublin

Coordinates: 53°20′59″N 6°16′40″W

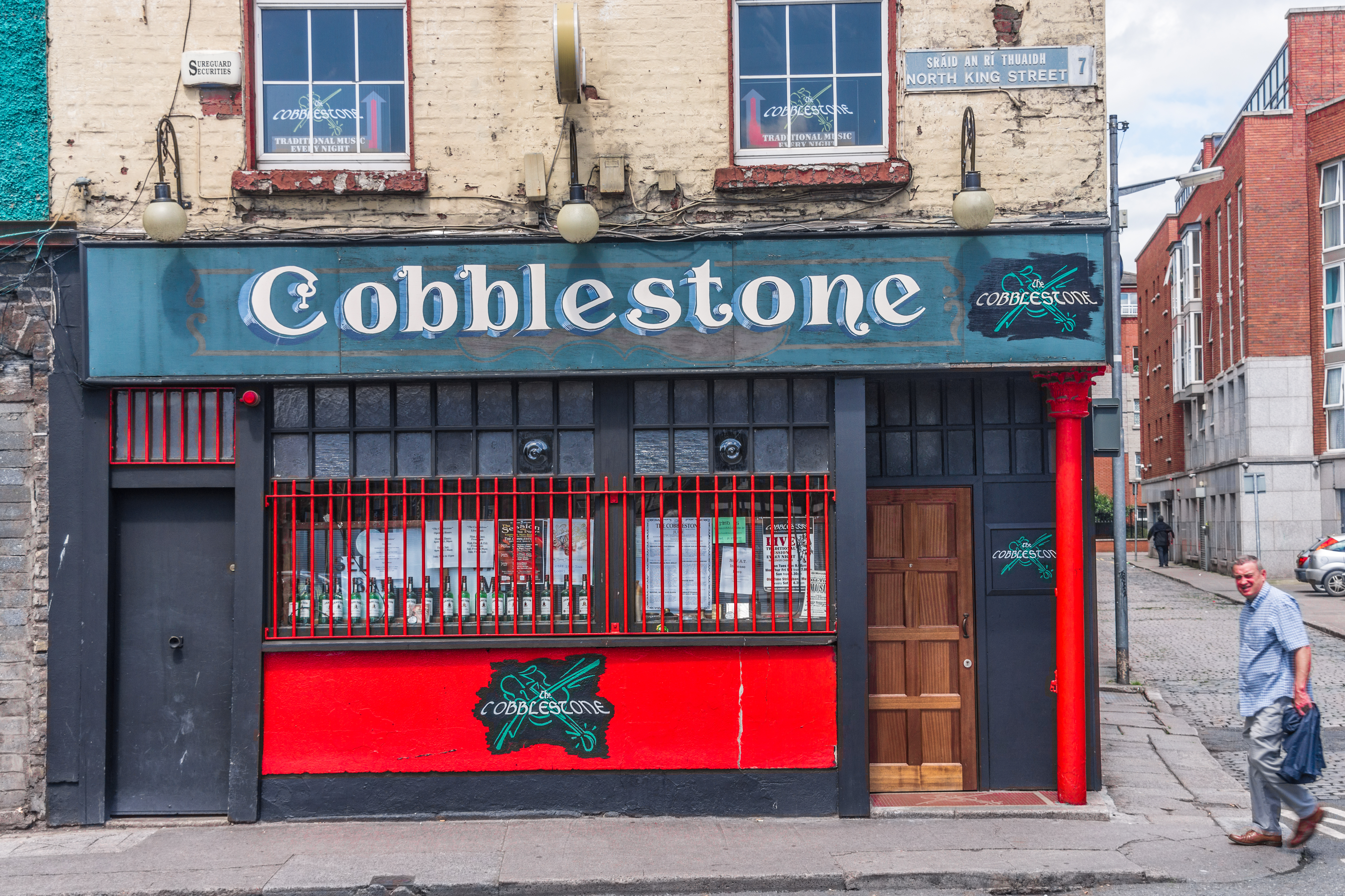
- The pub in 2012
- Interactive map of The Cobblestone
- Address: 77 North King Street, Smithfield, Dublin, D07 TP22
- Location: Smithfield, Dublin
- Operator: Tom Mulligan

Website
- Official website

The Cobblestone is a pub in Smithfield, Dublin, renowned for its live Irish traditional music. The pub has been run by the Mulligan family since 1987. It hosts multiple music sessions a day, and is primarily sustained by the tourist trade.

In 2021 it was under threat of closure as part of a redevelopment plan to convert its rear venue room and outside area and surrounding buildings into a nine-storey hotel but Dublin City Council denied the scheme planning permission after public outcry and protest. The protests, which involved John Francis Flynn, Ispíní na hÉireann and over 400 others, caused Gardaí to shut down the quays of the Liffey.

Performers and visitors to the pub have included The Chieftans, Mary Black with Steve Martin supporting on banjo, comic Billy Connolly, chef Anthony Bourdain, actor Jon Voight and musician Manu Chao.

The Guardian named The Cobblestone as "Ireland's most famous traditional music pub" in 2021. Condé Nast Traveller described its sessions as "some of the best live traditional music you’ll hear anywhere". In 2023, the pub was the subject of an RTÉ documentary, Athbhaile. Later that year, it was featured in The New York Times's coverage of the sessions held in the wake of Shane MacGowan's death. In 2024, the pub was featured in Mega Dreoilín, a videogame art exhibition depicting the city's gentrifiction.
