= St. Paul's Church, Dublin =

There are two churches in Dublin named St. Paul's Church:

- St. Paul's (Roman Catholic) Church, Dublin
- St. Paul's Church (Church of Ireland)
