= Dixie Blundell =

Anglican priest

Dixie Blundell, D.D.(1725–1808) was an 18th-century Anglican priest in Ireland.

He was born in Dublin, the son of Ralph and Jane (Coddington) Blundell, and educated at Trinity College, Dublin. Blundell was Rector of St Paul's Smithfield, Dublin. Blundell was appointed Precentor to the Bishop of Kilmacduagh in 1771; a prebendary of Clonfert in 1771; and a prebendary of Christ Church Cathedral, Dublin in 1775. He was Dean of Kildare from 1782 until his death.

Dr Blundell died on 2 November 1808 at his house in Granby Row, Dublin, and is buried in St. Michans.
