= Mega Dreoilín =

Irish art exhibition and 2024 video game

- Developers: Han Hogan, Donal Fullam
- Release: May 2024

Mega Dreoilín is an art project in the form of a 16-bit video game created by Han Hogan and Donal Fullam under the nom d'art Namaco. It was shown in exhibition in Pallas Projects/Studios in The Liberties, Dublin in May 2024. In the game, the player navigates the Irish housing crisis, encountering characters including James Connolly, Manchán Magan, Ian Lynch and Rory Hearne, and locations such as The Cobblestone and Guineys. It was inspired by games such as Splatterhouse, Golden Axe, Streets of Rage, Final Fight and Shinobi III, and built using the Unreal Engine and Godot.

In The Irish Times, Una Mullally hailed the game as "one of the best Irish artworks of 2024 so far... incredibly engaging, brilliantly designed, sophisticated in its form and execution, and unexpectedly moving." Scout Magazine described it as "so dang clever", "well-executed and entertaining" and "supremely well-researched". The game was selected for the 14th instance of the Periodical Review series, as one of the pieces from the previous year that best epitomise the state of Irish contemporary art. Reviewing the selection for The Irish Times, Tom Lordan described it as "ingenious", and a highlight of the Periodical Review exhibition.
