= 14 Henrietta Street =

Museum in Dublin, Ireland

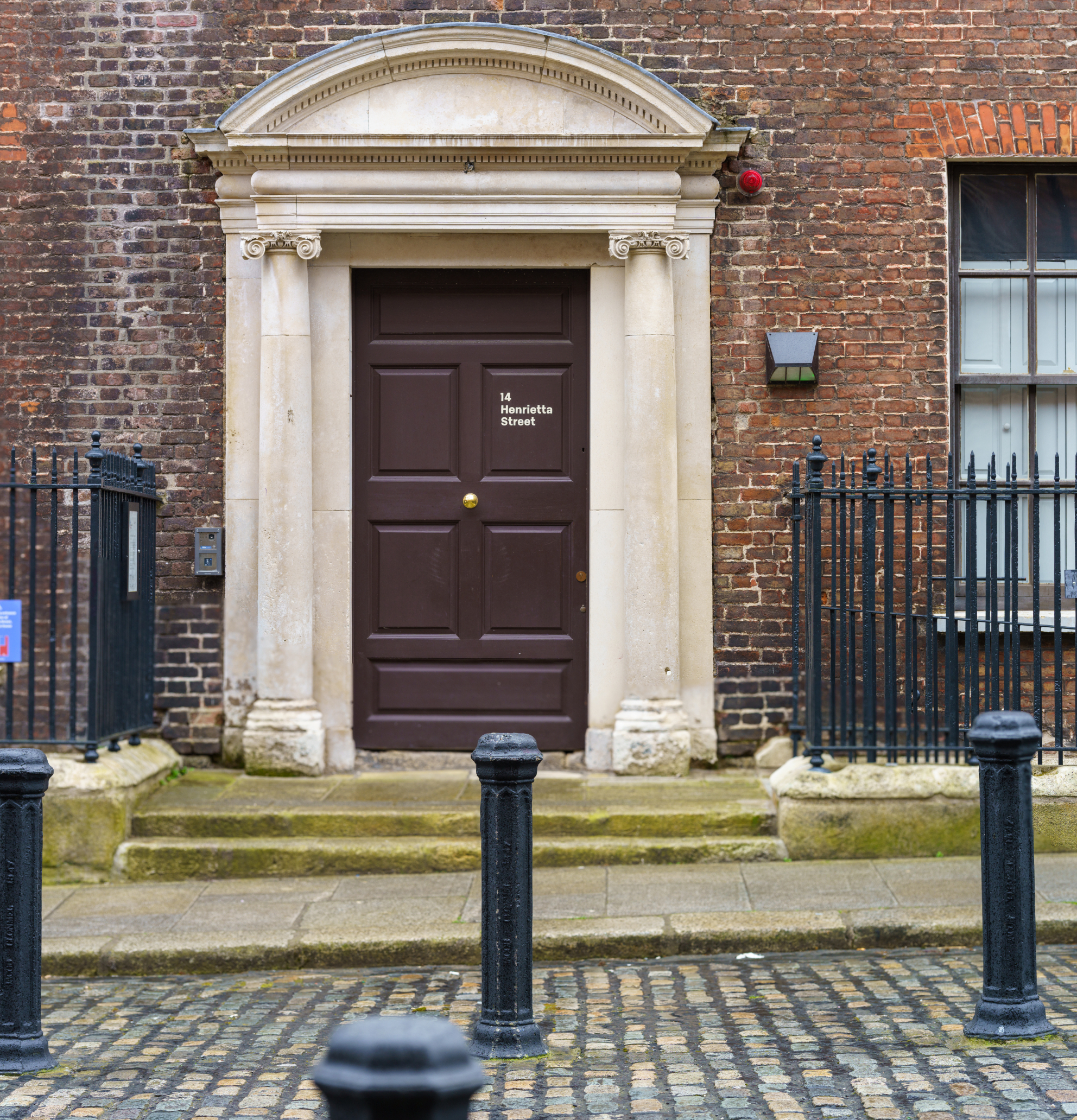
- The Tenement Museum, 14 Henrietta Street

- Location within Central Dublin
- Established: September 2018
- Location: 14 Henrietta Street, Dublin, Ireland
- Coordinates: 53.3523486°N 6.2701543°W
- Type: Tenement, Georgian
- Website: 14henriettastreet.ie

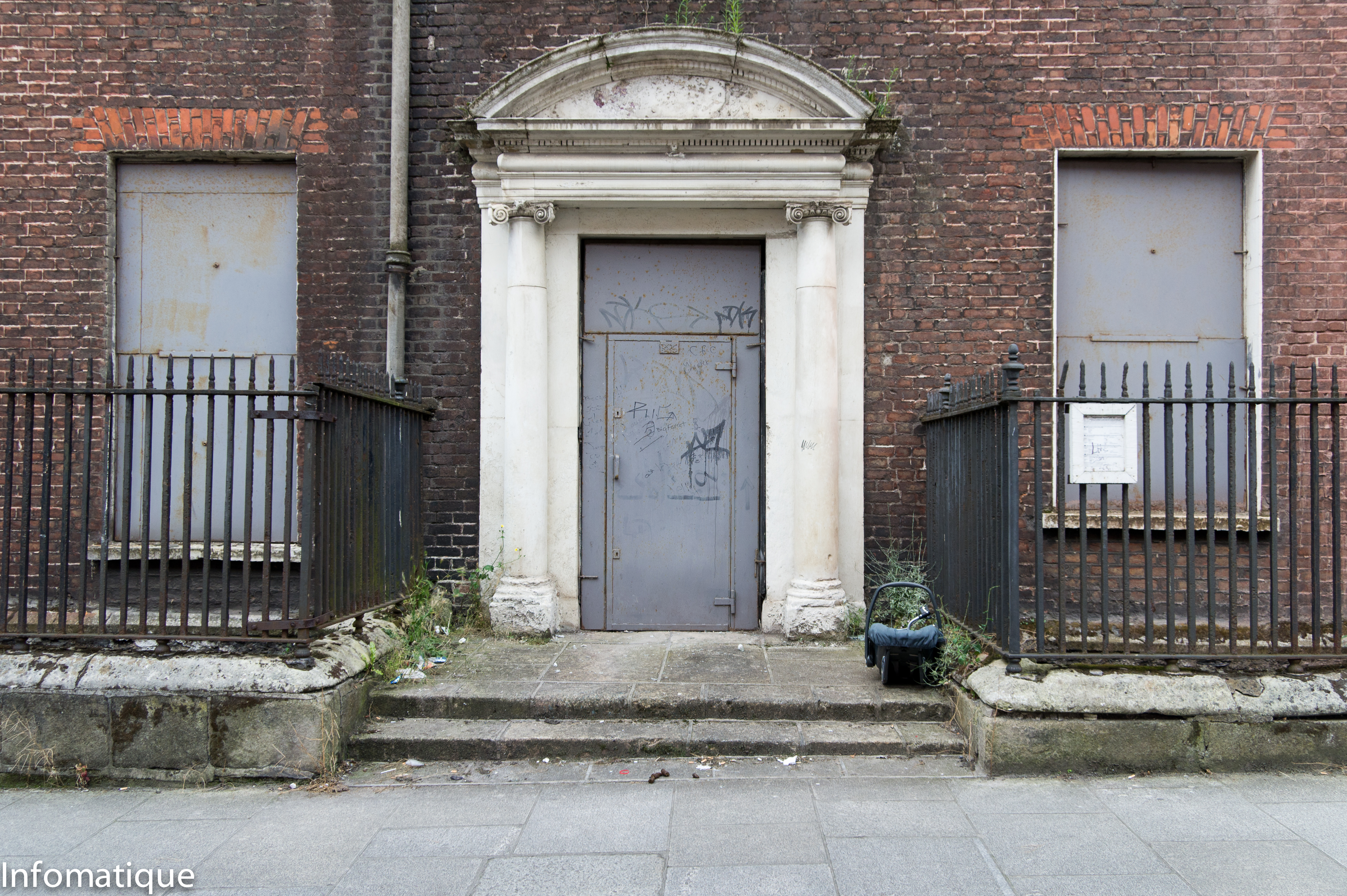
Entrance to 14 Henrietta Street in August 2011 (before restoration)

14 Henrietta Street is a social history museum located on Henrietta Street in Dublin, Ireland. The museum, which is sometimes referred to as the Tenement Museum, opened in September 2018. It tells the story of how the building turned into tenements after its Georgian times and of the many residents who occupied this house throughout the years.

== History ==
Construction of Henrietta Street began in the 1720s, on land bought by Luke Gardiner. Numbers 13, 14 and 15 were built in the late 1740s by Gardiner as a speculative enterprise. Number 14's first occupant was Lord Richard Molesworth and his second wife Mary Jenney Usher. Other notable residents in the late 18th century included Lord John Bowes, Sir Lucius O'Brien, Sir John Hotham, and Viscount Charles Dillon.

After the Act of Union in 1800, Dublin entered a period of economic decline. 14 Henrietta Street was occupied by lawyers, courts and a barracks during the 19th century. By 1877, a landlord called Thomas Vance had removed its grand staircase and divided it into 17 tenement flats of one, three and four rooms. An advert in The Irish Times from 1877 read: "To be let to respectable families in a large house, Northside, recently papered, painted and filled up with every modern sanitary improvement, gas and wc on landings, Vartry Water, drying yard and a range with oven for each tenant; a large coachhouse, or workshop with apartments, to be let at the rere. Apply to the caretaker, 14 Henrietta St.

In the 1920s, Irish Republican Army volunteer Thomas Bryan lived at the address. In March 2023, a plaque was unveiled by Dublin City Council in his memory.

Restoration work began in 2006 and took over ten years to complete. 14 Henrietta Street is owned and was restored by Dublin City Council, but is operated by the Dublin City Council Culture Company. The house has been restored to show the original Georgian period through to its final incarnation as a tenement.

== Tenements ==
The tenements in Dublin were usually 18th or 19th century townhouses that were adapted, normally very poorly, to make flats that would house many families and it would normally be one family living in a room that would be divided into a kitchen, sitting room and a bedroom. These tenements were located in the north inner city of Dublin, and also on the Southside near the Liberties and around the south docklands. By the end of the 19th century, many people lived in the Georgian houses on Henrietta Street. At the end of the 1970s, there were not many people still living in 14 Henrietta Street and out of the seventeen flats, many of them had emptied over time or were renovated into bigger ones. At the end of this period, a few temporary tenancies and some squatters had replaced the community of families that once lived there. In 1979, 14 Henrietta Street was closed down permanently as tenements.

== Museum ==
The 14 Henrietta Street museum is based in an 18th-century Georgian townhouse. The museum shares the story of how the building turned into a tenement house after it was once a residence for some of Dublin's most elite citizens. The museum, which opened in 2018, has received a number of awards, including the Siletto Prize for community engagement at the European museum of the Year Awards in 2020. The museum also won two RIAI Irish Architecture awards, in 2018, for the best conservation project and the best overall project nationally. In 2024 the museum won an RIAI silver medal for Conservation and Restoration.

== Gallery ==
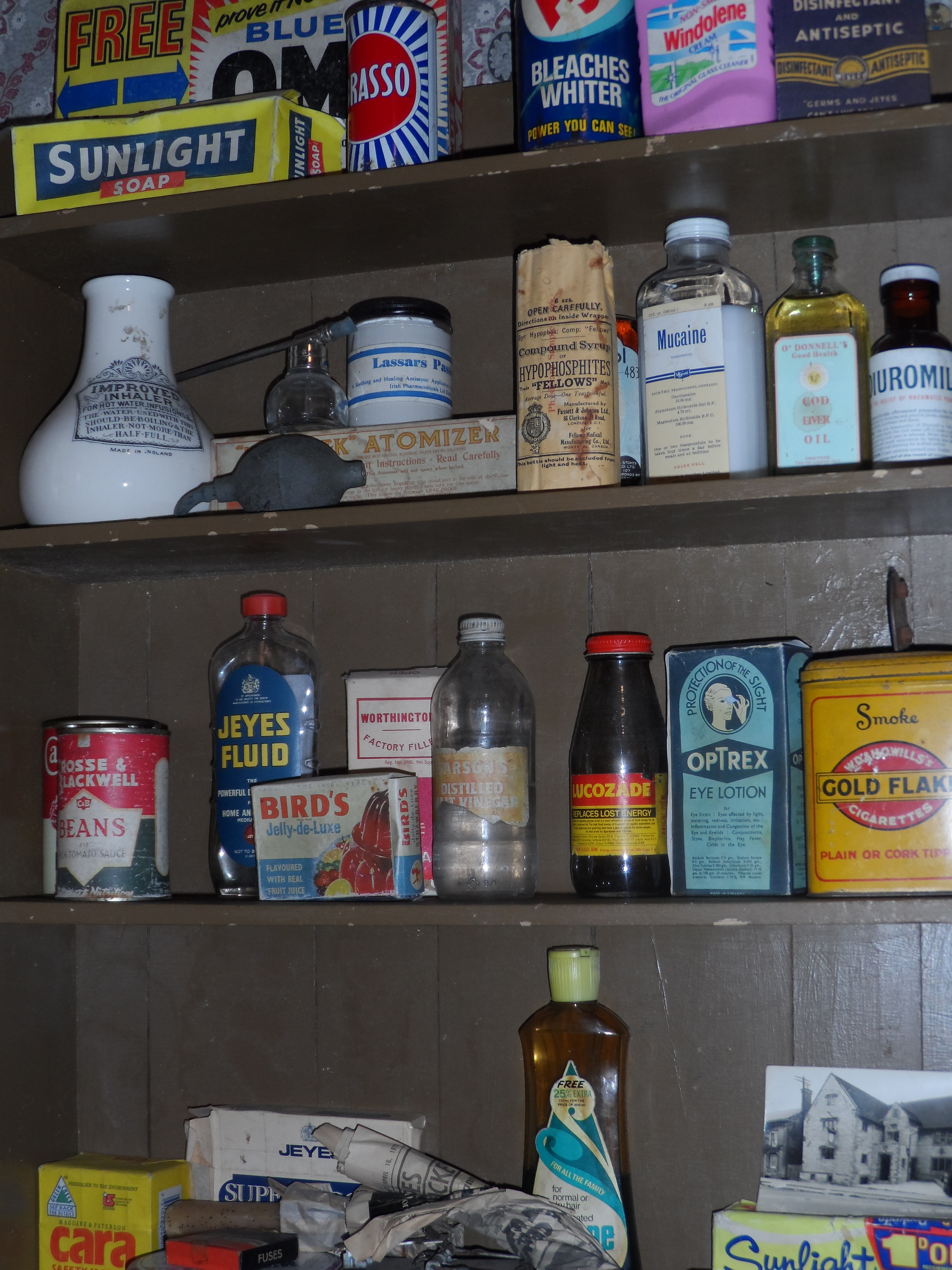
Shelf of household products

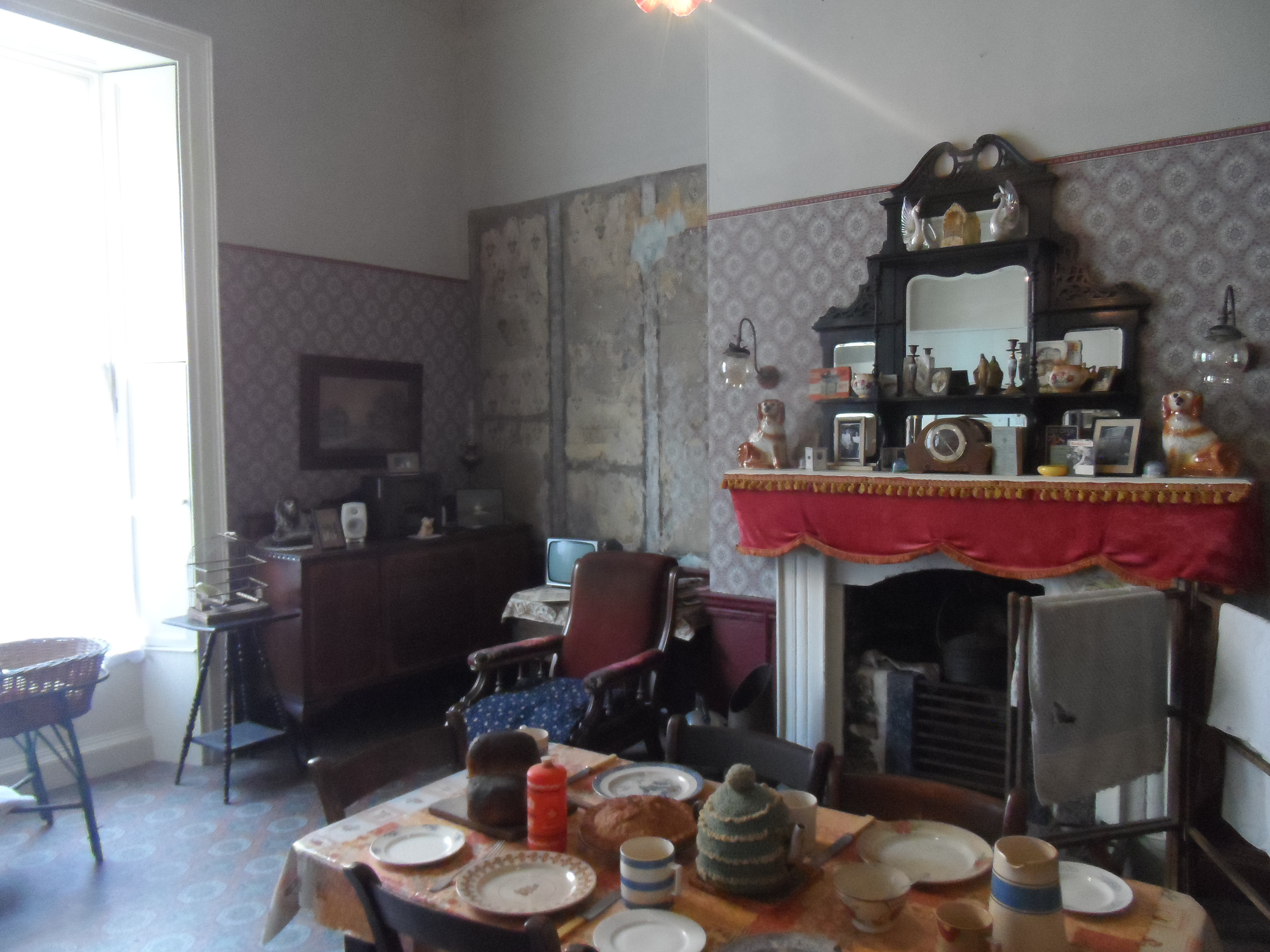
Replica of a tenement living room

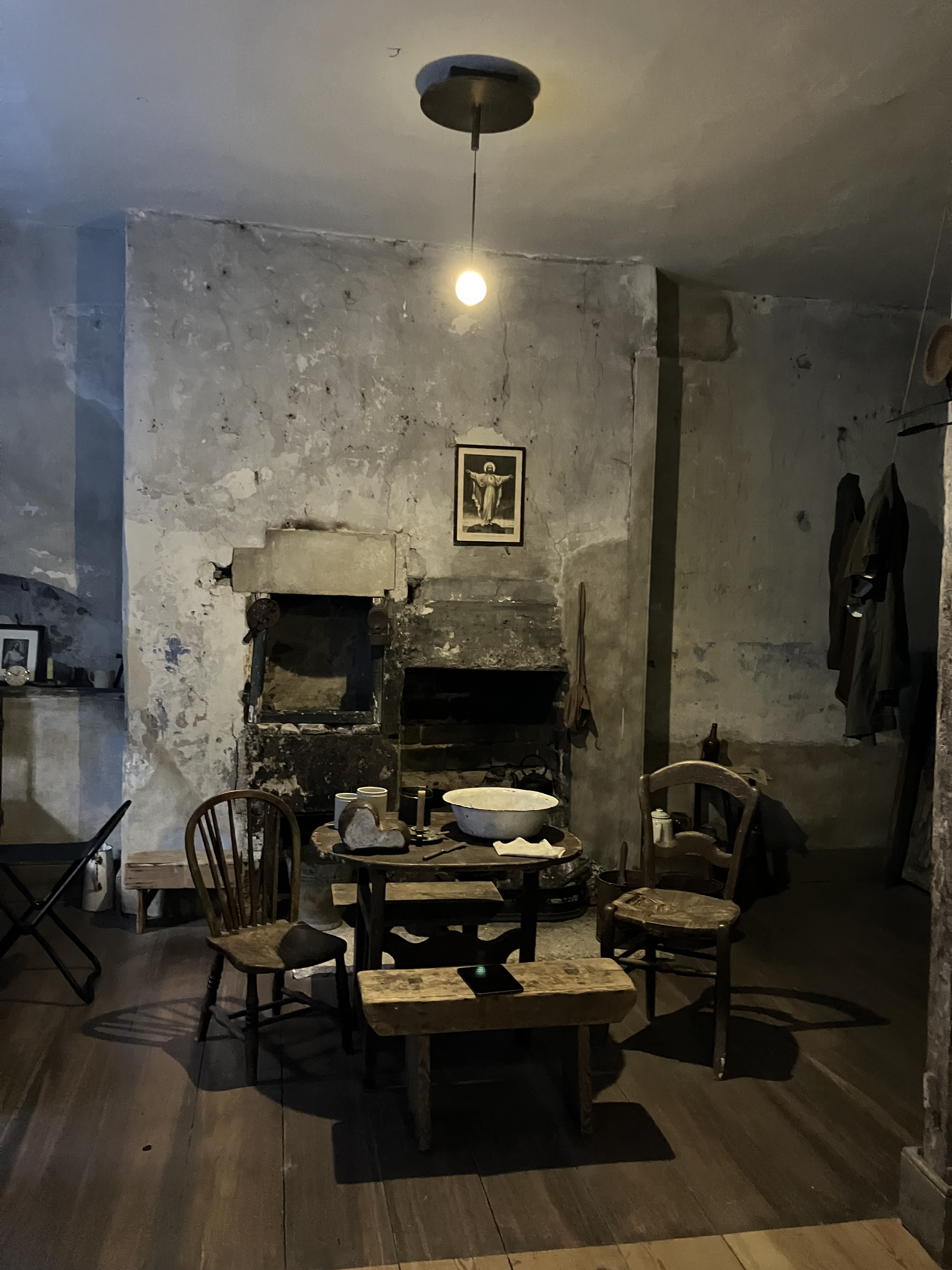
Basement
