= Queen Street, Dublin =

Street in central Dublin, Ireland

Queen Street
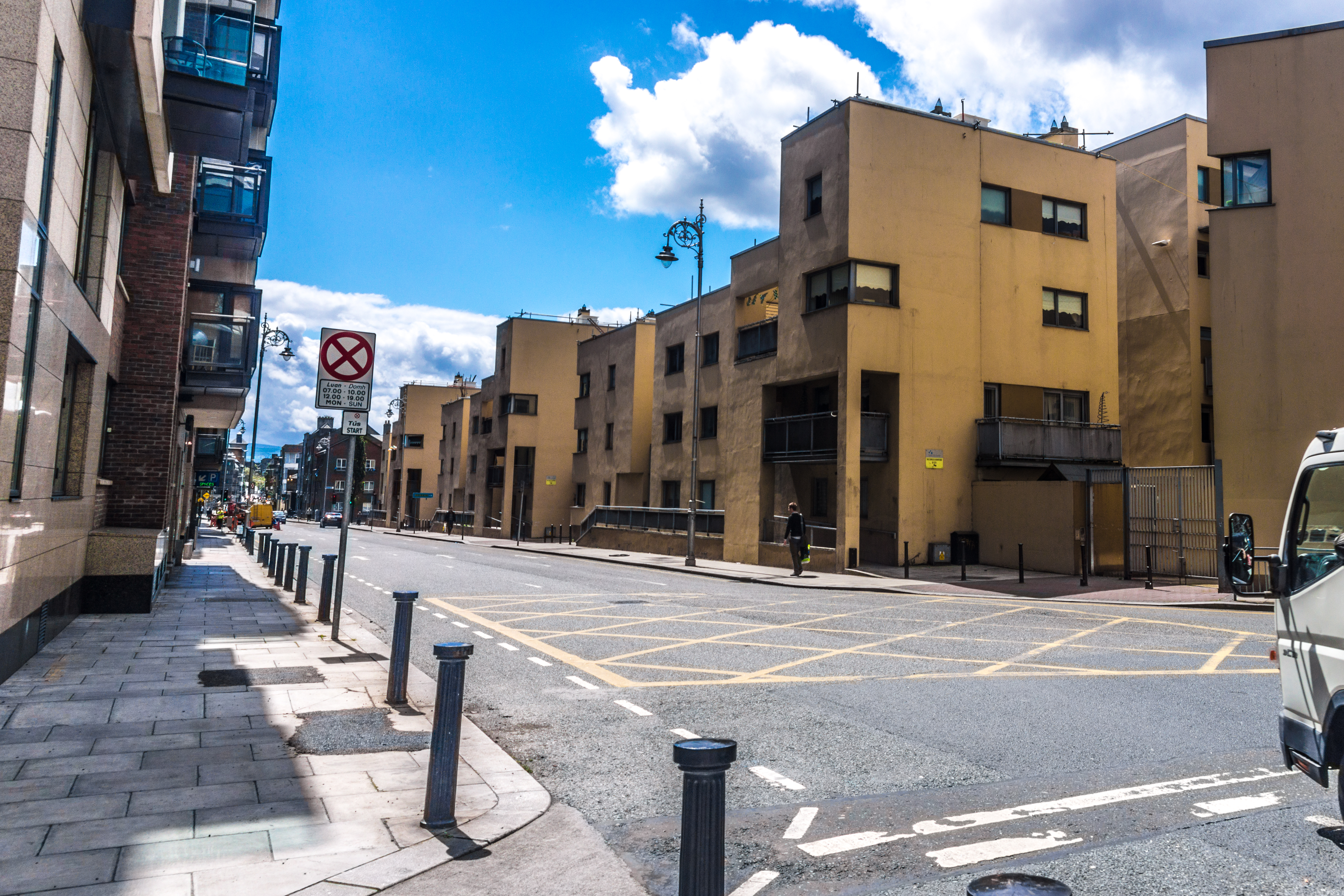
- northern end of Queen Street

- Location within Central Dublin
- Native name: Sráid na Banríona (Irish)
- Part of: Smithfield
- Namesake: Elizabeth I or Catherine of Braganza
- Type: Street
- Postal code: D07
- Coordinates: 53°20′53″N 6°16′48″W
- north end: North King Street
- south end: Arran Quay

Queen Street (Irish: Sráid na Banríona) is a street in Dublin running from North King Street to Arran Quay.

== Location ==
Queen Street runs from Arran Quay and Mellows Bridge at the south to North King Street to the north. It intersects with a number of historically significant streets, such as Hendrick Street and Benburb Street. Where it meets North King Street, it merges with George's Lane which was widened in 2002.

== History ==
The street dates from 1687, and is believed to have been named for Queen Elizabeth I (r. 1558–1603). Although it has been suggested that it may have been named for Catherine of Braganza (queen consort 1662–1685). It is historically part of the city known as Oxmantown, and lies close to the former common green area there. Its existence was mandated in 1664, as a highway from the common.

In 1671, the Blue Coat Boys Hospital (King's Hospital) was founded on Queen Street, on the eastern side. This was later redeveloped in lots for housing in 1782 and completed in 1800. These Georgian tenements were later replaced in the 20th century with public housing.

== Architecture ==
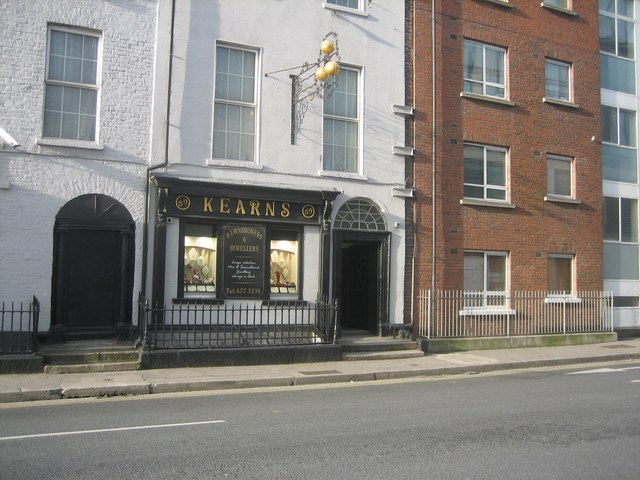
Kearns pawnbrokers

A small number of architecturally notable buildings remain on Queen Street, primarily at the junctions with other streets. One such building is 79 Queen Street, the former Dice Bar. Built as a commercial building, it has a date stone of 1770, but the current building dates from circa 1860 and is of typical Victorian styling. A survived pair of Georgian houses, numbers 69 and 70, are now interconnected and in use as a pawnbrokers. These date from circa 1790.

During the 1990s, schemes of flats were developed on Queen Street to infill houses which had been demolished for earlier road widening schemes. These were designed by Shay Cleary, and met with opposition from local politicians including Tony Gregory, who campaigned for houses to be built instead. The scheme went ahead, was completed in 2003, and also saw the development of existing corporation flats on the site. By the early 21st century, large parts of the more commercial end of the street near the quays were used as furniture showrooms.
