= Dublin Civic Exhibition (1914) =

International event in Dublin, Ireland

- Date: July 15 – August 31, 1914
- Venue: Linenhall and Temple Gardens with entrance via Henrietta Street
- Location: 53.3519178°N 6.2712908°W
- Patron: John Hamilton-Gordon, 1st Marquess of Aberdeen and Temair (Lord Lieutenant of Ireland)
- Organised by: Civics Institute of Ireland and Patrick Geddes

The Dublin Civic Exhibition (1914) was a one-off international exhibition which was presented from 15 July to 31 August 1914 in Dublin, Ireland. The event commenced just prior to the start of World War I and finished after the war had officially commenced on the 28th of July 1914. The event was intended to inspire confidence and pose Dublin as a "phoenix rising" city while also promoting mainly social causes such as better housing and child welfare.

Much of the event's impact was eclipsed and forgotten about because of the outbreak of the war as well as the Howth gun-running and other notable events which occurred at the same time, including the earlier Dublin lock-out.

== History ==
The idea for the event developed from Patrick Geddes’s Cities and Town Planning Exhibition which featured in the Uí Breasail Health and Industrial Exhibition, organised by the Women's National Health Association, at the Royal Dublin Society in 1911. This event, at the RDS, was largely brought about by the wife of the Lord Lieutenant of Ireland, Vicerene Lady Aberdeen who had also founded the Women's National Health Association a few years earlier. Her husband, John Hamilton-Gordon, 1st Marquess of Aberdeen and Temair (Lord Lieutenant of Ireland) formally opened the event, with most of the cities other main dignitaries attending.

The event was formally organised by the Civics Institute of Ireland, which had been established in March 1914. It was focused on town planning, housing, public health, child welfare and urban renewal but attempted to engage the public by making it more of a civic festival which included fireworks, a ballroom, playground, outdoor exhibits, and rooms for refreshments, concerts and dances, lectures and competitions in musical performance and food and agricultural demonstrations.

One of the overall aims of the event was to reimagine Dublin as a "phoenix of cities" during a time of economic, political and social unrest. The event was described by the Irish Times prior to its opening as "one of the most important enterprises in modern Irish history" and 9,000 people attended the first day of the exhibition. Attendances were dented by the outbreak of the war and ultimately only 110,000 people attended by the end of August 1914.

=== Location ===
The event took place at the Linenhall Buildings and what was then Temple Gardens and is now the public park at the front of the King's Inns. Entrance for the public was mainly via Henrietta Street. It featured dedicated buildings which were constructed for the event including a main exhibition hall that was constructed in what was the grounds of the King's Inns.

The Linenhall complex was almost entirely destroyed less than two years later, during the Easter Rising of 1916, as it was in use as a barracks.

== See also ==
- Great Industrial Exhibition, Dublin (1853)
- International Exhibition of Arts and Manufactures, Dublin (1865)
- Irish International Exhibition (1907)
- Dublin Civic Trust
- The Georgian Society
