= North King Street =

Street in Dublin, Ireland

- King Street North
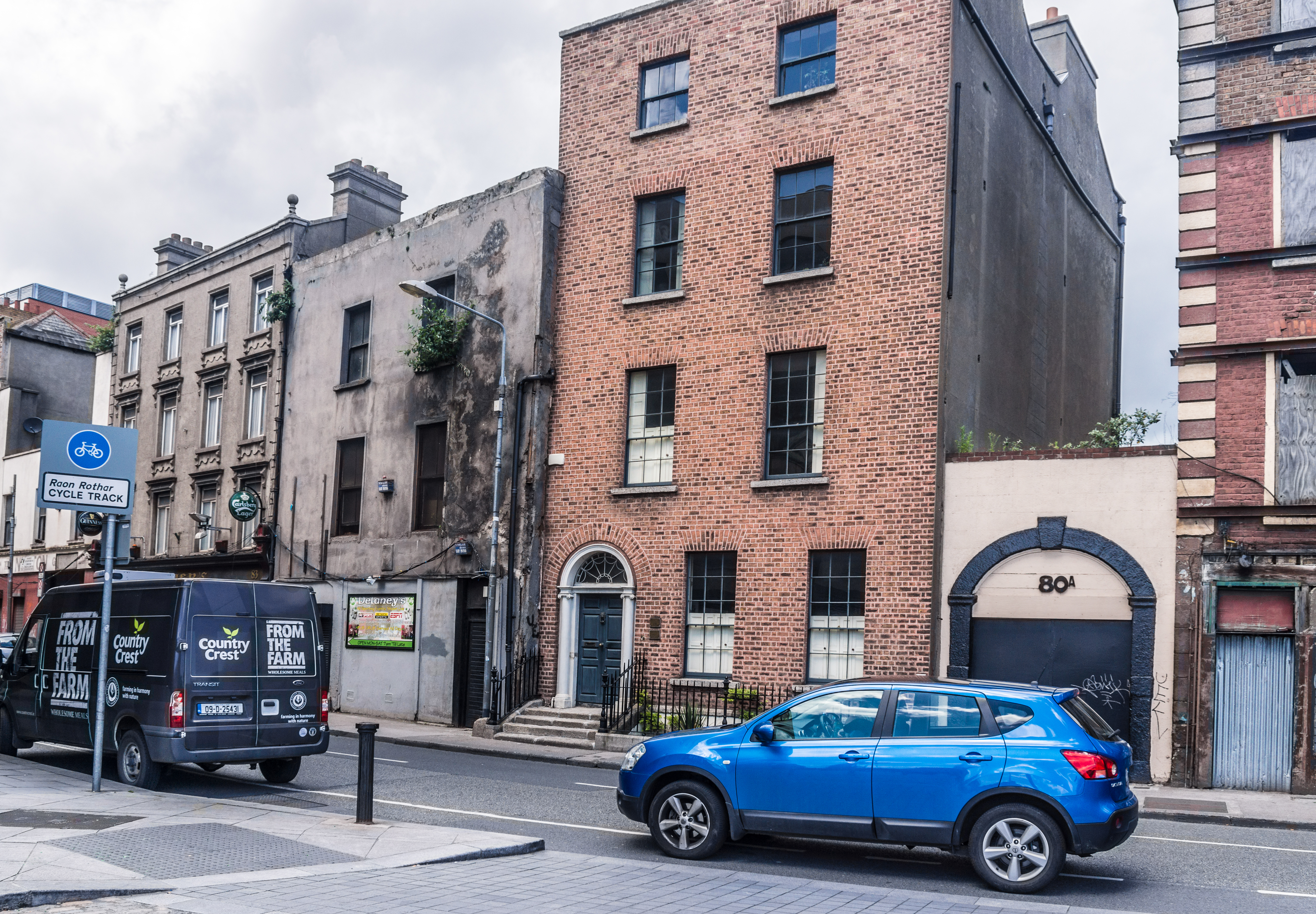
- North King Street in 2012
- Interactive map of North King Street
- Native name: Sráid an Rí Thuaidh (Irish)
- Location: Dublin, Ireland
- Postal code: D07
- Coordinates: 53°21′00″N 6°16′16″W
- north end: Bolton Street
- Major junctions: Church Street
- west end: Blackhall Place

North King Street or King Street North (Irish: Sráid an Rí Thuaidh) is a street in Dublin which connects Bolton Street to the north and Blackhall Place to the west.

== History ==
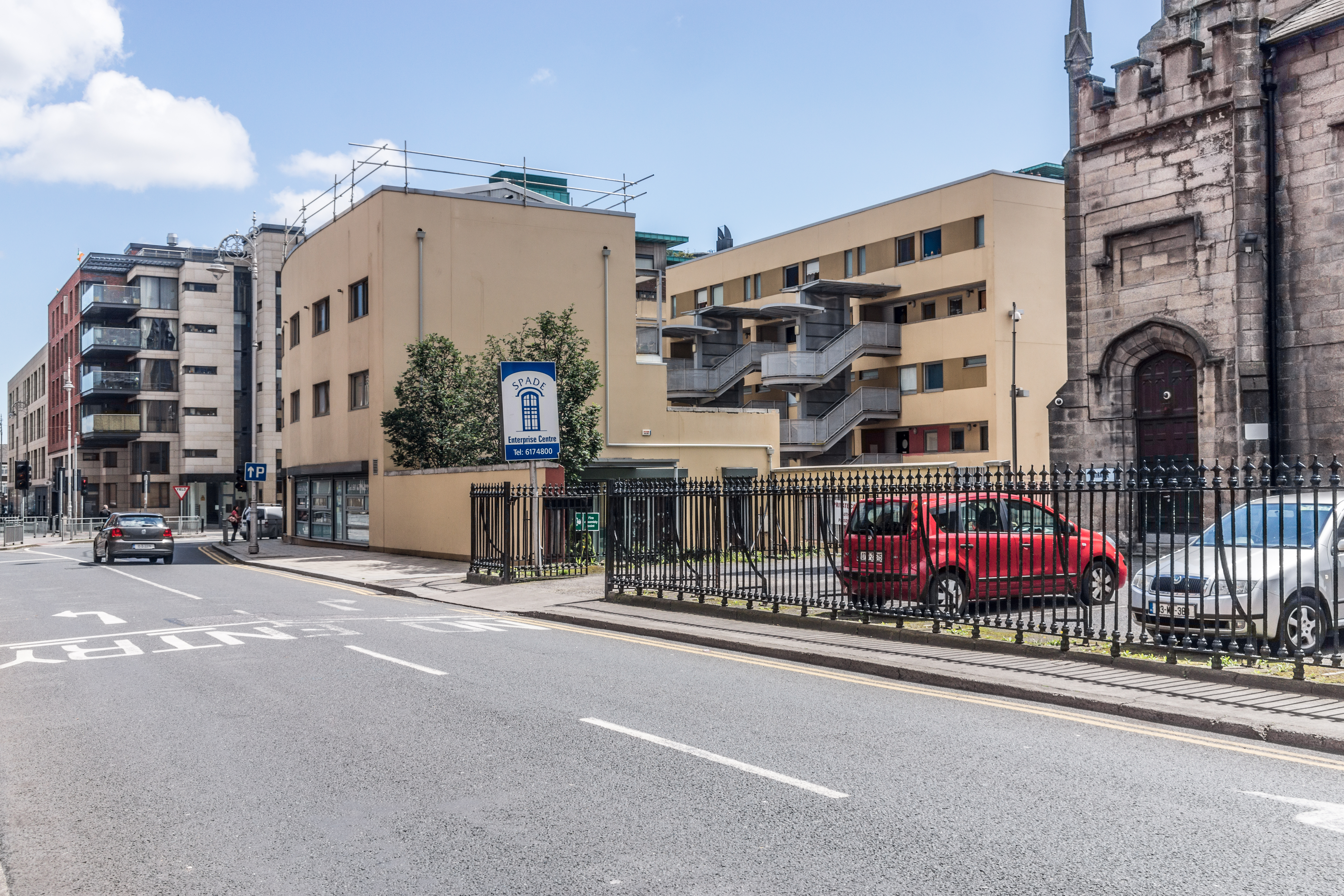
Regenerated area of North King Street

The street has been documented from the 16th century, and was likely named due to its proximity to Queen Street. In 1551 it is called "King Street, Oxmanstown", and is likely the "King's Lane, Oxmanstown" mentioned in 1438.

The street was quite fashionable in the 17th century, with houses and a school run by the Poor Clare nuns for the children of wealthy families. George Berkeley was consecrated Bishop of Cloyne in St Paul's Church of Ireland on the street in 1734.

The older architecture of the street shows the development of Dublin during the late medieval period, with later additions from the 1700s and 1800s on. North King Street is in the wider Smithfield area, which was redeveloped from 2000 onwards.

=== The North King Street Massacre 1916 ===
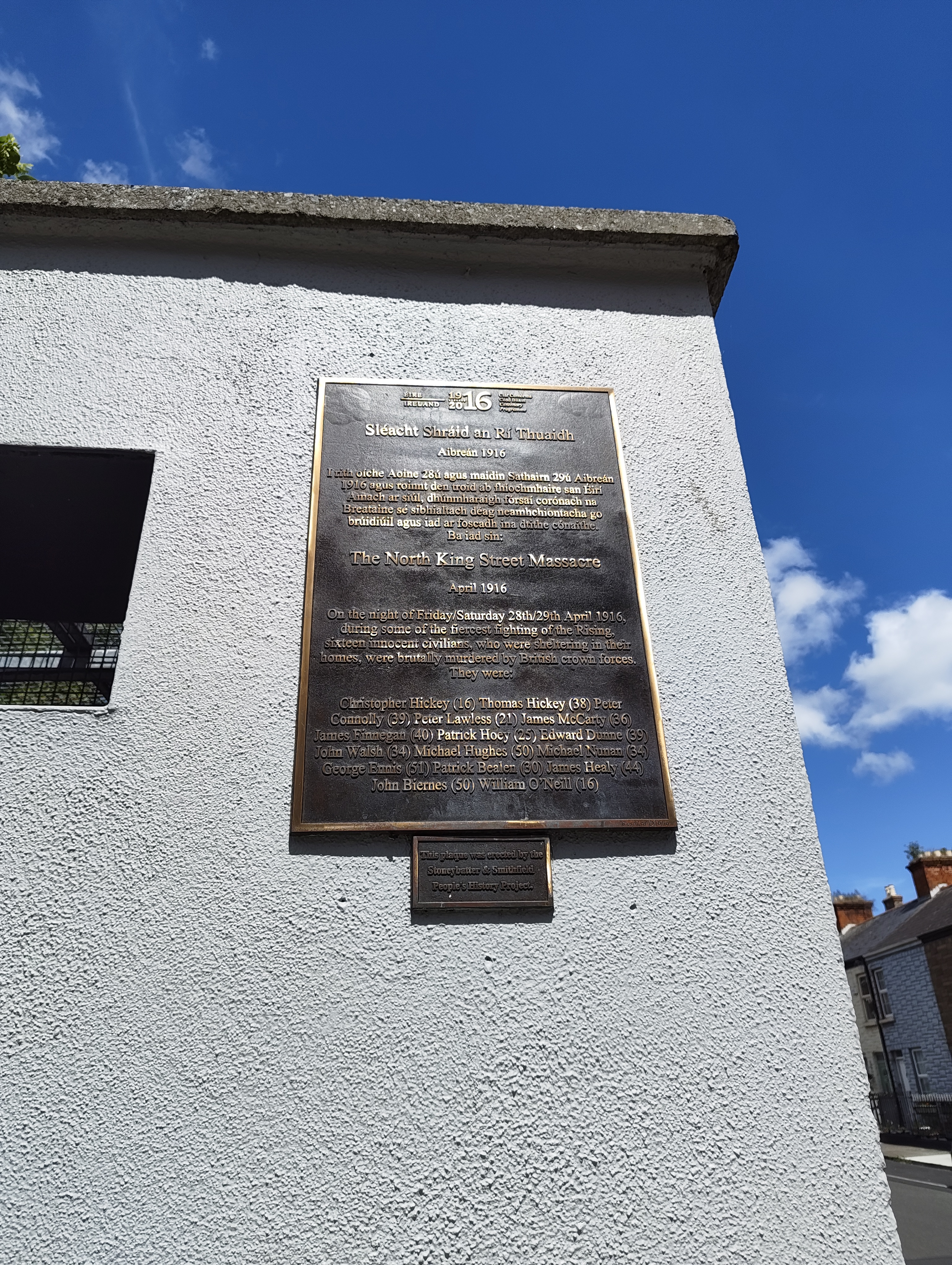
North King Street Massacre plaque

At the commencement of the Easter Rising in 1916, the Irish Volunteers erected barricades on North King Street. Many houses and buildings were damaged during the British advance against the Volunteers, with some retreating Volunteers boring through the walls in terraced buildings in an effort of escape. It was one of the most contested areas during the Rising, and one of the worst acts of violence against Dublin citizens by British forces recorded. Following loses during the fighting early during the Rising, the South Staffordshire Regiment under a colonel Taylor shot or bayoneted 15 civilian men they accused of being Irish Volunteers as they moved from building to building advancing up the street from Bolton Street.

== Notable residents ==
- Seán McLoughlin, nationalist and communist activist, born in the street in 1895.

== Notable businesses ==
- The Cobblestone
