= Charles Carr (bishop of Killaloe) =

Irish Anglican clergyman

Charles Carr (1672–1739) was an Irish Anglican clergyman: he was Bishop of Killaloe from 1716 to 1739.

He was born in Donore, County Kildare and educated at Trinity College, Dublin. The Chaplain of The King's Hospital, he became Vicar of Kilkea in 1701. Served in St. Paul's Church Smithfield, Dublin as curate (1705–08) and Rector (1708-1716). He was also Chaplain of the Irish House of Commons. He was consecrated Bishop of Killaloe in June 1716. He died in Dublin on 26 December 1739 and was buried at St Patrick's Cathedral in that city.

Church of Ireland titles
Preceded by Nicholas Foster	Bishop of Killaloe; 1716–1739	Succeeded by Joseph Story
