= Ispíní na hÉireann =

Irish neo-traditional punk rock group

Ispíní na hÉireannn
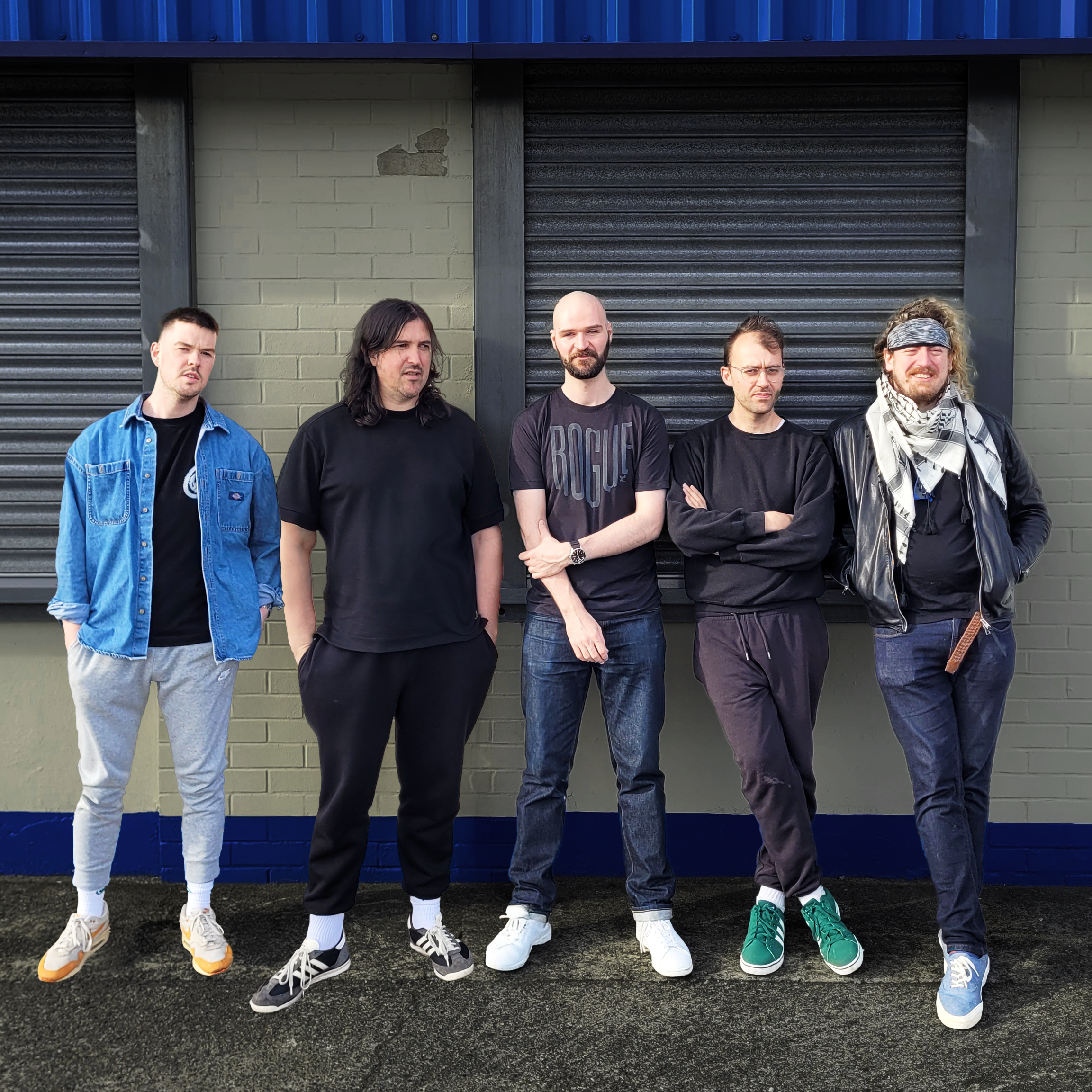
- Ispíní na hÉireann lads

Background information
- Origin: Dublin, Ireland
- Genres: Irish folk; folk punk
- Works: The Hard Working Men (2022); Worse Things Than Dying (2023); Poxtail Soup (2025)
- Years active: 2018–present
- Members: Tomás Mulligan; Paahto Cummins; Aongus Mac Amhlaigh; Pádraig “Óg” Mac Aodhagáin; Declan Gillen
- Website: sausagesofireland.com

Ispíní na hÉireann is an Irish trad rock collective based in Dublin. Formed by guitarist Tomás Mulligan and banjo player Adam J. Holohan, they emerged from a neo-traditional scene centred in Dublin's famous Cobblestone pub. They have played multiple festivals, shows and released two records, The Hard Working Men in 2022 and Worse Things Than Dying (2023), which were critically well received. Their upcoming album, Poxtail Soup is set for release November 21st, 2025.

The band features a rotating lineup of exceptional musicians, including regulars vocalist, cellist, and fiddle player Aongus MacAmhlaigh, multi-instrumentalist Pádraig Óg Mac Aodhagáin (saxophone, flute, Uilleann pipes), vocalist and banjo player Paahto Cummins, and bodhrán player, percussionist, and dancer Declan Gillen, among others.

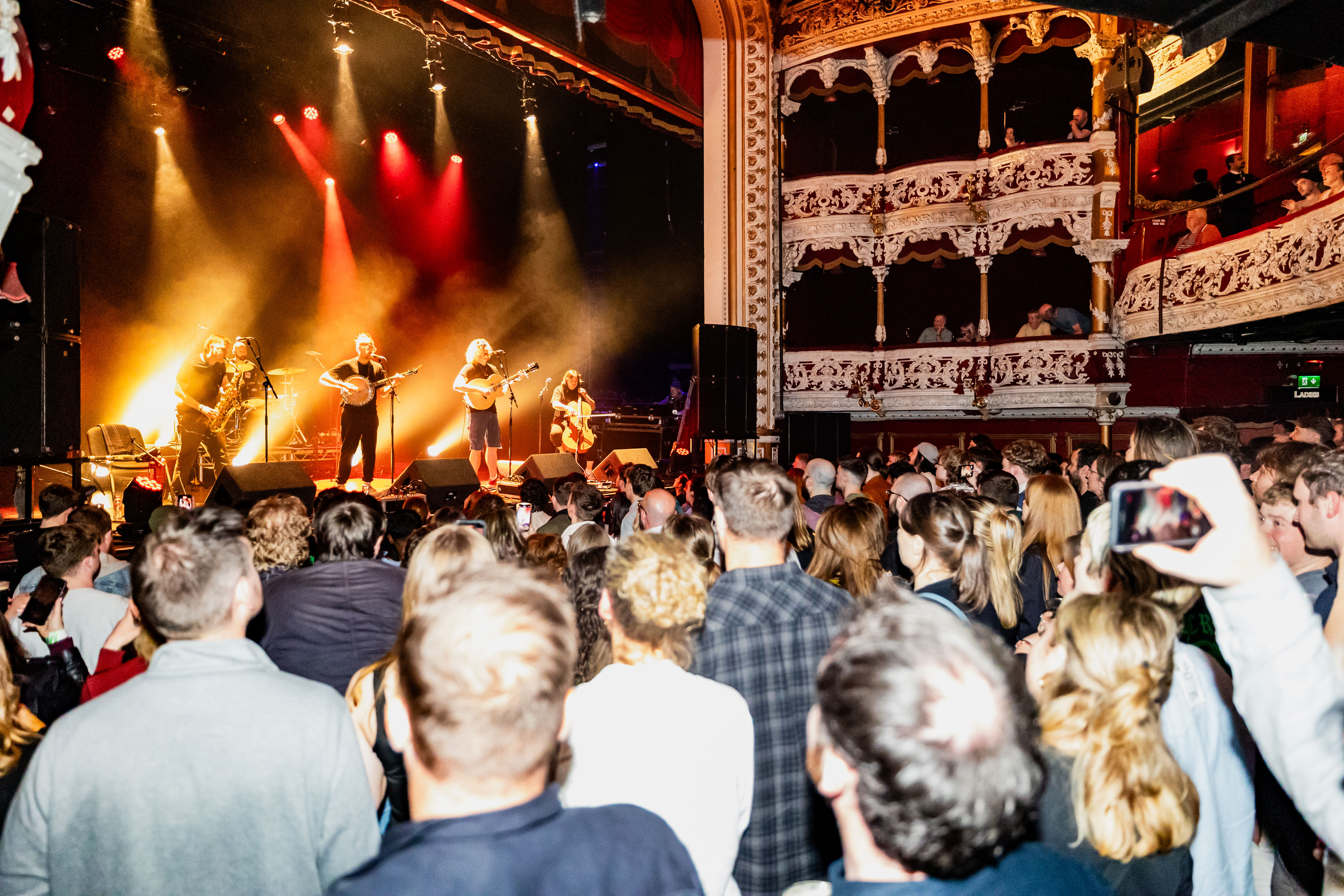
Ispíní na hÉireann Live Headline Performance at Olympia Theater Dublin May 01, 2025

== History ==
The band emerged from a neo-traditional movement centred on The Cobblestone pub in Dublin. Guitarist Tomás Mulligan and original banjo player Adam J. Holohan decided to form the band after touring in Slovakia in 2017, and they were joined by Aongus Mac Amhlaigh (cello), Pádraig Óg Mac Aodhagháin (uilleann pipes) and Kinko Ceallaigh (bodhrán) the following January.

The band's name in Irish means "Sausages of Ireland" in English, chosen by Mulligan and Holohan "because we are the slippiest, greasiest dogs going". The band announced in April 2025 that founding member Holohan had departed, that percussionist Declan Gillen and banjo player Paahto Cummins had joined, and that their forthcoming album Poxtail Soup would be released later that summer.

They have played at festivals including All Together Now, Electric Picnic, and Otherside Festival as well as headlining shows at famed Dublin venues such as the Academy and the Olympia Theater.

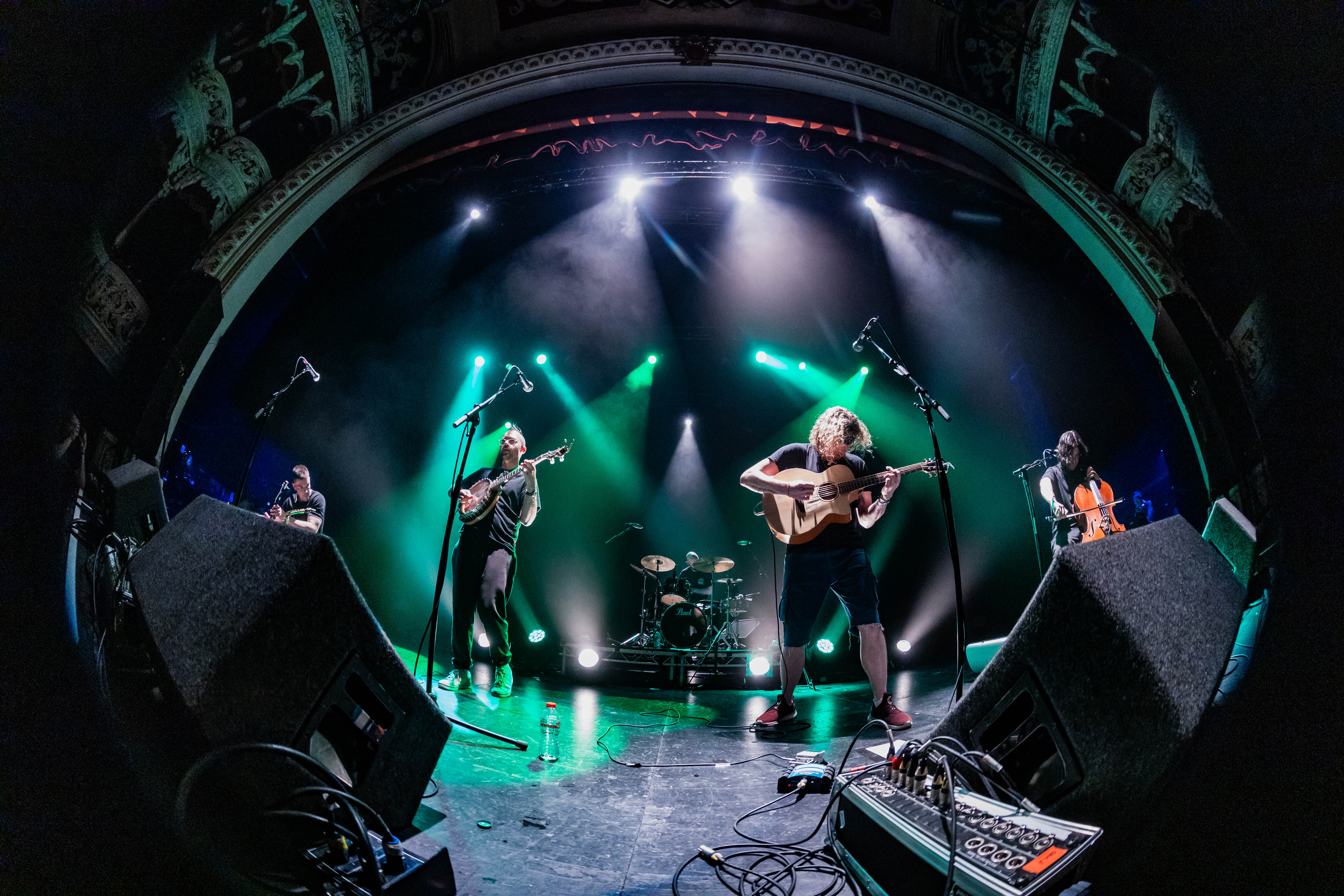
Ispíní na hÉireann Live Headline Gig at 3 Olympia Dublin May 1 2025

== Reception ==
Hot Press magazine characterised the band's relationship with the Irish folk tradition as "satirical", and their performances as "raucous", "memorable", and of "infectious energy".

Comparing them to contemporary acts Lankum and Ye Vagabonds, the Headstuff podcast site described the band as "a less subtle approach that blends heritage and tradition with light-hearted, irreverent comedy", and said their comedic approach set them apart from similar acts, though their "musical skill forms a solid skeleton to support the comedy flesh".

Writing in The Irish Times newspaper, Una Mullally described their debut album The Hard Working Men (2022) as "a rambunctious approach that can lean towards laughs before pulling back to demonstrate their musical talents".

Their follow-up EP Worse than Dying was a change of emphasis, described by Riley Glaister-Ryder of Hot Press as "taking Irish tradition to soaring heights".

== Discography ==
- The Hard Working Men (2022)
- Worse Things Than Dying (2023)
- Poxtail Soup (2025)

== See also ==
- The Mary Wallopers, a contemporary Irish trad/punk act
- Madra Salach, a neo-folk, contemporary folk act
