= St. Paul's Church (Church of Ireland) =

Church in Dublin, Ireland, 1824 to 1987

Coordinates: 53°20′59″N 6°16′50″W

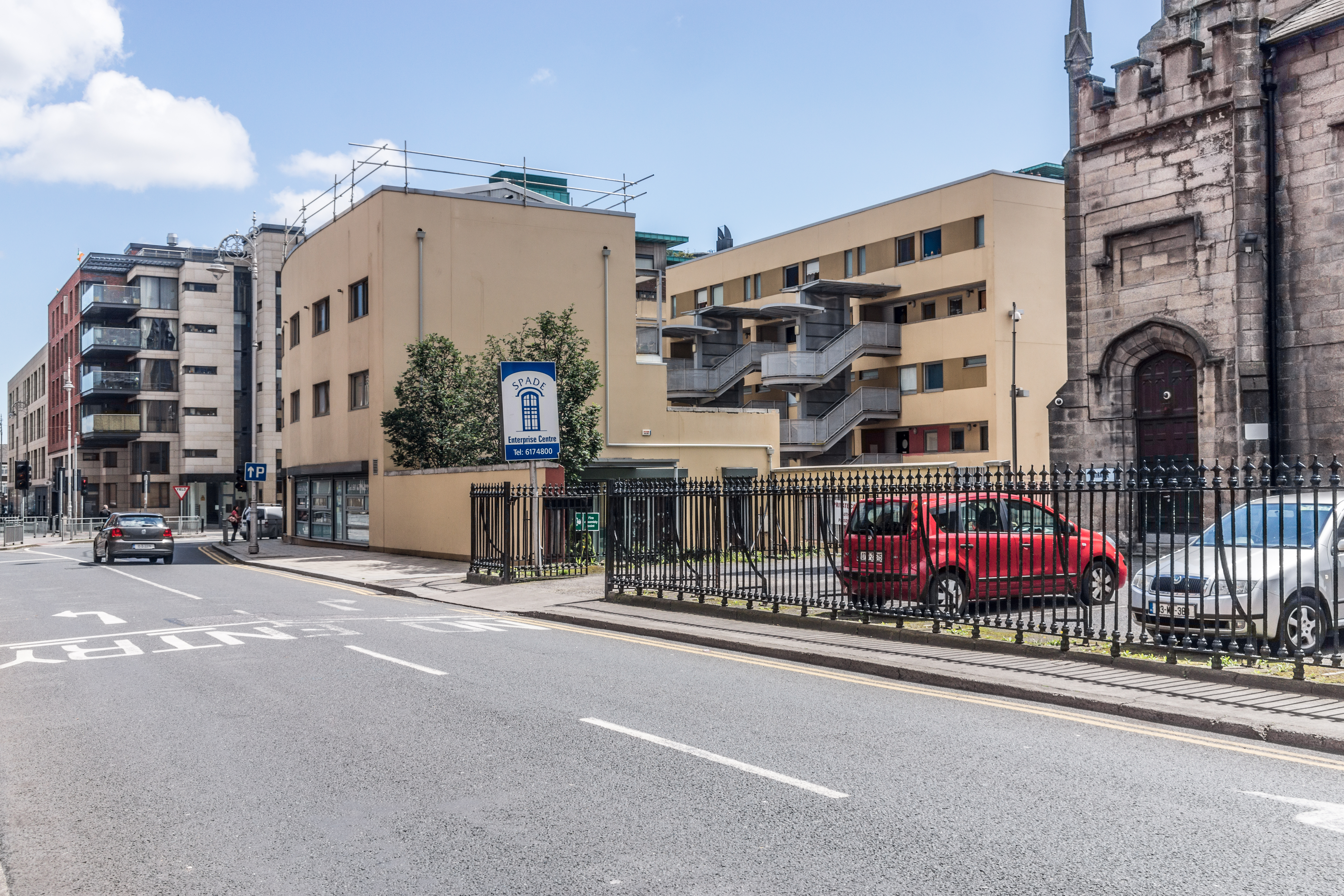
North King Street with the Spade Centre to the right

St. Paul's Church is a former Church of Ireland on North King Street, Smithfield, Dublin, presently the home of the Spade Enterprise Centre.

== History ==
The first church was opened on the site was constructed in 1702.

The present building was completed and opened in 1824, in the Gothic style, according to the plans of William Farrell.

The parish was formerly part of St. Michan's, which was reduced to the area immediately around it, and two new parishes were established from St. Michans, St. Mary's and St. Paul's - land in North King Street on which St. Paul's was established was set aside in 1697. The older St. Paul's church held its last service on Easter Sunday, 1821. 1830 seen some of the northern part of the parish moved to the newly established All Saints Church, Grangegorman parish.

A chancel and porches were added by Albert E. Murray in 1880, reversing its orientation.

=== Closure ===
In 1987 the doors of the Church were finally closed for good and it was de-consecrated, and worship was transferred back to St. Michan's.

== People associated with St. Paul's ==
Rectors of the church include the Rev. Dr. Charles Carr (1708–1716) a subsequent Bishop of Killaloe, Rev. Dr. Oliver Brady, Rev. Dr. Boyle Travers, Rev. Dr. Dixie Blundell, Rev. Thomas Radcliffe and to Rev W. J. Le Fanu. The older church was reputed to be the burial place of Robert Emmet, and where the philosopher George Berkeley was consecrated as Bishop of Cloyne in 1734.

Viscount Charlemont was one of the original churchwardens.

== Cemetery ==
The attached cemetery was the primary place of interment for the nearby garrison of Dublin and contained a monument to the memory of Lt. Col. Lyde Browne (shot dead by the United Irishmen in 1803), of the 21st Royal Fusiliers and a mural tablet to three privates of the same regiment, who all were killed in the insurrection of 1803; as well as a mausoleum for the family of Colonel Ormsby. The graveyard closed in the 1860s.

Most of the graveyard is under tarmac and the remainder, an unused fenced-off area to the south, is under gravel. A further section has been alienated to the south again, where a former school building now houses a community centre.

== Records ==
Church of Ireland records from 1702 to 1892 at the Representative Church Body; burial records are at the Genealogical Office, Manuscript No. 577. The proceedings of the church are recorded in minute books which survive intact back to the year 1698.
