= Smithfield, Dublin =

Northern inner city area of Dublin, Ireland

Smithfield Margadh na Feirme (Irish)
- Neighbourhood of Dublin
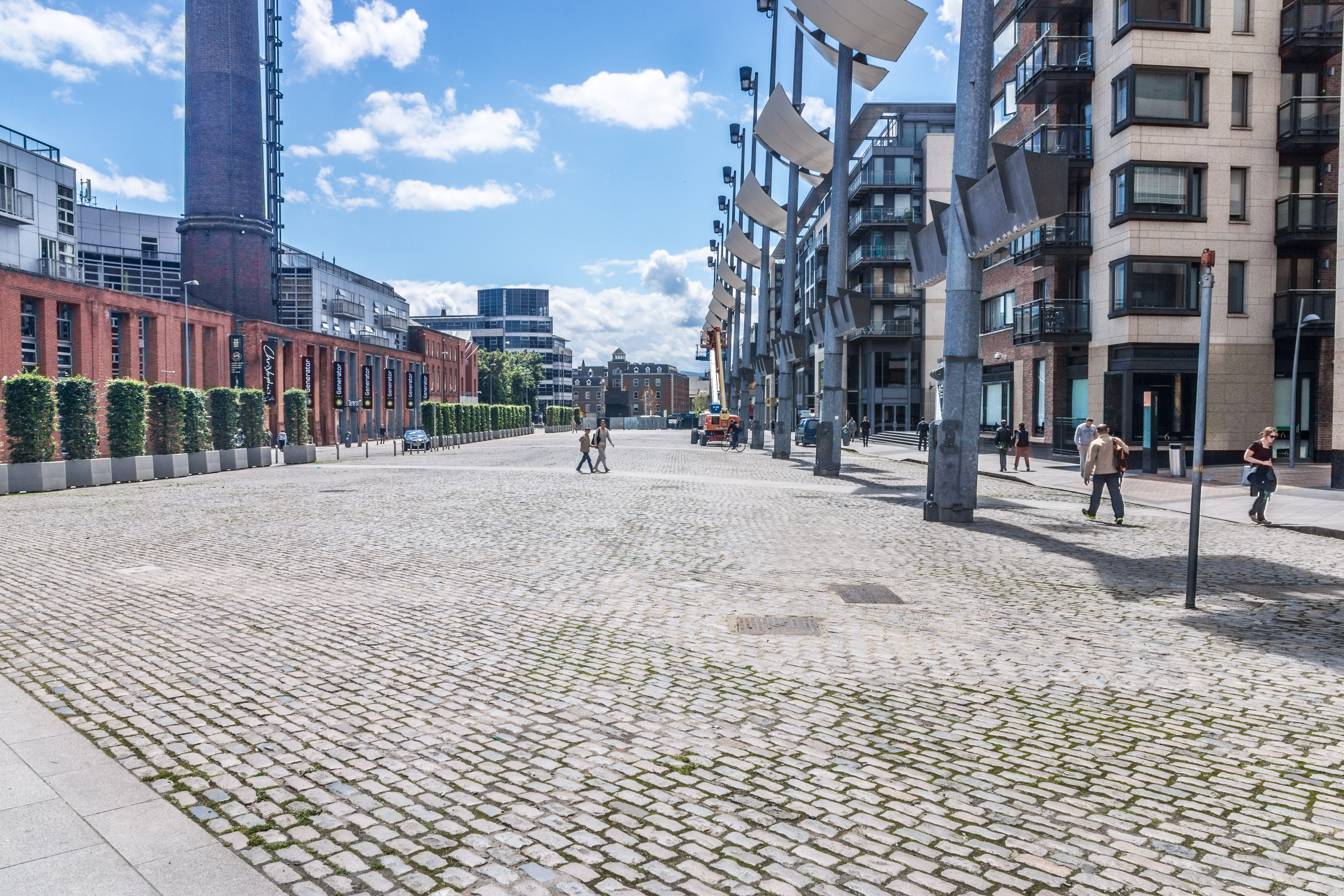
- Smithfield Plaza

- Location in Dublin Smithfield (Dublin)
- Country: Ireland
- County: Dublin
- City: Dublin
- Eircode routing key: D07

Smithfield (Irish: Margadh na Feirme, meaning 'Farm Market') is an area on the Northside of Dublin, Ireland. Its focal point is a public square, formerly an open market and common, now officially called Smithfield Plaza, but known locally as Smithfield Square or Smithfield Market. Historically, Smithfield formed the western part of Oxmantown and lay close to Oxmantown Green.

Originally, Smithfield lay within the civil parish of St. Paul's, and was served by the Church of Ireland St. Paul's Church, on North King Street, now the SPADE Business Centre, and the Catholic St. Paul's Church, on Arran Quay, now used by the Catholic Youth Council, and Mission Ministry.

The area known as Smithfield roughly incorporates the area bounded by the River Liffey to the south, Bow Street to the east, Queen Street to the west, and North Brunswick Street in the suburb of Grangegorman to the north.

Notable landmarks include the Old Jameson Whiskey Distillery and the Observation Tower as well as the hub of Irish traditional music, the Cobblestone Pub.

== History ==
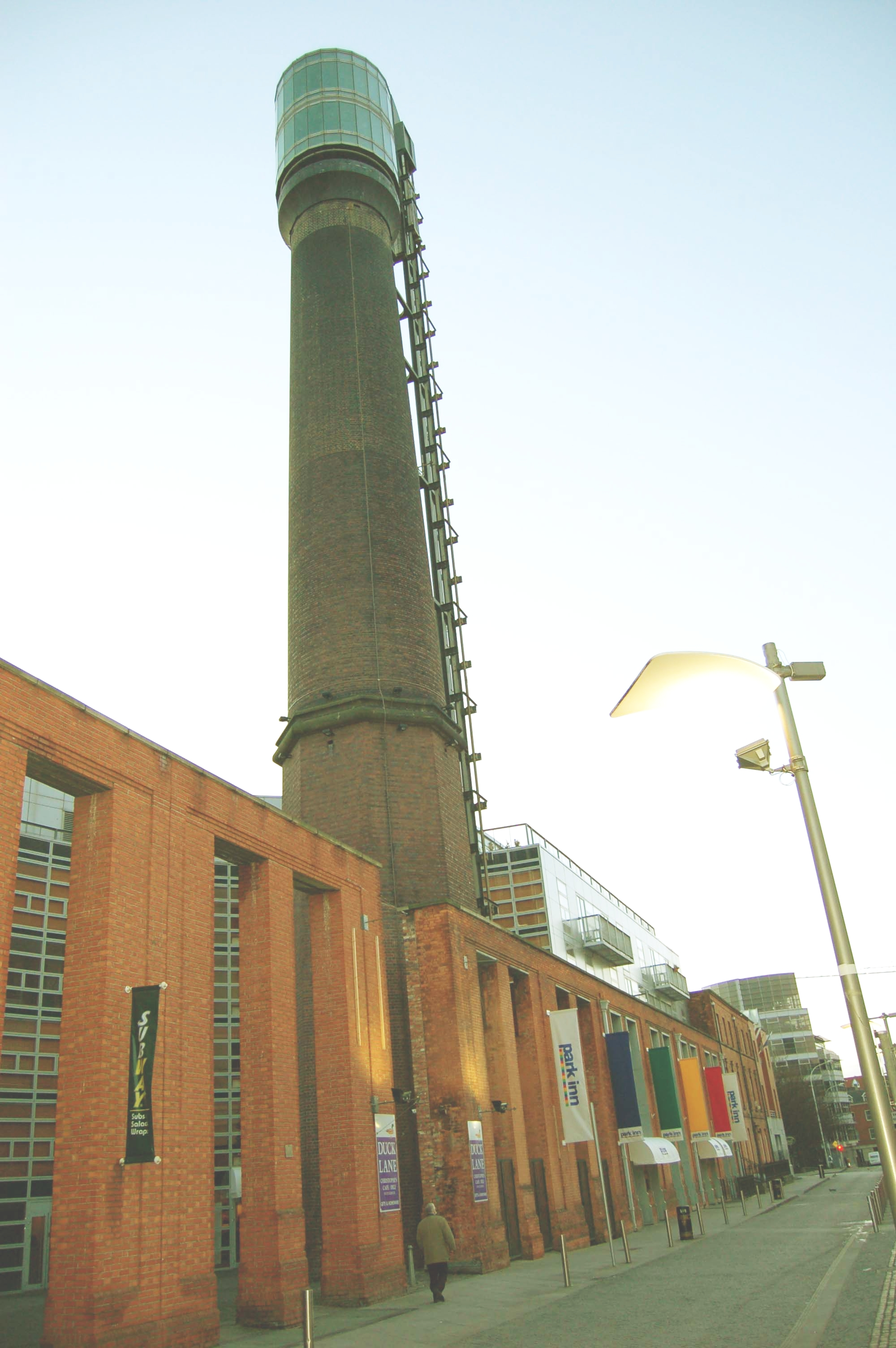
Chimney with observation decks in Smithfield

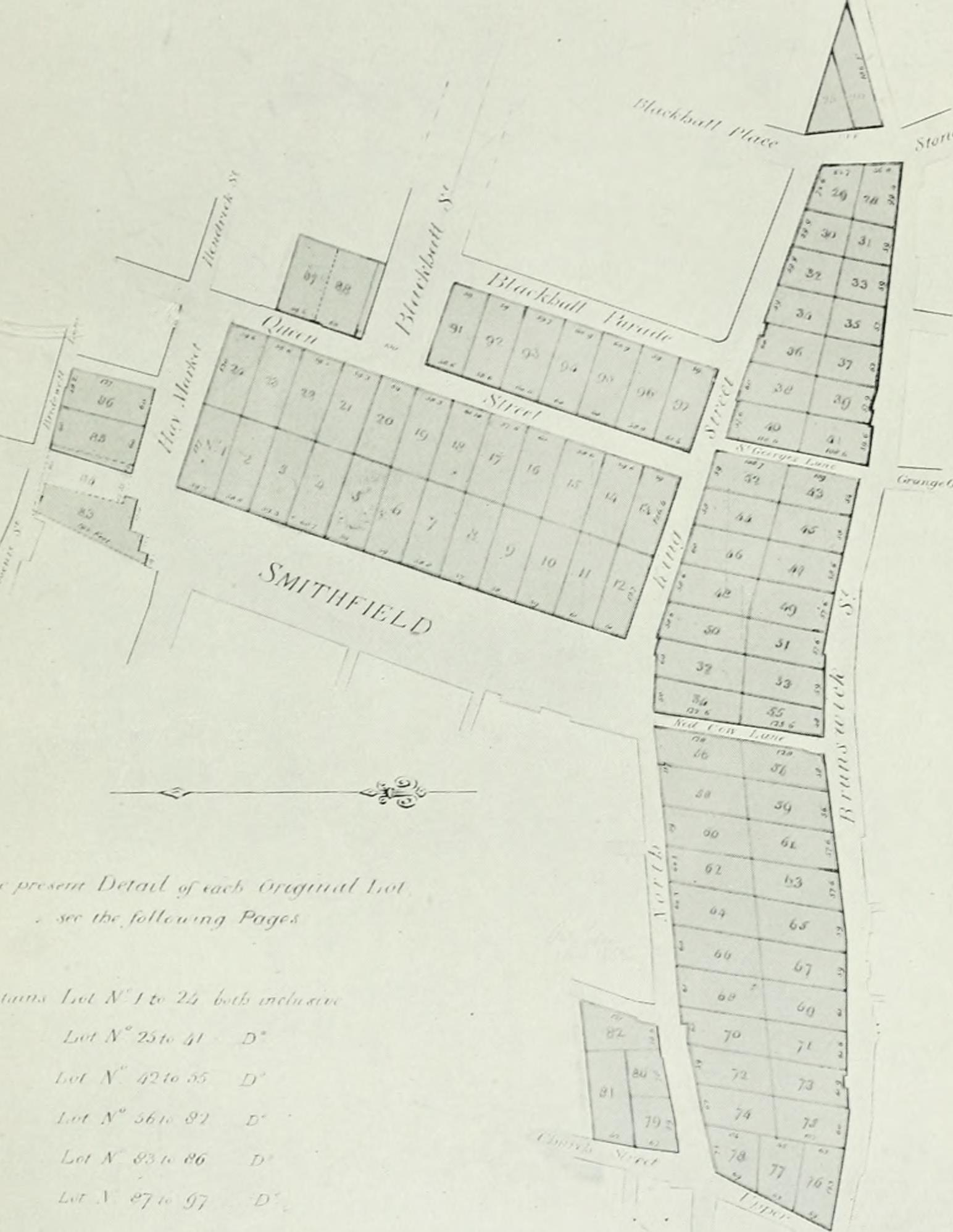
Plan of the original lots of Oxmanstown Green from 1665.

Smithfield Market was laid out in its current form in the mid-17th century as a marketplace close to the site of the former Oxmantown Green. It remained mainly a market and commercial area with one of the few aristocratic houses in the area being for the Thomas Taylour, 1st Earl of Bective and constructed in 1738 however he ultimately moved on to a more fashionable at 17 Rutland Square later in the century.

Until its renovation in the early 21st Century, the square was lined with inner city 'farm yards' housing livestock. In 1964 Richard Burton and Elizabeth Taylor spent time here, as Burton worked on the film set in Smithfield for the film adaptation of John le Carré's novel The Spy Who Came in from the Cold. Smithfield featured as Checkpoint Charlie in the movie.

Smithfield was rejuvenated under the HARP (Historic Area Rejuvenation Plan). An architectural competition was held and won by McGarry NiEanaigh Architects in 1997. The restoration involved lifting more than 400,000 one-hundred-and-twenty-year-old cobblestones, cleaning them by hand and re-laying them.

Contemporary architecture and twelve 26.5 metre gas lighting masts, each with a 2-metre flame, now flank the square. Although the flames are rarely lit, the lighting mast shades can at times be seen in different colours, reflecting cultural events throughout the year. For example, they change to a vivid green shade as part of St Patrick's Day celebrations and were changed to rainbow colours for the opening night of the 2015 GAZE International LGBT Film Festival at Smithfield's Light House Cinema.

Smithfield has held many horse fields for hundreds of years and the tradition still continues today. Horse fairs take place every first Sunday of each month. The smell of horses can still be experienced at Smithfield at the Horse Market. And the sight and sounds on these Sundays give an impression of what Smithfield was once like, with a number of surrounding alleys and laneways bearing obscure names relating to the equine heritage of the site.

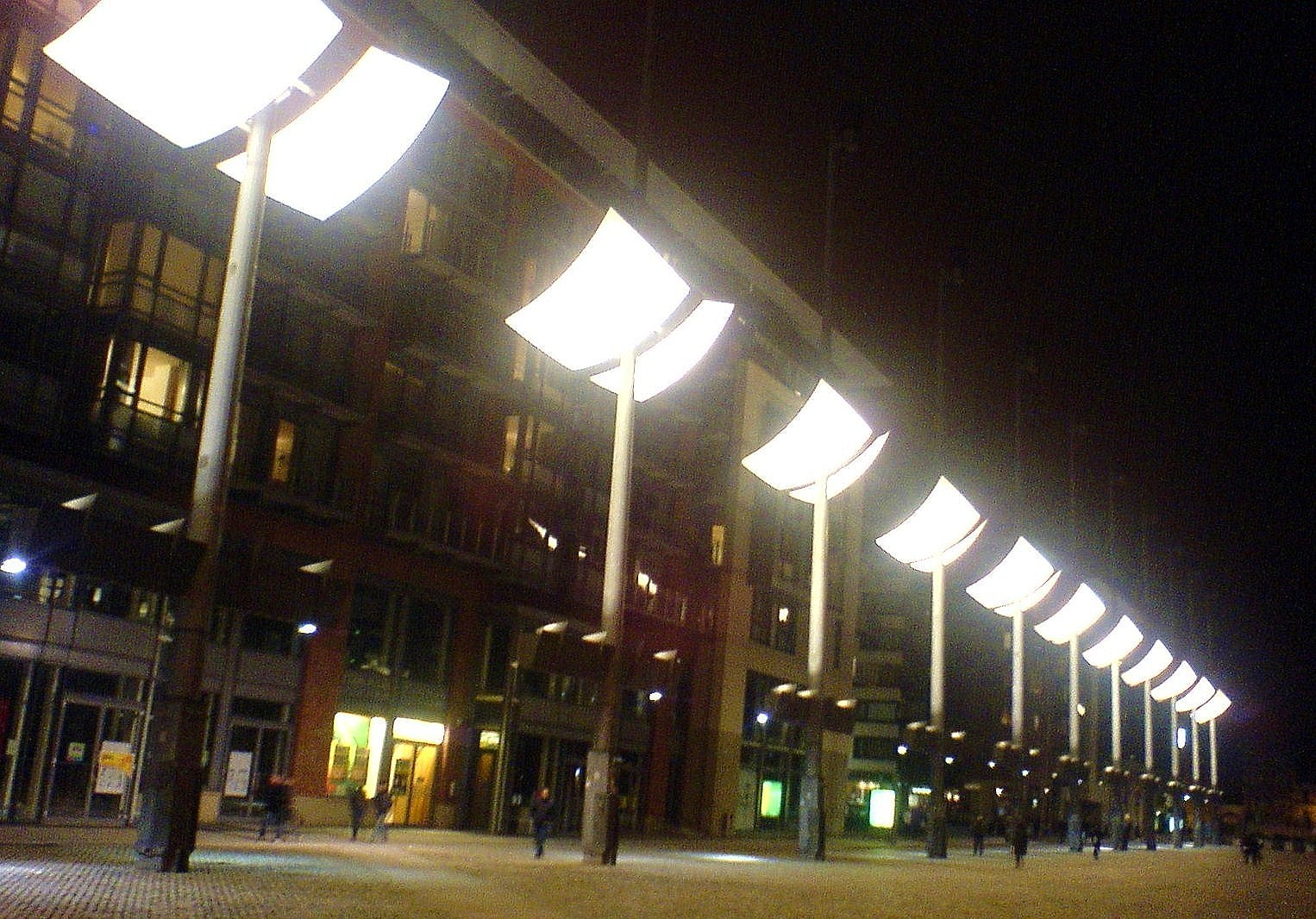
Smithfield Square evening.

The square was used to hold several concerts after its renovation but these were discontinued following complaints from local residents. Although the site has not developed as a Western IFSC as had been originally anticipated (in reference to the city's main financial hub to the east and its related significant white-collar professional residential zones), the plaza is providing a convenient through route for local residents as well as for a number of professionals and users of a range of court and legal-related services and buildings in the area. These range from the Prison Probation Services through to the Family Court and the Law Society of Ireland, amongst others, with Smithfield and Smithfield Market situated in convenient proximity to Dublin's legal/prosecution hub of The Four Courts.

== Horse fair ==
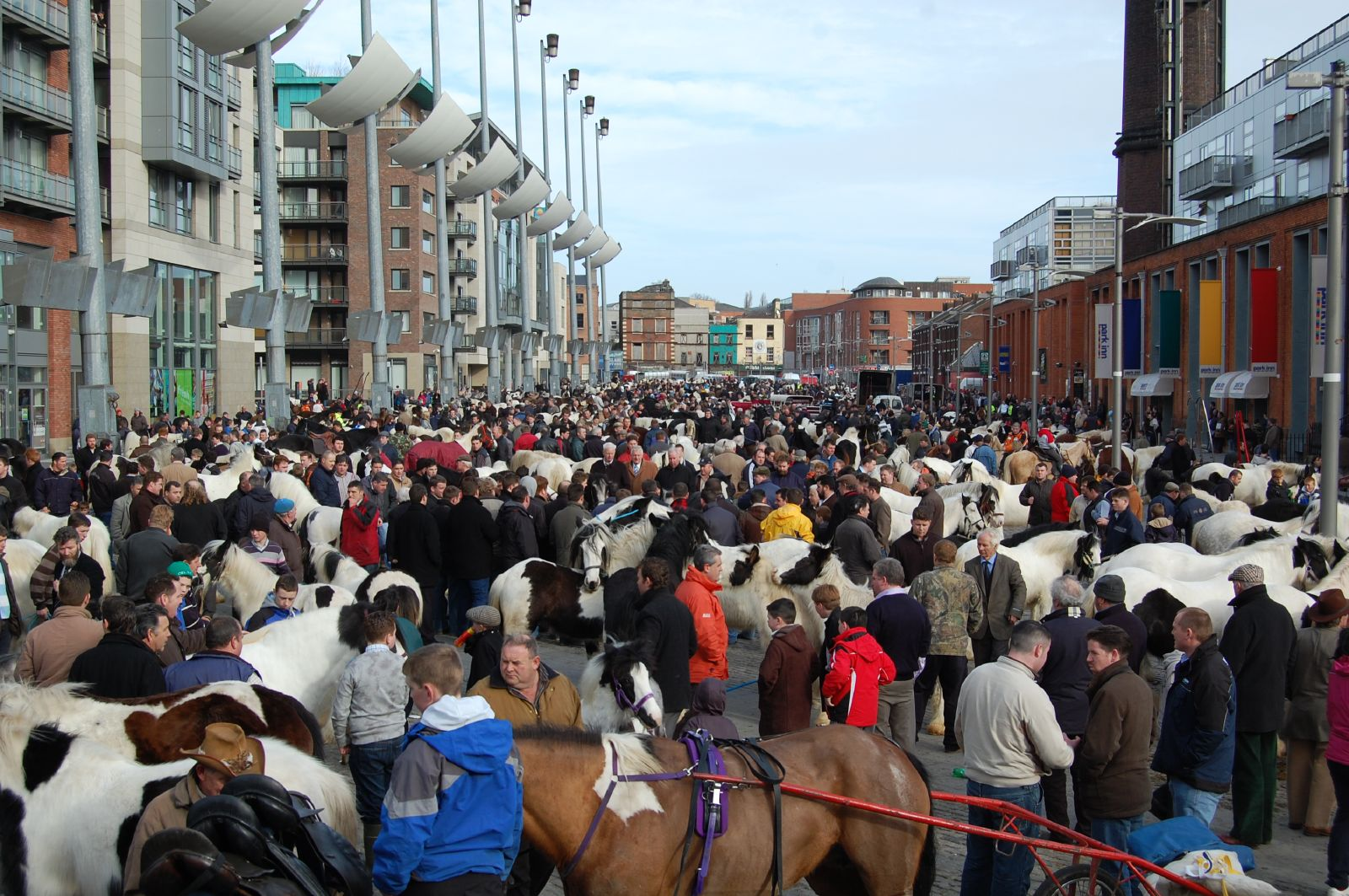
The Smithfield horse market. March 2008.

The area is known for the historical horse market which is held on the first Sunday of March and September.

The Horse Fair used to take place every month. A bye-law passed on 14 January 2013 reduced it to twice a year and this also established some new rules and regulations. The main causes for the change were some violent incidents and objections of nearby residents who are uncomfortable with its atmosphere, noise, perceptions of animal abuse and neglect. The Smithfield Horse Fair continues to draw heavy and sustained criticism from a wide range of sources, including the Garda Síochána and the Dublin Society for Prevention of Cruelty to Animals (DSPCA), legal difficulties in closing down and/or moving away the market, coupled with its centuries-old heritage, have left the city council and the horse fair defenders locked in an ongoing battle without any clear resolution ahead.

== Features ==
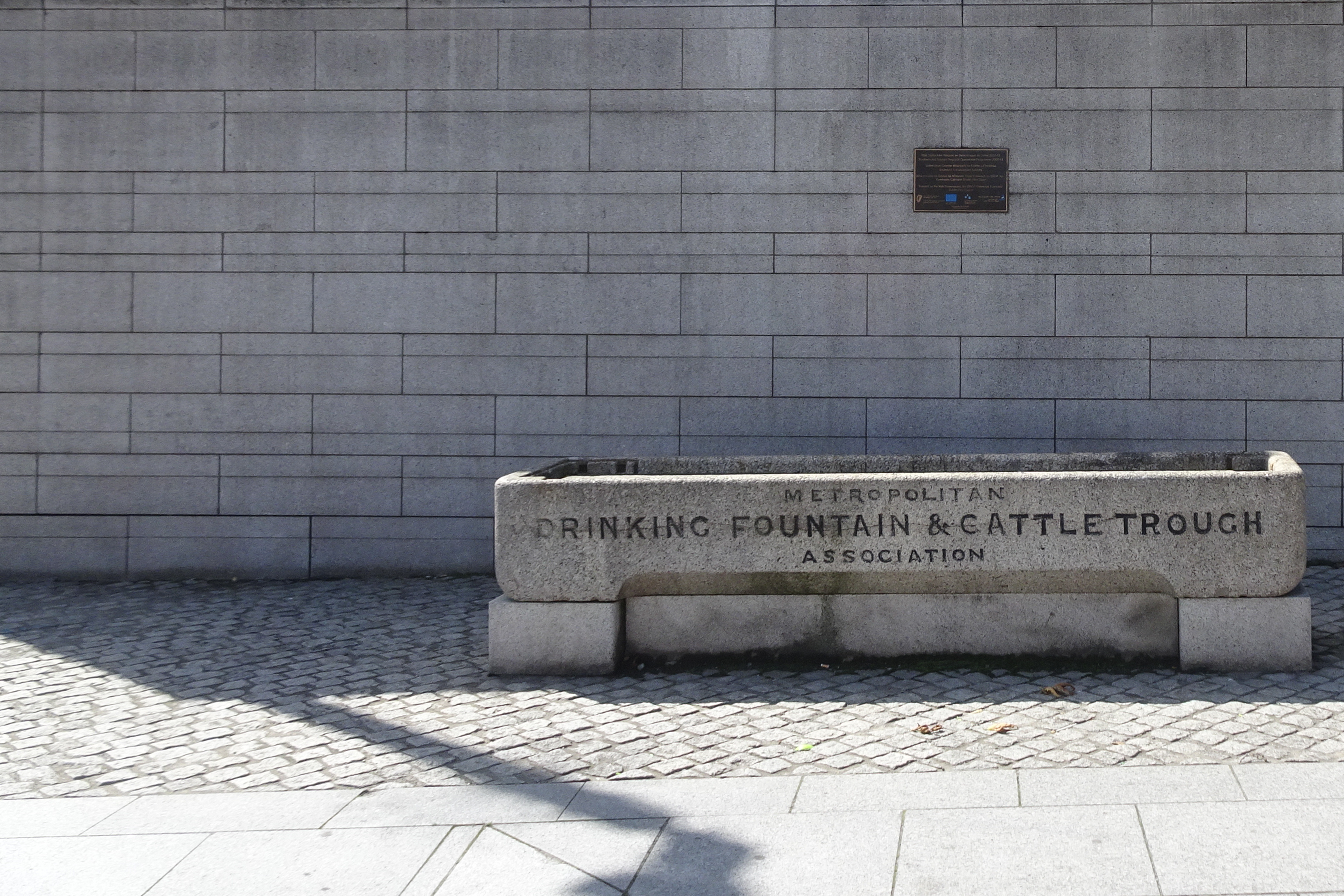
Cattle and horse trough at Smithfield Square

The old Jameson Distillery Chimney tower, and its observation deck, reopened to the public in 2018 after a prolonged closure, however, it has to be accessed via 244 steps rather than the lift as before.

The Light House Cinema was resurrected in May 2008 in Smithfield Square, after it had closed its doors on Abbey Street on 27 September 1996.

The Cobblestone Pub has been a home for Irish Traditional musicians for over thirty years and hosts Irish Traditional music sessions every day of the week. Many well-known Irish musicians have gotten their start playing at the Cobblestone such as John Francis Flynn, Lankum, and Ispíní na hEireann.

Smithfield is home to the Dublin District Children Court, where defendants aged 10 to 17 are tried and sentenced.

== Developments ==
Smithfield may include the satellite, and developing, Museum district to the west, and the Four Courts district to the east. These districts are largely residential and combined with the area around Smithfield Square they comprise the main Liffey river frontage of Dublin 7.

Recent commercial, residential and cultural developments led to the area becoming newly fashionable in the first decade of the 21st century. However, most notably in the period 2008 to 2010, stagnation set in as developments stalled and the Irish economy/property market nose-dived once the post-Celtic Tiger economic recession struck. The significant issues of variable apartment occupancy rates, coupled with closed retail spaces and a number of unfinished and unoccupied commercial units at Smithfield Market have created a highly visible reminder of the economic and community challenges still to be addressed in this historic part of Dublin.

== Transport ==
Smithfield Luas stop is on the Red Line, which skirts the square to the south, providing a convenient link to the nearby city centre, or to the far south of the city, to Tallaght or Saggart.

== Accommodation ==
Several hotels are situated in Smithfield Square itself. The biggest is the 3-star Maldron Hotel Smithfield, with 92 rooms, from junior suites to family rooms. The well-known European accommodation chain Generator is adjacent to Jameson Distillery Bow St, and the newest addition is The Hendrick, which opened in 2019. All three hotels also have their own bars and restaurants.

== External sources ==
- Dublin Historical Record, Vol. 50, No. 2 (Autumn, 1997), pp. 105–118
