= Bolton Street, Dublin =

Street in Dublin, Ireland

Bolton Street
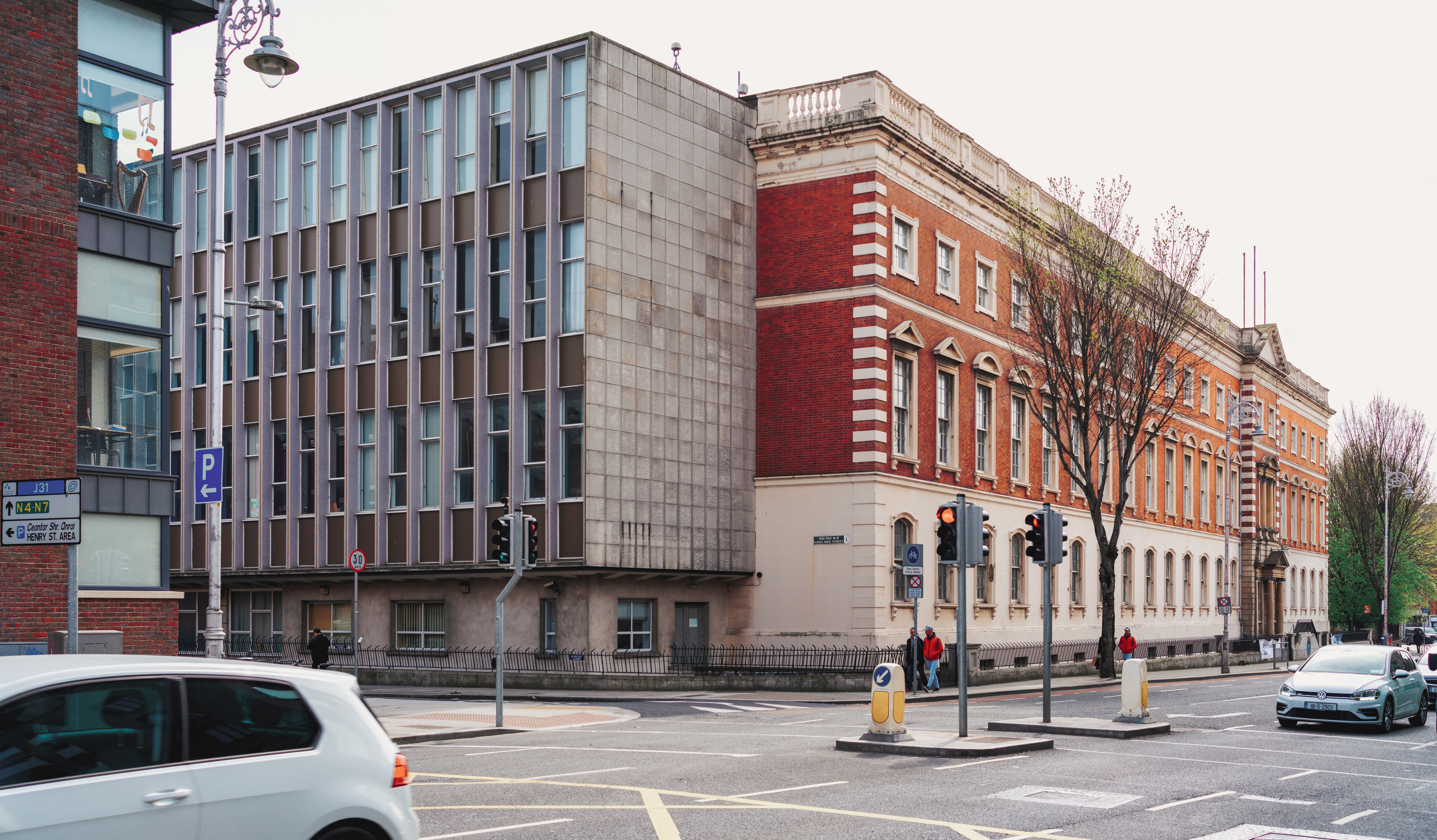
- TUD Bolton Street in 2019
- Interactive map of Bolton Street
- Native name: Sráid Bolton (Irish)
- Namesake: Charles Paulet, 2nd Duke of Bolton
- Location: Dublin, Ireland
- Postal code: D01
- Coordinates: 53°21′04″N 6°16′08″W
- north end: Dorset Street
- south end: North King Street

Bolton Street (Irish: Sráid Bolton) is a street in central Dublin which connects Dorset Street at the north and North King Street to the south.

== History ==
Along with Dorset Street, Bolton Street was historically part of Drumcondra Lane. It was named after the Charles Paulet, 2nd Duke of Bolton, the Lord Lieutenant of Ireland, when the area was redeveloped along with Henrietta Street in 1724.

The street is now synonymous with the former Dublin Institute of Technology (DIT), now Technological University Dublin (TUD), campus on the street known as "Bolton Street". The main facade of the college, which faces onto Bolton Street, was designed by Charles J. McCarthy, the Dublin city architect. Constructed of red brick and Mountcharles sandstone in the Georgian Revival style, it was built between 1907 and 1912.

On 2 June 1963, a tenement building on Bolton Street collapsed, resulting in the death of two people, Leo and Mary Maples an elderly couple, and the injury of others. This collapse came ten days before another similar incident on Fenian Street, in which two children were killed.
