= Grangegorman killings =

Murders in Dublin, Ireland

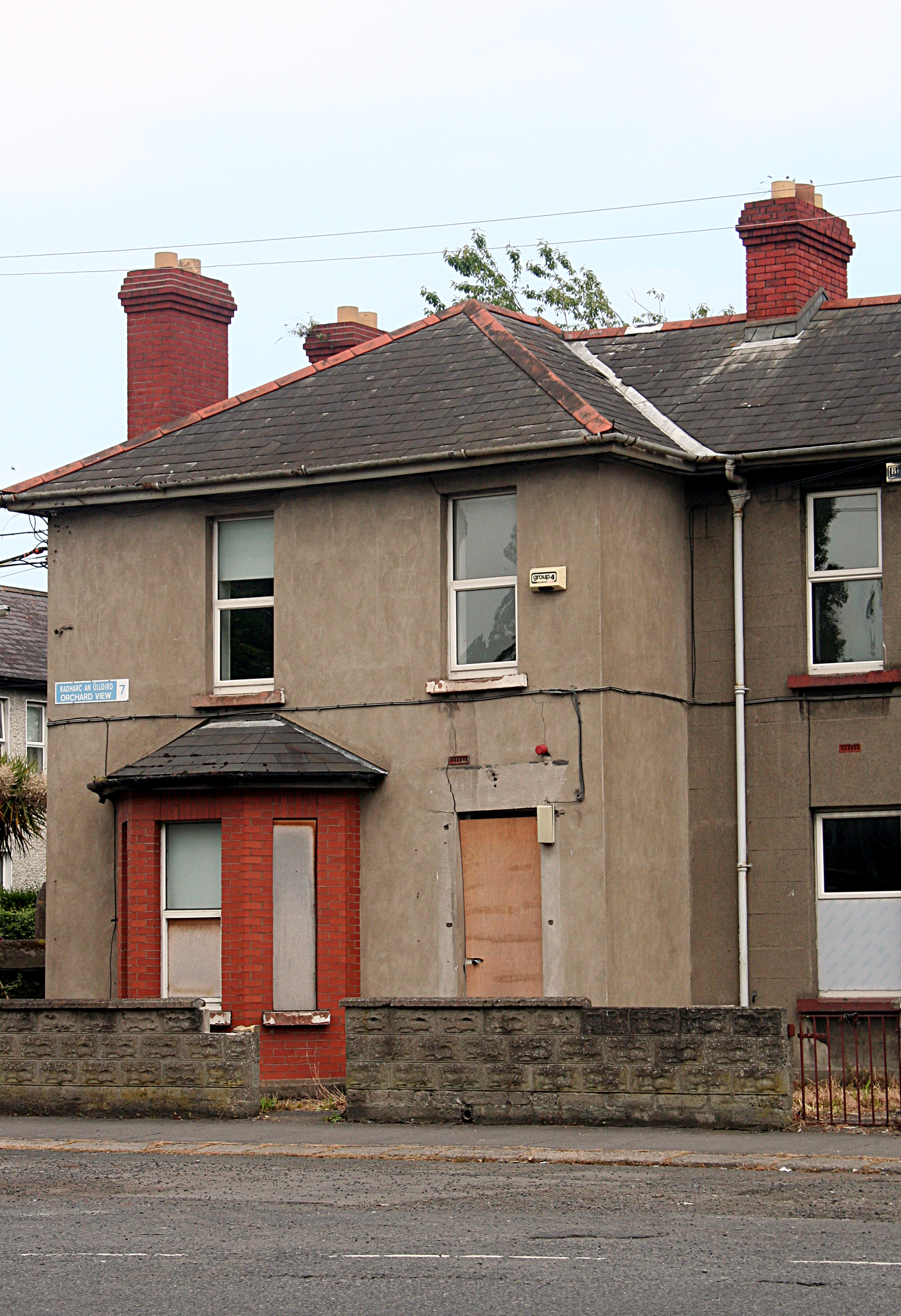
- The house at No.1 Orchard View, Grangegorman
- Date: 6 March 1997
- Location: No.1 Orchard View, Grangegorman, Dublin, Ireland
- Also known as: Grangegorman murders
- Deaths: Sylvia Sheils and Mary Callinan
- Suspects: Dean Lyons, Mark Nash
- Charges: Mark Nash
- Convictions: Mark Nash

The Grangegorman killings were the homicide on 6 March 1997 of Sylvia Sheils and Mary Callinan, patients at St. Brendan's Psychiatric Hospital in Grangegorman, Dublin, Ireland. After giving a false confession, Dean Lyons was charged with the murders and placed on remand. In his statement to the Garda Síochána (police), Lyons gave details that would only be known to the murderer or to the investigators. After Lyons was charged, Mark Nash confessed to the killings, but later retracted his confession. In April 2015, Nash's trial for the murder of Sheils and Callinan began after an unsuccessful attempt to prevent the trial going forward.

Lyons was described by one of the gardaí (policemen) involved in the case as a "Walter Mitty" character, and Charles Smith, psychiatrist and director of the Central Mental Hospital, Dundrum, felt that he might be prone to exaggeration and attention seeking. He spent nine months in jail for a crime that he did not commit, and was released after the charge of murder against him was dropped on 29 April 1998. A commission of investigation was set up to investigate the conduct of the Garda in the case. Dean Lyons died from a heroin overdose in 2000.

== Murders ==
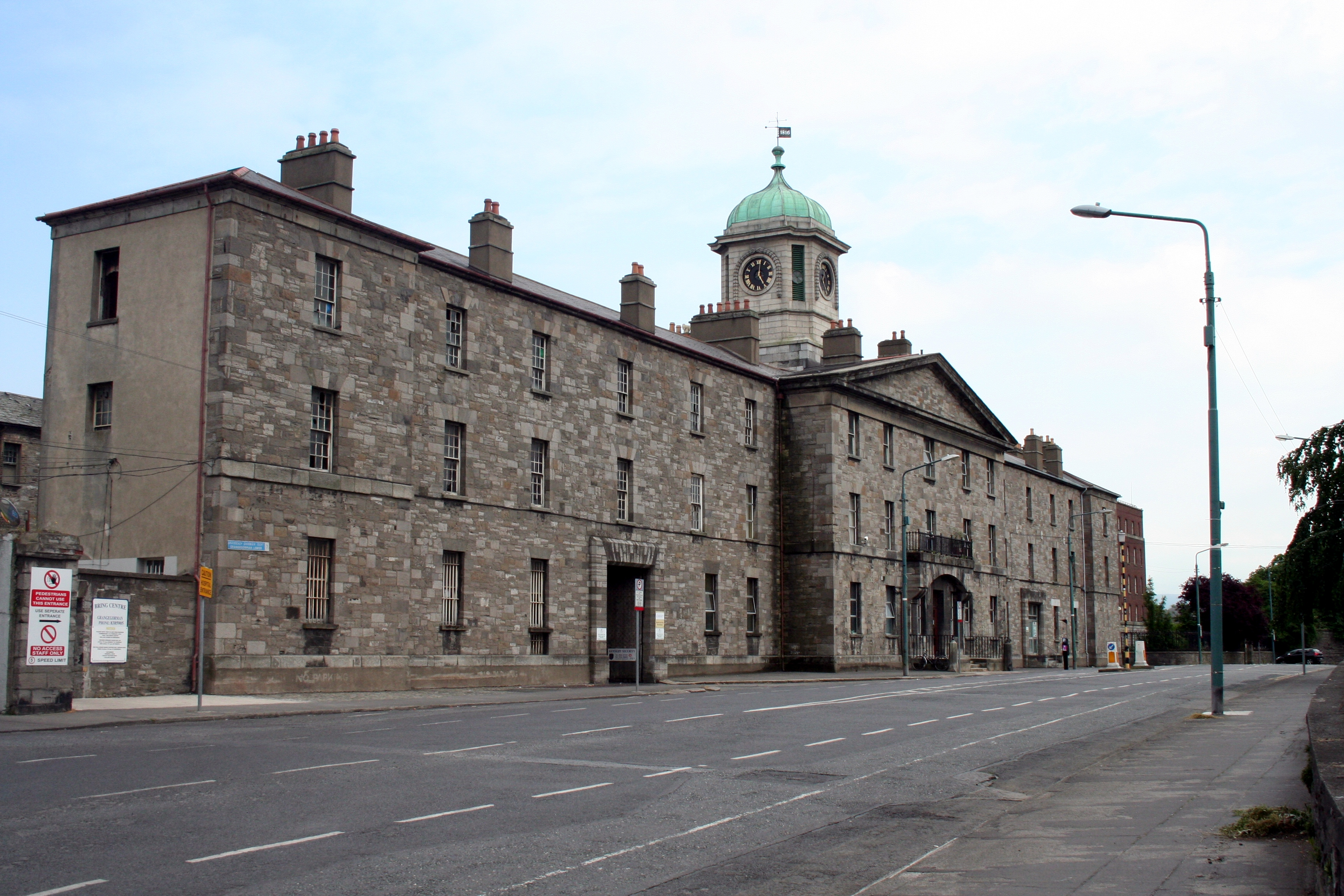
The administration annexe of St. Brendan's Psychiatric Hospital, Grangegorman, formerly the Richmond General Penitentiary

On the morning of 7 March 1997, Sylvia Sheils and Mary Callinan were found dead in No.1 Orchard View, Grangegorman, Dublin, having been stabbed a number of times. They were found by Ann Mernagh, another resident of the house, who raised the alarm at No.5 Orchard View. The address was a two-story end of terrace house owned by the Eastern Health Board and was used to provide sheltered accommodation for outpatients of St Brendan's Psychiatric Hospital. The entire Orchard View area was completely demolished fifteen years after the murders and is now an empty plot surrounded by a wall.

Sheils and Callinan had been repeatedly stabbed, their throats and faces cut. One of the women's genitals had been extensively mutilated, and both women were partially undressed. The level of mutilation had never before been encountered in a murder investigation in Ireland. Neither of the women had been raped, and no semen was found at the scene. The killings were described as "the most brutal murders in Irish criminal history" by the Irish Examiner newspaper

== Initial investigation ==
After the alarm had been raised, a major investigation commenced involving detectives from the Dublin Metropolitan North Central Division and the National Bureau of Criminal Investigation (NBCI). The house and the surrounding area were subject to a forensic examination by the Garda Technical Bureau. Gardaí performed house-to-house inquiries, took more than 1000 statements, and interviewed over 250 suspects. A postmortem examination of the bodies was made by the State Pathologist, Professor John Harbison; his first report was delivered on 13 March 1997. No material was found either by the forensic examination of the scene or by the postmortem examination that would have linked a suspect to the crime.

From the beginning of the investigation until 26 July 1997, the Garda had no main suspect. In April 1997, they engaged a team of criminal psychologists to develop a profile of the killer. Among other items in their initial report, they said that "THE OFFENDER WAS EXTREMELY DANGEROUS AND WAS LIKELY TO REOFFEND" (emphasis in original), and that the killer was likely to have had prior experience of burglary. A local resident had noticed someone acting suspiciously a week or two before the killings; his statement to the Garda was used to make a facial composite:

"I would describe this fellow as about 6-foot to 6-foot 2, aged 35 to 38 years, very slim, had a black moustache, long at the side. He had a stubble which was very noticeable, a week or two's growth. The moustache was much thicker than the stubble. He had dark hair, straight and to the shoulder. His hair was split at the middle in the front and brushed to each side. He had a long thin face. He had dark eyes and dark eyebrows. He was badly dressed as if the clothes did not suit him. He was dirty looking but not scruffy looking. He was wearing jeans that had a flare, blue in colour. He had dirty white runners on. He was wearing an anorak type coat which came down a few inches below the waist. The coat was zipped up and was a bright colour like a bright brown colour without a hood."

As a result of the psychological profile, the Garda broadcast an appeal for information on the RTÉ television programme Crimeline with a request for people whose houses had been broken into in the Grangegorman area to contact them. After interviewing a number of people involved in burglary, they discovered that Dean Lyons had been talking about the killings. Lyons matched the facial composite released by the gardaí and he was questioned on 26 July 1997.

== Dean Lyons ==
Dean Lyons was born on 20 April 1973; he was 24 when he was arrested. He grew up in Tallaght in southwest Dublin, the fourth in a family of six children. He went to Scoil Aonghusa National School in Tallaght, where he had some difficulty with his schoolwork. According to his teachers, in today's terms, he would have been classified as having a moderate general learning disability. He was assessed by a psychologist when he was in sixth class, around the age of twelve, who found him to have an intelligence quotient of 70. As a result of the psychologist's report, Lyons was moved to St. Joseph's Special School in Tallaght. During his period in St. Joseph's, he developed a reputation for attention-seeking and storytelling. After school, he never held down a steady job and drifted into heroin addiction and homelessness. At the time of his arrest for the Grangegorman murders, he had one conviction for burglary and had been involved in a number of syringe robberies.

=== First interview and arrest ===
At the time of Lyons' first interview with the gardaí, he was staying at the Salvation Army hostel in Grangegorman. Detective Garda William Mullis and Garda Joseph O'Connor approached him as he was leaving the hostel. They reported that Lyons said: "I think I know what this is about". The gardaí brought Lyons to the Bridewell garda station, and interviewed him in the doctor's room. According to the gardaí, at one point during the interview, Lyons burst out crying and said that he had killed the two women. Lyons claimed that he was suffering withdrawal symptoms at the time and that he made the admission so that he could get more drugs. He said that Garda O'Connor had promised that the sooner he confessed, the sooner he would be released from custody and that he "wasn't thinking straight". The gardaí say that he was told that he was not under arrest and that he could leave at any time. As a result of his confession, Dean Lyons was arrested on suspicion of murdering the two women at 13:46 on 26 July 1997.

Lyons' admissions during the first interview were not very detailed, and many of the details provided did not match the evidence. Lyons gave incorrect information about the precise location of the killings and about the number of weapons used. During the interview, he was confused about the number of people that had been killed, and he thought that the women were awake, and moving about the house at the time, which conflicted with the forensic evidence.

=== Subsequent interviews ===
While the first interview was videotaped, at the beginning of the second interview, Lyons said that he wanted the video recording to be stopped. It has been alleged that the decision to terminate the recording was prompted by the gardaí before the start of the second interview. A number of items discussed during the second interview were not included on the formal interview record, including anecdotes told by Lyons about his former criminal activity which gardaí believed at the time to be untrue. As the interview continued, Lyons was asked if he wanted to make a formal statement, to which he agreed. This statement contains a number of points about the killings that were not known to the public at the time. Some of the more glaring inaccuracies mentioned in the first interview are not included in the statement, although this statement contains some notable omissions and inaccuracies.

Midway through the interview, Lyons was allowed a break, during which he was seen by a doctor, and was given medication. He also met his father during this break. He told his father that he had committed the murder, to which his father replied: "Dean, you are a terrible liar". The gardaí had an informal meeting during the break, during which some gardaí expressed unease about Dean Lyons; Detective Garda Cox described him as a "Walter Mitty" character during this meeting. There are some significant changes in Lyons' story after the break. For example: prior to the break, he claimed that he had used only one knife and after the break, he said that he had used four separate weapons, including electric carving knives. The latter description matches closely to Professor Harbison's report. A number of detailed descriptions were given which matched closely with the physical evidence and with the psychological profile.

=== Doubts about Dean Lyons' testimony ===
As mentioned, some of the gardaí had expressed doubts about Lyons while he was being interviewed. Charles Smith found his confession unconvincing and expressed his concerns to Lyons' solicitor while Lyons was on remand. Gísli Guðjónsson, a psychologist engaged by Lyons' solicitors, found that he was very suggestible and susceptible to leading questions. The commission of investigation pointed out the following exchange as an example of Lyons changing his position in response to a question:

Dean Lyons (DL): "I met two women at the top of the stairs and I went mad because they started screaming and I stabbed them."

Detective Garda Cox (DC): "I have to put it to you that you are not telling the truth at this stage, is that correct."

DL: "It's months ago and it is not easy to remember when you are on gear because it fucks your head up."

DC: "Is it that you don't remember or is it that you don't want to remember."

DL: No reply.

DC: "Can you describe the first woman that you met and what room she came out of."

DL: "It was the second room from the top of the stairs and she was stout about one or two inches smaller than me and she had grey shoulder length hair. She was wearing a very light nightdress."

Detective Sergeant McNulty: "What happened when you met her."

DL: "I stabbed her a few times to stop her screaming."

DC: "I put it to you that this did not happen in the hallway but happened in the bedroom, would you agree."

DL: "Yes."

== Mark Nash's confession ==
In August 1997, Carl Doyle and his wife Catherine Doyle were stabbed to death in Ballintober, County Roscommon by Mark Nash, a 25-year-old resident of Drumcondra in North Dublin. During his interview with the gardaí, he said that about three months prior to his arrest, as he was walking to Stoneybatter, he broke into a house through the back, and had stabbed two women in their sleep. In his statement, there were at least two aspects of the crime scene that were not known to the public at the time. Nash later retracted his confession. Nash's confession caused some consternation amongst the gardaí, as Dean Lyons had been charged at that point and was on remand awaiting trial. Two camps emerged within the gardaí, one which believed that Nash's confession threw doubt on Lyons' guilt, the other which believed that Lyons was the murderer. On 27 August 1997, the Garda Commissioner appointed Assistant Commissioner James McHugh to carry out a review of the available evidence. He released a preliminary report on 10 September 1997, and an interim report on 9 January 1998; while these reports did not come to a conclusion about Lyons' guilt, they did raise a number of doubts about his testimony.

== Lyons exonerated ==
As a result of Assistant Commissioner McHugh's investigation and due to the defence solicitor's refusal to release Gísli's report, the Director of Public Prosecutions' office appointed a psychologist, Adrian Grounds, to assess Dean Lyons. Grounds concluded that Dean Lyons was highly suggestible and that his admissions were unreliable:

"I am not in a position to corroborate Mr Lyons' account of being corrected, prompted and advised by Garda officers and his description of learning from them about the details of the admissions they were seeking. However Mr Lyons' account to me in our interview supported and was consistent with the earlier impressions I had gained from reading the case papers. In my earlier report I noted that the materials then available to me raised questions about whether the details of Mr Lyons' final admissions could have derived from the content of questions put to him during the day, rather than his knowledge and memory, and about whether he was unusually suggestible. Following my interview with Dean Lyons and his parents, these concerns are substantially strengthened and I now think that it is very likely that his detailed admissions were unreliable."

As a result of Grounds' report, the charge of murder against Dean Lyons was dropped on 29 April 1998; he had been imprisoned on remand for nine months. Lyons died in 2000 of a heroin overdose. In 2005, the Garda Síochána published an apology to the Lyons family for Dean Lyons' arrest and detention in national newspapers.

== Commission of investigation ==
In February 2006, a commission of investigation was established to investigate the circumstances surrounding Dean Lyons' confession and arrest. Its sole member was George Birmingham, a senior counsel. The commission's terms of reference are stated below:

To undertake a thorough investigation and make a report in accordance with the provisions of section 32 of the Commission of Investigation Act 2004 (No. 23 of 2004) on the following specific matters:

1) the circumstances surrounding the making of a confession by Dean Lyons (deceased) about the deaths of Ms Mary Callinan and Ms Sylvia Sheils in March 1997 in Grangegorman Dublin 7,

2) the adequacy of the Garda assessment of the reliability of Mr Lyons' confession both before and after he was charged with murder, and

3) the adequacy of information provided by the Garda Síochána on the morning of 27 July 1997 to the Director of Public Prosecutions and in particular whether any additional information should have been provided at that time.

=== Leaking of report ===
In 2006, Robert McNulty leaked the draft report of the commission to the Evening Herald newspaper before it was publicly available. McNulty was one of the detectives who interviewed Dean Lyons after he made his initial confession; he received a suspended jail sentence of twelve months and a €5000 fine for leaking the report.

=== Commission findings ===
The commission found that Lyons acquired the detailed information in his statement from gardaí: "Dean Lyons acquired the detailed information in relation to the crimes which is a feature of later interviews, and in particular the third interview, from the gardaí who were interviewing him." The commission found that: "The written record maintained of the non-video-recorded interviews is not comprehensive and matters are excluded that would have assisted in the assessment of the reliability of Dean Lyons. This is not in accordance with section 12 (11) (b)(i) of the Criminal Justice Act (Treatment of Persons in Custody in Garda Síochána Stations) Regulations 1987." The report said that Dean Lyons was not abused or ill-treated during his detention and that:

His admissions were not produced by oppression or coercive conduct on the part of the Gardaí. Neither were the admissions produced as a result of anything in the nature of a bribe or inducement. There was no deliberate attempt to frame Dean Lyons. However, Dean Lyons was able to provide accurate details of murders it is now accepted that he did not commit, due to the manner in which he was interviewed by gardaí. He wished to associate himself with the murders and readily agreed to leading questions which were asked by interviewing gardaí.

== Trial and conviction of Mark Nash ==
Nash was convicted of the Roscommon murders in October 1998 and sentenced to life imprisonment. In July 1998 the Garda recommended charging him for the Grangegorman murders, and in September 1999 the Director of Public Prosecutions (DPP) said this should be done when the Book of Evidence was complete. In November 2000, shortly after Lyons' death, the DPP and Garda agreed that no charges should be brought against Nash in the short term, but the case would remain open. As Nash was already in prison, the urgency was less, and pressure of other work meant the Forensic Science Laboratory was slow to test items of evidence. In July 2009, a "spectacular breakthrough" came when new DNA tests showed the victims' blood on Nash's jacket. Nash was formally charged with the murders in October 2009. He launched a legal challenge, claiming excessive delay and negative publicity would prevent a fair trial. This was rejected by Michael Moriarty in the High Court in 2012, and confirmed on appeal to the Supreme Court in January 2015. In March 2015, Nash was put on trial for the murders. In April he was found guilty and sentenced to life imprisonment. The judge refused to backdate the sentence to the direction to charge Nash or his original arrest in 1999. The jury was excused from jury service for life.

== Links to other crimes ==
In 2015, it was reported that Mark Nash had been questioned in 1997 over the murder of Dorothy Wood but had been ruled out as a suspect. The 94-year-old was found suffocated in her bed in Huddersfield on 7 May 1996. In 1998 a man was jailed for seven years for the murder but he was released in 2004 due to a miscarriage of justice.
