= North Brunswick Street =

Street in Dublin, Ireland

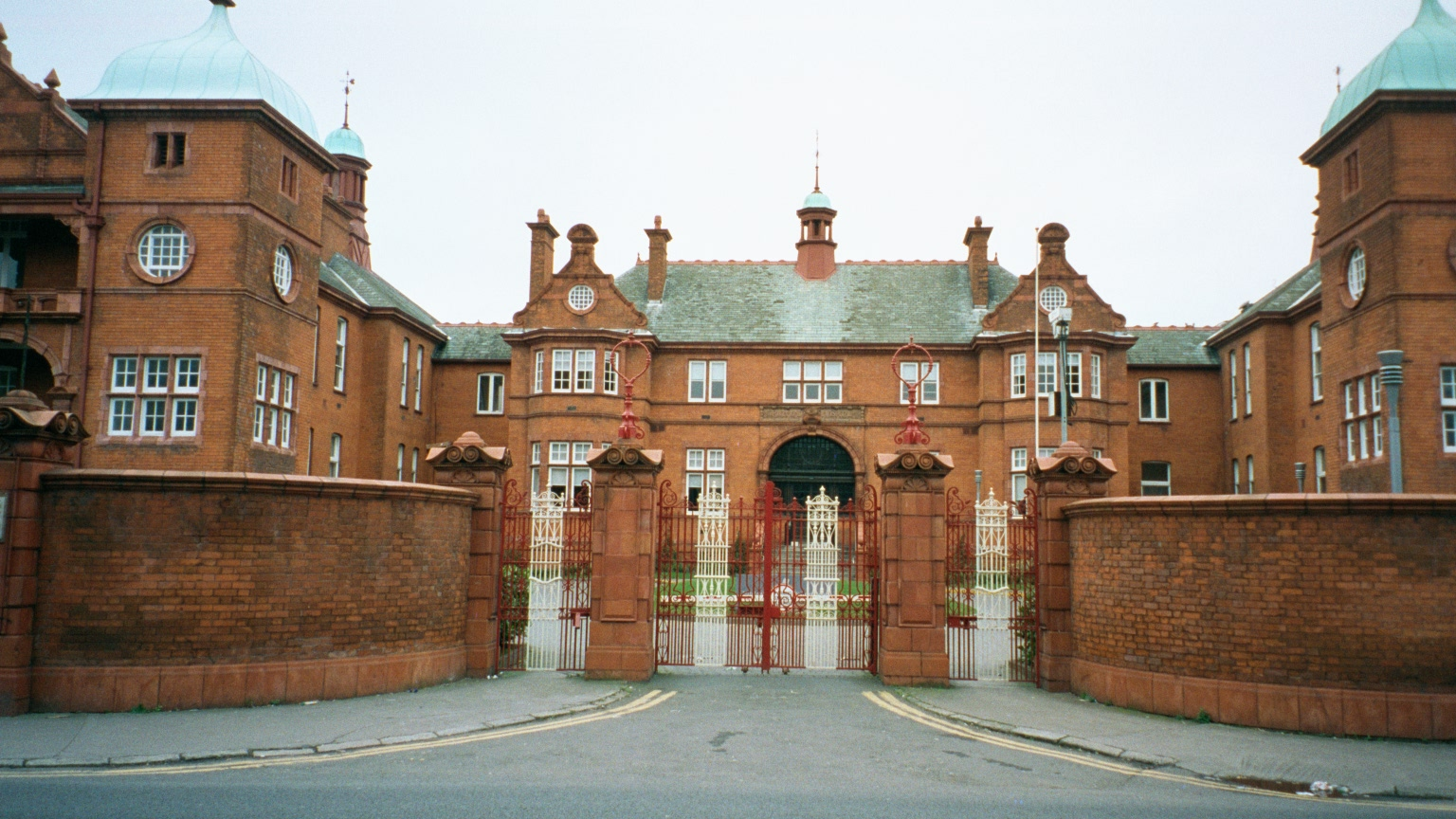
- The Dublin Courthouse. Formerly the Richmond Surgical Hospital

- Location within Central Dublin
- Native name: Sráid Brunswick Thuaidh (Irish)
- Former name: Channel Row
- Namesake: House of Brunswick
- Location: Dublin, Ireland
- Postal code: D7
- West end: Stoneybatter
- East end: Church Street

Other
- Known for: Hospitals, prisons, jails and penal and welfare institutions

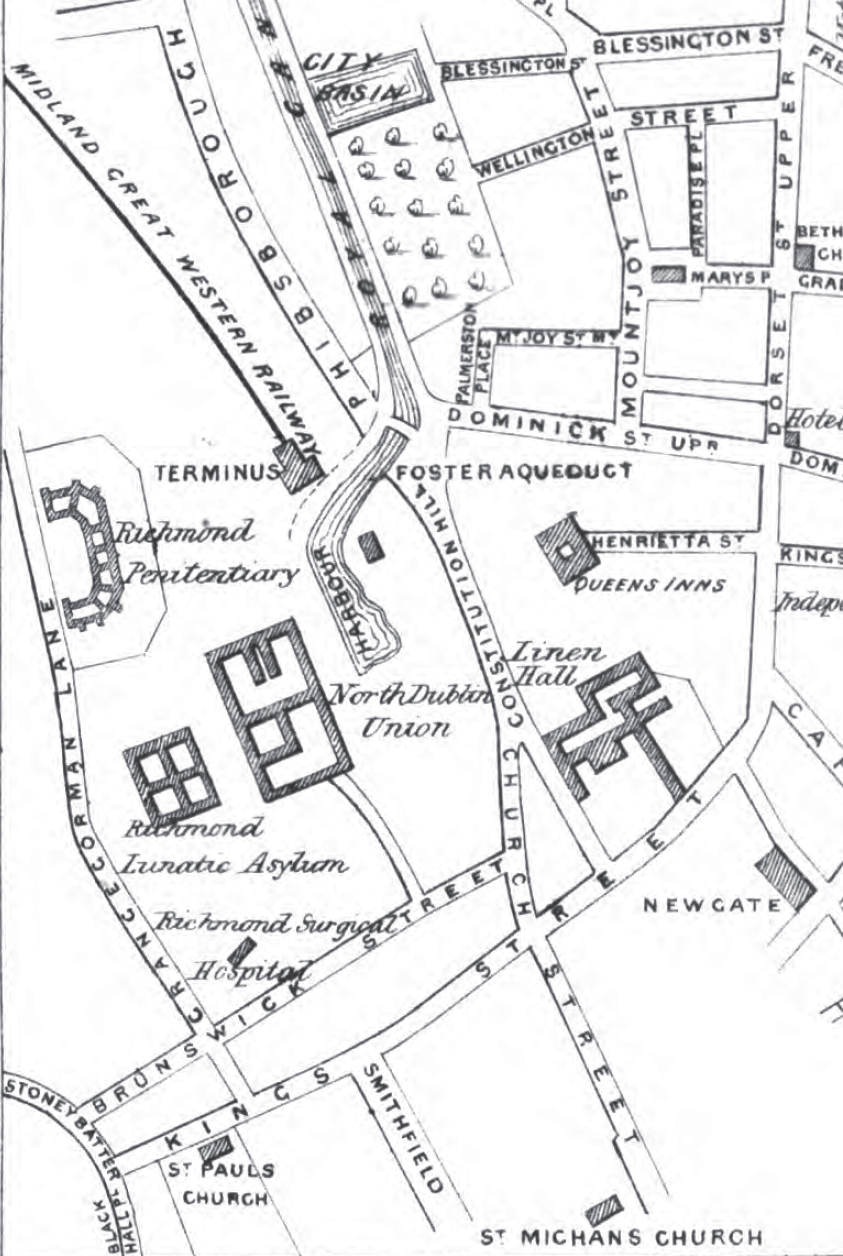
Richmond District Asylum and North Dublin Union

North Brunswick Street (Irish: Sráid Brunswick Thuaidh) is a street on the northside of Dublin, Ireland. It runs from the junction of Stoneybatter in the east to Church Street in the west and runs parallel to North King Street further south. It is located between the areas of Grangegorman to the north and Smithfield to the south. The street is named for the House of Brunswick, holders of the British and Irish crown from 1714 to 1901.

It was formerly named Channel Row (Irish: Raidh na Canálach, meaning 'Canal row') which likely originated from a channel connected with the Bradogue River.

It is not to be confused with Great Brunswick Street (later renamed Pearse Street) on the south side of the city.

== History ==
The street formed from medieval times as a natural connecting point between two of the main routes out of the city before the River Liffey's tidal estuary. It is likely partially shown as a laneway off Church Street just north of St. Michan's Church on John Speed's Map of Dublin (1610).

The area around the street was already connected with institutional use from the building of the nearby Linehall in 1728.

By the time of John Rocques's map of 1756, it is firmly shown as Channel Row with buildings taking up most of both its northern and southern sides.

In 1773, Dublin's second house of industry opened in a former malthouse on the street. By 1790 the building was deemed to be in danger of collapse and a new building was designed and built to the plans of the architect Richard Johnston with work commencing in September 1791.

By the 19th century, the street and surrounding area became the location of various medical, penal and welfare institutions including Hardwicke Fever Hospital (1803), Richmond Surgical Hospital (1810), St. Brendan's Hospital, Dublin (1815), Whitworth Hospital (1816), Richmond General Penitentiary (1820), North Dublin Union (1840) and the Carmichael School of Medicine (1864).

Many of the buildings now form elements of the Grangegorman campus of the Technological University Dublin.
