= George Stapleton =

Irish stuccodore (1777–1841)

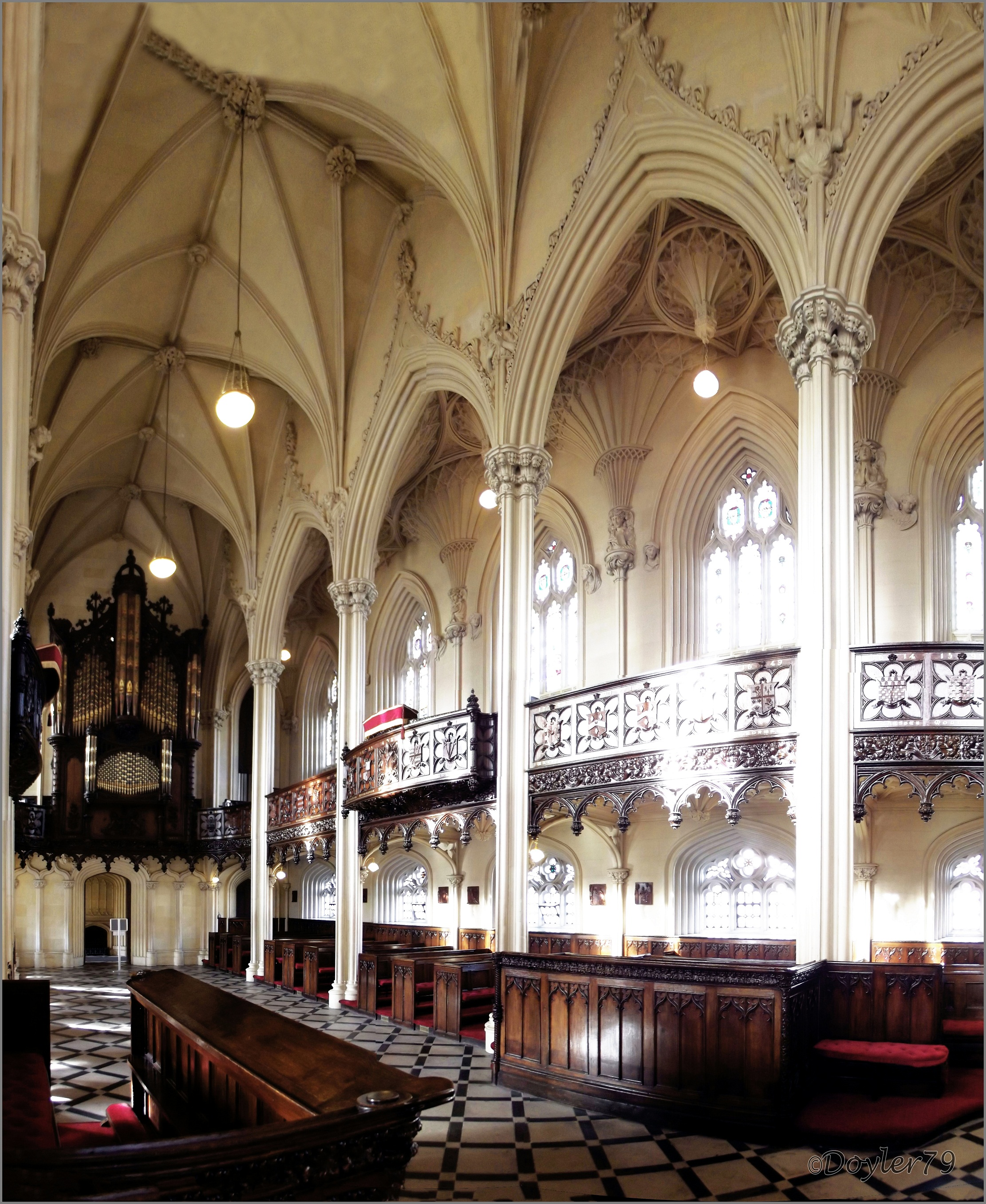
Interior of the Chapel Royal, showing the work of George Stapleton

George Stapleton (1777, in Dublin, Ireland – 1841, in Dublin) was a prominent Irish stuccodore, son of Michael Stapleton.

== Life ==
Stapleton was first listed in the Dublin Directory in 1817 as a plasterer residing at No. 1 Mountjoy Place (which was built by his father). Between 1818 and 1828 he was listed as a "Stucco-worker and builder". His addresses were given both as Mountjoy Place and The Casino, Roebuck, the former home of Robert Emmet. He married Anastasia Bodkin, of Galway, in 1806, and they had five children: Michael, first surgeon in the Mater Hospital, George and Thomas, who went into law, Maria, who married William Conlan of the brewing family, and Olivia who married Count James Nugent.

== Plaster work ==
From 1802 to 1824 he was employed at Trinity College, Dublin.

Around 1802 he also started working with Francis Johnston, the leading architect of the time in Ireland.

Among buildings in Dublin that he decorated are:

- Chapel Royal (Dublin Castle) (1807-1814)
- Dublin Castle (1809-1821)
- The King's Bench and the Rolls Court of Admiralty (1812)
- The Court of the Exchequer
- The Richmond Penitentiary, Grangegorman (designed by Johnston, 1816)
- The Chief Secretary's Lodge (known since the 1970s as "Deerfield", now the official residence of the United States Ambassador to Ireland) (1815)
- The Vice Regal Lodge, now Áras an Uachtaráin, official residence of the President of Ireland
- St. George's Church, Hardwicke Place (designed by Johnston)

Other buildings:

- Ballynegall House, Co. Westmeath.

== Houses ==
Stapleton built a number of houses in Dublin, including three in Middle Abbey Street, one in Middle Gardiner Street and one in Gregg's Lane (now Cathal Brugha Street).

== Sources ==
- Lucey, Conor (2007). The Stapleton Collection: Designs for the Irish neoclassical interior. Tralee: Churchill Press. ISBN 978-0-9550246-2-7.
