= Brunswick Street =

Brunswick Street may refer to:

- Brunswick Street, Brisbane, Australia
  - Brunswick Street railway station, former name of Fortitude Valley railway station, Brisbane
- Brunswick Street, Melbourne, Australia
  - Brunswick Street Oval, Australian rules football and cricket ground
- Great Brunswick Street, Dublin Ireland, former name of Pearse Street
- North Brunswick Street, Dublin, Ireland, a street on the North side of the city of Dublin
