= Bradogue River =

Small culverted watercourse, Dublin, Ireland

Bradogue River Bradoge, Bradok, Glascoynock, the Pole Water, St Michan's Streams, Le Rughdich
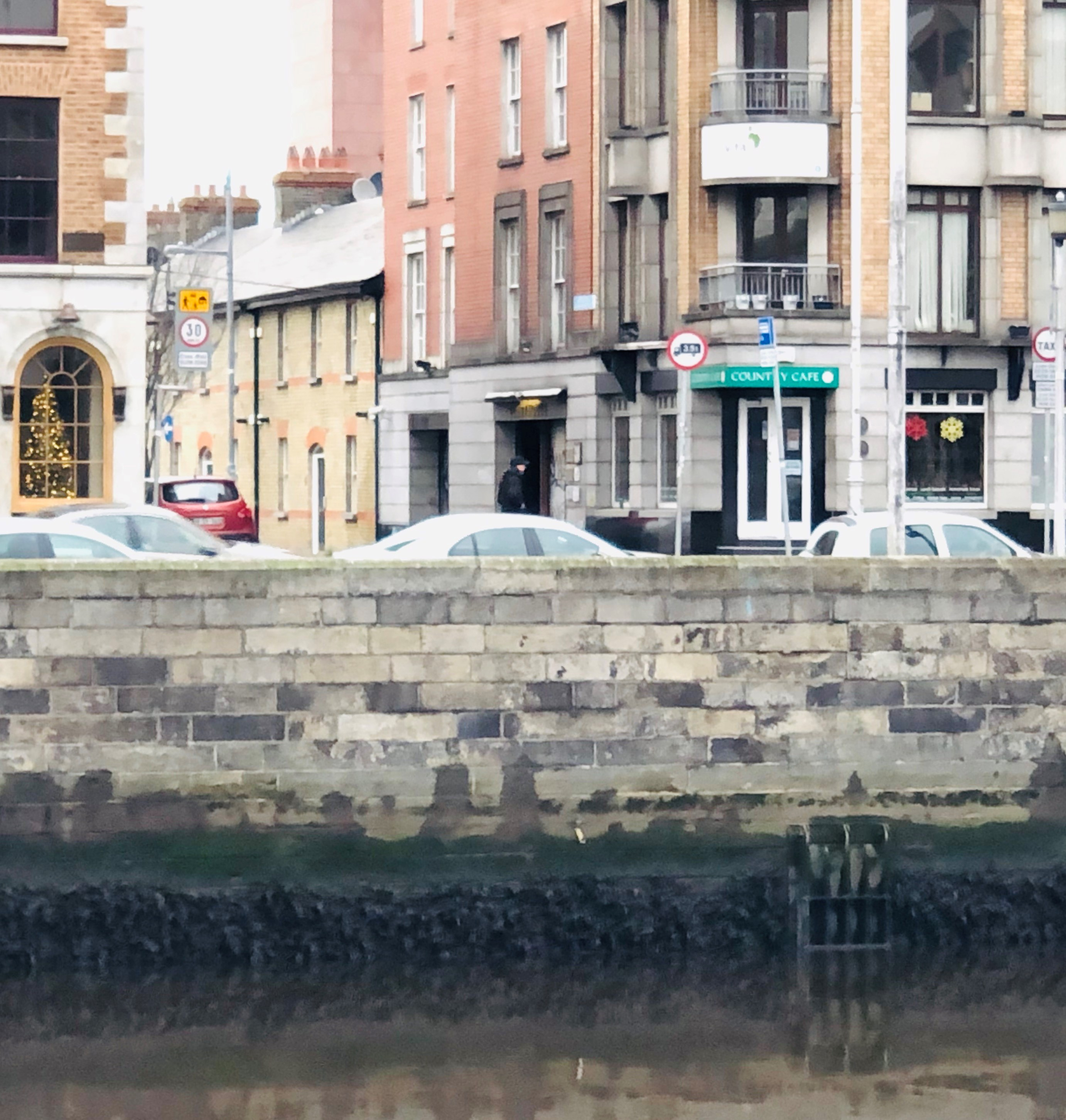
- Main outfall of the Bradogue River from culvert to River Liffey, Ormond Quay
- Etymology: Bradóg = young salmon, others in article
- Native name: Bradóg (Irish)

Physical characteristics
- Source: Cabra
- Mouth: River Liffey
  - location: Ormond Quay
  - coordinates: 53.3458°N 6.2698°W
- Discharge
  - location: Ormond Quay

Basin features
- River system: River Liffey

The Bradogue River is a small river in Dublin, Ireland. It rises in Cabra and flows into the Liffey, with its primary outfall at Ormond Quay. It is culverted for its entire course.

== Names and etymology ==
The river has mainly been known as the Bradogue (or variations on that including Bradoge, Bradok and Braddock) since at least the 18th century, but the river has also been known by other names too, including Glascoynock, St Michan's Streams, the Pole Water, and Le Rughdich.

Bradogue (Bradóg in Irish) means young salmon. Glascoynock is a corruption of Glasmacanóg, the stream of Canoc (Canoc was a Welsh-Irish saint), and this is the name most often encountered from Viking times to the 18th century. The St Michan's name arose from similar origins when the Norse of Dublin were forced to move to the Oxmanstown suburb by the Anglo-Normans who had taken control of the walled city. Pole Water is probably a corruption of Pill Water, referring to the Pill, the muddy area with multiple mouths from the small river to the historically unwalled Liffey.

== Course ==
=== Overview ===
The path of the river has been described as upper or outer Cabra, North Circular Road, Grangegorman, Henrietta Street, Bolton Street, East Arran Street and Ormond Quay, and it is now culverted and integrated with municipal drainage.

=== Detail ===
The source of the river was historically near the meeting of what are now the Ratoath Road and Nephin Road (previously Blind Lane), now lying within the eastern side of the Pope John Paul II Park in western Cabra. After a spring-fed branch joins, its line continues east, and at the meeting of Drumcliff and Carnlough Roads the bulk of the early flow is taken north to the River Tolka by an intercepting sewer, with an overflow continuing on the historic course, going under the railway to reach eastern Cabra. The river passes the North Circular Road between Royal and Charleville Terraces and its course is reflected in some property boundaries in the upper parts of Grangegorman. It enters the Grangegorman campus, built for the Dublin Institute of Technology and now part of the Technological University of Dublin and exits to pass through the Broadstone Railway Terminal lands (now a bus depot). At this point a branch line was constructed at some point, taking some of the flow more directly to the Liffey.

The historical Bradogue course passed under the former Royal Canal harbour and the meeting of Constitution Hill and Broadstone Road. Broadstone is possibly a development from Bradoge-Steyn, the Norse steyn referring to a simple stone bridging of the river at this low point. Passing along the northern edge of the King's Inns grounds, the flow parallels Dominick Street and touches Henrietta Lane and Bolton Street, then turns sharply to the southwest. It follows Kings Street, Green Street and Halston Street and Mary's Lane, passes the former Fruit and Vegetable Market, and crosses under Ormond Square. The main flow is taken into general sewers at this point, but the course does reach the Liffey at Ormond Quay.

The secondary course which separates at Broadstone runs to North Brunswick Street (formerly Channel Row), Red Cow Lane, King Street North, and under Smithfield, past the distillery site, Arran Street North, reaching the Liffey downstream of Mellowes Bridge (the former Queen Maev Bridge).

== 21st century ==
The idea of "deculverting" part of the Bradogue's course was discussed when the Dublin Institute of Technology campus at Grangegorman was being planned.
