= Grangegorman Development Agency =

Coordinates: 53°21.3′N 6°16.6′W

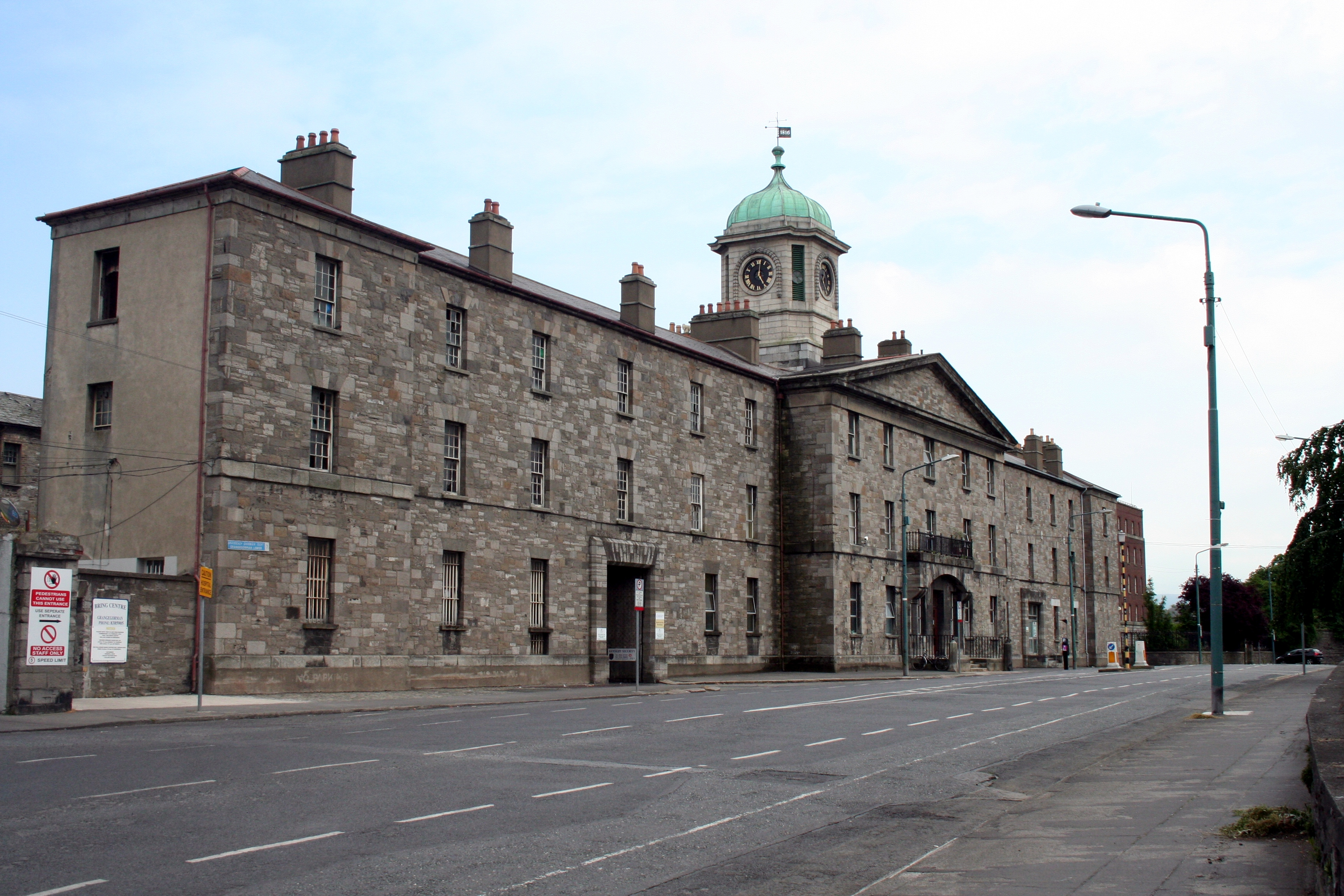
This is the administration annexe of St. Brendan's Psychiatric Hospital, Grangegorman, formerly the Richmond General Penitentiary

Grangegorman Development Agency is an agency of the Government of Ireland charged with redevelopment of the Grangegorman Urban Quarter, formerly within the curtilage of St. Brendan's Hospital. Grangegorman (Irish: Gráinseach Ghormáin) itself is an inner city area on the Northside of Dublin. Grangegorman, at 29 hectares, was the largest undeveloped site in the City of Dublin.

== Grangegorman Quarter ==
The New Grangegorman Urban Quarter is a proposed education, health and community development by the Grangegorman Development Agency for Dublin Institute of Technology and the Health Service Executive within the existing Grangegorman Urban quarter. The site's design has been provided by the American architectural firm of Moore Ruble Yudell under the direction of Irish-born Architect James Mary O'Connor. The surrounding community is an equal stakeholder in the project and receives technical support from the Grangegorman Community Forum. On 17 July 2012, The Grangegorman Development Agency was awarded funding from the Irish Government as a part of a €2.5 billion stimulus package for the country.

=== Dublin Institute of Technology (DIT) Grangegorman Campus ===
The first construction work to take place as part of the new DIT campus started in 2013 with the extensive refurbishment of several listed buildings. These accommodate 1,400 staff and students, who moved in 2014. A further 10,000 staff and students will move by 2017 into two major quads which are being built as public private partnerships. When fully completed Grangegorman will accommodate over 20,000 staff and students and for the first time all DIT activities, currently in 39 buildings, will be located on one integrated campus. September 2014 saw 1000 students from Art, Design, Photography, Social Sciences and Visual Communication move onto campus.

Location of
Dublin Institute of Technology
campus at Grangegorman in central Dublin

=== Transport Links ===
Stops named 'Grangegorman' and 'Broadstone-University' on the LUAS green line link the campus to other parts of the city centre and to Broombridge railway station.

=== HSE Facilities ===
The new replacement facility for St. Brendans Hospital, the Phoenix Care Centre, was opened 1 March 2013. A new primary care centre has been in operation since January 2018.

== St. Brendan's Hospital ==
Officially opened in 1815, although it received its first patients in 1814, the Richmond Lunatic Asylum was initially created as a national institution for the reception of recoverable lunatics. On the 30 July 1830 the asylum was incorporated into the national system of district asylums and was renamed the Richmond Lunatic District Asylum. Under the district asylum system it received patients resident in the city and county of Dublin and the counties of Louth, Meath, Wicklow and the town of Drogheda. On 19 May 1921 its name was changed to the Grangegorman Mental Hospital. On 17 April 1958 its name was changed to St. Brendan's Hospital, which it retains to this day.

Although the original building of the Richmond Lunatic Asylum has now been largely destroyed, a new state of the art "Phoenix Care Centre", comprising 54 bedrooms and ensuites, recreational rooms, clinical rooms, administration areas, seclusion rooms and therapy gardens, opened in March 2013.
