= Conolly Norman =

Irish psychiatrist

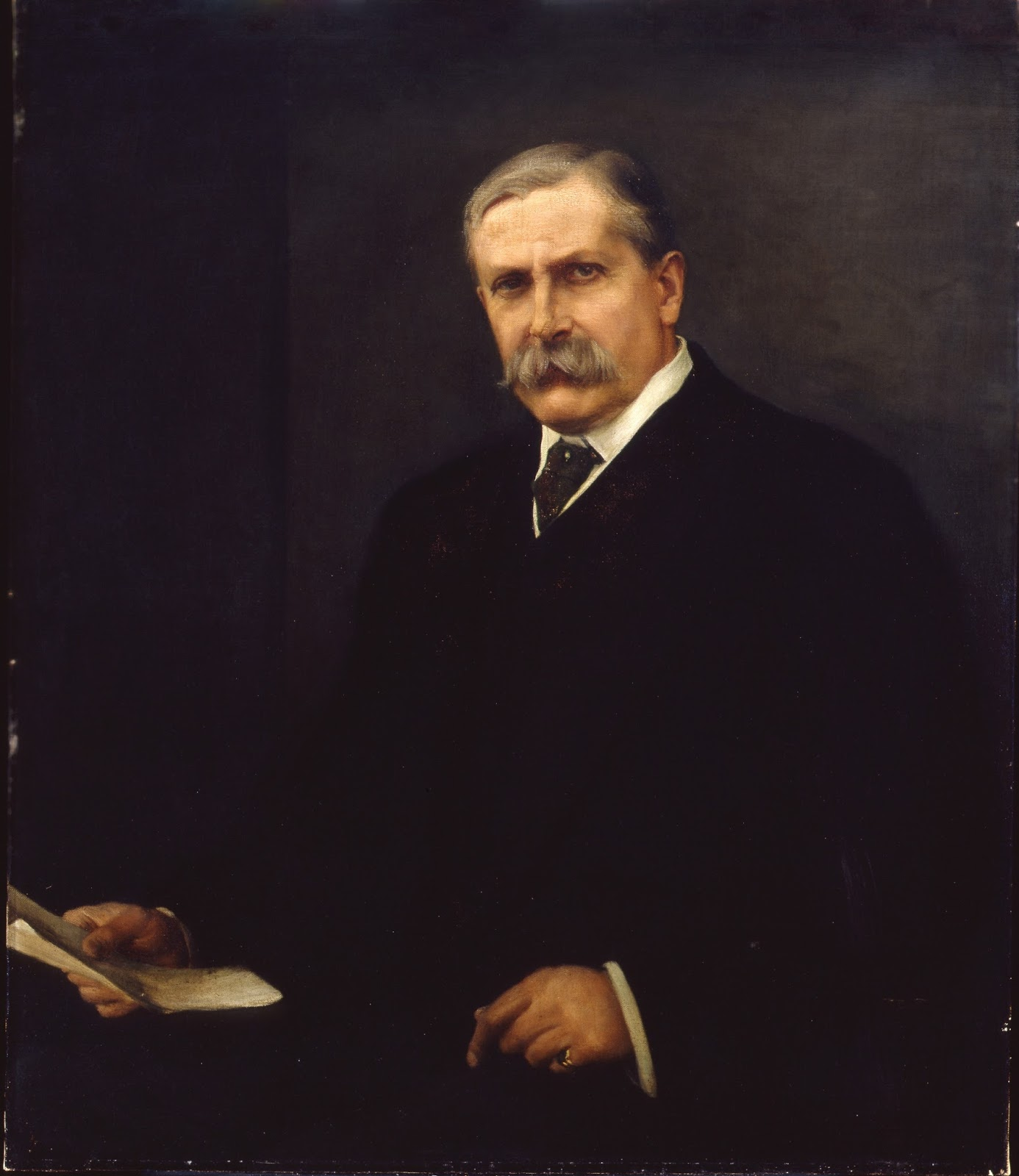
Conolly Norman

Conolly Norman (12 March 1853 – 23 February 1908) was an Irish alienist, or psychiatrist, of the late nineteenth and early twentieth centuries. He was the Resident Medical Superintendent of a number of district asylums, most notably Ireland's largest asylum, the Richmond District Lunatic Asylum, now known as St. Brendan's Hospital.

That fellow I was in the Ship with last night, said Buck Mulligan, says you have g.p.i. He's up in Dottyville with Conolly Norman. General Paralysis of the Insane.

— James Joyce, Ulysses

== Early life ==
Norman was born on 12 March 1853 at All Saints' Glebe, Newtown Cunningham, County Donegal, Ireland. The fifth child of six boys, his father, Hugh Norman, was the rector of All Saints' and later of Barnhill. His family were prominent and politically active in Derry with several members serving as mayor of Derry. Two members of his family were also elected to parliament.

== Medical education ==
Educated at home due to his fragile health as a child, at the age of seventeen Norman began his medical studies at Trinity College, Dublin, the Carmichael Medical School, and the Richmond Surgical Hospital, gaining a M.D. In 1874 he became a licentiate of the Royal College of Physicians and Surgeons, a fellow of the Royal College of Surgeons in 1878 and a fellow of the Royal College of Physicians in 1890.

== Early career ==
After he graduated in 1874, Norman immediately took up a post as an assistant medical officer in the Monaghan District Lunatic Asylum. He remained in that post until 1880 when he joined the staff of the Bethlem Royal Hospital in London where he worked under the prominent English alienist Sir George Savage. Returning to Ireland in 1882 he was appointed the Resident Medical Superintendent of Castlebar District Lunatic Asylum in Co. Mayo. He remained there until 1885 when he was appointed Resident Medical Superintendent of the Monaghan Asylum. In 1886, he was appointed by the Lord Lieutenant as Resident Medical Superintendent to Ireland's largest asylum, the Richmond District Lunatic Asylum. He would remain in this last post until his death in 1908 at the age of fifty-five.

== Richmond District Lunatic Asylum ==
While the Richmond asylum prior to Norman's arrival has been described as primitive and prisonlike this is perhaps to overlook the international praise that his predecessor, John Lalor had received, particularly in regard to his educational initiatives in establishing a national school for the patients in the grounds of the hospital. In any case, by 1904, Connolly could assert like a growing number of reforming alienists, that Emil Kraepelin's dementia praecox (a concept intimately linked with schizophrenia) was not incurable.

== Publications ==
- (1885). 'On Insanity Alternating with Spasmodic Asthma'. Journal of Mental Science. 31: 1–12.
- (1886). 'Some Points in Irish Lunacy Law'. Journal of Mental Science. 31: 459–67.
- (1886). 'Two Cases of Larvated Insanity'. Journal of Mental Science. 32: 36–44.
- (1887). 'Cases Illustrating the Sedative Effects of Aceto-phenone (hypnone)'. Journal of Mental Science. 32: 519–25.
- (1887). 'Variations in form of mental affections in relation to the classification of insanity'. The Dublin Journal of Medical Science. 83: 228–35.
- (1888). 'A Rare Form of Mental Disease (Grübelsucht)'. Journal of Mental Science. 34: 400–08.
- (1889). 'On Sulphonal'. The Dublin Journal of Medical Science. 87: 19–27.
- (1890). 'Acute confusional insanity'. The Dublin Journal of Medical Science. 89: 506–18.
- (1890). 'Case of Intracranial Tumour'. Journal of Mental Science. 36: 361–67.
- (1892). 'A Note on Cocainism'. Journal of Mental Science. 38: 195–99.
- (1894). 'Presidential Address (Medico-Psychological Association), delivered at the Royal College of Physicians, Dublin, 12 June 1894'. Journal of Mental Science. 40: 487–99.
- (1894). 'A Case of Porencephaly'. Journal of Mental Science 40: 649–65.
- (1896). 'The domestic treatment of the insane'. The Dublin Journal of Medical Science. 101: 111–21.
- (1899). 'Considerations on the Mental State in Aphasia'. Journal of Mental Science.45: 326–37.
- (1899). 'A Brief Note on Beri-beri in Asylums'. Journal of Mental Science. 45: 503–12.
- (1899). 'Emphysema of the Subcutaneous Areolar Tissue Occurring in a Case of Acute Mania'. Journal of Mental Science. 45: 749–58.
- (1899). 'Reports on the Progress of Neurology and Psychiatry'. The Dublin Journal of Medical Science. 107: 209–21.
- (1900). 'The Clinical Features of Beri-Beri'. The Dublin Journal of Medical Science. 109(337): 1–16.
- (1900). 'Remarks on Senile Demenita'. The Dublin Journal of Medical Science. 110(346): 250–265.
- (1902). 'Notes on Hallucinations. I'. Journal of Mental Science. 48: 45–53.
- (1903). 'Notes on Hallucinations. II'. Journal of Mental Science. 49: 272–91.
- (1903). 'Notes on Hallucinations. III'. Journal of Mental Science. 49: 454–73.
- (1904). 'Gossip about Gheel'. Journal of Mental Science. 50: 53–64.
- (1904). 'Dementia Praecox'. The British Medical Journal. 2(2285): 972–76.
- (1904). 'On the Need for Family Care of Persons of Unsound Mind in Ireland'. Journal of Mental Science. 50: 461–73.
- (1905). 'Modern Witchcraft: a Study of a Phase of Paranoia'. Journal of Mental Science. (1905) 51: 116–25.
- (1905). 'The Family Care of the Insane'. Medical Press and Circular. 29 November – 6 December.
- (1906). 'Multiple Lipomata in General Paralysis'. Journal of Mental Science. 52: 62–9.

== See also ==
- St. Brendan's Hospital (Grangegorman)
