= Whitworth Hospital =

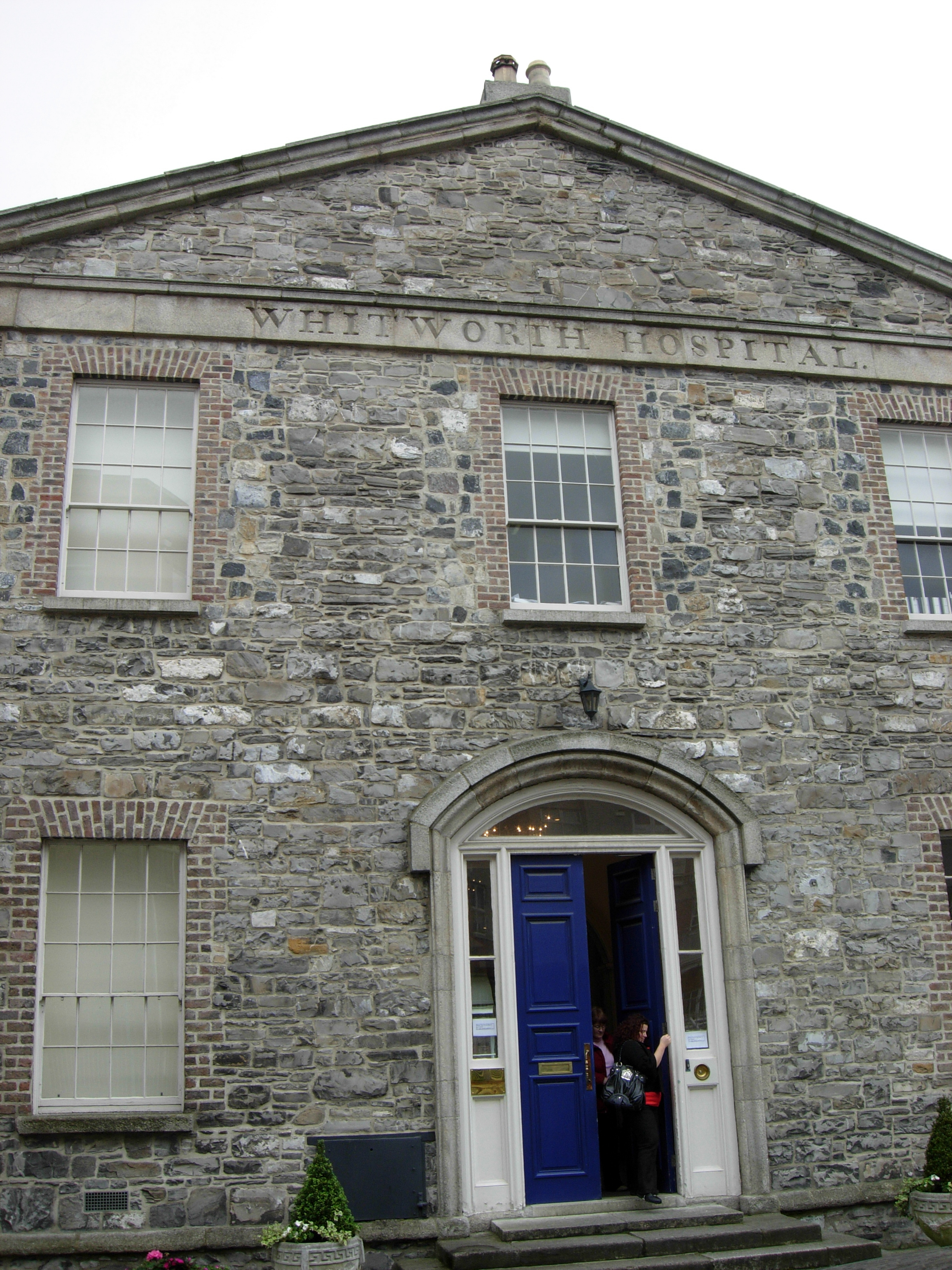
- Whitworth Hospital

- Shown in Dublin

Geography
- Location: Grangegorman, Dublin, Ireland
- Coordinates: 53.35158°N 6.27636°W

Organisation
- Type: General hospital

History
- Founded: 1816; 210 years ago
- Closed: 1987; 39 years ago

The Whitworth Hospital (Irish: Ospidéal Whitworth) was a general hospital on Morning Star Avenue in Grangegorman, Dublin, Ireland.

== History ==
The facility was designed as a hospital for chronic patients of the House of Industry. The new hospital, which was named after the Charles Whitworth, 1st Earl Whitworth, Lord Lieutenant of Ireland, opened in 1816. East and West wings, designed by Carroll & Batchelor, were added in 1900. It close temporarily in April 1849 on account of its high running costs but was re-opened a few months later by order of George Villiers, 4th Earl of Clarendon, the then Lord Lieutenant of Ireland. It closed permanently in November 1987. In 2002, the building was acquired by the Irish Nurses and Midwives Organisation, which has converted it for use as a meeting, training and study centre.

== Sources ==
- O'Brien, Eion; Browne, Lorna; O'Malley, Kevin (1988). The House of Industry Hospitals: The Richmond, Whitworth and Hardwicke (St Laurence's Hospital); A closing memoir. Anniversary Press. ISBN 978-1870940023.
