= House of Industry (Dublin) =

Workhouse in Dublin, Ireland

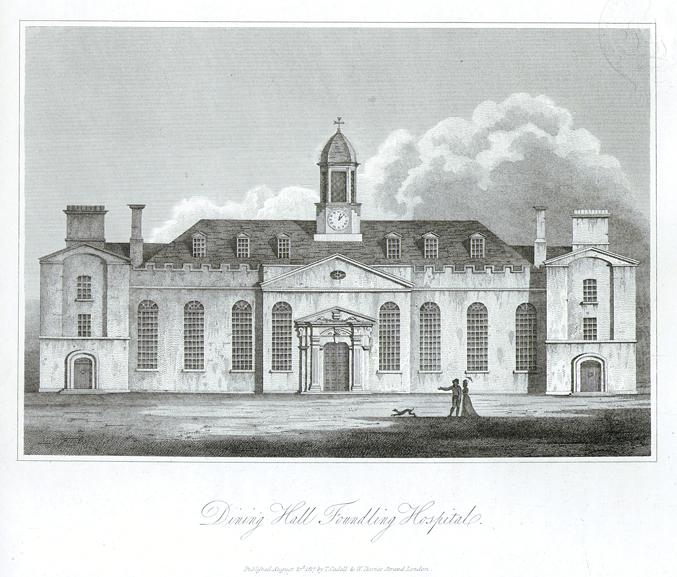
- Illustration of the dining hall of the foundling hospital which was constructed around 1704 and demolished in the second half of the 20th century.
- Interactive map of the House of Industry area
- Former names: South Dublin Union
- Alternative names: City Workhouse

General information
- Type: Hospital and workhouse
- Architectural style: Georgian, Classical
- Location: James's Street, Dublin, Ireland
- Coordinates: 53.341902°N 6.294277°W
- Construction started: 12 October 1704

Technical details
- Material: limestone

Design and construction
- Architects: Thomas Burgh (1704); Francis Johnston (1798-1804); George Wilkinson (1840)

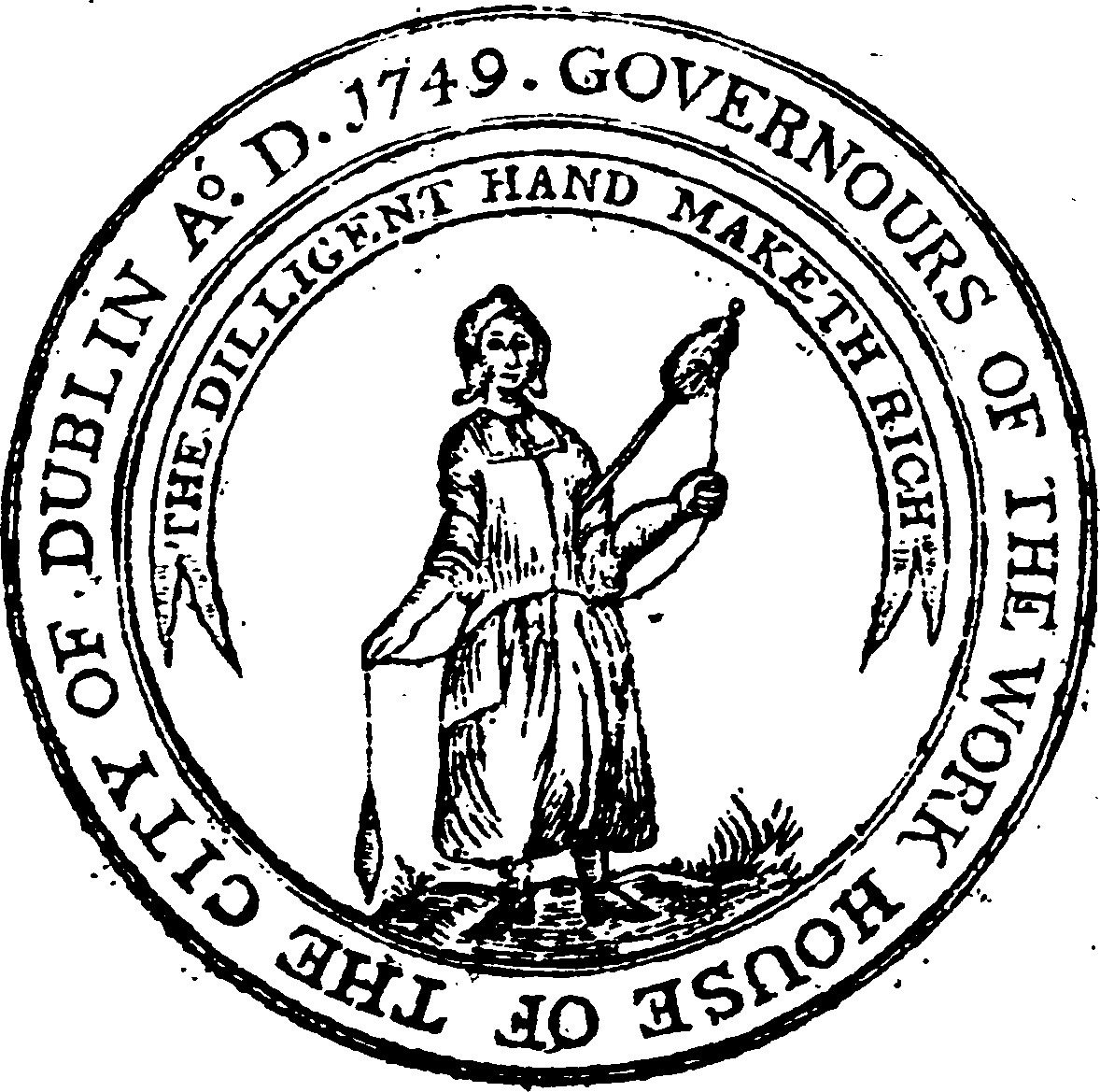
Etching from 1749.

The House of Industry was a workhouse in Dublin, Ireland which existed from its establishment by an act of Parliament in 1703, "for the employment and maintaining the poor thereof".

From 1729 the House of Industry also incorporated the foundling hospital.

== History ==
Dublin Workhouse Act 1703
- Act of Parliament
- Parliament of Ireland
- Long title: An Act for erecting a Workhouse in the City of Dublin.
- Citation: 2 Anne c. 19 (I)
- Territorial extent: Ireland

Dates
- Royal assent: 4 March 1704
- Commencement: 1 May 1704 (Note: Section 1.)

Text of statute as originally enacted

The foundation stone of the hospital was recorded as having been laid by the Duchess of Ormond on the 12th of October 1704 following it being established by the Dublin Workhouse Act 1703 (2 Anne c. 19 (I)).

It was located at the present site of St. James's Hospital, James's Street and adjacent to the City Basin and included 14 acres (57,000 m^{2}) of land. The upkeep of this institution was paid for through taxes levied on sedan chairs, hackney coaches and a House Tax applied throughout the city. After the tax was lifted on 5 January 1823, the workhouse was mainly supported through grants from the Irish Parliament.

In 1796 it accommodated more than 1,700 people. Following an act of the Irish Parliament, responsibility for its management was assumed by seven governors, elected annually by, and out of, the members of Dublin Corporation. At about this time, a number of mechanical innovations by Benjamin Thompson were incorporated into the building for improved ventilation, cooking and heating.

It is to be observed, that this institution differs very materially from any poorhouse, or other institution, in Great Britain, both in its object, its government, and its resources. In Ireland, there are no poor laws, or local taxes, for the support of the poor. This institution was provided for the purpose of providing employment, and for the maintenance of the poor of Dublin, and for the punishment of the vagrants and beggars who infested the streets of that city. _{Observations of Thomas Bernard 1799 p156}

The House of Industry offered housing for beggars, vagabonds, deserted children under the age of eight, and the mentally insane. In 1773, the workhouse was reformed and split into a hospital for the mentally insane, a workhouse for the poor, and a foundling hospital primarily for the safety and education of the admitted children. This foundling hospital took in deserted infants in Dublin, but owing to its abnormally high mortality rates (four out of five) it came under scrutiny and investigation. These investigations found strong evidence of malpractice directly responsible for the death of thousands of children. The House of Commons stopped allowing new admissions to the hospital in 1831.

The workhouse where vagabonds and beggars were sent fell under similar scrutiny. In 1805 Sir John Carr in his Tour of Ireland described the workhouse as "A gloomy abode of mingled want, disease, vice and malady, where lunatics were loaded with heavy chains and fallen women bound and logged"; and Parliament believed the House of Industry was a failure and "completely worthless". Described as 'the Dublin Poor House', it was also visited by the French political theorist Alexis de Tocqueville in 1835, during his investigative tour of Ireland. Tocqueville described the conditions of the inmates there as "the most hideous and disgusting aspect of destitution". The food provided was soup rendered from left-overs collected in a wheelbarrow from the wealthy.

With the passage of the Irish Poor Law in 1838, the House of Industry on James's Street became the South Dublin Union.

== House of Industry, Channel Row ==
Another House of Industry was founded in 1773 in an old malt house on Channel Row, modern-day North Brunswick Street, on the north side of the city, in what is today called Grangegorman close to what was later to become the Royal Canal Harbour.

In 1838, with the passage of the Irish Poor Law, it became known as the North Dublin Union. In 1919, it was amalgamated into the South Dublin Workhouse and the old North Dublin buildings were repurposed for military use. It was from then on simply named the Dublin Union.

== See also ==
- Irish Poor Laws
- Mendicity Institution
- House of industry

== Sources ==
- Chapter X from Life in old Dublin by James Collins 1913
