= Richmond General Penitentiary =

Former prison in Dublin, Ireland

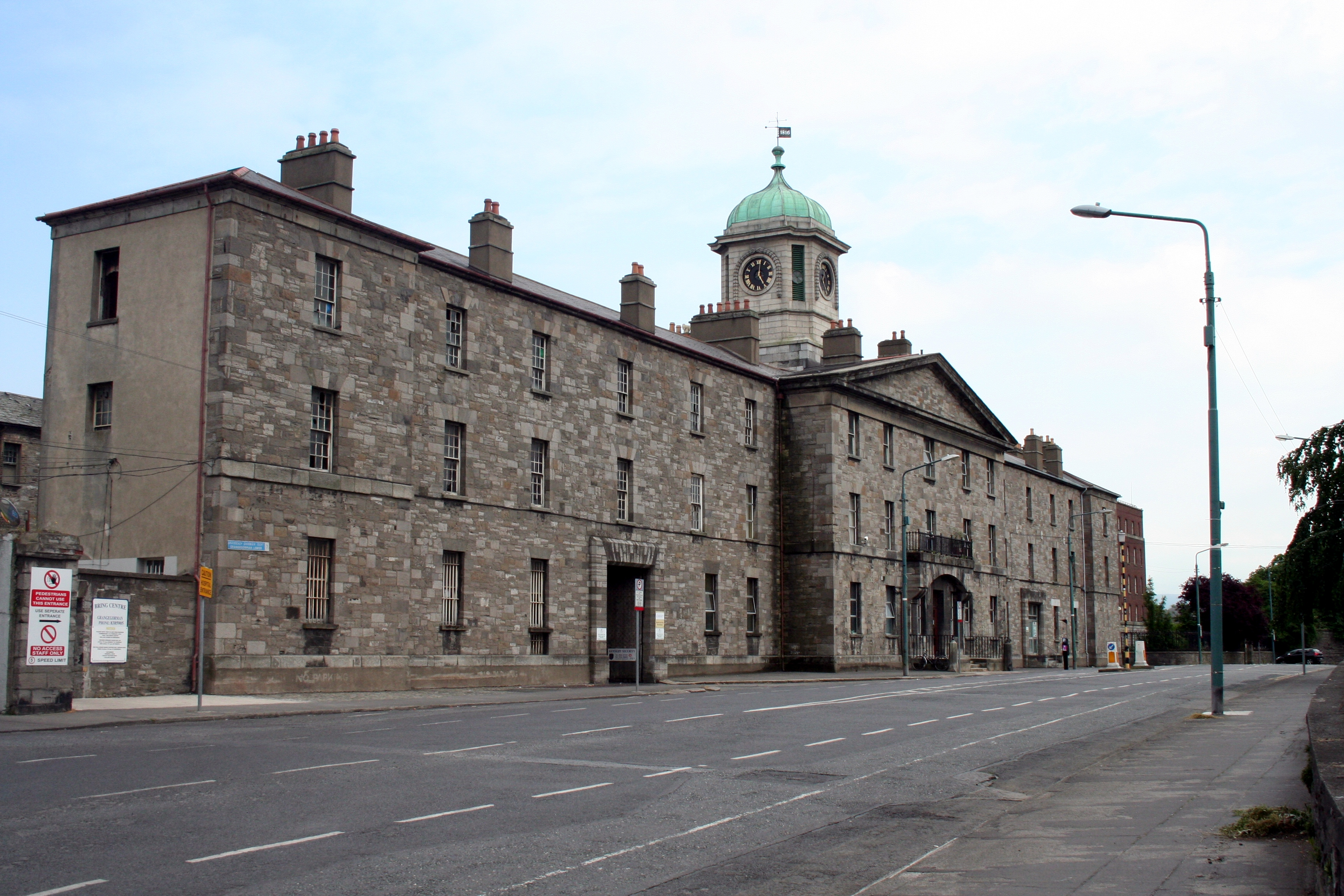
- This is the Richmond General Penitentiary as it exists today

- Location within Dublin
- Location: Grangegorman, Dublin 7; 53°21′16.97″N 6°16′41.22″W
- Status: Currently in use as the offices of the Grangegorman Development Agency (http://ggda.ie/) and DIT Campus Planning
- Opened: 1820
- Closed: 1831

The Richmond General Penitentiary was a prison established in 1820 in Grangegorman, Dublin, Ireland as an alternative to transportation. It was part of an experiment into a penitentiary system which also involved Millbank Penitentiary, London. Richmond and Millbank penitentiaries were the first prisons in the United Kingdom of Great Britain and Ireland to specialise in reform rather than punishment. The building was designed by the architect Francis Johnston and decorated by George Stapleton. The building ceased to be a penitentiary in 1831, and later became part of the Richmond Asylum.

== Origins ==
In 1810, the Governors of the House Industry situated on North Brunswick Street were instructed by the Lord Lieutenant of Ireland to purchase land for the construction of a penitentiary. The purpose of the penitentiary was to provide a custodial and rehabilitative alternative to the transportation of prisoners to Botany Bay, Australia. It was hoped that through solitary confinement, hard labour and religious instruction that prisoners might be reformed. They obtained a three half acre site from Lord Monck in Grangegorman which was at that time planted with apple and pear trees. Given that the Governors already had responsibility for the management of several prisons, including the Female penitentiary in Kilmainham, the House of Correction, Smithfield, the penitentiary in James's Street and a prison ward in the House of Industry, they were assigned the task of overseeing the building of the institution that would be known as the Richmond General Penitentiary. The architect appointed was Francis Johnston. The building was completed in 1816, but it served as a fever hospital in that year and was subsequently completely refurbished. It received its first prisoners in 1820.

== Design ==
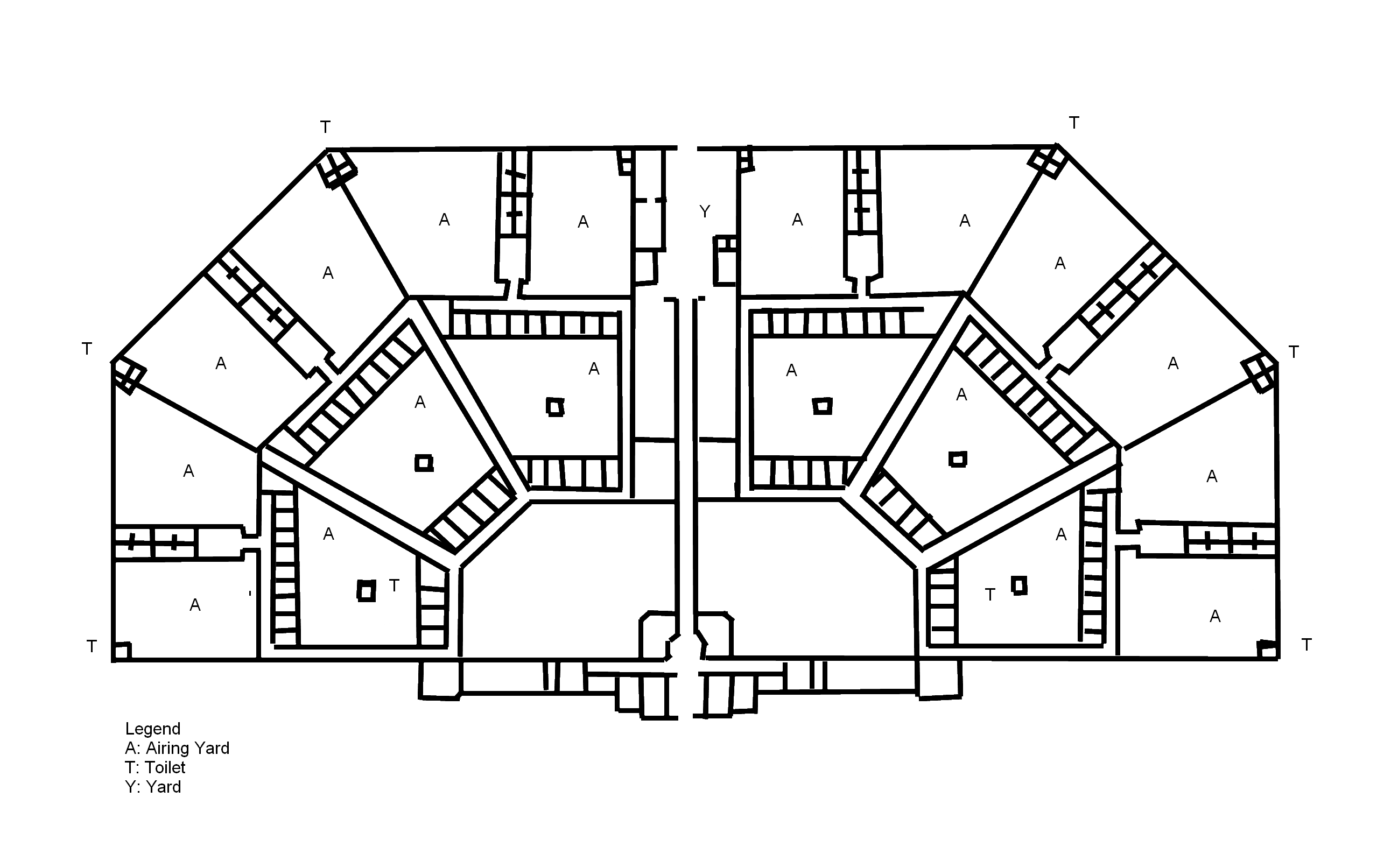
Architectural drawing of the Richmond General Penitentiary by Francis Johnston (1811)

Architecturally this "brooding" and "dour" building has been described as realising "as bald an expression of the late Georgian penal code as one is likely to get". Sited close to the House of Industry, the forbidding frontage of the penitentiary, which consisted of one central block featuring a clock-tower with two wings either side in which were placed massive entry gates, originally extended 700 feet along Grangegorman Lane. According to one contemporary commentator the exterior of the building was "imposing" and "calculated to produce in the mind of the approaching criminal, an impression of hopeless incarceration, and compel him to resign at once every idea of liberty, unless deserved by a reform of conduct."

Following concepts of prison design that had become popular with progressive architects since the 1770s, the penitentiary employed a complex radial design consisting of a semi-octagonal shape divided down the middle by a long central corridor which was flanked by kitchens, shops, chapels, and yards, and extended from the front to the rear of the building. This central corridor divided the penitentiary into male and female sides. Each half was also subdivided into three individual wedge-shaped compartments divided from each other by radiating corridors and walls. Each of these segments were also divided by transverse walls and corridors the first section of which contained workshops and then cells surrounding an exercise yard. The large outer exercise yard was bisected by a central radiating structure running to the rear perimeter wall which contained solitary cells and infirmaries. According to Markus Reuber this standard penitentiary design, conceived of as an architectural technology to achieve the reform of the prisoner, sought to incorporate monastic principles of seclusion, solitude, silence and work into the spatial organisation of the prison.

== Reforming the Prisoner ==
Upon committal prisoners were placed in solitary confinement in cells towards the rear of the building and, if their behaviour was seen to warrant it, after a period of at least one week they were removed to cells closer to the front of the building where they were allowed a greater degree of interaction with the other inmates.

== Proselytism Scandal ==
The prison's officers were accused of proselytism and cruelty, and the British administration in Ireland ordered a commission of inquiry to investigate the accusations.

== Transfer to Richmond District Asylum ==
The penitentiary was used as a transportation depot to Van Diemen's Land (now Tasmania) between 1840 and the 1880s. Over 3,200 women and children passed through the Grangegorman Transportation Depot as it was then known, before being sent on ships to Hobart, Tasmania. This was the largest number of transportees of any place in Ireland at the time. The Cascades Female Factory in Hobart where these women ended up is now a UNESCO World Heritage Site. In 1897 ownership of the building was transferred to the Richmond District Lunatic Asylum and it was thereafter referred to as the "annexe" and used to house patients and for administrative functions. The building now referred to as 'The Clock Tower' is used as offices for Technological University of Dublin and the Grangegorman Development Agency. It forms part of the new TU Dublin campus being developed on the former hospital grounds.

== See also ==
- Prisons in Ireland
