= Grangegorman =

Inner northern suburb of Dublin, Ireland

Grangegorman Gráinseach Ghormáin (Irish)
- Inner suburb
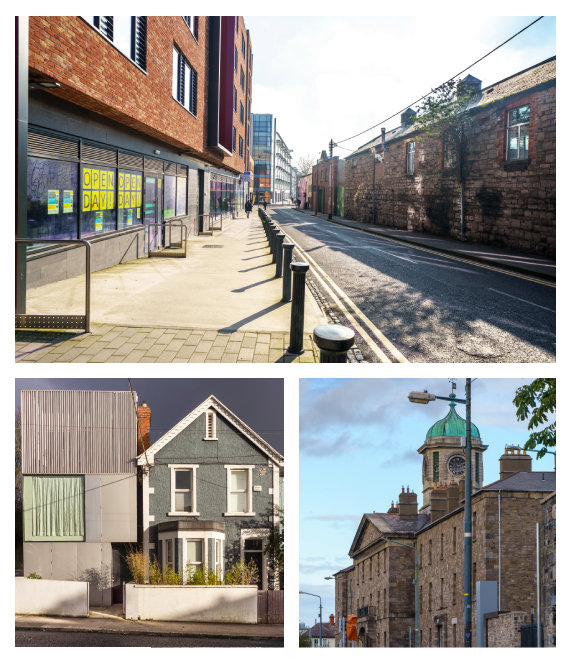
- Clockwise from top: Lower Grangegorman Road, Grangegorman Clocktower, new and old houses in Grangegorman

- Location in Dublin
- Coordinates: 53°21′17″N 6°16′41″W
- Country: Ireland
- Province: Leinster
- County: Dublin

Government
  - Dáil Éireann: Dublin Central
  - EU Parliament: Dublin

Area
  - Inner suburb: 0.72 km^{2} (0.28 sq mi)
- Elevation: 23 m (75 ft)

Population (2006)
  - Urban: 3,692
- Time zone: UTC+0 (WET)
  - Summer (DST): UTC-1 (IST (WEST))
- Eircode routing key: D07
- Irish Grid Reference: O146353

Location of
Dublin Institute of Technology
campus at Grangegorman in central Dublin

Grangegorman (Irish: Gráinseach Ghormáin) is an inner suburb of Dublin, Ireland. The area is administered by Dublin City Council. It was best known for decades as the location of St Brendan's Hospital, which was the main psychiatric hospital serving the greater Dublin region. As of 2020, the area is the subject of a major redevelopment plan, running for more than a decade, under the aegis of the Grangegorman Development Agency, including the new Technological University Dublin campus.

Grangegorman is also the name of a civil parish in the historical baronies of Dublin City and Coolock.

== Etymology ==
The name Grangegorman, as with other placenames containing the name "Gorman" in the Leinster region, probably indicates that at one time this territory was held by the Uí Bairrche, an Irish clan based in Leinster. The two main representatives of this clan were Uí Treasaig (Tracey) and Mac Gormáin (MacGorman). They were displaced following the Norman invasion of Ireland from the twelfth century.

== Location ==
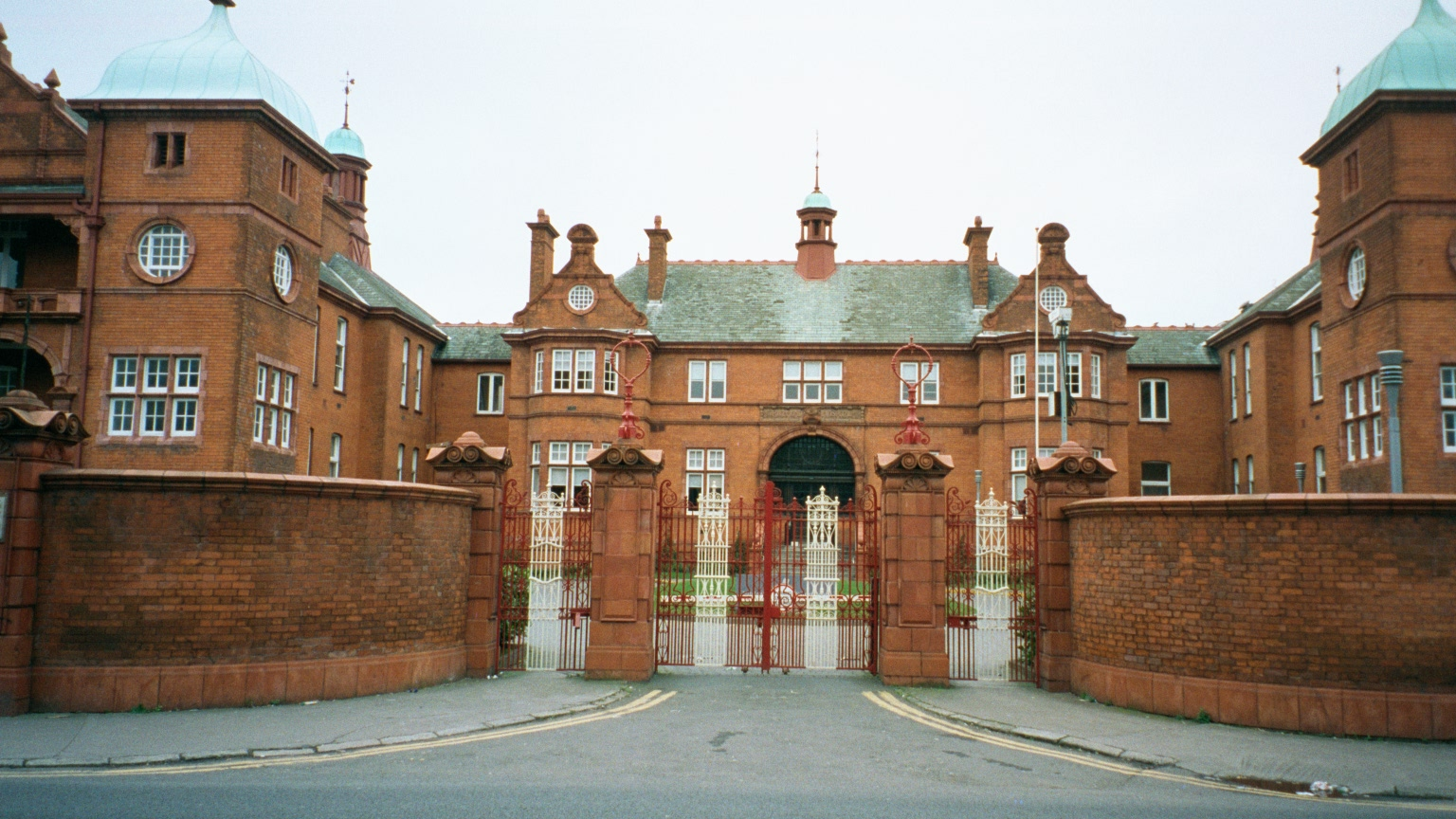
The Richmond Surgical Hospital, rebuilt in 1900. Situated on North Brunswick Street, it now forms part of the Dublin operations of the Court Service.

Grangegorman has evolved over time to its current boundaries, which, like those of most Dublin suburbs, are imprecise, while for the purposes of redevelopment, an extended "neighbourhood" was defined. A major historic feature was the Bradogue River, now culverted but still cutting right through the area on its way to the River Liffey.

=== Modern suburb of Grangegorman ===
Grangegorman is located in the Dublin 7 postal district, north of the River Liffey and about 1 km from Dublin city centre and its boundaries run, approximately, along North Brunswick Street, Prussia Street and Manor Street, the North Circular Road and Phibsborough Road and Constitution Hill. Grangegorman is surrounded to the south-east by Smithfield to the west by Stoneybatter, north by Cabra, to the north and east by Phibsborough / Broadstone.

The geographical definition of the north Dublin electoral division known as Arran Quay B, encompasses Grangegorman. The 2006 Census gives the population of Arran Quay B as 3,692. This represents a 19.5 per cent increase from the population of the area in 2002.

=== Historical civil parishes of Grangegorman ===
There are five civil parishes in the area of Grangegorman: Grangegorman North, South, East, West and Middle. Bordered by the parishes of Castleknock, Finglas, Glasnevin, St. George's, St. Paul's and St. Michan's it encompassed the localities of Broadstone, Cabra, Phibsborough and the northern half of Stoneybatter .

The census data of 1901 records a population of 14,970 in the civil parish of Grangegorman while that for 1971, the last year for which there is any data, records a population of 32,105, equalling a 114.5 per cent increase between these dates.

=== The Neighbourhood of Grangegorman ===
The 'Neighbourhood of Grangegorman' is defined by Irish statute, the Grangegorman Development Agency Act (2005). Schedule 2, section 4 of this act defines the 'Neighbourhood of Grangegorman' as consisting of the electoral divisions of Arran Quay A, Arran Quay B, Arran Quay C, Arran Quay D, Arran Quay E, Inns Quay B, Inns Quay C and Cabra East C. Essentially, this act, for the purposes of the statutory body of the Grangegorman Development Agency, extends the spatial definition of Grangegorman as far south as the River Liffey, and encompasses parts of east Cabra, Phibsborough, Broadstone and Stoneybatter.

According to this definition the population of the 'Neighbourhood of Grangegorman' was equal to 24,534 in 2006.

== History ==
Along with Stoneybatter and Glassmanogue, Grangegorman was recorded in 1610 as one of only three remote villages in this region and at that stage, lying north of Ostman town and north of the River Liffey, they were not joined to the city of Dublin.

In 1828 All Saints Church, Grangegorman was built to serve the new Church of Ireland parish of Grangegorman formed in 1830 was formed out of parts of the parishes of St. Michan, St. Paul, and St. George.

The Rev. William Basil Kingsbury Maturin (1803–1887), a Tractarian, was the Church of Ireland perpetual curate of Grangegorman and also librarian of Archbishop Marsh's Library, Dublin, from 1872 until 1887.

=== The Dean's Orchard ===
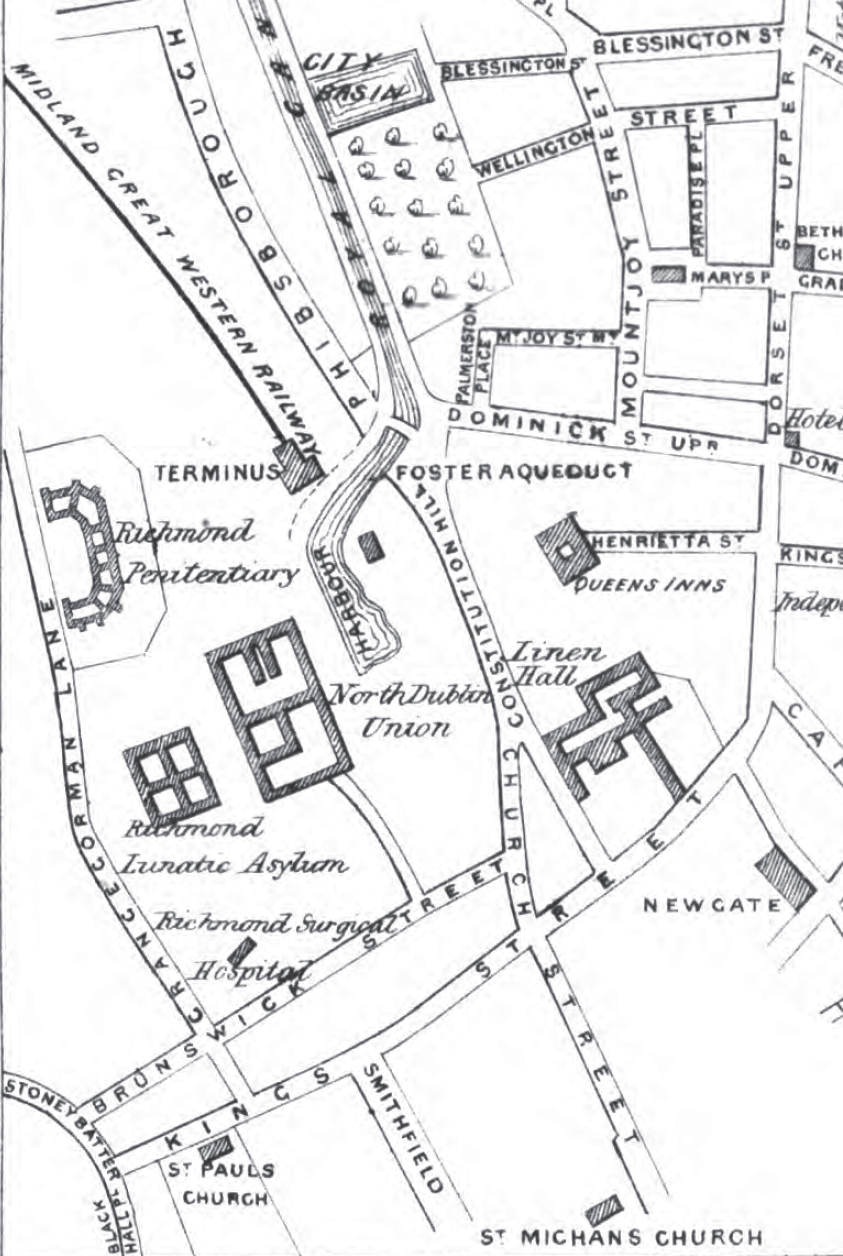
Map (1862) showing the northwest of Dublin including the eastern half of the region of Grangegorman.

In the fourteenth-century Dublin was a small walled city with perhaps 10,000 inhabitants. At this time Grangegorman functioned as one of three home farms, the others being Glasnevin and Clonken or Clonkene (now known as Deansgrange), which served to meet the expenditure of the Prior of the Augustinian Priory at The Church of the Holy Trinity. The Canons of this priory served The Church of the Holy Trinity, which was the State Church until the dissolution of the monasteries in the sixteenth century when it was re-established as Christ Church Cathedral. The farm buildings at Grangegorman consisted of one large hall with some rooms attached and an enclosed farmyard around which there stood a barn, a malthouse, a workshop and a haggard (a farm enclosure for stacking grain or hay, etc.). All of these buildings had thatched roofs. The Manor of Grangegorman was located in the north end of Stoneybatter in present-day Manor Street. It is from this association that Manor Street derives its name. The poorly paid farm labourers of Grangegorman farm lived in cottages near the manor.

The territory of Grangegorman has had a long association with orchards which only passed into history in the mid-nineteenth century. The lease of Grangegorman dated 1485 refers to its lands as "the Orchard". With the dissolution of the monasteries, King Henry VIII on 10 May 1541 by letters patent authorised the transformation of the Prior and Canons of Christ Church to a Dean and Chapter. The lease granted that same year refers to "the Great Orchard" and in 1542 to "an orchard belonging to the Dean situate beyond the town of Oxmantown Green". In 1560 the lease simply referred to "the Dean's Orchard".

The possession of the Manor of Grangegorman passed into the hands of Rt. Hon. Francis Agard after the formation of dean and chapter for the management of Christ Church Cathedral. Following Agard's death in 1577, this possession passed to the control of his son-in-law, Sir Henry Harrington. In the period after the Restoration, the residential expanse of Grangegorman consisted of forty houses. The Manor House at this time was held by Sir Thomas Stanley. It is assumed that the domicile to which the now defunct Stanley Street once led was the manorial house. This site is currently occupied by the Stanhope Street Convent of the Irish Sisters of Charity. In 1674 the Manor of Grangegorman was held by Sir John Stanley (the son of the previous owner). In the early eighteenth century it passed to Charles Monck who was Stanley's nephew and an ancestor of Viscount Monck, the Earl of Rathdowne who was the landlord holding most of the property in the area.

=== The House of Industry ===
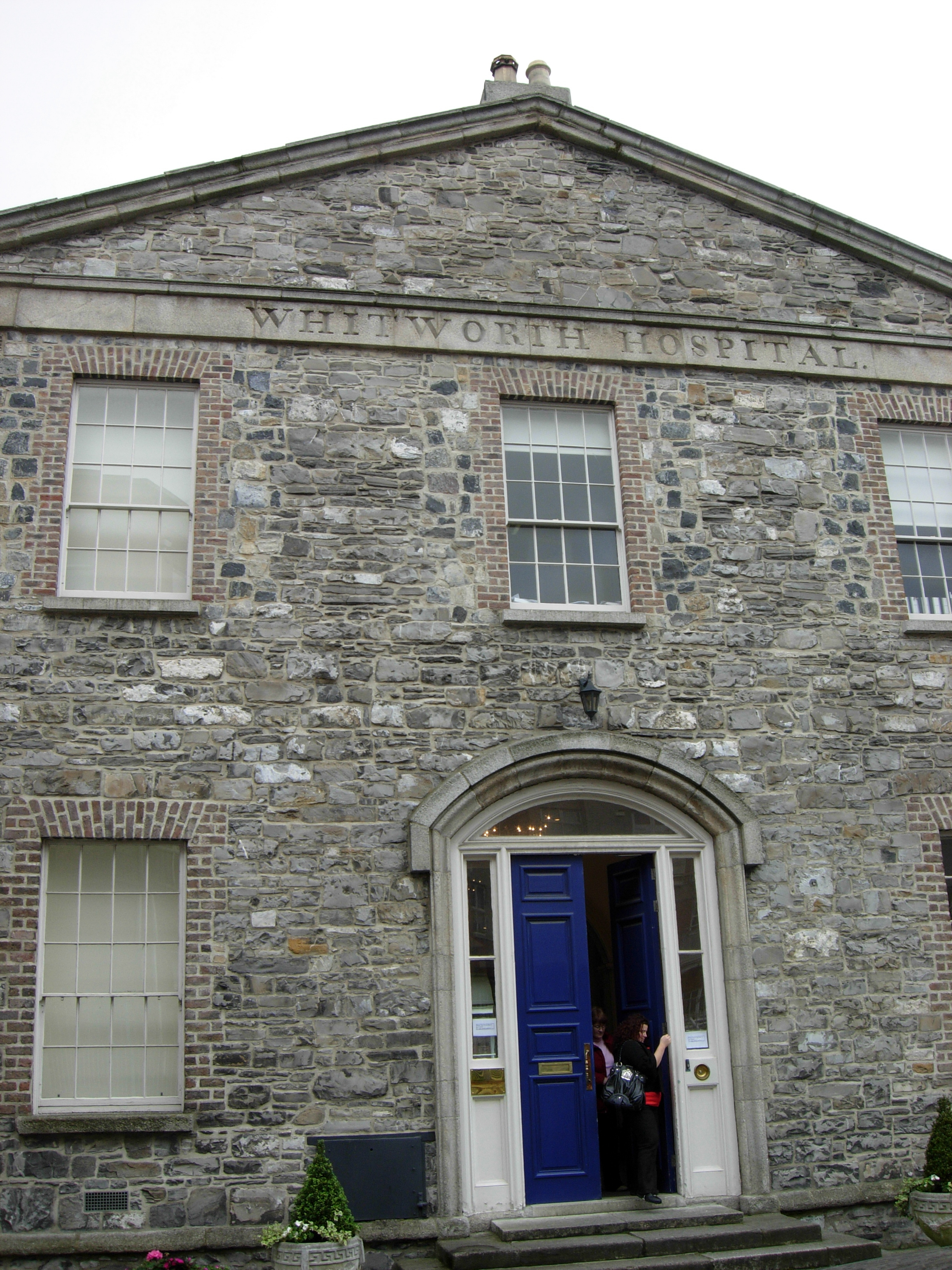
The Whitworth Hospital (1814), located off Morning Star Avenue.

From the eighteenth century onwards, Grangegorman was to be transformed from an agricultural hamlet to an urban centre dominated by penal and welfare institutions. In 1704 Dublin's first House of Industry was established on St. James's Street south of the River Liffey, on the site currently occupied by St. James's Hospital. However, in 1729 this institution was enlarged to include the notorious Dublin Foundling Hospital. In 1771–72 a philanthropic body called "The Corporation for the Relief of the Poor" was instituted following the passage of permissive legislation and this entity was responsible for the opening in 1773 of Dublin's second House of Industry which was situated at the site of the derelict malthouse on Channel Row on what is now North Brunswick Street. Channel Row at this time was considered to form part of the locality of Glassmanogue to which also belonged the area known as Broadstone. The establishment of this institution was to be the single most important factor in shaping the urban character of Grangegorman as a site increasingly predominated by the presence of a range of institutions meeting nineteenth-century expectations of philanthropy, care and social control.

The decision to site the House of Industry in this part of the city no doubt reflected the fact that the local population in Grangegorman and the surrounding districts of the northwest of Dublin were and are overwhelming proletarian in nature. Indeed, this reflects a long-standing east–west divide in the city, which continues into the present day. In the parishes of St. Paul's and St. Michan's, resting on either side of Smithfield in the northwest, between 76 per cent and 79 per cent of the population were considered working class in 1797. Conversely, in the parishes of St. Thomas and St. George in the northeast of the city, the percentage of the population which was working class was 45 per cent and 31 per cent respectively. A degree of elite distaste toward the behaviour of working-class populations is revealed in the visitation report of an episcopalian archbishop to the region of Grangegorman-Glassmanogue in 1727 when he described the local population, who lacked a church at this point, as lewd and unruly.

In 1787 the governors of the House of Industry considered the need for new accommodation to provide facilities for some two thousand inmates. The old malt house was in a ruinous condition and by the 1790s was deemed in danger of collapse. In September 1791 work began on the New House of Industry at a plot adjoining and to the north of the original building. The site of this building, now demolished, was located at the end of Morning Star Avenue. In 1798 the governors of the House of Industry petitioned the Irish House of Commons to build a proper infirmary. Work on this, the Hardwicke Fever Hospital, began in 1803. To cope with the increasing number of children in the workhouse, the Bedford Asylum for Industrious Children, named after the then Lord Lieutenant and the Duke of Bedford and designed by the noted architect, Francis Johnston to accommodate one thousand children, was constructed in 1806 on a site on North Brunswick Street. To care for the 'ruptured poor', the Richmond Surgical Hospital was opened in 1810. The building used for this hospital had been a convent constructed in 1688 by the Benedictine Nuns in Channel Row, opposite Red Cow Lane. Subsequently, it passed into the possession of the Dominican Nuns who largely rebuilt the structure. The hospital was subsequently rebuilt in 1900 in distinctive red brick. This building still stands and from 1996 to 2013 functioned as the Dublin Metropolitan Court before being purchased by the Irish Nurses and Midwives Organisation, which after extensive renovations reopened the building on 20 April 2018 (117 years to the day since the building was originally opened) as an education and events centre. In 1814 the Whitworth Hospital for chronic patients was built on a site just to the south of the new House of Industry. On 24 April 1820, the Talbot dispensary was opened and attached to the Richmond Surgical Hospital to afford relief to those among the sick poor who were not considered suitable for hospital accommodation and were resident in the north-west district of Dublin.

=== Richmond General Penitentiary ===
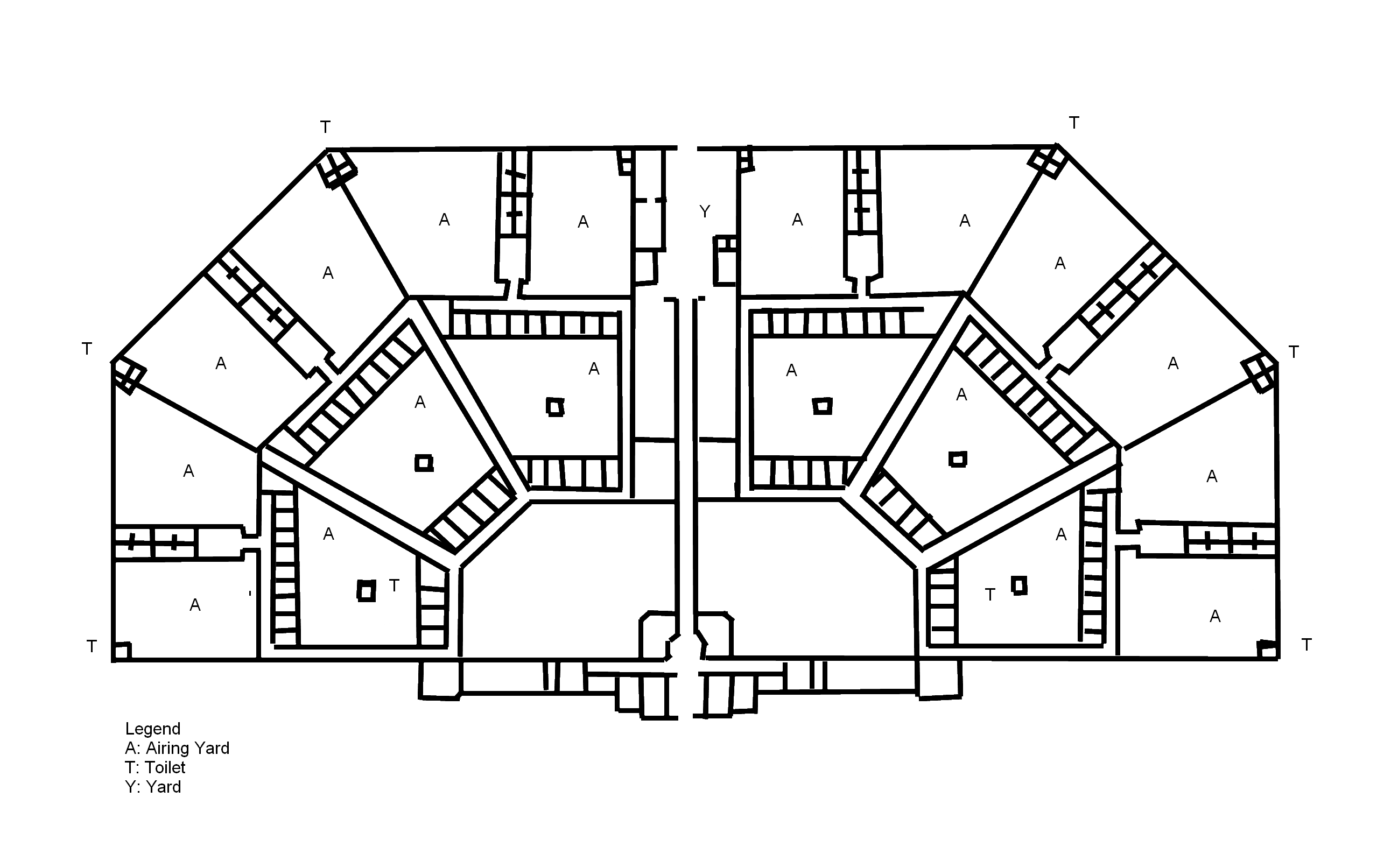
Architectural drawing of the Richmond General Penitentiary by Francis Johnston (1811)

In 1810, the governors of the House Industry were instructed by the lord lieutenant to purchase land for the construction of a penitentiary. They obtained a 3 1/2-acre site from Lord Monck in Grangegorman which was at that time planted with apple and pear trees. They were assigned the task of overseeing the building of the institution that would be known as the Richmond General Penitentiary. The architect appointed was Francis Johnston. The building was completed in 1816. It received its first prisoners in 1820.

=== Richmond District Asylum ===
At the beginning of the nineteenth century, there was minimal specialist institutional provision for those deemed insane in Ireland. The lunatic department of the House of Industry, which in 1809 had forty-six cells reserved for this population, was heavily over-subscribed as individuals were sent there from throughout Ireland. Therefore, the governors of the House of Industry petitioned the British parliament for funds to construct additional buildings to meet this demand. The government agreed to fund the construction of an asylum and at the cost of £2,000 lands adjoining and to the east of the site of the House of Industry were purchased and an architect, Francis Johnston, was appointed. It officially opened as the Richmond Lunatic Asylum in 1815 with 250 beds, although it had received its first patients from the lunatic wards of the House of Industry in the previous year. It was named after Charles Lennox who was the Duke of Richmond and Lord Lieutenant of Ireland (1807–1813). Initially, it was established as a national asylum to receive curable lunatics from throughout the island of Ireland. From 1830, however, it was incorporated into the district asylum system. Thereafter it was renamed the Richmond District Lunatic Asylum and its catchment area was defined as the city and county of Dublin, the counties of Wicklow, Louth, Meath, and the town of Drogheda.

== See also ==
- St. Brendan's Hospital (Grangegorman)
- Richmond General Penitentiary
- Grangegorman Development Agency
- Grangegorman killings
- Grangegorman Military Cemetery which is located beside the Phoenix Park
- List of subdivisions of County Dublin
- Charles Monck, 1st Viscount Monck whose ancestors were from Grangegorman.

== Bibliography ==
- Central Statistics Office, Census of Population of Ireland 1971 Volume I: Population of District Electoral Divisions, Towns and Larger Units of Area (Dublin, July 1972).
- Central Statistics Office, Census 2006 Volume I: Population Defined by Area (Dublin, 2007).
- Cromwell, Thomas, Excursions through Ireland
- McGregor, John James, New Picture of Dublin(Dublin, 1821).
