= Stoneybatter =

Neighbourhood in northern inner-city Dublin, Ireland

Stoneybatter Bóthar na gCloch (Irish)
- Neighbourhood of Dublin
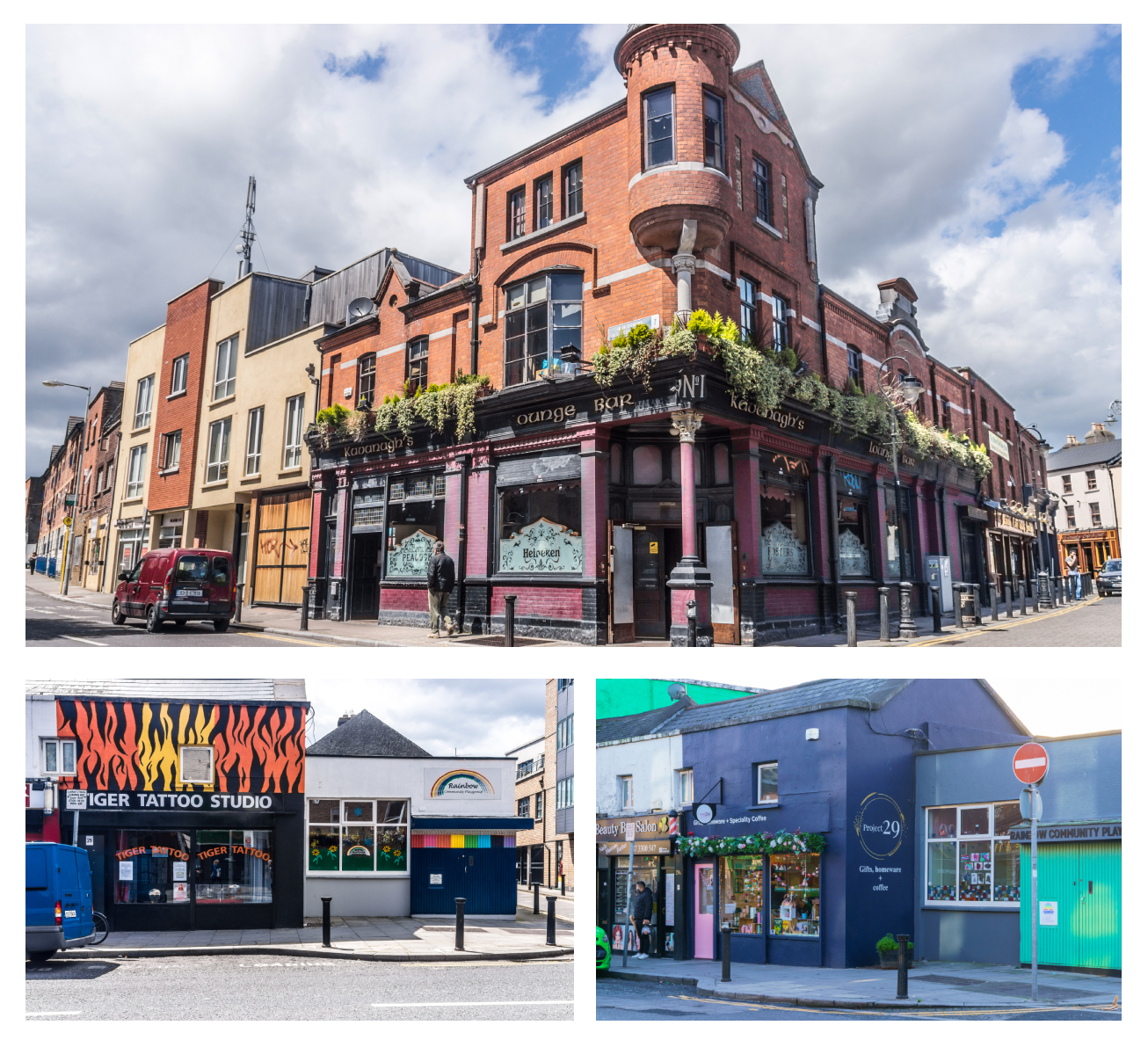
- Stoneybatter, Dublin

- Location in Dublin
- Country: Ireland
- County: Dublin
- City: Dublin
- Eircode routing key: D07

Stoneybatter (Irish: Bóthar na gCloch), is an inner-city neighbourhood of Dublin, Ireland, on the Northside of the city between the River Liffey, the North Circular Road, Smithfield Market, and Grangegorman. It is in the D7 postal district.

It is often referred to as Dublin's "hipster quarter", and was in Time Out's list of coolest neighbourhoods in the world in 2019.

== History ==
James Collins' 1913 book Life in Old Dublin notes that "Centuries ago (Stoneybatter) was called Bothar-na-gCloch". In Joyce's Irish names of places we find the following interesting information as to the original name of the place: "Long before the city had extended so far, and while Stoneybatter was nothing more than a country road, it was -- as it continues to be -- the great thoroughfare to Dublin from the districts lying west and north-west of the city; and it was known by the name of Bothar-na-gCloch (Bohernaglogh), i.e. the road of the stones, which was changed to the English equivalent, Stoneybatter or stony road".

In 1937 the Aughrim Street Scout Group was established, operating ever since and a prominent feature of the local community

In recent years the area has become known as an example of an area undergoing gentrification.

== Local street names ==
=== Viking names ===
Apart from the striking artisan dwellings, the area is also known for its prominent Viking street names. For example, there is Viking Road, Olaf Road, Thor Place, Sitric Road, Norseman Place, Ard Ri Road, Malachi Road, Ostman Place, Ivar Street, Sigurd Road and Harold Road. At the time of the Norman invasion, the Vikings, Ostmen or Austmenn (men of the East) as they called themselves, were exiled to the north of the Liffey where they founded the hamlet of Ostmenstown, later to become Oxmantown.

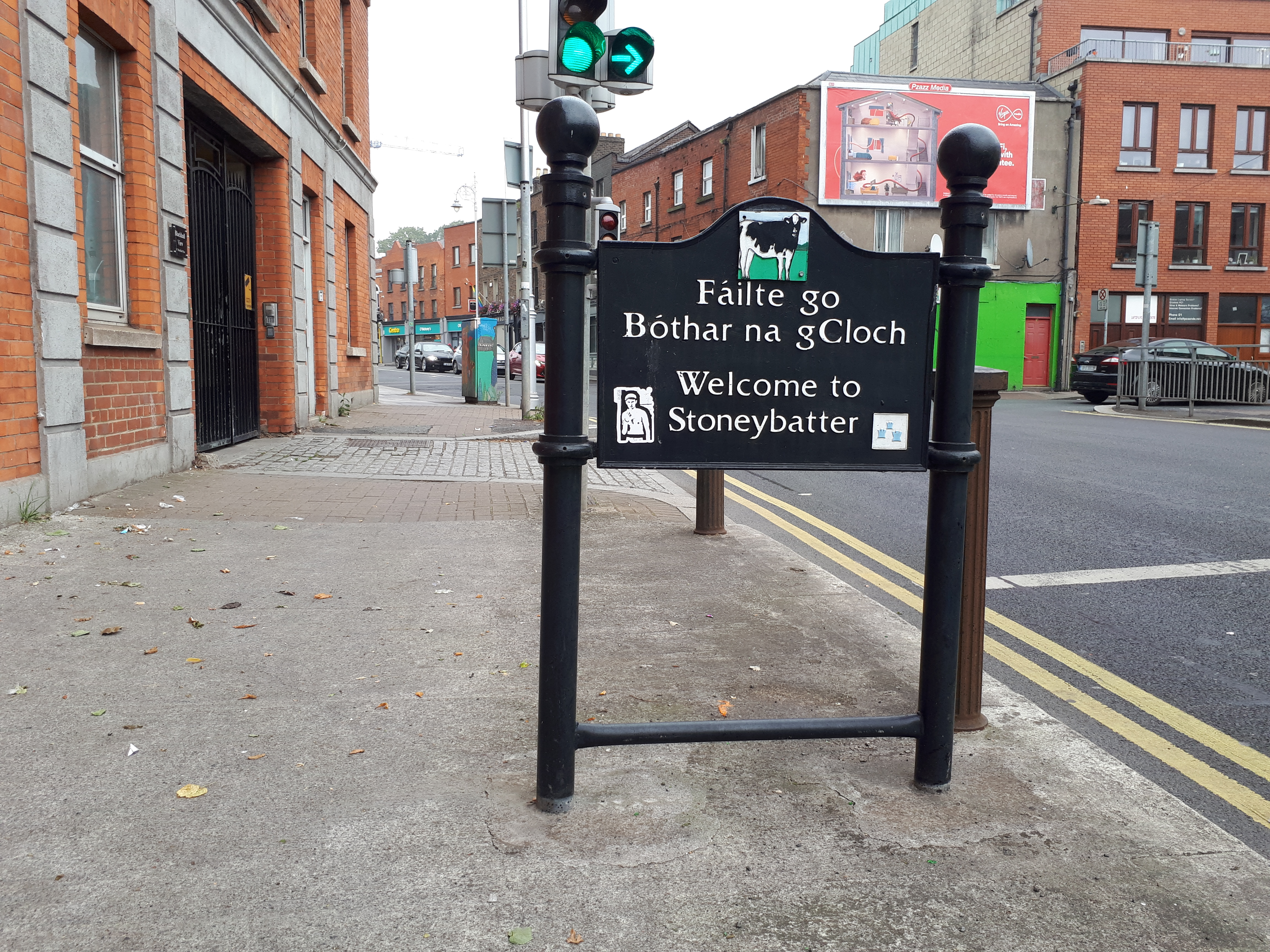
Welcome to Stoneybatter road sign

=== Other street names ===
The northern end of Stoneybatter derives its name of Manor Street, bestowed in 1780, from the Manor of Grangegorman in which it was located. During the reign of Charles II (1660–1680), the Manor was held by Sir Thomas Stanley, a knight of Henry Cromwell and a staunch supporter of the Restoration. The short thoroughfare in Stoneybatter called Stanley Street is named after him.

== Transport ==
Stoneybatter is served by Dublin Bus routes 11/b, 37, 39/a/x, and 70/n, as well as Go-Ahead Ireland route N2. These routes connect the neighbourhood with Dublin city centre, Phoenix Park, Cabra, Ashtown, Castleknock, Blanchardstown, Clonsilla, Ongar, Clonee, Dunboyne, Donnybrook, Clonskeagh, Kilmacud, Sandyford, Broombridge, Glasnevin, Griffith Avenue, Marino and Fairview.

The Luas stops at Smithfield and Phibsborough are located nearby, but no Luas stop directly serves the neighbourhood of Stoneybatter. Heuston station is also close by, served by both InterCity and Commuter rail services.

Due to ita central location, Stoneybatter is popular with residents who walk to work in the city centre.

== Education ==
Among its primary (national) schools are: Stanhope Street Primary School, and St. Gabriels National School. The only secondary school in the area is Stanhope Secondary School.

== Popular culture ==
The streets and surrounding areas of Stoneybatter have been used as a filming location for both TV and film. Notable productions, filmed in the area, include:

=== TV series ===
- Dear Sarah (1989)
- Who Do You Think You Are? (2014)
- Who Do You Think You Are? (Ireland) (2018)
- Modern Love (TV series) (2020)

=== Film ===
- Robbery (1967)
- Educating Rita (1983)
- Michael Collins (1996)
- The Informant (1997)
- The Boxer (1997)
- Angela's Ashes (1999)
- When Brendan Met Trudy (2000)
- Shadow Dancer (2012)
- Love, Rosie (2014)
- Nan: The Movie (2020)
- The Miracle Club (2023)
- Father Mother Sister Brother (2025)

=== Music ===
Its long history means that Stoneybatter has been referred to in ballad songs such as Spanish Lady and The Rakes of Stony Batter.

- The video for the Spice Girls song "Stop" was filmed on Carnew Street.

Stoneybatter is mentioned as the district from which the two sisters, the Misses Morkan, had moved to Usher's Island, in the exposition at the beginning of James Joyce's final story in Dubliners, "The Dead".

Stoneybatter is also the main location for events in the Tana French novel "The Trespasser," and the area is mentioned in the Irish folk song "The Spanish Lady".

== See also ==
- List of towns and villages in the Republic of Ireland
