= St. Brendan's Hospital, Dublin =

St. Brendan's Hospital
- Health Service Executive
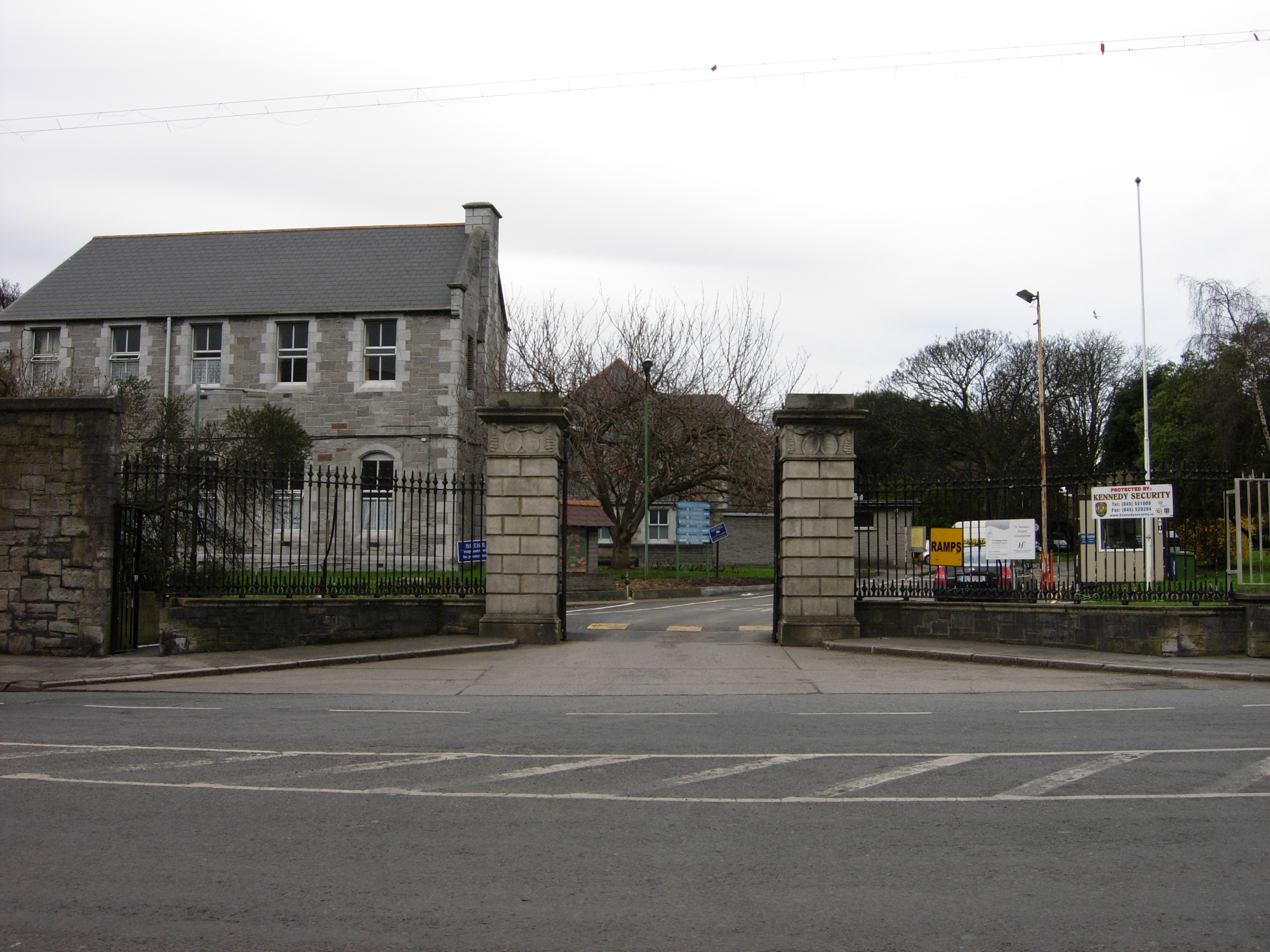
- Entrance to St. Brendan's Hospital

- Shown in Dublin

Geography
- Location: Grangegorman, North Dublin, Ireland
- Coordinates: 53.3571°N 6.2852°W

Organisation
- Care system: HSE
- Type: Specialist

Services
- Beds: 54
- Speciality: Psychiatric hospital

History
- Founded: 1815

St. Brendan's Hospital (Irish: Ospidéal Naomh Breandán) was a psychiatric facility located in the north Dublin suburb of Grangegorman. It formed part of the mental health services of Dublin North East with its catchment area being North West Dublin. It is now the site of a modern mental health facility known as the "Phoenix Care Centre". Since the official opening of the Richmond Lunatic Asylum in 1815 the Grangegorman site has continuously provided institutional facilities for the reception of the mentally ill until the present day. As such the Phoenix Care Centre represents the continuation of the oldest public psychiatric facility in Ireland.

== History ==
Richmond Lunatic Asylum Act 1830 (Note: The citation of this act by this short title was authorised by section 1 of, and the first schedule to, the Short Titles Act 1896. Due to the repeal of those provisions it is now authorised by section 19(2) of the Interpretation Act 1978.)
- Act of Parliament
- Parliament of the United Kingdom
- Long title: An Act for appropriating the Richmond Lunatic Asylum in Dublin to the Purposes of a District Lunatic Asylum.
- Citation: 11 Geo. 4 & 1 Will. 4. c. 22
- Territorial extent: United Kingdom

Dates
- Royal assent: 29 May 1830
- Commencement: 29 May 1830 (Note: The Acts of Parliament (Commencement) Act 1793.)
- Repealed: 5 August 1873
Other legislation
Amended by	Richmond Lunatic Asylum Act 1831; Statute Law Revision Act 1873; Statute Law Revision Act 1890
Repealed by	Statute Law (Repeals) Act 1993

Status: Repealed

Text of statute as originally enacted

Richmond Lunatic Asylum Act 1831
- Act of Parliament
- Parliament of the United Kingdom
- Long title: An Act to amend an Act passed in the Eleventh Year of the Reign of His late Majesty King George the Fourth, intituled "An Act for appropriating the Richmond Lunatic Asylum in Dublin to the Purposes of a District Lunatic Asylum."
- Citation: 1 Will. 4. c. 13
- Territorial extent: United Kingdom

Dates
- Royal assent: 11 March 1831
- Commencement: 11 March 1831
- Repealed: 5 November 1993
Other legislation
Amends	Richmond Lunatic Asylum Act 1830
Amended by	Statute Law Revision Act 1873; Statute Law Revision Act 1890
Repealed by	Statute Law (Repeals) Act 1993

Status: Repealed

Text of statute as originally enacted

In 1810, the governors of the Dublin House of Industry, together with the physician Andrew Jackson, succeeded in gaining a grant from the government to establish a separate asylum from the House of Industry. It was built on a site adjacent to the House of Industry and officially opened as the Richmond Lunatic Asylum in 1815, although it had received its first patients from the lunatic wards of the House of Industry in the previous year. It was named after Charles Lennox, 4th Duke of Richmond, Lord Lieutenant of Ireland. Initially, it was established as a national asylum to receive curable lunatics from throughout the island of Ireland. The facility joined the state system as a "district asylum", as defined in the Lunacy (Ireland) Act 1821 (1 & 2 Geo. 4. c. 33), in 1830, following the passing of the Richmond Lunatic Asylum Act 1830 (11 Geo. 4 & 1 Will. 4. c. 22). Thereafter it was renamed the Richmond District Lunatic Asylum and its catchment area was defined as the city and county of Dublin, the counties of Wicklow, Louth, Meath, and the town of Drogheda.

In the latter years of the First World War, a facility known as the Richmond War Hospital was established in the grounds of the hospital. The War Office closed the war hospital in winter 1919. The main facility became the Grangegorman Mental Hospital in 1925 and St. Brendan's Hospital in 1958.

After the introduction of deinstitutionalisation in the late 1980s the hospital went into a period of decline. In the 2008 Report of the Inspector of Mental Health Services it was recommended that acute admissions to the secure units 3A and 3B should cease due to their unsuitability and all admissions should be redirected to the new purpose-built unit at Connolly Hospital. In June 2010, the Mental Health Commission instructed the hospital to stop the admission of acute patients on account of the "entirely unacceptable and inhumane conditions". After many of the patients had been transferred to Connolly Hospital, the older facilities at St Brendan's Hospital were retired in November 2010.

As part of the Grangegorman Development Plan, where a large portion of the site of the old hospital will be used to develop the new Technological University Dublin campus, new modern psychiatric facilities were developed. A new state-of-the-art "Phoenix Care Centre", comprising 54 bedrooms and ensuites, recreational rooms, clinical rooms, administration areas, seclusion rooms and therapy gardens, opened in March 2013.

== Medical superintendents ==
Medical superintendents included:

- Dr. Joseph Lalor (1857–1886)
- Dr. Conolly Norman (1886–1908)
- Dr. John O'Conor Donelan (1908–1937)
- Prof. John Dunne (1937–1966)
- Prof. Ivor W. Browne (1966–1995)

== Association football clubs ==
Since at least the 1920s various association football teams, including hospital works teams, played in the hospital grounds. These have included Grangegorman F.C. who were FAI Junior Cup finalists in 1928–29 and Leinster Senior Cup finalists in 1946–47. St. Brendan's F.C. were members of the League of Ireland B Division during the 1970s and 1980s. More recently Brendanville F.C., founded in 1963, were members of the Leinster Senior League. All three teams also played in the FAI Cup.

== Gallery ==
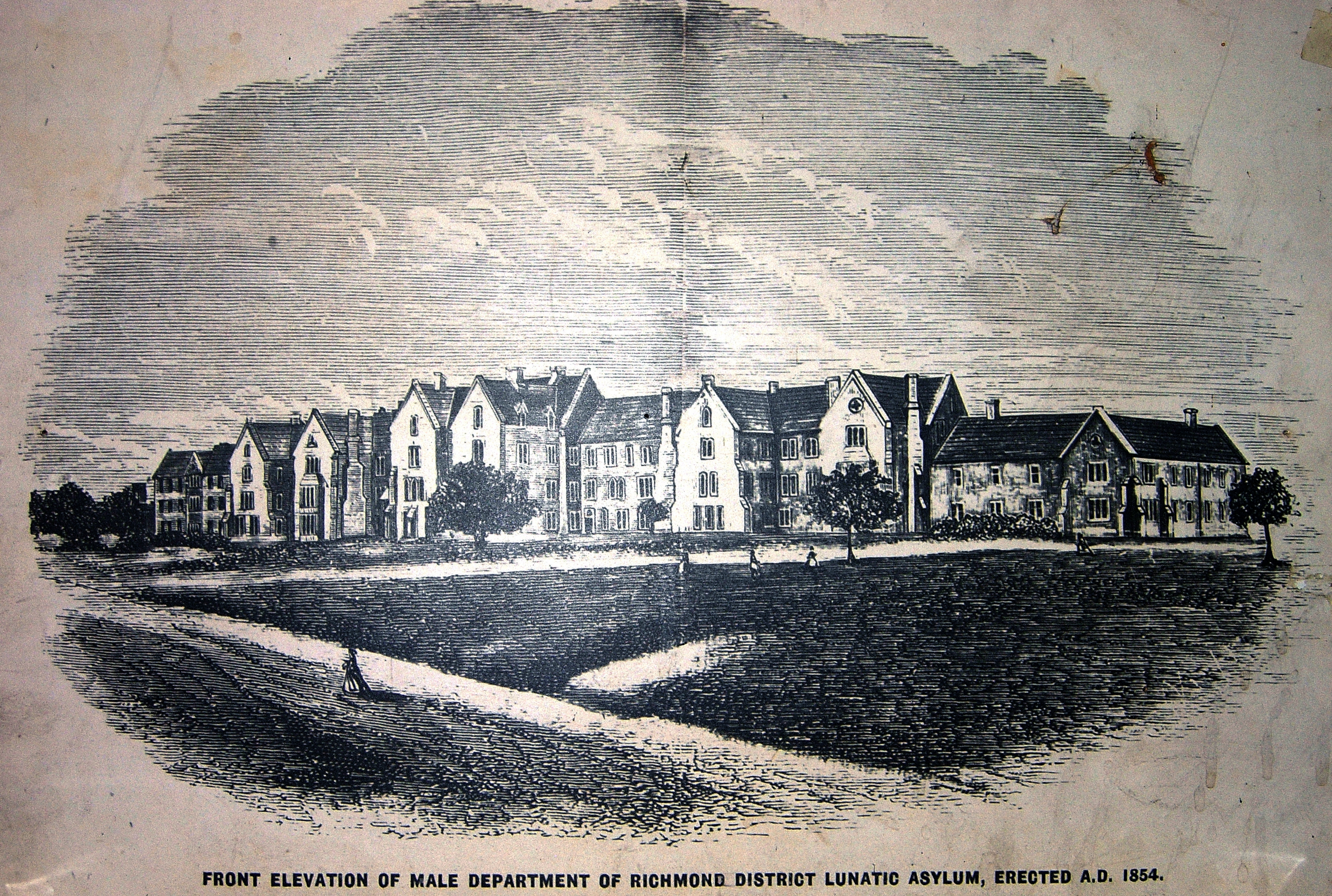
Front elevation of male department (upper house on the west side of Grangegorman Road Upper) of the Richmond District Lunatic Asylum 1854

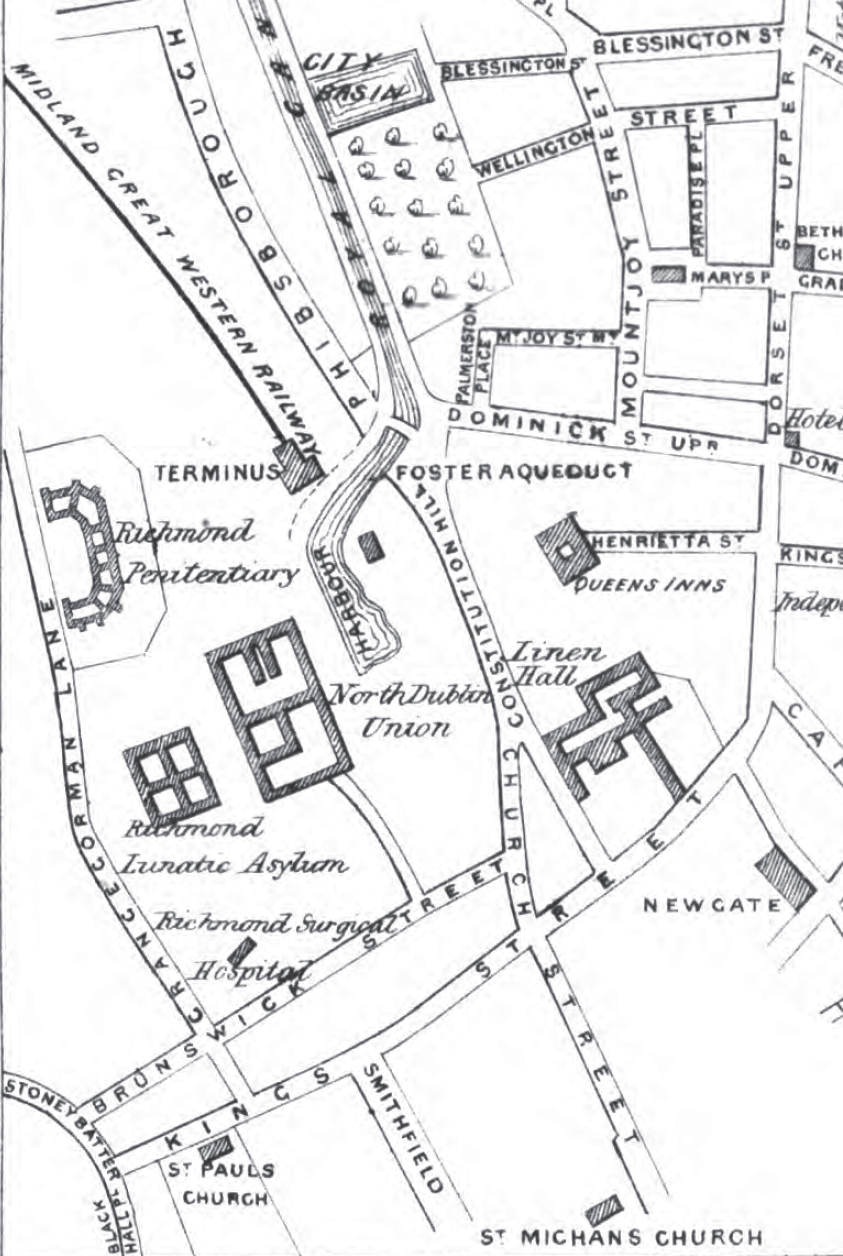
The environs of the Richmond District Asylum in 1862

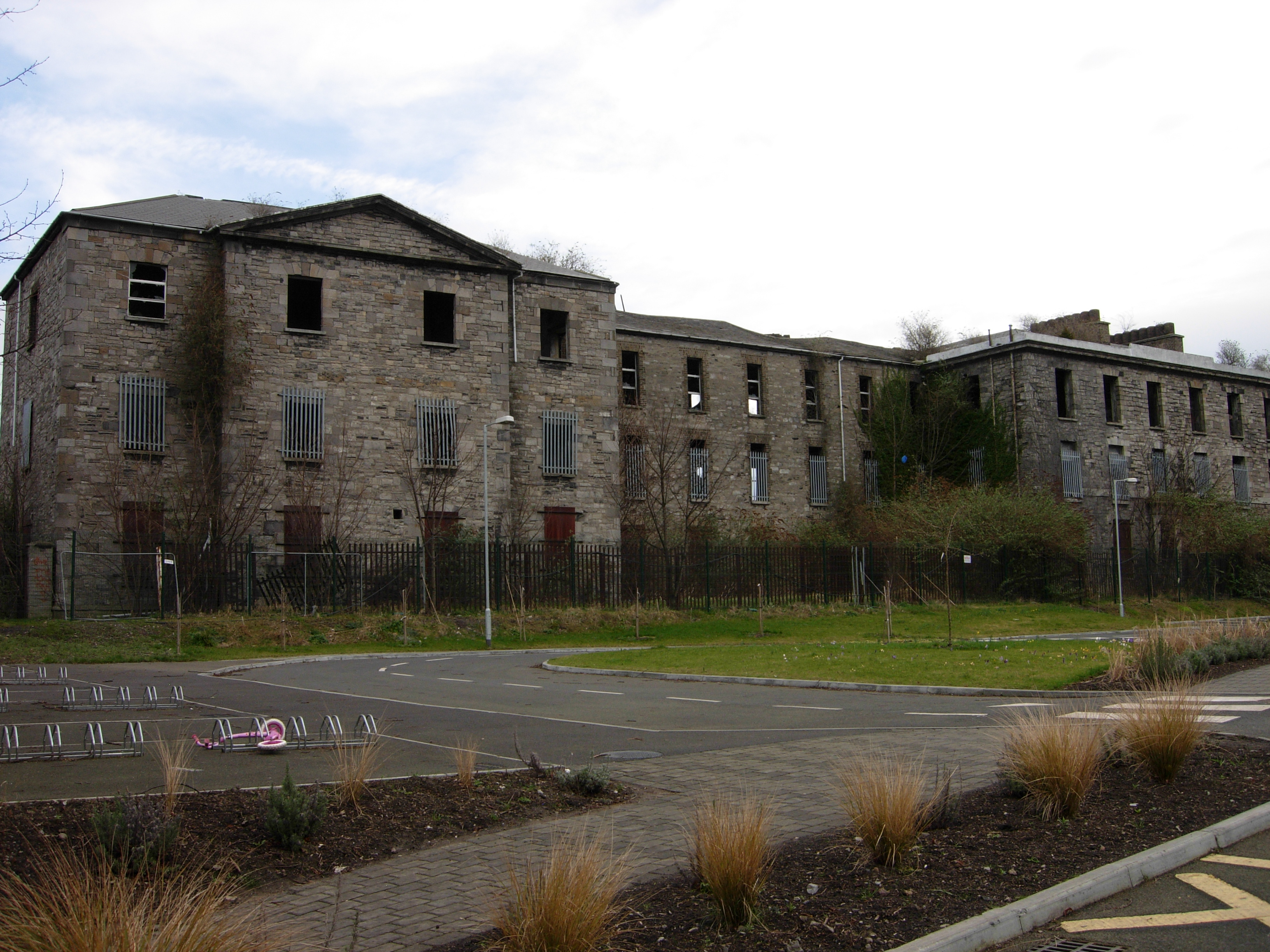
The south wing, which is the only remaining wing of the Richmond Lunatic Asylum

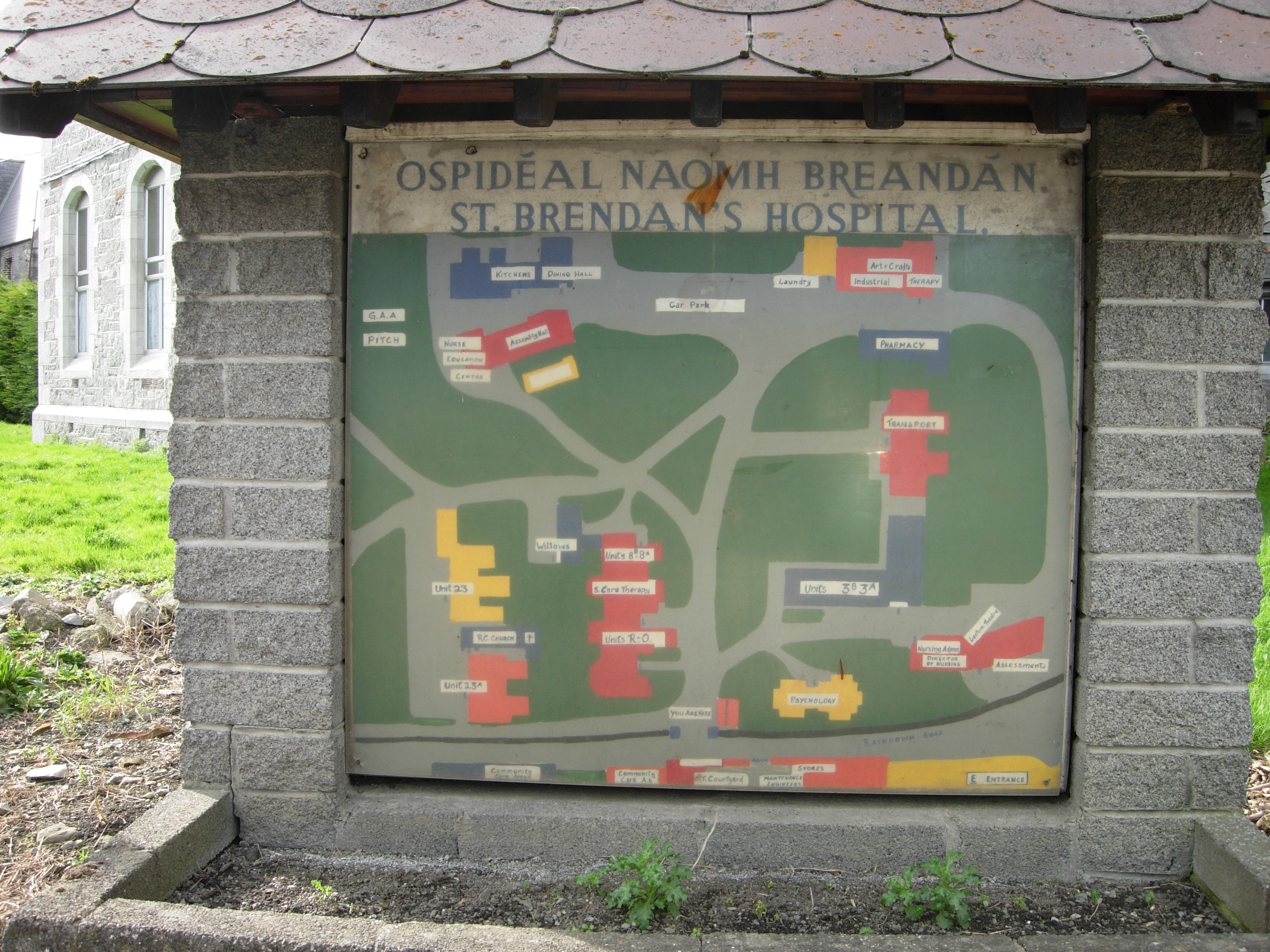
Map of the grounds of St. Brendan's Hospital in 2011
