= Ágnes Lehóczky =

Hungarian poet, academic and translator (born 1976)

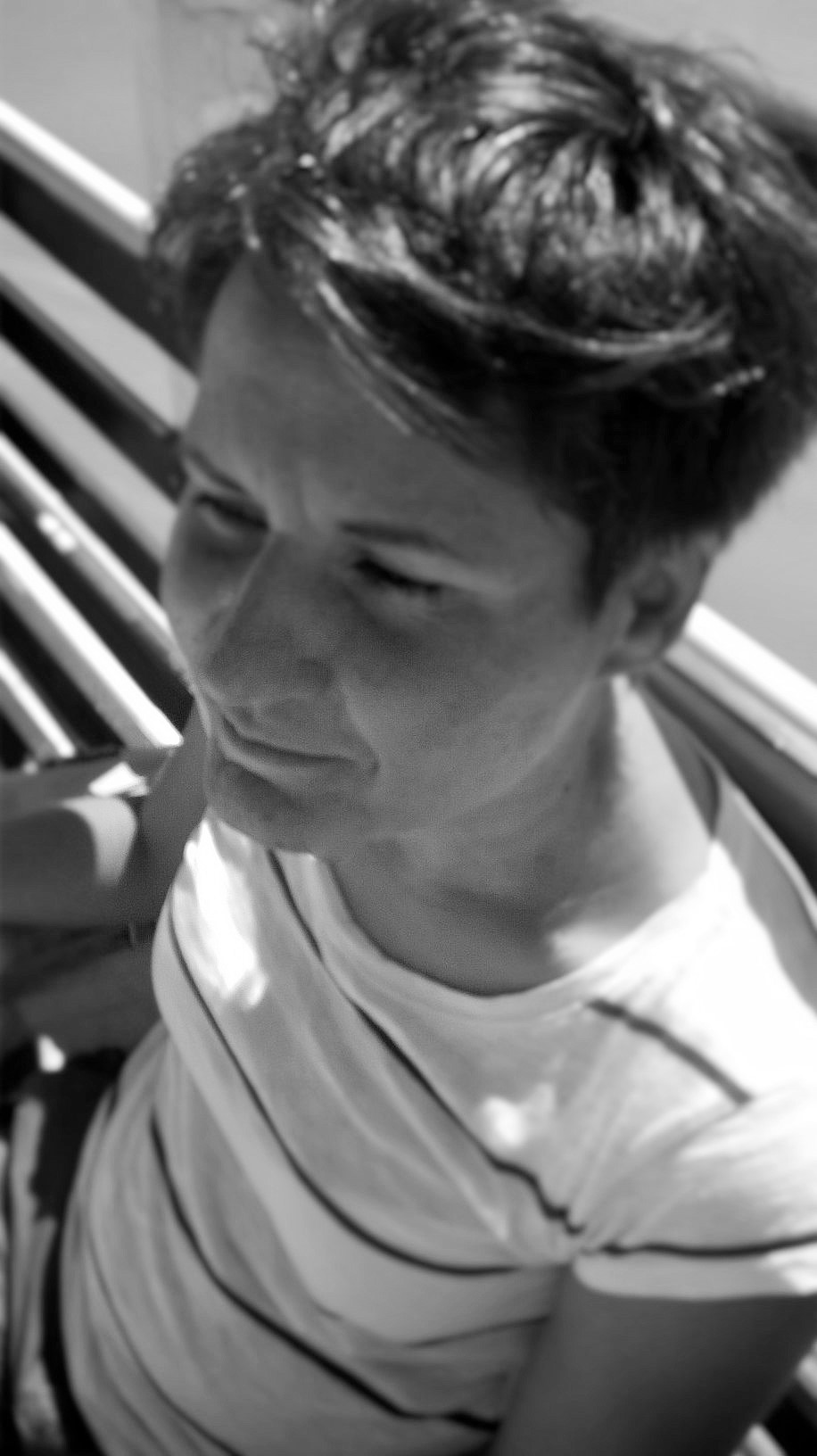
- Born: 1976 (age 49–50); Budapest, Hungary
- Occupations: writer; academic; translator
- Writing career
- Language: English; Hungarian
- Genre: poetry

Ágnes Lehóczky is a Hungarian-British poet, academic, and translator born in Budapest in 1976.

== Biography ==
=== Early life and education ===
Lehóczky completed her master's degree in English and Hungarian Literature at the Pázmány Péter Catholic University in Hungary in 2001 and completed a Master of Arts with distinction in Creative Writing at the University of East Anglia in 2006. She holds a Doctor of Philosophy in Critical and Creative Writing, also from the University of East Anglia, which she obtained in July 2011. Lehóczky is Senior Lecturer in Creative Writing at the University of Sheffield, Co-Director of the Centre for Poetry and Poetics, Sheffield, and Contributing Advisor to Blackbox Manifold literary journal.

=== Career ===
Lehóczky has published several books and pamphlets in English, co-edited three major international poetry anthologies in the United Kingdom, and is the author of an academic monograph on the poetry of Ágnes Nemes Nagy. She also has three poetry collections in Hungarian, published in Budapest, Hungary. Lehóczky has collaborated in various art projects with writers, photographers, composers, musicians, theatre performers, publishers, academics, and translators, including Denise Riley, Adam Piette, Terry O'Connor, Nathan Hamilton, J.T. Welsch, Zoë Skoulding, Elzbieta Wójcik-Leese, Jenny Hval, George Szirtes, Andrew McDonnell, Sian Croose, Jonathan Baker, Henriette Louwerse, Harriet Tarlo, Honor Gavin, Astrid Alben, Amanda Crawley Jackson, Katharine Kilalea, and S.J. Fowler.

In collaboration with the Writers’ Centre Norwich and The Voice Project, her libretto was commissioned for Proportions of the Temple and performed in 2011. In partnership with Citybooks, the University of Sheffield, and deBuren in Brussels, Lehóczky's work Parasite of Town, a prose poem sequence on Sheffield, was published and translated into Dutch and French in 2011.

Her recent work of collaboration, Fission of Being – Endnotes on Earthbound, was curated by the Roberts Institute of Art in London in 2021.

Lehóczky’s poetry has been widely anthologized in the United Kingdom and Hungary and has appeared in:

- The World Record (Bloodaxe, 2012)
- Dear World & Everyone in It: New Poetry in the UK (Bloodaxe, 2013)
- Atlantis (Spirit Duplicator, 2016)
- The Penguin Book of the Prose Poem; From Baudelaire to Anne Carson (Penguin, 2018)
- A századelő irodalma (a three-volumed anthology of Hungarian contemporary literature, ed. Gábor Zsille, Magyar Napló, Budapest, 2017)
- The Valley Press Anthology of Prose Poetry (forthcoming; eds. Anne Caldwell & Oz Hardwick, Valley Press, 2019)
- Archive of the Now (ed. Andrea Brady)
- Hilson Hilson (a Hilson-collective on the poetry of Jeff Hilson, Crater, 2020)
- Nothing on Atkins (an Atkins-collective, Crater, 2023)
- Disease (Carnaval Press, 2022).

Her work has been translated into Polish (Elzbieta Wójcik-Leese), Bulgarian (by Nikolai Boikov), French (by Jean Portante & Michel Perquy), and Dutch (by Hans Kloos). Lehóczky’s various poems appeared in print and online in the United Kingdom, United States, and Europe:

- English (Oxford Journals)
- Datableed
- P. N. Review
- The Wolf
- Blackbox Manifold
- Molly Bloom
- Confluences Poetiques
- Poetry Wales
- Para-text
- 3:AM Magazine
- Kluger Hans
- Long Poem Magazine
- но поезия /No Poesia
- Locomotive Journal
- Make It New
- Arterie
- The Ofi Press
- Magyar Napló
- Kortárs
- Free Verse; a Journal of Contemporary Poetry and Poetics
- Pamenar Magazine
- Chicago Review
- Alföld
- Vigilia
- Irodalmi Jelen
- Modern Poetry in Translation
- Shearsman Magazine

== Publications ==
=== Books/ full poetry collections and recent editorial work ===
- Apropos Paradise Square - On a Literature of Consolation (Pamenar Press, 2025)
- Lathe Biosas, or on Dreams & Lies (Crater Press, 2023)
- Swimming Pool (Shearsman Books, 2017)
- Pool Epitaphs and Other Love Letters (Boiler House Press, 2017)
- Carillonneur (Shearsman Books, 2014)
- Rememberer (Egg Box Publishing, 2012)
- Budapest to Babel (Egg Box Publishing, 2008)

=== Pamphlets ===
- Pool Epitaphs and Other Love Letters (Boiler House Press, 2017)
- Poems from the Swimming Pool (Constitutional Information, December, 2015)

=== Poetry collections in Hungarian ===
- Palimpszeszt (Magyar Napló, Budapest, 2015)
- Medalion (Universitas, Budapest, 2002)
- Ikszedik stáció (Universitas, Budapest, 2000)

=== Academic / monograph ===
- Poetry, the Geometry of Living Substance: Four Essays on the Poetry of Ágnes Nemes Nagy (Cambridge Scholars, 2011)

=== Recent editorial ===
- The Song of the Cosmos – Attila József Selected Poems (ed. Ágnes Lehóczky, trans. Adam Piette and Ágnes Lehóczky, Shearsman Books, 2026).
- A Monk Collective (curated and edited by Ágnes Lehóczky and Adam Piette, Blackbox Manifold, Issue 29, January, 2023).
- The World Speaking Back to Denise Riley (Boiler House Press, 2018) eds. Ágnes Lehóczky and Zoë Skoulding
- Wretched Strangers (Boiler House Press, 2018) eds. Ágnes Lehóczky and J. T. Welsch
- The Sheffield Anthology, Poems from the City Imagined, eds. Ágnes Lehóczky, Adam Piette, Ann Sansom, Peter Sansom (Smith/Doorstop, 2012)

=== Articles, editorial introductions ===
- ‘Endnotes on Disobedient Poetries, Paper Citizens, and Other Agoras,’in Wretched Strangers (Boiler House Press, 2018) eds. Ágnes Lehóczky and J. T. Welsch, (pp 311-322)
- ‘In Defence of Paradoxes: A Preface’, in The World Speaking Back to Denise Riley (Boiler House Press, 2018), eds. Ágnes Lehóczky and Zoë Skoulding, (pp xi-xvii)
- ‘Scribbling In That Other Tongue,’ (essay with 3 poems) in Poetry Wales, April, 2012 (pp31–33)
- ‘Conducting Cacophony,’ in In Their Own Words - Contemporary Poets on Their Poetry, eds. Helen Ivory and George Szirtes (Salt, 2012) (pp45–51)

=== Translation ===
- The Song of the Cosmos – Attila József Selected Poems (ed. Ágnes Lehóczky, trans. Adam Piette and Ágnes Lehóczky, Shearsman Books, 2026)
- Poems by Denise Riley (Alföld, August, 2025 and Lyrikline, 2025)
- I Killed my Mother - András Visky’s play translated with Ailisha O'Sullivan (for the Rosemary Branch Theatre Performance, produced by Summer Dialogues Productions and presented in partnership with the Hungarian Cultural Centre and the Romanian Cultural Institute, London, March, 2013)
- New Order: Hungarian Poets of the Post 1989 Generation, ed. George Szirtes (Arc Publications, 2010)
- Poems by Kemény István and Virág Erdős. (Hungarian Quarterly, April, 2010)
- Poems and essays by Ágnes Nemes Nagy, Zsuzsa Takács, György Somlyó, Imre Kőrizs and Ákos Győrffy in Hungarian Literature Online: poems (www.hlo.hu) 2009
- Poems by Lavinia Greenlaw. (Nagyvilág, 2008, Hungary)

== Radio ==
- BBC The Forum – a World of Ideas, with Guy Deutscher and Claude M. Steele – End of June, 2010.

== Honours and poetry awards ==
- The Jane Martin National Poetry Prize of Girton College, Cambridge, 2011
- The Arthur Welton Award of the Authors’ Foundation/Society of Authors
- Representative Poet of Hungary: Poetry Parnassus, Southbank Centre, London, 2012
- Bertha Bulcsu-Award, Budapest, 2012)
