= Ina Boyle =

Irish composer

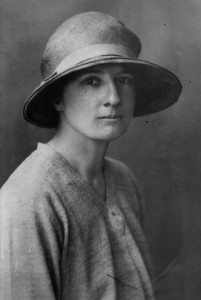

Background information
- Born: 8 March 1889; Enniskerry, County Wicklow
- Died: 10 March 1967 (aged 78) Greystones, County Wicklow
- Genre: classical
- Occupation: composer
- Award: Carnegie Award

Ina Boyle (/ˈiːnə/; 8 March 1889 – 10 March 1967) was an Irish composer. Her compositions encompass a broad spectrum of genres and include choral, chamber and orchestral works as well as opera, ballet and vocal music. While a number of her works, including The Magic Harp (1919), Colin Clout (1921), Gaelic Hymns (1923–24), Glencree (1924-27) and Wildgeese (1942), received acknowledgement and first performances, the majority of her compositions remained unpublished and unperformed during her lifetime.

== Biography ==
Boyle was born in Bushey Park near Enniskerry, County Wicklow, and grew up in a restricted circle consisting of her mother, father and sister. Her first music lessons were with her father William Foster Boyle, who was curate at St. Patrick's Church, Powerscourt, and she was given violin and cello lessons by her governess with her younger sister Phyllis. From the age of eleven, she studied theory and harmony with Samuel Myerscough, the English organist who founded the Leinster School of Music in 1904. From 1904 onwards, she also undertook lessons via correspondence with Charles Wood, who was married to Boyle's cousin Charlotte Georgina Wills-Sandford.

From 1910 Boyle took lessons with Percy Buck who had just been appointed a non-resident professor of music at Trinity College Dublin. By 1913 she was studying counterpoint, harmony and composition with Charles Herbert Kitson and George Hewson in Dublin. Kitson encouraged her to compose the two anthems published in 1915, but his promise of a performance at Christ Church did not happen in the end. From 1923, Boyle began to travel to London to take lessons with Ralph Vaughan Williams. After exchanging correspondence, Boyle took her first composition lesson with Vaughan Williams at his home in February 1923.

Boyle's music received a series of first performances during the 1920s and 1930s in England, but though well-received they were very infrequent. She gained some benefit from her involvement with a group of other young female composers including Elisabeth Lutyens, Elizabeth Maconchy and Grace Williams, who organised a concert series as performance opportunity.

But the need to look after her family at home restricted her travelling, which mostly ceased altogether from the outset of war. Her mother died in 1931, her sister in 1938 and her father in 1951. Boyle continued to compose every day. Though isolated she nevertheless maintained contact with her peers and continually sent her scores to conductors and choir directors in the hope of further performances. In 1944 an orchestral concert devoted to her music was organised by Arthur Duff. However, with one exception (the brief orchestral overture Wildgeese of 1942), no new work of hers ever received a second performance.

Ina Boyle died of cancer in Greystones, County Wicklow.

== Composition ==
Because of her isolation, Boyle's music was seldom performed. However, she continued to compose until her death.

=== Opera ===
Her three-act chamber opera, Maudlin of Paplewick (1956-64) is based upon The Sad Shepherd, or a Tale of Robin Hood - an unfinished pastoral play by Ben Jonson. Unperformed in Boyle's lifetime, it was finally performed in full in a semi-staged version at the Festival Respighi Bologna in October 2026, by Le Foyer des Artistes conducted by Darren Hargan.

=== Orchestral ===
Early recognition came in 1913 when two of her works, the Elegy for cello and orchestra and a setting of Walt Whitman's The Last Invocation, were awarded first and second prizes in the composers' competition at the Sligo Feis Ceoil. In 1919, her orchestral rhapsody The Magic Harp received a Carnegie Award, through which it was published and was taken up by the conductor Dan Godfrey in Bournemouth.

The first of her three symphonies was composed between 1924 and 1927, but had to wait until 1945 for its first complete performance, at a Raidió Éireann studio concert. Subtitled Glencree ("In the Wicklow Hills"), the three movements take the form of tone poems describing specific locations: "On Lacken Hill", "Nightwinds in the Valley", and "Above Lough Bray". The second symphony (The Dream of the Rood), composed in 1930, received its world premiere on 30 September 2022 in Dublin, performed by the RTÉ National Symphony Orchestra, conductor David Brophy.

The brief, three-movement Violin Concerto of the early 1930s has (according to Rob Barnett) "more in common with The Lark Ascending than with the big British Isles statements by Bax, Walton, Dyson, Creith and Moeran of that decade". The Concerto was dedicated to Boyle's mother who had died in 1932.

=== Chamber ===
Her String Quartet in E minor (1934) was dedicated to Anne Macnaghten. A private recording was made by the Macnaghten Quartet, but the score remained in manuscript until a new edition was made in 2011, used for the first modern performance by the Callino Quartet on 4 February 2011. The ConTempo Quartet also performed the quartet in 2022 and a recording was issued in 2023 by the Piatti Quartet. Lament for Bion, a Greek-themed composition for tenor and strings she submitted to the Olympic Cultural Activities Committee, won an Olympic Honourable Mention in 1948 for Ireland.

=== Songs and choral ===
Boyle also wrote about 60 solo songs throughout her career, around half of which have now been recorded. In 2023 the Ina Boyle Society published Selected Songs, containing 26 songs edited by Dr Orla Shannon and David Scott, and composed between 1906 and 1966. The songs were previously only available in manuscript. The early choral work Soldiers at Peace (1916) has been revived by Highgate Choral Society and the New London Orchestra, directed by Ronald Corp, who performed it in London on 2 November 2018. The world premiere of Cædmon's Hymn for six part choir, written in 1925, was given at the Ludlow Festival by the Carice Singers in April 2022.

== Legacy ==
Boyle has been dubbed "the most prolific and significant female composer from Ireland before 1950". Her papers are archived in the Library of Trinity College Dublin. Trinity College has digitised most of her music manuscripts, and they can be searched and studied online. In March 2026 Faber Music announced a publishing partnership with the Ina Boyle estate to publish and promote the composer’s catalogue of over 80 works. Faber said it would prepare pieces still in manuscript for publication and support premier performances.

A feature-length documentary about the life and music of Ina Boyle titled From the Darkness was broadcast 12 June 2010 on Ireland's RTÉ Lyric FM. In April and May 2013, an exhibition at Trinity College highlighted "Ina Boyle’s Symphonic Journey". A CD of some of her major orchestral works, including the first full recording of her Symphony No. 1 and first ever performance of the Psalm for cello and orchestra, was issued by Dutton in 2018. The world premiere of her opera Maudlin of Paplewick is receiving its world première on 16 October 2026 at the Respighi Festival in Bologna by Le Foyer des Artistes.

The Bushey Park Estate passed to the Bisgood family. In 1996 it was bought by the singer Chris De Burgh. It was sold again in 2023.

== Selected works ==
Choral music

- Ireland (Walt Whitman), 1914
- Funeral Anthem (biblical); Stainer & Bell, 1915
- Wilt Not Thou, Oh God (biblical); Novello, 1915
- Soldiers at Peace (Herbert Asquith) for chorus and orchestra (1916); London: Novello, 1917
- The Transfiguration (biblical) for tenor, mixed chorus and organ (1922); London: Novello, 1922
- Gaelic Hymns (from Carmina gadelica, transl. by Alexander Carmichael) (1924); excerpts published London: J. & W. Chester, 1930
- Cædmon's Hymn, for six part choir, transl. by L Magnus and C Headlam (1925)
- Christ is a Path (Giles and Phineas Fletcher), chamber cantata (1925)
- A Spanish Pastoral (St. Teresa, transl. by Arthur Symons) for soprano and male choir (1931); London: Stainer & Bell, 1935

Orchestra

- Elegy (1913), rhapsody for cello and orchestra
- The Magic Harp, orchestral rhapsody (1919); London: Stainer & Bell, 1922
- Colin Clout, pastoral for orchestra (1921)
- Phantasy for violin and chamber orchestra (1926)
- Symphony No. 1: Glencree (1927)
- Psalm for cello and orchestra (1927)
- Symphony No. 2: The Dream of the Rood (1930)
- Overture (1934)
- Violin Concerto (1935)
- Wildgeese, sketch for small orchestra (1942)

Solo voice with orchestra

- Lament for Bion (attr. Moschus) for tenor solo and strings (1945)
- Still Falls the Rain (Edith Sitwell) for alto and string orchestra (1948)
- Symphony No. 3: From the Darkness (Edith Sitwell) for contralto and orchestra (1951)
- No Coward Soul is Mine (Emily Brontë) for alto and string orchestra (1953)

Songs (for voice and piano, if not otherwise mentioned)

- The Joy of Earth (Æ = George Russell) (1914)
- Have You News of My Boy Jack? (Rudyard Kipling) (1916)
- A Song of Shadows, a Song of Enchantment (Walter de la Mare) (1922); London: Stainer & Bell, 1923, 1926
- If You Let Sorrow in on You (Winifred M. Letts) (1922)
- Sleep Song (Déirín Dé, tr. Pádraic Pearse) (1923)
- A Mountain Woman (Padraic Pearse, tr. Thomas MacDonagh) (1927)
- Five Sacred Folksongs of Sicily (Grace Warrack) (1930)
- Thinke then my Soul (John Donne) for tenor and string quartet (1938); Oxford: Oxford University Press, 1939
- Three Medieval Latin Lyrics: "Sleep"; "Storm"; "Evening on the Moselle" (1955)
- Three Songs by Ben Jonson for medium voice, violin, cello (1955)
- Three Ancient Irish Poems (transl. by Kuno Meyer) for soprano, viola, harp (1958)
- Three Songs by Walter de la Mare: "Song of the Mad Prince"; "The Pigs and the Charcoal-Burner"; "Moon, Reeds, Rushes"; "Looking Back" (1956)

Opera

- Maudlin of Paplewick (after The Sad Shepherd by Ben Jonson), pastoral opera (1966)

Ballet scores

- Virgilian Suite (1931), ballet suite for small orchestra
- The Dance of Death (1936), a masque for dancing after Holbein
- The Vision of Er (1939), a mimed drama or ballet

Chamber music

- String Quartet in E minor (1934)

== Recordings ==
- The Magic Harp, performed by Bournemouth Symphony Orchestra, Ronald Corp (cond.), on: Dutton Epoch CDLX 7276 (2011).
- The Wild Geese, performed by European Union Youth Orchestra, Laurent Pillot (cond.), on: Classical Recording Company CRC 2309 (2013).
- Sleep Song and Three Songs by Walter de la Mare, performed by Aylish Kerrigan (mezzo) and Dearbhla Collins (piano), on: Métier MSV 28558 (2016).
- Elegy, performed by Nadège Rochat (cello), Staatskapelle Weimar, Paul Meyer (cond.), on: Ars Produktion ARS 38 221 (2017).
- Orchestral works: Overture; Violin Concerto; Symphony No. 1 Glencree; Wildgeese; Psalm; A Sea Poem; Colin Clout, performed by BBC Concert Orchestra, Benjamin Baker (violin), Nadège Rochat (cello), Ronald Corp (cond.), on: Dutton Epoch CDLX 7352 (2018).
- Songs: Since thou, o fondest and truest; The Joy of Earth; Three Songs by Walter de la Mare; A Mountain Woman Asks for Quiet that her Child May Sleep; Looking Back; Himself and his Fiddle; Have you News of my Boy, Jack?; Roses; A Soft Day; Eternity; Sleep Song; All Souls' Flower; Five Sacred Folksongs of Sicily; A Song of Shadows; A Song of Enchantment; The Bringer of Dreams; Longing; Dust; The Stolen Child; Blessing; They Went Forth; Two Christmas Songs; The Last Invocation; performed by Paula Murrihy (mezzo), Robin Tritschler, (tenor), Ben McAteer (baritone), Iain Burnside (piano), on: Delphian DCD324264 (2021).
- String Quartet in E minor; Piatti Quartet, Rubicon RCD1098 (2023)
- Still Falls the Rain, Lament for Bion, Piatti Quartet, Sharon Carty, James Gilchrist. Rubicon RCD1130 (2026)

== Bibliography ==
- Elizabeth Maconchy: Ina Boyle. An Appreciation with a Select List of Her Music (Dublin: Dolmen Press, 1974).
- Sheila Powerscourt: "Powerscourt and Ina Boyle", in: S. Powerscourt: Sun too Fast (London: Bles, 1974), pp. 201–15.
- Axel Klein: Die Musik Irlands im 20. Jahrhundert (Hildesheim: Georg Olms Verlag, 1996), pp. 174–6, 368–71.
- Sonya Keogh: Ina Boyle. A Life and Work (MPhil, University College Cork, 2002).
- David Scott: Examining the Irish Art Song: Original Song Settings of Irish Texts by Irish Composers, 1900–1930 (MPhil, DIT, 2018).
- Ita Beausang, Séamas de Barra: Ina Boyle (1889–1967). A Composer's Life (Cork: Cork University Press, 2018); ISBN 9781782052647.
- Ina Boyle, Ina Boyle: Selected Songs, ed. by Orla Shannon and David Scott (London: Ina Boyle Society Ltd., 2023), https://chimesmusic.com/sheet-music/vocal-choral/vocal-repertoire/selected-songs-/.
