= Florence Culwick =

Irish musical director

- Born: 4 November 1877; 21 Upper Lesson Street, Dublin
- Died: 30 August 1929 (aged 51); Portobello, Dublin
- Education: Alexandra College
- Occupation: choir director

Florence Culwick (4 November 1877 – 30 August 1929) was an Irish musical conductor who became the director of the Culwick Choral Society.

== Biography ==
Florence Culwick was born at 21 Upper Lesson Street, Dublin. She was the daughter of James Cooksey Culwick (1845–1907), professor of music, and Mary Jane (née Richardson), his second wife. She attended Alexandra College, Dublin, excelling at music. She went on to teach music at Alexandra College. Her father held a number of positions as organist in Dublin, finally at Chapel Royal, Dublin Castle where he remained until his death in 1907. Following his death, Florence Culwick re-established his choral society after a hiatus, initially called Miss Culwick's Choral Society. This made her Dublin's first female conductor.

During World War I the choir was exclusively female, but in 1919 it was back at full strength and flourishing. It was Culwick who attracted artists like Dorothy Silk and John Goss to Dublin while also encouraging local talent. Among the notable performances was the first performance in Dublin of Granville Bantock's Vanity of Vanities and Ralph Vaughan Williams's Mass in G minor. In 1927, the choir won a prize at the Welsh Eisteddfod at Holyhead. Following this the choir was renamed in honour of her father and her success, the Culwick Choral Society.

Culwick died aged 51 in a nursing home in Portobello, Dublin. The Florence Culwick Memorial Cup at the Feis Ceoil was established in her honour.
