= James Cooksey Culwick =

English musician resident in Ireland

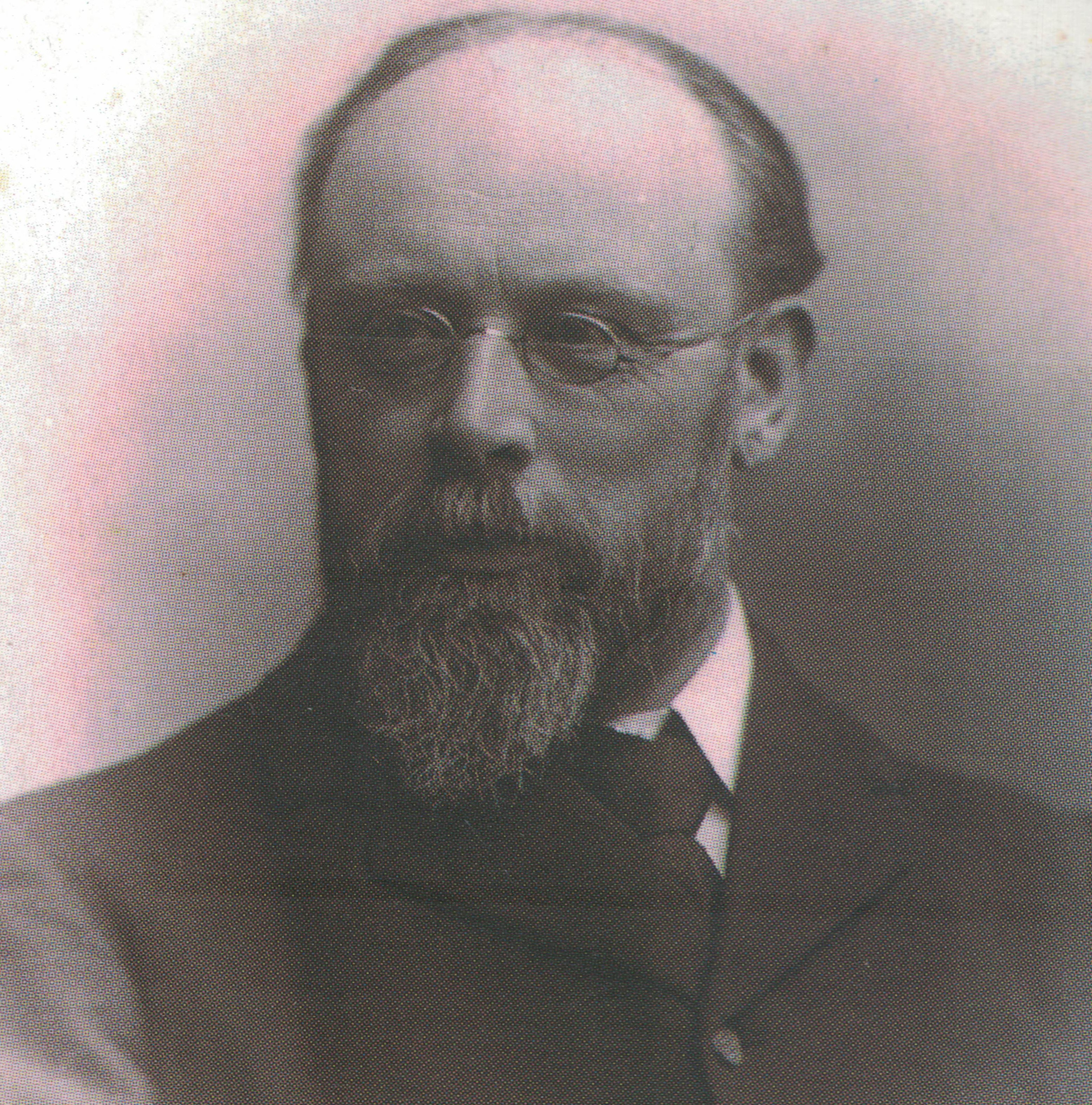
- Church Organist/Musician/Composer
- Born: 28 April 1845; West Bromwich, Staffordshire
- Died: 5 October 1907 (aged 62); Upper Mount Street, Dublin
- Occupations: Church organist, choral director
- Children: Florence; Arthur

James Cooksey Culwick (28 April 1845 – 5 October 1907) was an English musician who is most well known for being organist of the Chapel Royal and founding the Orpheus Choir, both in Dublin, Ireland. The Culwick Choral Society is both named in honour of Culwick and traces its lineage to the Orpheus Choir.

== Biography ==
=== Early life ===
Culwick was born in West Bromwich, Staffordshire, England. At the age of fourteen he became a chorister in Lichfield Cathedral where his father, also a musician, was a lay clerk. He took lessons from the then cathedral organist, Thomas Bedsmore, and was later appointed assistant organist. He subsequently took the role of church organist at the Church of St Chad, Lichfield.

=== Ireland ===
Culwick moved to Ireland in 1866, filling the position of organist at Parsonstown, King's County, before moving to Bray Parish Church in 1870 and then St. Ann's Church, Dawson Street in 1871. In 1881, he was appointed as organist to the Chapel Royal at Dublin Castle. A 1907 Irish Times obituary states that he enjoyed a "high reputation" as a teacher already at an early stage in his career.

Culwick founded a private society, known as "Harmonie", which attracted amateur singers and musicians, and subsequently founded the Orpheus Choir.

He was involved in the establishment of the Feis Ceoil, and from 1913 the Culwick Cup was awarded in his honour in the choral competitions. With Sir Robert Prescott Stewart, he helped establish a branch of the Incorporated Society of Musicians in Dublin.

=== Marriage and children ===
Culwick was married twice, first to Alice Mary Harrison of Lichfield (died 1875), then to Mary Richardson, "a daughter of the late Dr Benjamin Richardson of Dublin". His children were:

- Arthur Culwick (born 1873), clergyman and sometime incumbent of Crinken Church, Bray
- Florence Culwick (1877–1929), conductor and choir director

=== Death ===
Culwick died at his home, 57 Upper Mount Street, Dublin, having been ill for four weeks.

== Selected works ==
=== Compositions ===
- Ballade, for piano (London: Augener & Co., c.1870)
- Sonata No. 1, Op. 3, for organ (London, c.1882)
- Sonatina, Op. 4, for piano (2nd edition, Dublin: Pohlmann, c.1870)
- Three Songs, Op. 5 (Dublin: Pohlmann, not dated)
- Magnificat and Nunc Dimittis in A, Op. 6 (Dublin: Pohlmann, not dated)
- Suite, for piano (2nd edition, London: Augener & Co., 1875)
- Quartett für Pianoforte, Op. 7 (piano quartet in E-flat) (Leipzig: Breitkopf & Härtel, 1880)
- Te Deum laudamus, Jubilate Deo, Op. 8 (2nd edition, Dublin: Cramer, Wood & Co., c.1892)
- Ballade No. 2, Op. 9, for piano (London: Weekes & Co., 1887)
- The Legend of Stauffenberg. A Dramatic Cantata (libretto by Dr. John Todhunter) (c.1890)
- Two Choruses, with Orchestra (1. The Mermaids' Cave; 2. Fairy Song) (words by J. Todhunter) (published in piano reduction, Dublin, c.1890)
- Songs by E. J. Armstrong and G. F. Armstrong, Op. 10 (London: Weekes & Co., 1891)
- Elegy, composed in […] memory of Sir Robert Stewart […], the words taken from Milton's 'Lycidas' (Hull: Archibald, c.1894)
- Bless the Lord, O my Soul. Anthem, Op. 14 (London: Office of "The Organist", 1896)
- O Lord, the Great and Dreadful God. Full anthem for four voices, etc. (London: Office of "The Organist", 1896)
- Nine Irish Melodies, true to their scales, for harp or piano (Dublin: Feis Ceoil, 1897)
- Sonata No. 2, Op. 19, for organ (London: C. Vincent, 1898)
- Resting-Time, four-part song, Op. 21 (words by J. F. Waller) (London: C. Vincent, 1899)
- The Heavens Declare the Glory of God. Motet for soprano, mezzo-soprano and contralto, Op. 22 (London: C. Vincent, 1900)
- Prayer and Praise. Andante in E-flat (London: The Organ Loft, Book 27, no. 83, 1901)
- Greek War Song, for soli, semi-chorus and full chorus (London: Vincent Music Co., 1902)
- Spring Song. Trio for soprano, mezzo soprano and contralto, Op. 27 (words by A. Tomson) (London: Vincent Music Co., 1902)
- Sunset. Four-part song, Op. 28 (words by "F. M. C.") (London: Vincent Music Co., 1902)
- Spring. Choral rondo (London: Vincent Music Co., 1905)

=== Writings ===
- The Study of Music and its Place in General Education (Dublin, 1882)
- The Rudiments of Music. An Introductory Text-book with Musical Examples and Numerous Exercises (Dublin: E. Ponsonby, 1887)
- Handel's Messiah: Discovery of the Original Word-Book Used at the First Performance in Dublin, April 13, 1742 (Dublin: University Press, 1891). According to Culwick's obituary, this put to an end the controversy over whether the original performance of the Messiah had taken place in Dublin.
- The Distinctive Characteristics of Ancient Irish Melody: the Scales (Dublin: E. Ponsonby, 1897)
- Sir Robert Stewart. With Reminiscences of his Life and Works. Paper read at Ripon on July 21st at a meeting of the Yorkshire Section (Derby: Chadfield and Son, 1900)
- The Works of Sir Robert Stewart, Mus.D. Catalogue of his Musical Compositions […] Together with a List of his Principal Literary Works (Dublin: University Press, 1902)
- "Fifty Years in the Life of a Great Irish Musician". Conference paper on Sir Robert Stewart presented at the Incorporated Society of Musicians in Dublin Conference (Derby: Chadfield & Son, 1903)

== Honours, awards and distinctions ==
Culwick was conferred the degree of Doctor in Music honoris causa by the University of Dublin on 29 June 1893.

In 1909, a memorial tablet was placed in the south choir aisle of St Patrick's Cathedral, Dublin in his memory for his work as organist and choir master of the Chapel Royal. The memorial consists of a bronze portrait medallion with marble frame, designed by Oliver Sheppard and Sir Thomas Drew respectively. It states:

James Cooksey Culwick. Mus.Doc.
Trinity College, Dublin.
Born 28th April 1845. Died 5th October, 1907.
A learned musician. A true artist. A good man.

This tablet is erected in affectionate remembrance by members and supporters of the Orpheus Choral Society, of which he was the founder and conductor, 1896–1907.
