= The Voice Project =

The Voice Project may refer to:

- Voice Project (non-profit), a non-profit advocacy group focused on promoting freedom of artistic expression as an agent of social change.
- The Voice Project (music), an open-access singing project, based in Norwich, England.
