= George Darley =

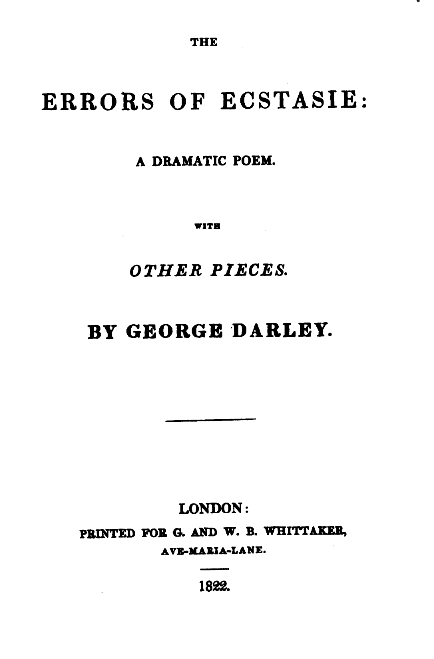
The title of Errors of Ecstasie (1822) by George Darley

George Darley (1795–1846) was an Irish poet, novelist, literary critic, and author of mathematical texts. Friends with such literary luminaries as Charles Lamb, Thomas Carlyle, and John Clare, he was considered by some to be on a level with Tennyson in “poetic possibilities” in the 1840s, but in the words of famous literary critic George Saintsbury “he had the marks of a talent that never did what was in it to do.”

== Biography ==
George Darley was born in Dublin, to Arthur Darley and his wife Mary. The Darleys were an important Dublin family of their time, and related to the Guinnesses by marriage, Arthur's sister Mary having married Richard Guinness, whose uncle Arthur Guinness founded the Guinness brewing company. The Darleys also had a country house called Springfield in south County Dublin, near Enniskerry in County Wicklow, where George spent his early years.

George was awarded a BA in mathematics and classics from Trinity College Dublin in 1820. Having decided to follow a literary career, in 1821 he moved to London. He wrote poetry and plays in an attempt to break into literary circles, but had more luck getting published as a critic. During this period he supported himself by writing several mathematical texts for a series published by John Taylor called Darley's Scientific Library. In later life, he fell into depression and died on 23 November 1846 in London.

Playwright Dion Boucicault was a nephew. His grandnephew was the Irish musician and music collector Arthur Warren Darley.

== Works ==
Darley published his first poem, Errors of Ecstasie, in 1822. He also wrote for the London Magazine, under the pseudonym of John Lacy. In it appeared his story Lilian of the Vale, later reprinted in his short-story collection The Labours of Idleness, or, Seven Nights' Experiments (1826), published under the pseudonym "Guy Penseval." Various other books followed, including Sylvia, or The May Queen, a poem (1827).

Thereafter Darley joined the Athenaeum, in which he became a severe critic. He was also a dramatist and studied old English plays, editing those of Beaumont and Fletcher in 1840. His poem "It is not beauty I demand" was included by F. T. Palgrave in the first edition of his Golden Treasury as an anonymous lyric of the 17th century.

Darley wrote a number of songs such as "I've been Roaming", once popular, and praised by Samuel Taylor Coleridge.

He was also a mathematician, and published some treatises on the subject.

His works included:

- Nepenthe
- Sylvia; or, The May Queen
- The Mermaidens' Vesper-Hymn
- The Sea-Bride
- Thomas à Beckett: A Dramatic Chronicle in Five Acts
- A System of Popular Algebra (John Taylor, London, 1826?).
- A System of Popular Geometry (John Taylor, London, 1826).
- A System of Popular Trigonometry (John Taylor, London, 1827).
- The Geometrical Companion (John Taylor, London, 1828).
- Familiar Astronomy (John Taylor, London, 1830).

== Reputation ==
A. E. Housman said of a passage from his poem Nepenthe, "Admirers of the sea may call that a lampoon or a caricature, but they cannot deny that it is life-like: the man who wrote it had seen the sea, and the man who reads it sees the sea again". Darley was a friend of such literary luminaries as Charles Lamb, Thomas Carlyle, John Clare, and other writers such as Allan Cunningham and Monckton Milnes. Many considered him on a with level with Tennyson in “poetic possibilities” in the 1840s; but, in the words of famous literary critic George Saintsbury, “he had the marks of a talent that never did what it had it in it to do.”

As a critic he was considered capable, but attracted some hostility with his savage treatment of authors he disliked.

== Arms ==
Coat of arms of George Darley
Notes Confirmed by Sir Chicester Fortescue, Ulster King of Arms, 26 November 1804. Crest A horse's head couped Argent accoutred in Armour Proper bridled Gules. Escutcheon Gules six fleurs-de-lis Argent three two and one within a bordure Ermine on a canton of the second a trefoil slipped Proper. Motto Dare
