= The Voice Project (music) =

The Voice Project is an open-access singing project, based in Norwich, England. It is a registered charity and a limited company. It was created by singers Siân Croose and Jonathan Baker in 2008. In 2018, it established a choir in Brighton. It won a Norfolk Arts Award for Music in 2021 and the EDP People's Choice Award for Best Large Organisation in 2013.

== Musical directors ==
Siân Croose is a singer, conductor and performance maker with over 30 years' experience creating and directing music projects in the UK. After an apprenticeship in bands and alternative theatre, she trained on the Community Music programme founded by John Stevens. She has run choirs, vocal ensembles, and workshops for singers since 1990, and performed with composer Helen Chadwick and a cappella ensemble Human Music in a wide range of UK festivals and performance projects. Composition projects include Harmonium, a wordless systems-based a cappella project for women's voices and The Dawn Chorus with American composer Brendan Taaffe. She runs Norwich-based choir Big Sky, regularly commissioning new music from award-winning songwriter Chris Wood and others, and performing with storyteller Hugh Lupton and multi-instrumentalist Adrian Lever.

Jon Baker is a singer, teacher and composer who has written extensively for TV, radio and theatre. He is a founder-member of The Neutrinos with whom he has toured throughout Europe and North America. He is a co-founder of The Voice Project and also a co-founder of KlangHaus.

== Projects ==
In most years, two shows have been presented, across Norfolk, Sussex and Suffolk.

Year	Project(s)
2008	In Tsegihi
2009	I Prefer the Gorgeous Freedom, Winter Songs (2009)
2010	Recording Angel, Winter Songs (2010)
2011	Glossolalia, The Proportions of the Temple, Winter Songs (2011)
2012	Singing the City (From Dawn to Dusk), City of Strangers
2013	Ideas of Flight, Nocturne
2014	Souvenir, Lost & Found
2015	The Observatory
2016	Norwich Over The Water (Singing the City), Red Shift
2017	The Arms of Sleep, Between Stars
2018	Travels in Light, Timepiece, The Sky is Full of Light
2019	Nocturne (Songs for a Winters Night), I Reach Right Up to the Sun, And is This a Dream
2020	Arc of the Sky
2021	The Distance Between Us, The Recording Choir
2022	Arc of the Sky
2023	Distance Between Us, Arc of the Sun
2024	The Lie of the Land

=== In Tsegihi ===
Commissioned from Jon Hassell by Norfolk & Norwich Festival, and performed in Norwich Cathedral in May 2008. Music performed by Jon Hassell (Trumpet, Keyboard), Peter Freeman (Bass, Laptop), Jan Bang (live sampling) and Pete Lockett (Drums). Sound and Sound Design by Arnaud Mercier.

=== I Prefer the Gorgeous Freedom ===
Commissioned from Gwilym Simcock by Norfolk & Norwich Festival and Sage Gateshead, and performed in Norwich Cathedral (May 2009), Sage Gateshead, and Queen Elizabeth Hall in London. The London concert was broadcast by BBC Radio 3. Music performed by Gwilym Simcock (Piano), Yuri Goloubev (Bass), Klaus Gesing (Sax) and James Maddren (Drums). Solo singers were Sianed Jones (Soprano), Rebecca Askew (Alto), Siân Croose (Alto), Jeremy Avis (Tenor) and Jonathan Baker (Bass).

=== Winter Songs (2009) ===
Norwich Catholic Cathedral December. Solo singers: Bex Mather & Sharon Durant (Soprano), Katherine Zeserson & Siân Croose (Alto), Dave Camlin & Jonathan Baker (Bass).

=== Recording Angel ===
Commissioned from Arve Henriksen and Jan Bang by Norfolk & Norwich Festival and performed in Norwich Cathedral in May 2010. Music performed by Arve Henriksen (Trumpet) and Jan Bang (live sampling). Solo singers were Sianed Jones (Soprano), Rebecca Askew (Alto), Jeremy Avis (Tenor) and Jonathan Baker (Bass).

=== Winter Songs (2010) ===
Norwich Catholic Cathedral December. Music performed by Lewis Wright (Vibraphone) and Adrian Lever (Piano). Solo singers: Sianed Jones & Helen Chadwick (Soprano), Katherine Zeserson & Siân Croose (Alto), Dave Camlin & Jonathan Baker (Bass).

=== Glossolalia ===
Commissioned from Andy Sheppard by Norfolk & Norwich Festival and performed as part of Jazz Sous Les Pommiers in Coutances, Normandy, Northern France in 2010, and also at Sage Gateshead as part of Gateshead International Jazz Festival in March 2007.

Music performed by Andy Sheppard (Tenor and Soprano Saxophone), John Parricelli (Guitar), Kuljit Bamra (Tabla and Percussion). Solo singers were Sianed Jones (Soprano), Katherine Zeserson (Alto) and Jonathan Baker (Bass). The Coutances Choir with The Voice Project Choir was conducted by Siân Croose.

=== The Proportions of the Temple ===
Commissioned from Nik Bärtsch by Norfolk & Norwich Festival and performed in Norwich Cathedral in May 2011. Music performed by Nik Bärtsch and Trio Zèphyr. Solo singers were Sianed Jones (Soprano), Rebecca Askew (Alto), Jeremy Avis (Tenor) and Jonathan Baker (Bass).

=== Winter Songs (2011) ===
This piece was performed in Norwich (Catholic) Cathedral in December 2011.

Music performed by Adrian Lever (Piano). The Voice Project Quintet were Sianed Jones & Helen Chadwick (Soprano), Katherine Zeserson & Siân Croose (Alto) and Dave Camlin & Jonathan Baker (Bass).

=== Singing the City (From Dawn to Dusk) ===
This piece was commissioned by Norfolk & Norwich Festival and performed in various locations around Norwich in May 2012.

Composed by Orlando Gough, Helen Chadwick, Jonathan Baker and Jeremy Avis. The Voice Project Quartet were Sianed Jones (Soprano), Rebecca Askew (Alto), Jeremy Avis (Tenor) and Jonathan Baker (Bass).

=== City of Strangers ===
This piece was performed in the Friends Meeting House, Norwich on 15 December 2012.

Composed by Karen Wimhurst, Jonathan Baker, Orlando Gough. The Voice Project Quintet were Sianed Jones (Soprano); Rebecca Askew, Siân Croose, Katherine Zeserson (Alto); Dave Camlin & Jonathan Baker (Bass).

=== Ideas of Flight ===
This piece was commissioned by Norfolk & Norwich Festival and performed in Norwich (Anglican) Cathedral on 11 May 2013 and at St. Benet's Abbey on 13 May 2013.

Music composed by Barbara Thompson, Orlando Gough, Karen Wimhurst and Jonathan Baker. Music performed by Andy Sheppard (Saxophone) and Trio Zephyr. The Voice Project Quintet were Sianed Jones (Soprano), Rebecca Askew and Siân Croose (Alto), Jeremy Avis (Tenor) and Jonathan Baker (Bass). 'The Birds of East London' was read by Stephen Watts.

=== Nocturne ===
This piece was performed in Norwich (Anglican) Cathedral on 14 December 2013.

Musicians: Derek Scurll (Percussion) and Adrian Lever (Chamber Organ). The Voice Project Quintet were Sharon Durant (Soprano), Katherine Zeserson & Siân Croose (Alto), Dave Camlin & Jonathan Baker (Bass).

=== Souvenir ===
This piece was commissioned by Norfolk & Norwich Festival and performed on Holkham Hall estate on 17 May 2014.

Music composed by Orlando Gough, Helen Chadwick, Karen Wimhurst and Jonathan Baker. Music performed by Bold as Brass Quartet and Derek Scurll (Percussion). Solo singers were Sianed Jones (Soprano), Rebecca Askew & Siân Croose (Alto), Jeremy Avis (Tenor) and Jonathan Baker (Bass).

=== Lost and Found ===
This piece was performed in Norwich City Hall on 6 December 2014.

Music composed by Orlando Gough, Helen Chadwick, Karen Wimhurst, Jonathan Baker and Dave Camlin, Music performed by Adrian Lever (Piano). Sound Design was by Bill Vine, Lighting Design by Tim Tracey, and Lighting by Pip Cotterell. Human Music were Sharon Durant (Soprano), Helen Chadwick (Soprano), Katherine Zeserson & Siân Croose (Alto), Jeremy Avis (Tenor), Dave Camlin & Jonathan Baker (Bass).

=== The Observatory ===
The Observatory was a site-responsive piece presented as part of the Norfolk & Norwich Festival and created as part of a partnership with the Sainsbury Centre for Visual Arts (SCVA) and the University of East Anglia (UEA). The piece explored poetic, scientific, and musical aspects of humankind's relationship with space, centering on themes of weightlessness, distance, fear of the unknown, infinity, and astronomical geometry. The futuristic design of the show was informed by its setting at the SVCA building.

Commissioned by Norfolk & Norwich Festival. Music composed by Orlando Gough, Karen Wimhurst, Siân Croose and Jonathan Baker. Performed at The Sainsbury Centre for Visual Arts on 9th/10th May 2015. Music performed by Joby Burgess (percussion), BJ Cole (pedal steel), Adrian Lever (keyboards), Steve Saunders & Lewis Edney (bass trombones). The Voice Project quintet were Sianed Jones (Soprano), Sharon Durant & Siân Croose (Alto), Greg Tassell (Tenor) and Jonathan Baker (Bass). Lighting design was done by Tim Tracey.

=== Norwich Over the Water (Singing the City) ===
Norwich Over the Water was a promenade outdoor choral piece around the River Wensum and Norwich University of the Arts quad in Norwich's historic centre of the textile and dyeing industries. Taking place on a Saturday afternoon, the piece started at The Octagon Chapel and processed across bridges to a finale in the quad of Norwich University of the Arts.

Part of Vocal Invention 2016. The Voice Project Sextet were Bex Mather & Sharon Durant (Soprano), Katherine Zeserson & Siân Croose (Alto), Dave Camlin & Jonathan Baker (Bass).

=== Red Shift ===
This piece was performed on 23 January 2016 in St. Andrews Hall, Norwich. It was a seated performance and the last show delivered as part of the 'Singing the City' programme. It marked the turning of the year with choral music that took the audience from the dark of winter to the promise of spring, exploring themes of dark and light, hibernation and awakening.

Music composed by Karen Wimhurst, Siân Croose and Jonathan Baker. Music performed by Rowland Sutherland (flutes) and Donna-Maria Landowski (percussion). The Voice Project Quintet were Lisa Cassidy & Sharon Durant (Soprano), Siân Croose (Alto), Jeremy Avis (Tenor), Jonathan Baker (Bass).

=== The Arms of Sleep ===
This co-commission between the Norfolk & Norwich Festival, the Brighton International Festival and the Voice Project was performed six times at the Assembly House in Norwich as part of the 2017 Norfolk & Norwich Festival (20 to 26 May 2017) and four times at Firle Place Riding School (nr. Lewes, Sussex) as part of the 2018 Brighton International Festival (10 to 13 May 2018). Taking the form of an overnight performance, forty audience members joined the choir, soloists and instrumentalists for a ten-hour piece during which time the audience slept, were read to, were woken up for a 2.30am ‘dream sequence’ performance and eventually woken again at 7am for breakfast and a final choral show.

Music composed by Orlando Gough, Jonathan Baker, Helen Chadwick & Jon Hopkins. The Voice Project Quintet were Sianed Jones & Lisa Cassidy (soprano), Siân Croose (Alto), Jeremy Avis (Tenor), Jonathan Baker (Bass).

=== Between Stars ===
This site-responsive piece took place in Norwich Cathedral on 23 January 2017 – making extensive use of the space in a carefully choreographed promenade performance. The seating was removed from the nave to allow the performers to move freely throughout the space and to increase the effect of the lighting design.

Music composed by Jonathan Baker, Orlando Gough, Helen Chadwick and Siân Croose. Music performed by Esther Hopkinson (Violin), Hefin Miles (Violin), John Mudd (Cello), Adrian Lever (Piano), Jeron Gundersen (Percussion). The Voice Project quintet were Lisa Cassidy (Soprano), Rebecca Askew & Siân Croose (Alto), Jeremy Avis (Tenor), Jonathan Baker (Bass).

=== Travels in Light ===
This piece was performed on 20 January 2018 in three churches along Princes Street in Norwich - St. Georges near the junction with Tombland, St. Peter Hungate near the corner of Elm Hill, and the United Reformed Church opposite. It was the third part of the 'Arms of Sleep' trilogy of performances related to sleep, waking and dreaming - following on from Between Stars in January 2017 and The Arms of Sleep in May 2017.

Music composed by Jonathan Baker, Orlando Gough, Rebecca Askew, Siân Croose, Helen Chadwick, Karen Wimhurst. Music performed by Adrian Lever (piano, organ and hammered dulcimer). The Voice Project quintet were Sianed Jones & Lisa Cassidy (Soprano), Siân Croose (Alto), Jeremy Avis (Tenor), Jonathan Baker (Bass). Lighting design was done by Tim Tracey.

=== Timepiece ===
Timepiece was an ambitious project, performed in the cloisters of Norwich Cathedral, involving performances on the hour every hour between midday and midnight on 25 May 2018. It involved four choirs (The Male Boys Choir, Big Sky, Harmonium, The Voice Project Choir), a professional quintet and instrumentalists. It was commissioned by Norfolk & Norwich Festival and was free to the general public.

Music composed by Orlando Gough, Jonathan Baker, Jason Dixon, Erin McDonnell, Siân Croose, Meredith Monk, Helen Chadwick & Jeremy Avis. Music performed by Chris Dowding (Trumpet and Flugelhorn) and Derek Scurll (Percussion). The Voice Project Quintet were Lisa Cassidy (Soprano), Sharon Dunant (Soprano), Siân Croose (Alto), Jeremy Avis (Tenor) and Jon Baker (Bass).

=== The Sky is Full of Light ===
This piece was performed on 22 December 2018 in St. Andrews Hall, Norwich. It was a celebration of the Voice Project's 10th Birthday, and 15 years since its first new commission (Barbara Thompson's "Journey to a Destination Unknown"). The programme included highlights from the past 15 years, plus a first performance of "Everything Is Going To Be Alright" – words by Derek Mahon set to music by Jonathan Baker.

Music composed by Helen Chadwick, Jonathan Baker, Gwilym Simcock, Andy Sheppard, Karen Wimhurst, Orlando Gough and Barbara Thompson. Music performed by Andy Sheppard (Soprano and Alto Saxophone), Adrian Lever (Piano, Organ), Donna-Marie Landowski (Percussion), Iain Lowery (Guitar). The Voice Project Quintet were Lisa Cassidy & Sharon Durant (Soprano), Siân Croose (Alto), Jeremy Avis (Tenor), Jonathan Baker (Bass). Lighting design was done by Tim Tracey.

=== Nocturne (Songs for a Winters Night) ===
This piece was performed on 9 February 2019 in St. Mary's Church, Bungay. For the most part, it was a reprise of The Sky is Full of Light, with some changes due to the unavailability of Andy Sheppard. It was performed in candlelight to a full house.

Music composed by Helen Chadwick, Jonathan Baker, Karen Wimhurst, Orlando Gough and Barbara Thompson. Music performed by Adrian Lever (Piano, Organ). The Voice Project Quartet were Lisa Cassidy (Soprano), Siân Croose (Alto), Jeremy Avis (Tenor), Jonathan Baker (Bass). Lighting design was done by Tim Tracey.

=== I Reach Right Up to the Sun ===
This piece was performed on 6 July 2019 at Houghton Hall. It was a promenade performance in the grounds of the Palladian house built in the 1720s for Britain's first Prime Minister, at a time when they were hosting a year-long exhibition (Nature and Inspiration) of works by Henry Moore, James Turrell (the Skyspace), Richard Long (the Earth Sky pieces) and Rachel Whiteread.

Music composed by Helen Chadwick, Jonathan Baker, Karen Wimhurst and Jonathan Baker. The Voice Project Quartet were Lisa Cassidy & Sianed Jones (Soprano), Siân Croose (Alto), Jeremy Avis (Tenor), Jonathan Baker (Bass). The Voice Project Choir was conducted by Siân Croose.

=== And is This a Dream? ===
This is the first project to be developed with both the Norwich and Brighton choirs concurrently, in Autumn 2019. It was performed on 16 November 2019 at All Saints Church in Hove and 30 November 2019 at St. Mary's Works in Norwich. The two venues were quite different in nature - All Saints being a late Victorian gothic revival building that had been the parish church of Hove since 1892 and St. Mary's Works being a former shoe factory which has been empty since 1972 but is the subject of ambitious development plans.

There were sixteen songs, each one of which depicted a dreamscape. The audience were taken on a journey through buildings that have been inhabited by others for over a century, evoking the half-lit, liminal world of dreaming. The title ‘…And is This a Dream?’ is inspired by The Birds of East London by the poet Stephen Watts, a long-term Voice Project collaborator.

Music composed by Helen Chadwick, Orlando Gough and Jonathan Baker. Music performed by Adrian Lever (Piano, Hammered Dulcimer) and Steve Morgan (Vibraphone - only in Hove). The Voice Project Quintet were Lisa Cassidy & Sianed Jones (Soprano), Siân Croose (Alto), Jeremy Avis (Tenor) and Jonathan Baker (Bass). Lighting design was done by Nathan Clarke.

=== Arc of the Sky (Film) ===
Plans to develop a new show for Spring/Summer 2020, inspired by the idea of a bird's-eye view of Holy Trinity Church in Blythburgh, had to be adapted as a result of the Covid-19 pandemic. The original intention had been to perform in the Church (known as the Cathedral of the Marshes) in July 2020. Since singing together in person was impossible, the project was re-designed as a film that was premiered on 2 October at St. Mary's Works in Norwich. The film explores themes of flight, perspective, scale, solitude and connection; and was made by filmmaker Nathan Clarke, with Art Direction from Sal Pittman, including footage contributed by choir members over the course of the project. A prologue to the film was also produced, consisting of images contributed by the choir and instrumental versions of some of the songs.

Music composed by Jon Baker, Orlando Gough and Sian Croose. Based on texts written by British and American poets including Esther Morgan, Emily Dickson, Steven Watts, Wendell Berry, Jane Draycott and George Szirtes. The Voice Project Quintet were Lisa Cassidy & Sianed Jones (Soprano), Siân Croose (Alto), Jeremy Avis (Tenor) and Jonathan Baker (Bass). Music performed by Adrian Lever (Piano, Hammered Dulcimer) and Caroline Bishop (Violin).

=== The Distance Between Us (Film) ===
With Covid-19 restrictions still in place in Autumn / Winter 2020, a fully-online project called 'The Distance Between Us' was conceived. This was the second instalment of the trilogy that started with Arc of the Sky. As with Arc of the Sky, a film was made by Nathan Clarke, with art direction from Sal Pittman. Esther Morgan ran creative writing sessions and dancer and choreographer Dane Hurst ran movement sessions. The film was premiered at Norwich Arts Centre on 27 October 2021, before being made available on YouTube.

Music composed by Jonathan Baker, Sian Croose and Orlando Gough.

The film won the 'Best Experimental Music Short' aware at the 2022 Richmond International Film Festival and was selected as a January 2022 finalist in the Extra Long Short category of the New York Flash Film Festival.

=== The Recording Choir (CD) ===
In Autumn 2021, it was still not appropriate for choirs to rehearse in person. Instead, the choir continued to meet online, and a CD was created of some of the highlights of recent years.

=== Arc of the Sky (Live) ===
With the relaxation of Covid-19 restrictions in Spring 2022, it was possible to plan to perform Arc of the Sky, as per the original intent. It was performed on 11 June 2022 at St. Andrew's Church, Alfriston (Sussex) and 2 July 2022 at Holy Trinity Church, Blythburgh (Suffolk).

Music composed by Jonathan Baker, Orlando Gough and Sian Croose. Based on texts written by British and American poets including Esther Morgan, Emily Dickson, Steven Watts, Wendell Berry, Jane Draycott and George Szirtes. The Voice Project Quintet were Lisa Cassidy & Sharon Dunant (Soprano), Siân Croose (Alto), Jeremy Avis (Tenor) and Jonathan Baker (Bass). Music performed by Adrian Lever (Piano, Hammered Dulcimer) and Rowland Sutherland (Flute, Piccolo).

=== The Distance Between Us (Live) ===
Performed on 28 January 2023 at St. Andrew’s Hall, Norwich and 11 February 2023 at St. George’s Church, Kemptown (Brighton).

Music composed by Jonathan Baker, Orlando Gough and Sian Croose. The Voice Project quintet were Lisa Cassidy (Soprano), Sharon Dunant (Soprano), Siân Croose (Alto), Jeremy Avis (Tenor) and Jonathan Baker (Bass). Music performed by Adrian Lever (piano, hammered dulcimer), Rowland Sutherland (Flute, Piccolo) and Owen Gunnell (percussionist).

=== Arc of the Sun ===
Performed on 15 July 2023 at St. Peter and St. Paul church, Salle.

Music composed by Jonathan Baker, Sian Croose, Orlando Gough. The Voice Project quintet were Lisa Cassidy (Soprano), Sharon Dunant (Soprano), Siân Croose (Alto), Jeremy Avis (Tenor) and Jonathan Baker (Bass). Music performed by Adrian Lever (piano, hammered dulcimer) and Rowland Sutherland (Flute, Piccolo).

=== The Lie of the Land ===
Performed on 13 & 14 July 2024 at Houghton Hall. This was a promenade performance to complement Antony Gormley's Time Horizon installation.

Music composed by Jonathan Baker, Sian Croose, Orlando Gough. The Voice Project quintet were Lisa Cassidy (Soprano), Sharon Dunant (Soprano), Siân Croose (Alto), Jeremy Avis (Tenor) and Jonathan Baker (Bass). Music performed by Adrian Lever (piano, hammered dulcimer).

== Arts Council support ==
The Voice Project received two grants from Arts Council England's Cultural Recovery Fund during the Covid-19 pandemic to enable it to carry on running projects and courses.
