= Terry O'Connor (musician) =

Irish musician

- Born: Mary Teresa O'Connor; 14 October 1897; Johnstown, Waterford, Ireland
- Died: 15 September 1983 (aged 85); Our Lady's Hospice, Harold's Cross, Dublin

Terry O'Connor (14 October 1897 – 15 September 1983) was an Irish musician and music teacher, deputy conductor of the orchestra at 2RN, co-founder of the Dublin String Orchestra and professor of orchestra at the Royal Irish Academy of Music.

== Early life and family ==
Terry O'Connor was born Mary Teresa O'Connor in Johnstown, Waterford. She was the second eldest daughter of at least four of grocer and vintner James O'Connor and Brigid (née Keirsey). She attended the Ursuline Convent, Waterford, and Loreto College, St Stephen's Green, Dublin. She went on to study violin at the Royal Irish Academy of Music (RIAM). She started as a full-time cinema musician, performing in a string quartet with Arthur Darley, George H. Brett and Joseph Schofield at the 1922 Irish Race Convention in Paris in works by Swan Hennessy and Henri Bast and also appeared in concerts at the Salle Gaveau. After the launch of the Irish national broadcasting service, 2RN, in January 1926, O'Connor was recruited as violinist and leader to the station's emerging "orchestra" which developed out of Clery's Instrumental Trio. Her sister played viola in this ensemble. On 4 December 1928 O'Connor married David Glasgow (died 1960), an engineer. They had one daughter and one son. She kept her maiden name as her stage name and survived a number of attempts to force her resignation due to her marriage as most civil service appointments were subject to a marriage bar.

== Career ==
O'Connor remained as the orchestra leader after the reconstitution of 2RN into Radio Éireann in 1937 as well as through its expansion and development with the orchestra growing to 40 musicians by 1942. On 26 November 1927, O'Connor led the orchestra at its first public symphony concert at the Metropolitan Hall, Lower Abbey Street, conducted by Vincent O'Brien. She withstood the orchestra suffering from lack of musicians, being supplemented by army and cinema musicians, and propensity of fellow musicians to leave the studio to go to a public house and not reliably return.{cn} She worked closely with Michael Bowles on a successful series of fortnightly public symphony concerts beginning in 1941, at first in the round room of the Mansion House, and from 1943 in the Capitol Theatre, Prince's Street, in which O'Connor regularly featured as soloist. In 1938, she co-founded the Dublin String Orchestra, which she frequently conducted, and performed works by a wide range of contemporary composers including Brian Boydell, Arthur Duff, John Francis Larchet and Frederick May. She also conducted the orchestra on recordings with Margaret Burke Sheridan in the 1940s.

O'Connor resigned from Radio Éireann in 1945 and began teaching and conducting free-lance. She was a licentiate of the Royal Academy of Music and Trinity College of Music, London. From 1948 she was professor of orchestra at the RIAM and at the College of Music, Dublin, from 1954 to 1964. She was a member of the board of examiners, Department of Education, and served on the council of the Royal Dublin Society. She conducted the Culwick Choral Society. O'Connor was the musical director and regularly conducted the Glasnevin, and the Rathmines and Rathgar musical societies, along with other local groups. She toured the United States twice in 1955 and 1963. She contributed the essay "The String Player in Ireland" for the symposium Music in Ireland (1952), edited by Aloys Fleischmann. She won gold medals for violin, piano, and singing at the Feis Ceoil, and served as an examiner at feiseanna across Ireland, sitting on the Feis Ceoil executive and music committee, with a trophy named in her honour awarded annually.

O'Connor died at Our Lady's Hospice, Harold's Cross, Dublin, and is buried in Deans Grange Cemetery.
