= Arthur Warren Darley =

Arthur Warren Darley (19 June 1873 – 19 December 1929) was an Irish violinist, folksong collector, music teacher, and adjudicator as well as a traditional music archivist. As a violinist (or "fiddler") he was equally at home in classical music as in the traditional music of Ireland.

== Life ==
Arthur Warren Darley was born in Dún Laoghaire and first lived on Silchester Road, Glasthule. He was a grandnephew of poet George Darley. His father Henry Warren Darley had converted to Catholicism. His family was musical both in traditional and classical. His grandfather played the uilleann pipes and fiddle, and his father played fiddle and viola.

Darley began learning the violin at age 8 and studied at the Royal Irish Academy of Music (RIAM), becoming a teacher there while still studying, initially assisting his teacher Adolf Wilhelmj (son of August Wilhelmj). He was appointed senior professor at the RIAM, 1900–1903. Later he was a fellow in the College of Violinists, London, a professor at the Leinster School of Music & Drama, in August 1928 became the first director of the Municipal School of Music, Dublin.

He was the founder and leader of the Dublin String Quartet, which also included Terry O'Connor (2nd violin), George H. Brett (viola), and Joseph Schofield (cello). Among many notable performances, they also gave the first performance of Swan Hennessy's String Quartet No. 2, Op. 49 (1920), dedicated to Terence MacSwiney, in Paris, 25 January 1922, at the "World Congress of the Irish Race" in the presence of many noted Irish politicians and Civil War opponents.

Darley was also a church organist who spent some time as a Church of Ireland organist near Bruckless, County Donegal, where he spent some time with the great Donegal fiddler, John Doherty. His son Arthur Darley Jnr was a guitarist who featured on some early recordings of Irish music.

Darley was president of the Irish Music Club and a co-founder of the Feis Ceoil Association and the Father Mathew Feis. The Arthur Darley Memorial Prize of the Feis Ceoil is awarded to violinists at the annual music festival. He also founded the orchestra of Ceól Cumann, which had regular broadcasts on Radio Éireann between 1926 and 1969.

== Folksong collector ==
Besides his career as a classical violinist, Darley had a lifelong interest in the traditional music of Ireland. He met Patrick Joseph McCall, a collector of traditional music who spent much of his time in Wexford. Together they collected old tunes that were published in 1914 by the Feis Ceoil Association.

McCall assembled the famous Wexford Ballads, and Arthur Darley helped put Irish airs to them, with tunes including "The Boys of Wexford", "Boolavogue" and "Kelly the Boy from Killanne".

Darley supported the nationalist cause in the War of Independence, and his home, Bruckless House, provided shelter for republican leaders. Seán T. O'Kelly who would become Ireland's second president wrote on his death in The Nation about his contribution to Ireland and Irish music. As a result of his involvement in the Irish war of independence – he performed at many Easter 1916 commemorations in the Theatre Royal – an obituary for Darley featured in the Republican newspaper An Phoblacht in 1930. An obituary also featured in The Musical Times in February 1930.

== Legacy ==
The English poet Leonard Strong wrote a poem about Arthur Darley.

Darley's likeness was captured in a portrait by Irish artist Estella Solomons in 1926 and in a caricature by Grace Gifford also in 1926.

Samuel Beckett's poem "Mort de A.D." was written in memory of his friend Dr Arthur Darley, the son of Arthur Warren Darley, who had been with in him during World War II at Saint-Lô .

The library of Trinity College Dublin has an archive of Arthur Darley's personal and family-related papers.

== Selected folksong arrangements ==
- "The Boys of Wexford" by Darley & McCall
- "Boolavogue" by Darley & McCall
- "Kelly the Boy from Killanne" by Darley & McCall
- "Drocketty's March" by Darley & McCall
- "Lady and the Farmer" by Darley & McCall
- "Bruckless Shore" his name for the "Swedish Jig"/"Arthur Darley's Jig"
- "Cloch na Ceithre Mhile (The Four Mile Stone)" by Arthur Darley

== Publications ==
The Feis Ceoil Collection of Irish Airs, ed. Arthur Darley & P. J. McCall (Dublin: Feis Ceoil, 1914; reprint as The Darley & McCall Collection of Traditional Irish Music (Cork: Ossian Publications, 1984).
