= Helen Chadwick (musician) =

British composer and singer

Helen Chadwick is a British composer and singer who has written over 300 songs, mainly for unaccompanied voices. She has ten albums and creates song theatre performances, both solo and with her group. As a singer she has worked with Meredith Monk, Orlando Gough and for the Royal National Theatre.

Helen's recordings to 2005 are included in the Women's Revolutions Per Minute (WRPM) Collection and Archive at Goldsmiths University of London Special Collections.

In 2008 she created, composed and sung in two productions commissioned by the Royal Opera House: Dalston Songs, based on interviews with her neighbours on the theme of home, in collaboration with choreographer Steven Hoggett, and The Singing Circle, featuring the massed voices of several choirs, and choreography by Liam Steel. In 2014 she created War Correspondents, based on interviews with frontline journalists; on this show she again collaborated with Steven Hoggett.

Helen composed music for a sound installation at Wollaton Hall, Nottingham, which won the East Midlands Heritage Award (Judges Special Prize) in 2017.

In 2002, in collaboration with the Thames Festival, Helen co-founded the mass singing charity project Sing For Water. As of 2019 it has raised 1 million pounds for WaterAid.

Helen is a long-time member of the Magdalena Project, an international network of women in contemporary theatre and performance, and performs regularly at Magdalena festivals around the world.
