= Samuel Myerscough =

Samuel Myerscough (1854–1932), was an English organist, teacher and examiner. He was a Fellow of the Royal College of Organists and a Fellow of Trinity College London.

Myerscough was born in 1854 in Salford, Lancashire. A gifted musician, he was awarded the Royal College of Organists Medal in 1873. He graduated with a Bachelor of Music from Hertford College, Oxford in October 1881.

He was appointed as assistant organist at Manchester Cathedral and the family moved there. He was a convert to Catholicism in 1899, accepted into the church by Fr. Bernard Vaughan S.J., gave up his job at the Cathedral and moved to Dublin, where he taught music in Loreto Abbey, Rathfarnham. In 1904 Myerscough founded the Leinster School of Music & Drama in Dublin, now part of Griffith College. The Musical Herald wrote at length of his prominence in Irish musical life:

The work by which Mr. Myerscough will be best remembered is the Leinster School of Music of which he was the founder and inspiring force. .... Pupils came from as far north as Enniskillen, southwards from Waterford, and across from Galway.

He is listed as a member The Musical Association as "Myerscough, S., Esq., B.Mns. Oxon., F.R.C.O. (Liverpool)". He died on 28 March 1932 aged 78 years and is buried in Deans Grange Cemetery, Co Dublin.

== Family ==
His son Samuel Sebastian Myerscough (1879-1954), also a gifted musician, attained a Bachelor of Music at Oxford. He became a Jesuit Priest, training at Oscott College Birmingham. His daughter Alice Myerscough was also music teacher. The Myerscough family lived in 3 Fontenoy Terrace, Bray, Co Wicklow.
