= KlangHaus =

British artistic partnership

KlangHaus is a British artistic partnership formed in 2008 between Sal Pittman (artist and filmmaker) and the Neutrinos (musicians / sound artists).

== Members ==
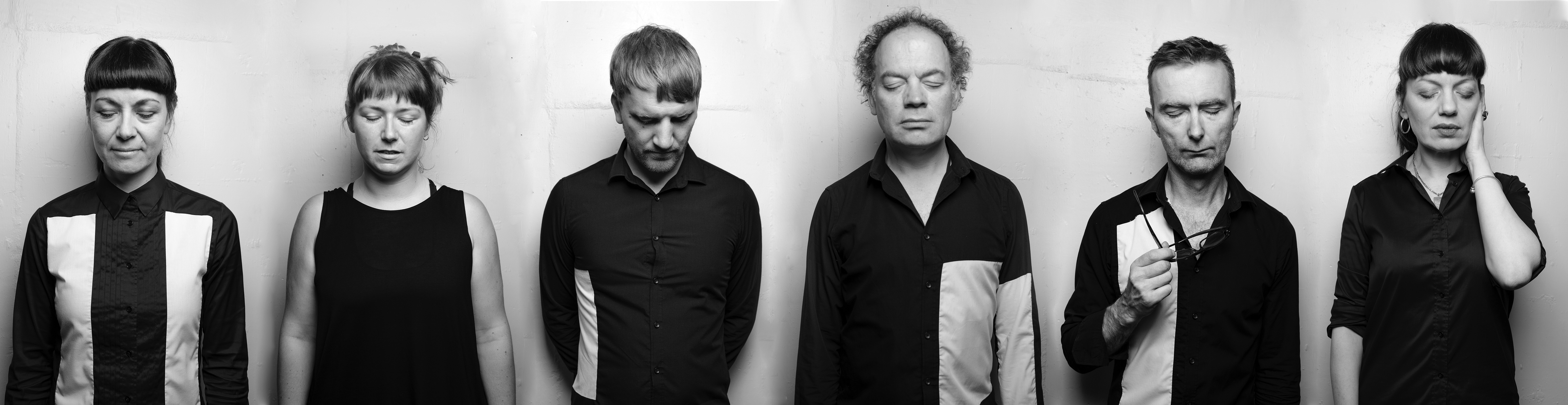
Karen Reilly, Alex Lingford (Production Manager), Jeron Gundersen, Jon Baker, Mark Howe, Sal Pittman

- Sal Pittman - artist and filmmaker.
- Mark Howe - guitarist, vocals, host.
- Karen Reilly - vocals, movement and saw playing.
- Jon Baker - vocals, multi-instrumentalist, sound designer.
- Jeron Gundersen - percussion.

== Performances ==
Year	Project	Location
2008	Butcher of Common Sense	Berlin, Funkhaus
2012	Butcher of Common Sense	London, The Horse Hospital
2013	Stories from the Basement	Norfolk & Norwich Festival
2014	KlangHaus	Edinburgh Fringe, Summerhall (The Small Animal Hospital)
2015	Lower Ground	London, Somerset House
2016	On Air	London, Southbank Centre
2016	Alight Here	Colchester, Bus Depot
2016	Four Storeys	Norwich, St. George's Works
2017	800 Breaths	London, Royal Festival Hall
2018	Concrete Dreams	London, Southbank Centre
2020	Floodlight	Norwich, Love Light Festival
2021	Darkroom	Glasgow, COP26 Norwich, Tyndall Centre for Climate Change Research
2022	LightHaus	Norwich, Love Light Festival
2022	InHaus	Norwich, KlangHaus HQ
2023	InHaus & Darkroom	Edinburgh Fringe, Summerhall (Lower Church) Norwich, KlangHaus HQ

== Major projects ==
Many of Klanghaus' early projects were responses to the buildings and architecture in which they were staged. The company has developed a form of immersive promenade theatre that responds to the buildings - original experimental songs, films and narratives are derived from complex research of each new space drawing on the architecture, psychogeography and history alongside evolving concepts embracing climate, community and human-centred themes.

KlangHaus shows are bespoke presentations. A consistent feature across all projects is the lack of a stage or any other separation between audience and performers.

=== Butcher of Common Sense ===
Developed over a three year period, The Butcher of Common Sense began with ten days in a then-defunct Berlin radio station (Funkhaus Berlin) in 2008. It was a collaboration between The Neutrinos, Jonny Cole, Sal Pittman, BK and Dad, Roz Colman and Dan Tombs, with later additions from Jason Dixon, Dan Richards and Jay Barsby.

From the collaboration, a 10" vinyl, CD album and 340 pp. artbook were produced as a signed edition of 150 alongside an exhibition with the following embedded performances in 2012:

- The Horse Hospital (London)
- The Undercroft Gallery (Norwich)

The Butcher of Common Sense led The Neutrinos and Sal Pittman to create KlangHaus.

In 2013 KlangHaus returned to Berlin to promote the artbook in bookshops and art galleries. During the trip they met with Gerhard Steinke, who worked closely with sound engineers, sound designers (Tonmeisters) and production artists at the Funkhaus Berlin Nalepastrasse.

In 2015, the project featured in a book by Dan Richards about the work of some British artists.

=== KlangHaus ===
The first public iteration of the KlangHaus format was a promenade gig through a multiple- roomed small animal hospital - an ex-University of Edinburgh veterinary school in Summerhall drawing upon the ghosts and history of the building, the acoustics and the architecture, performing multiple shows a day for small audiences. Encouraged to be part of the Edinburgh Fringe 2014 by Norwich Arts Centre's Director, Pasco-Q Kevlin, this model of working proved viable and engaging. Show concept was inspired by consciousness and anaesthesia, confinement and freedom.

The show contained 12 songs by The Neutrinos including Song of the Small Animals, Mother’s Mother Tongue and Brothers In Milk and a series of films, animations and hand-crafted super-graphic slide projected installations by Sal Pittman.

KlangHaus 2014 was a 42-show residency.

=== On Air ===
Devised and performed during July 2016 as part of the Southbank Centre's "Festival of Love", On Air resided in the roof space of the Royal Festival Hall. The show took over the normally restricted plant rooms, specifically Plant Room 74 which housed the original air circulation and ventilation machinery. The promenade performance took the audience through the whole of the Hall’s ceiling space concluding with the show’s exit onto the roof itself.

KlangHaus OnAir was a 41-show residency.

=== Alight Here ===
Created in September 2016, Alight Here occupied a former bus depot in Queen Street, Colchester - a high-roofed garage with maintenance facilities including a bus washing area, inspection pits and suspended air lines. The show took place in the inspection pit, in and around a working Routemaster bus and in corners of the garage. Moving and still images were projected within the garage and surrounding corridors as well as multiple and still images in the office-space settings.

KlangHaus Alight Here was a 7 show residency.

=== Four Storeys ===
Four Storeys was devised and performed in December 2016 in a former furniture depository in Muspole Street, Norwich (also known as St. George's Works); a four storey building which had been empty for eight years.

The show’s themes derived from a sense of place and displacement - and the meaning of home. The audience were free to roam through the high-ceilinged spaces, in which light and film accompanied site responsive installations. Birch tree trunks were installed upright in a half-height room to create a forest. Furniture, given the appearance of having been sunk through the floor, was positioned throughout multiple rooms alongside scale-play and illusion in interior offices and a heated piano store.

Four Storeys was an 7 show residency.

=== 800 Breaths ===
800 Breaths at the Royal Festival Hall in June / July 2017 was supported by the PRS Foundation. A new show written for Plant Room 74, 800 human breaths was the average length of the show. The concept underpinned the content which included researching assisted breathing and artificial life while paying reference to the building's air circulation system which were the machines housed in the performance space. The audience left the show walking across the roof, this time into a bespoke 800 Breaths garden.

The show contained 12 songs by The Neutrinos including, Graphene Queen, Pulse Addict, and Who’s Counting and a film series derived from the show research including found footage of physics experimentation on electricity, soundwaves, flight simulators and breathing apparatus alongside super-graphic slide projection installation works.

800 Breaths was a 42 show residency.

=== Concrete Dreams ===
In April 2018, KlangHaus were engaged as exhibition designers for the re-opening of the brutalist parts of the Southbank Centre (the Queen Elizabeth Hall, Purcell Room and Hayward Gallery), after a major refurbishment. They had access to archive materials related to the centre, going back to its opening in 1967 and curated a one hour tour designed for an audience of 15.

The audience was guided through dressing rooms, bathrooms and other backstage areas where films of notable shows were projected and programmes, set-lists, details of performances and ticket sales and the original plans for the centre were displayed. The tour ended with a performance in the Purcell Room, combining footage of dance, music and poetry on two translucent, auditorium width screens by Sal Pittman with live performance from a Kathak dancer over the seating area whilst the audience sat onstage. The dancer's finale was a spin onstage that the audience could feel through the stage.

The multiple daily tours ran for 20 days from April 10th-29th 2018.

=== Floodlight and LightHaus ===
Floodlight and LightHaus were both developed for the Love Light festival in Norwich. Floodlight was performed in February 2020 at The Halls, using the cloisters and undercroft, and supported by Vital Spark - a choir of male voices. LightHaus, a show with climate themes, was performed in February 2022 at the Blake Studio, Norwich School. The audience walked into an 4m x 6m illuminated box of saturated colour and haze with sound design around the outside of the box. Once inside the box the audience could only see and experience coloured light and sounds. A falling reveal-wall of the illuminated box fell in the finale to unveil a live band, The Neutrinos, playing loudly. This was the first project specifically designed for a family audience.

Floodlight was a 3 show residency February 15th 2020.

LightHaus was a 24 show residency across three days February 17th-19th 2022.

=== Darkroom ===
The work was developed in collaboration with the Tyndall Centre for Climate Change Research and the Barn Arts Centre in Aberdeenshire as a response to climate change, Darkroom is a sound installation, delivered live to an audience of one in complete darkness.

Darkroom was trialled at the Tyndall Centre in September 2021, before taking it to COP26 Glasgow in November 2021. It was rewritten and updated for performance at the Edinburgh Fringe in August 2023 (Summerhall, Lower Church Basement).

Attention given to the pre-show and after-show ‘care’ enabled the team to create a sonically extreme experience.

Darkroom won the 'Keep It Fringe Fund' 2023, championed by Phoebe Waller-Bridge.

=== InHaus ===
InHaus was devised for an intimate, domestic setting as if it were the last remaining house on earth. Trialled in the KlangHaus members’ house in Norwich city centre Dec 2022, It was performed in August 2023 as part of the Edinburgh Fringe at Summerhall, Lower Church, designed to look like a maximalist living room, and was described as a cross between a rock concert, house party and an art installation.

The show contained 12 songs by The Neutrinos including, You Can’t Hum Your Way Out of This One, Ghost and Love is in the Bullet and a film series made to maximise spatial and scale perception within vignette site responsive installations by Sal Pittman.

InHaus Edinburgh Fringe 2023 was a 39 show residency.

== Awards ==
Klanghaus won a Three Weeks award in Edinburgh in 2014 and a Norfolk Arts Award for Music in 2017.
