= Culwick Choral Society =

Amateur choir in Dublin

Culwick Choral Society is an amateur choir in Dublin, founded in 1898 by the English born, musician and choirmaster Dr. James Cooksey Culwick. Following Dr. Culwicks death in 1907 his daughter Florence Culwick reestablished the choir, becoming its director. The society celebrated its centenary in 1998. The choir presents a number of concerts each year such as the Christmas Concert (A Culwick Christmas), and Messiah Concert, performing regularly in venues such as the National Concert Hall, and St Patrick's Cathedral, Dublin. Bernie Sherlock was appointed musical director of the society in 2007. In 2025 Kevin Boushel became musical director of the society.
