= Leinster School of Music & Drama =

Drama school in Dublin, Ireland; part of Griffith College

- Motto: Gan Ceol Gan Tir (Without Music Without Country)
- Established: 1904
- Address: Griffith Campus; South Circular Rd. Dublin 8, Dublin, Ireland
- Website: https://www.griffith.ie/faculties/leinster-school-music-drama

The Leinster School of Music & Drama, in Dublin, Ireland, provides tuition and examinations in music and drama throughout Ireland.

"She beckoned to him with her finger like one preparing a certificate in pianoforte...at the Leinster School of Music." (Samuel Beckett)

== History ==
The school was founded in 1904 by Samuel Myerscough (1854–1932), a well-respected musician, teacher, and examiner. Even in the school's infancy, students travelled to it from all parts of Ireland. In 1909 The Musical Herald wrote at length of Myerscough's prominence in Irish musical life:

"The work by which Mr. Myerscough will be best remembered is the Leinster School of Music, of which he is the founder and inspiring force. .... Pupils came from as far north as Enniskillen, southwards from Waterford, and across from Galway."

In December 1941, the Irish Department of Education recognised the School's Teacher's Music Diploma as a qualification for teaching in secondary schools.

According to the Irish Art Handbook of 1949, the school had "become one of the most important influences on the musical life of the country as a teaching, examining body."

The school's original teaching staff included Madame Quinton Rosse, Madame Coslett Heller, and the piano tutors Patricia Read and May Cosgrave, a sister of W. T. Cosgrave. Professor Patrick Joseph Griffith, a notable fiddle/violin player and teacher, and a collector of Irish Music, was a Director and Professor at the school during its early years, teaching Violin and Viola.

Arthur Warren Darley (1873–1929), a composer who put music to some famous Irish ballads (including "The Boys of Wexford", "Boolavogue" and "Kelly the Boy from Killanne") was also a professor at the school.

== Location ==
The Leinster School's original location on Harcourt Street, Dublin, was followed by a move to Upper Stephen Street in 1982. In 1998 the school moved to the Griffith College Dublin campus on the South Circular Road where it is a constituent school of the college.

== Examinations ==
As a national examining body, the school offers grade and diploma examinations in both music and drama. Approximately 1,000 teachers nationwide are teaching the school's various syllabuses and preparing students for Leinster School examinations throughout the year. Approximately 14,000 candidates are examined annually.

=== Leinster School of Music & Drama "Excellence Awards" ===
The Leinster School of Music & Drama launched the annual 'Excellence Awards' in 2004 to mark the school's centenary year. These awards are made to students who are deemed to have given outstanding performances in the school's Annual Examinations. The 2010 Excellence Awards Concert took place on 28 October 2010, in the Auditorium in Griffith College Conference Centre.

== LSMD Associate, Licentiate and Fellowship Diplomas ==
The LSMD conducts written and practical examinations for the Associate and for the teaching diplomas the Licentiate and the Fellowship Diplomas which are normally held at the Leinster School of Music and Drama (LSMD) in June and December each year. The Associate Diploma is not recognised by the Leinster School as a Teaching Qualification. Only Licentiate and Fellowship graduates of the Leinster School are entitled to use the letters LLSMD and FLSMD after their names. Honorary Fellowships (FLSMD (Hon)) are awarded to those teachers or performers who have distinguished themselves in their chosen fields. Among the Honorary Fellows of the school are the poet and novelist Prof. Brendan Kennelly and the theatre director Anna Scher.

== Higher Diplomas (HETAC) ==
In recent years the school has harmonised a number of its Teacher training programmes to fit in with the National Framework of Qualifications. with HETAC validated higher diplomas and certificates.

=== Higher Diploma in Arts in Drama education ===
Following on from the Music Education H.Dip, commencing in 2010 the Leinster School will offer a HETAC validated Level 8, Higher Diploma in Arts in Drama Education. Similar to the Music programmes, students will be able to do modules from the Higher Diploma, in the form of a Certificate in Drama Teaching (HETAC 40 Credits), also attaining a Licentiate of The Leinster School of Music & Drama (LLSMD) and a Certificate in Drama Performance (HETAC 20 Credits) also attaining an Associate of The Leinster School of Music & Drama (ALSMD).

== Graduation ==
Graduation for higher qualifications from the Leinster School of Music & Drama are conducted each November in conjunction with the Griffith College graduation ceremony. Prizes are awarded for the best academic achievement for the Associate Diploma and Licentiate Diploma.

- Associate Diploma (Performers) (ALSMD)
- Licentiate Diploma (Teachers) (LLSMD)
- Certificate in Proficiency in Teaching Piano (LSMD)
- Professional Music Diploma (Teachers) (LLSMD)

== Leinster School of Music Orchestra ==
The Leinster School of Music Orchestra was formed in 1998 by musicians of the school. They give recitals and concerts throughout the year

== People associated with the school ==
The school is known for some of its musical instrument and vocal coaches such as Dr Veronica Dunne Irish & International Soprano & teacher Kathryn Smith. Bernadette Garvey, Evelyn Dowling and Mabel Swainson. A number of distinguished figures in Irish music have studied at the Leinster School of Music, Rhoda Coghill Anthony Kearns, Sarah O'Kennedy(Anúna), Emma Kate Tobia, Patrick McBeth, David Quigley, Anne Buckley, Cecilia Redmond to name but a few.

Some more recent students of the LSMD include TV personality and MTV Presenter Laura Whitmore and Niall Kinsella, finalist on the Ireland's Got Talent TV programme.
