= Astrid Alben =

British poet

- Born: Astrid Reijna van Baalen
- Occupations: Poet, editor, translator
- Years active: 2007 - present
- Website: www.astridalben.com

Astrid Alben is a Dutch-born British poet, editor, experimental writer, and translator. She is the author of several poetry collections, and her poems have been translated into several languages, including Chinese, Maltese, Slovene and Romanian. Alben often appears at literary festivals throughout Europe, including the Malta Mediterranean Literature Festival.

Between 2002 and 2018, Alben was the co-founder and artistic director of the arts and sciences initiative PARS (Atlas of Creative Thinking). In this, she curated site-specific events that combined theatre, art installations and scientific experiments, using spaces such as the Serpentine Galleries and Central Saint Martins in London, as well as the Rijksakademie van beeldende kunsten in Amsterdam. She was elected chair of Poetry London magazine in 2021 and is Commissioning Editor for Literature in Translation for Prototype Publishing.

== Biography ==
Alben was born in Loosdrecht, the Netherlands, and was raised in Lagos, Nigeria, and Hawkhurst, Kent, where she attended Cranbrook Grammar School. Abandoning a law degree at Leiden University, she switched to English literature and philosophy at Edinburgh University. She divides her time between London and Amsterdam and is married to the British poet Philip Hancock.

== Works ==
Alben is the author of four collections of poetry, focusing on Dutch and English. Ai! Ai! Pianissimo appeared in 2011, Plainspeak in 2019, and Little Dead Rabbit in 2022, a collection she self-translated into Dutch and published with PoëzieCentrum in 2021 as Klein dood Konjin; there were further translations through small press outlets Broken Sleep and Arc.

Alben translated the collected works of Dutch poet F. van Dixhoorn into English: the translations were published by Broken Sleep Books in 2024. Poet Jane Draycott described her translations as “opening up with skilled attentiveness the shapes and choreography of van Dixhoorn's unique imaginative landscapes”. In 2022, Alben translated Island mountain glacier by Anne Vegter, by Prototype Publishing. This associated her with Vegter, the first female poet to hold the position of ‘Dichter des Vaderlands’ (Dutch Poet Laureate). .The collection includes drawings from Vegter

To date, Alben’s choices of which Dutch authors to translate into English have featured poets who display engagement with an experimentally playful and intelligently absurd Europeanism, choices that sit understandably well within her own growing reputation as a poet interested in innovative literary collaborations and whose own creative output consistently displays the characteristics of being “unpredictable, elegant and wholly original.” As an editor, she also curated the anthology series Findings on... and curates site-specific events combining theatre, art installations, and scientific experiments. Her poems, reviews, and essays have been featured in many outlets, including The Times Literary Supplement (on themes such as Brexit), Granta and Poetry Review. Her poetic approach is novel and experimental, often involving unpunctuated stream of consciousness writing that is "supple and precise".

=== Books ===
- 2011: Alben, Astrid (2011). Ai ! Ai ! pianissimo. Todmorden, England: Arc. ISBN 978-1-906570-73-6.
- 2019: Plainspeak. Prototype.
- 2021: Klein dood konijn (in Dutch). poëziecentrum.
- 2022: Little Dead Rabbit.

=== Anthologies ===
- 2007: Aardse, Hester; Baalen, Astrid van; Foundation, Pars (2016-03-22). Findings on Ice. Pars Foundation. ISBN 978-3-03778-125-8.
- 2010: Aardse, Hester; Baalen, Astrid van (2016-03-22). Findings on Elasticity. Pars Foundation. ISBN 978-3-03778-148-7.
- 2016: Alben, Astrid; Aardse, Hester (2016-05-31). Findings on Light. Lars Muller Publishers. ISBN 978-3-03778-490-7.

=== Translations ===
- 2022: Island mountain glacier.

== Awards ==
Her translation of Island mountain glacier (Dutch: Eiland berg gletsjer) by Anne Vegter won an English PEN Translates Award in 2021. She is a fellow of the Royal Society of Arts.

== Critical reception ==
Plainspeak was described by SPAMzine as reclaiming "the radical possibility of re-inventing ourselves through new and surprising language, which, she shows us, can be done just by speaking in the clearest, plainest form." Little Dead Rabbit, a collaboration with graphic designer Zigmunds Lapsa, was described as "an innovative combination of concrete poetry and abstract handmade die cuts."
