= Chapel Royal, Dublin =

Church within Dublin Castle, Ireland

The Chapel Royal
- An Seipeal Rioga
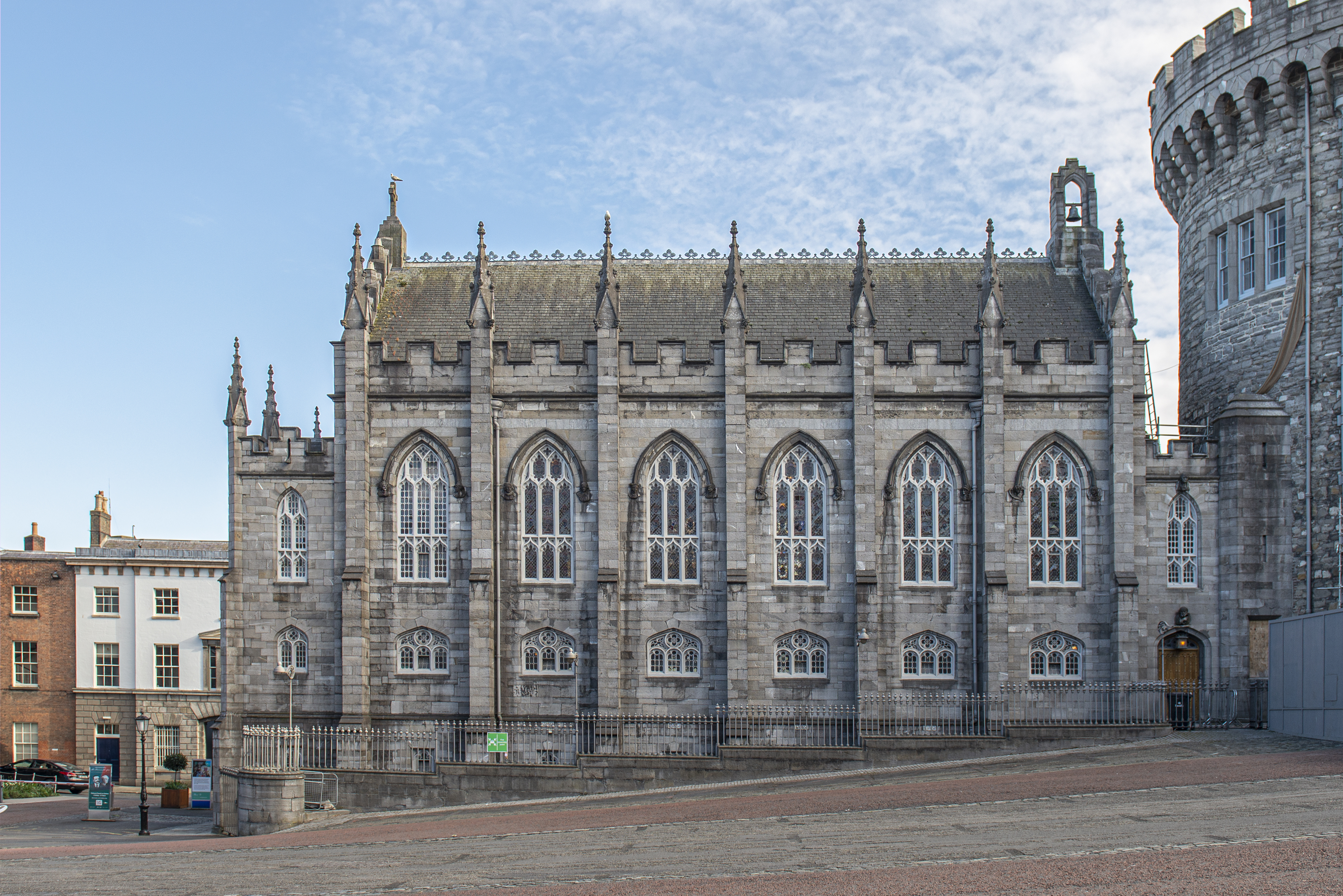
- A view of the exterior

- Location within Central Dublin

Religion
- Affiliation: Church of Ireland (1814–1922); Catholic (1943–1982); None (1922–1943; 1983–present)
- Province: Leinster
- Year consecrated: 1814
- Status: Museum

Location
- Location: Dublin Castle, Dublin, Ireland
- Coordinates: 53°20′35″N 6°15′59″W

Architecture
- Architect: Francis Johnston
- Style: Gothic revival

The Chapel Royal in Dublin Castle is a 19th-century Gothic revival chapel which served as the official Church of Ireland chapel of the Household of the Lord Lieutenant of Ireland from 1814 until the creation of the Irish Free State in December 1922, which terminated the office of Lord Lieutenant. In 1943, the chapel was reconsecrated as a Catholic place of worship and rededicated as the Church of the Most Holy Trinity, but it has not been used for worship since 1983.

== Construction ==
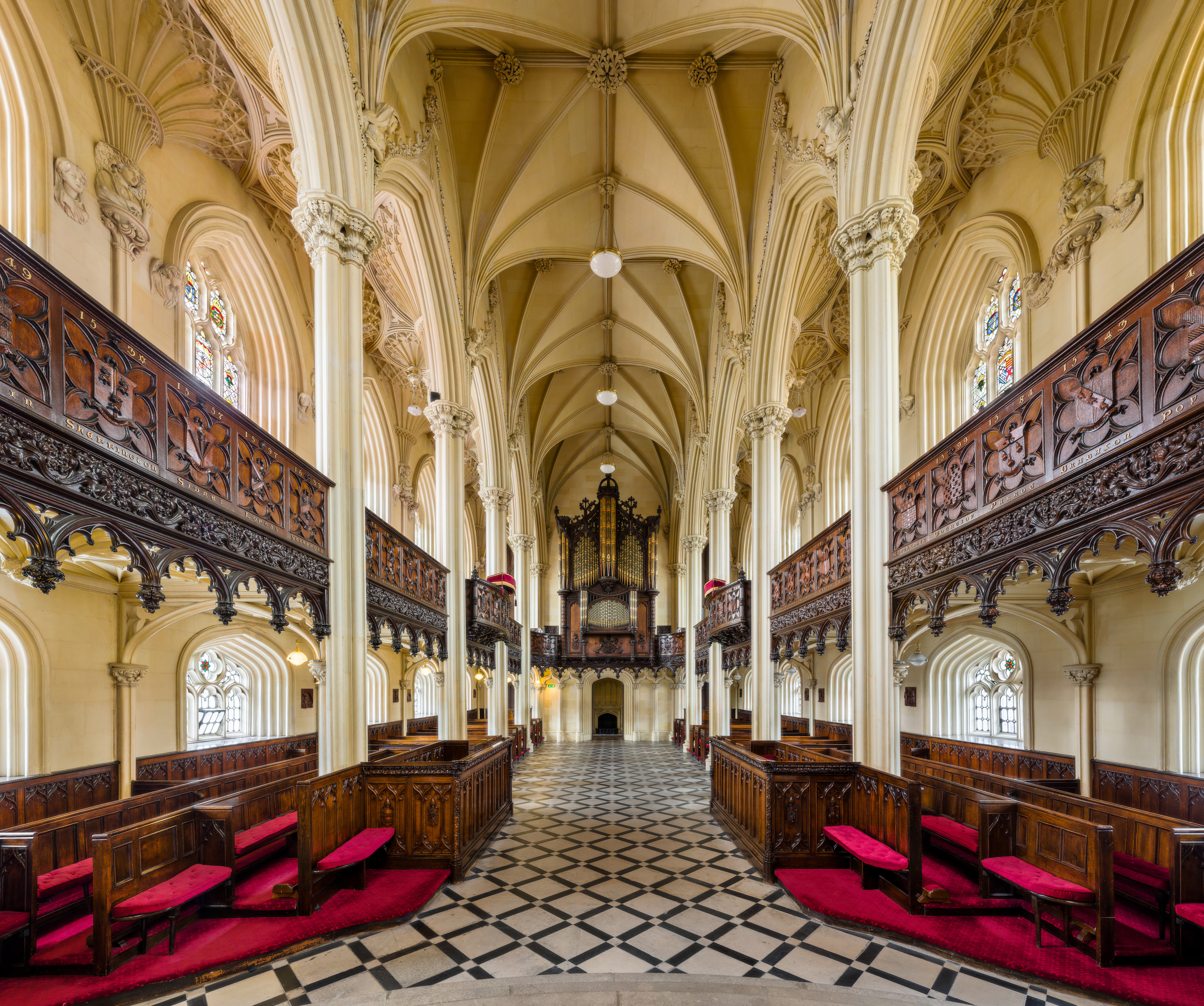
The interior of the chapel looking west toward the organ and entrance

Designed by Francis Johnston (1760–1829), the foremost architect working in Ireland in the early 19th century, and architect to the Board of Works, the chapel contains one of the finest Gothic Revival interiors in Ireland. Replacing an earlier undistinguished 18th-century church that suffered structural problems through being built on soft ground close to the site of the original castle moat, the new Chapel Royal was built using a timber frame to make it as light as possible. Indeed, so difficult was the nature of the site that the chapel took seven years to build, though a contributory factor in both time and budget was the "sheer opulence" of its interior.

The foundation stone was laid by the 6th Duke of Bedford, the then Lord Lieutenant, on 15 February 1807. It was completed behind schedule (the budget also substantially overran) and opened on Christmas Day, 1814, when the 1st Viscount Whitworth (later created the 1st Earl Whitworth) was Lord Lieutenant. Lord Whitworth contributed the centre portion of the large stained-glass window above the altar, which he had purchased while in Paris, and which reputedly had come from Russia (he had been plenipotentiary in St. Petersburg in the 1790s). The surroundings are painted glass, executed by a Mr Bradley in Dublin. At the apex of the window are the arms of Lord Whitworth.

The decoration of the ceiling of the interior was done by George Stapleton (son of Michael Stapleton), a leading stuccodore of the time, while sculptor Edward Smyth (responsible for the "river heads" on the Custom House) and his son John Smyth (responsible for the statues on the GPO) carved the larger figures. Over the chancel window are three life-size figures representing Faith, Hope and Charity. Over the galleries are heads representing Piety and Devotion. All the interior vaulting and columns are cast in timber and feature a paint wash (faux pierre) to give the effect of stone. It was described as having "the most flamboyant and luxurious Dublin interior of its era."

The exterior was clad in a thin layer of "fine limestone from Tullamore quarry", and famously features over 90 carved heads, including those of Brian Boru, St. Patrick, Archbishop Ussher and Jonathan Swift, done by Edward and John Smyth.

== Historical features ==
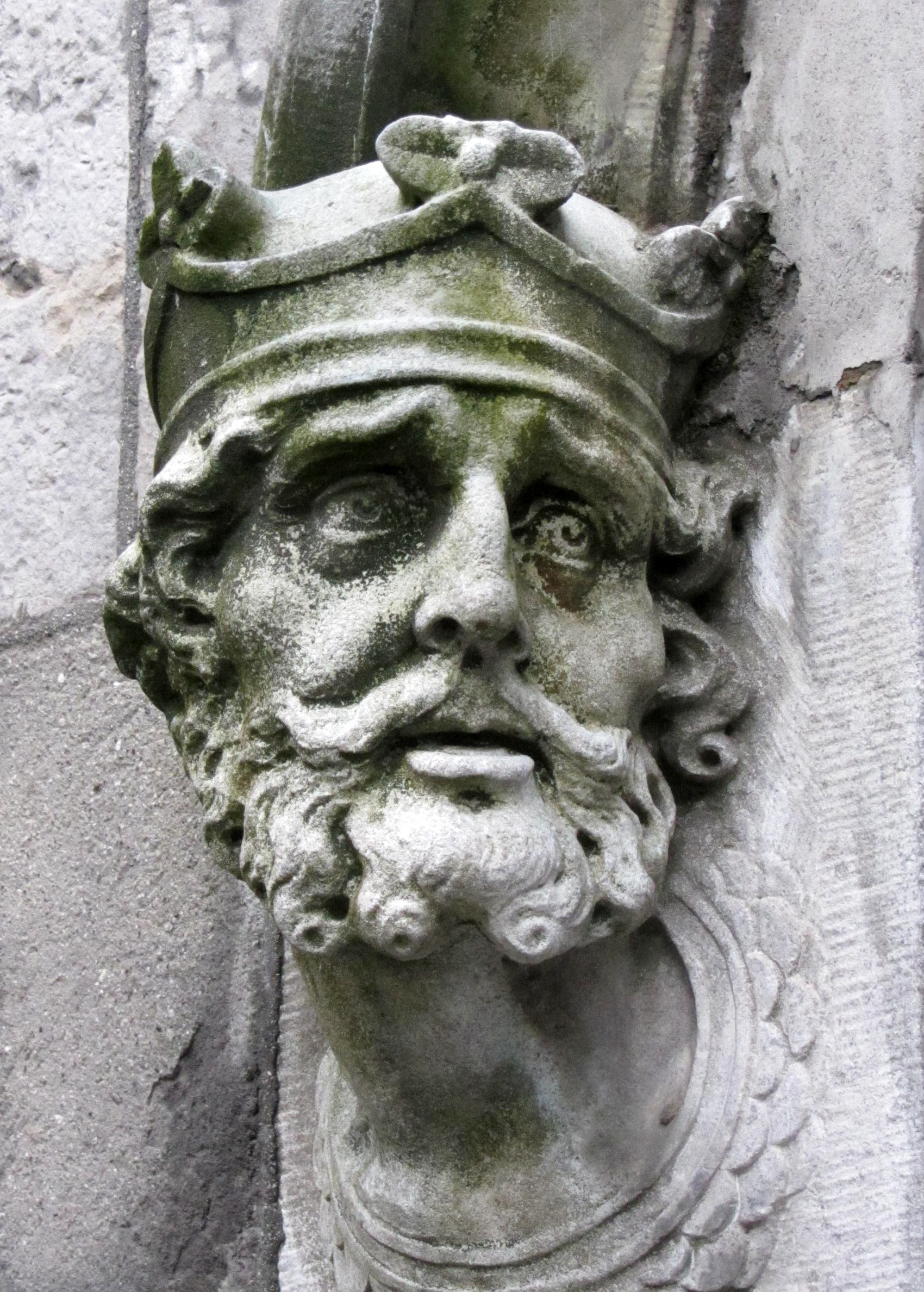
Brian Boru sculpture outside Chapel Royal

This was the third chapel in the castle, and the second on this spot, since medieval times. Before the completion of the Chapel Royal, the Lords Lieutenant, their entourage and hangers-on sometimes attended St. Werburgh's Church at the rear of the Castle to the west. The enormous pulpit that used to dominate the Chapel Royal has now been removed to St. Werburgh's.

Behind one of the galleries is a passage that leads to the bedrooms in the State Apartments. This was used by the Lord Lieutenant and his entourage when they were staying at the Castle. His pew (or throne) was in the centre of the right-hand gallery. Directly facing him was the place for the bishop. Lord Whitworth's arms appear directly at the Lord Lieutenant's position, a most prominent spot.

The organ case was constructed in 1857 to house a new organ by William Telford of Dublin, which replaced an earlier instrument by William Gray of London installed in 1815. A new organ was built by the firm Gray and Davison in 1900 into the same case. Although the case was restored in 2008, the organ is no longer playable as the pipework and mechanisms have been removed.

As each Lord Lieutenant left office, their coat of arms was carved on the gallery, and then, when space ran out, placed in a window of the chapel. It was noted by Irish nationalists that the last window available was taken up by the man who proved to be the last Lord Lieutenant, the 1st Viscount FitzAlan of Derwent (himself a Catholic).

== Present day ==
In 1943, the chapel was consecrated by Archbishop of Dublin John Charles McQuaid as a Catholic military church, and in 1944 was renamed the Church of the Most Holy Trinity. The Stations of the Cross were carved by the monks in Glenstal Abbey and presented to the church in 1946. Increasing structural problems caused its closure in the early 1980s. The building was restored and reopened in the early 1990s, although it has not since been used for worship. It is occasionally used for concerts and other events.

The chapel was used in the television series The Tudors for scenes including the trial of Thomas More.

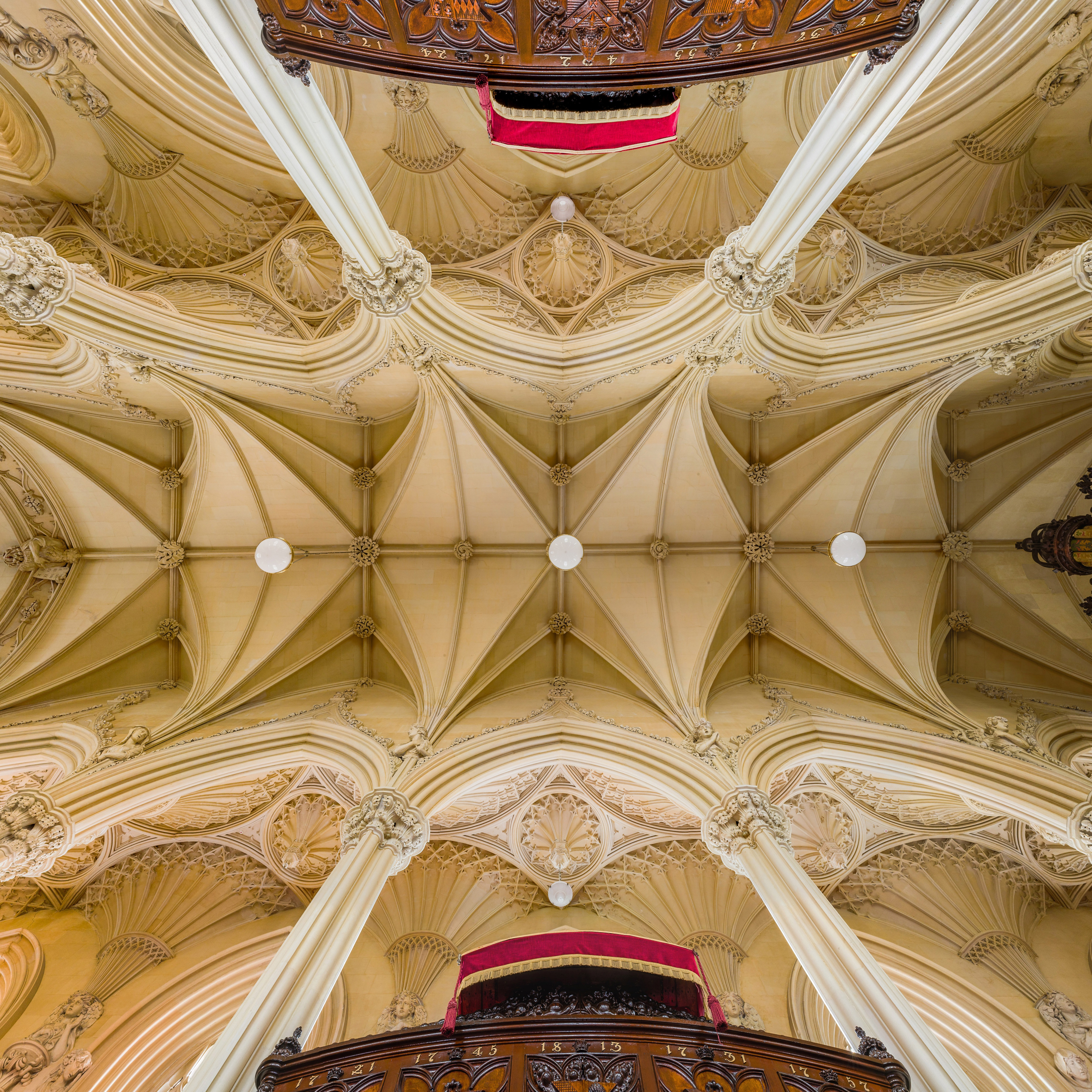
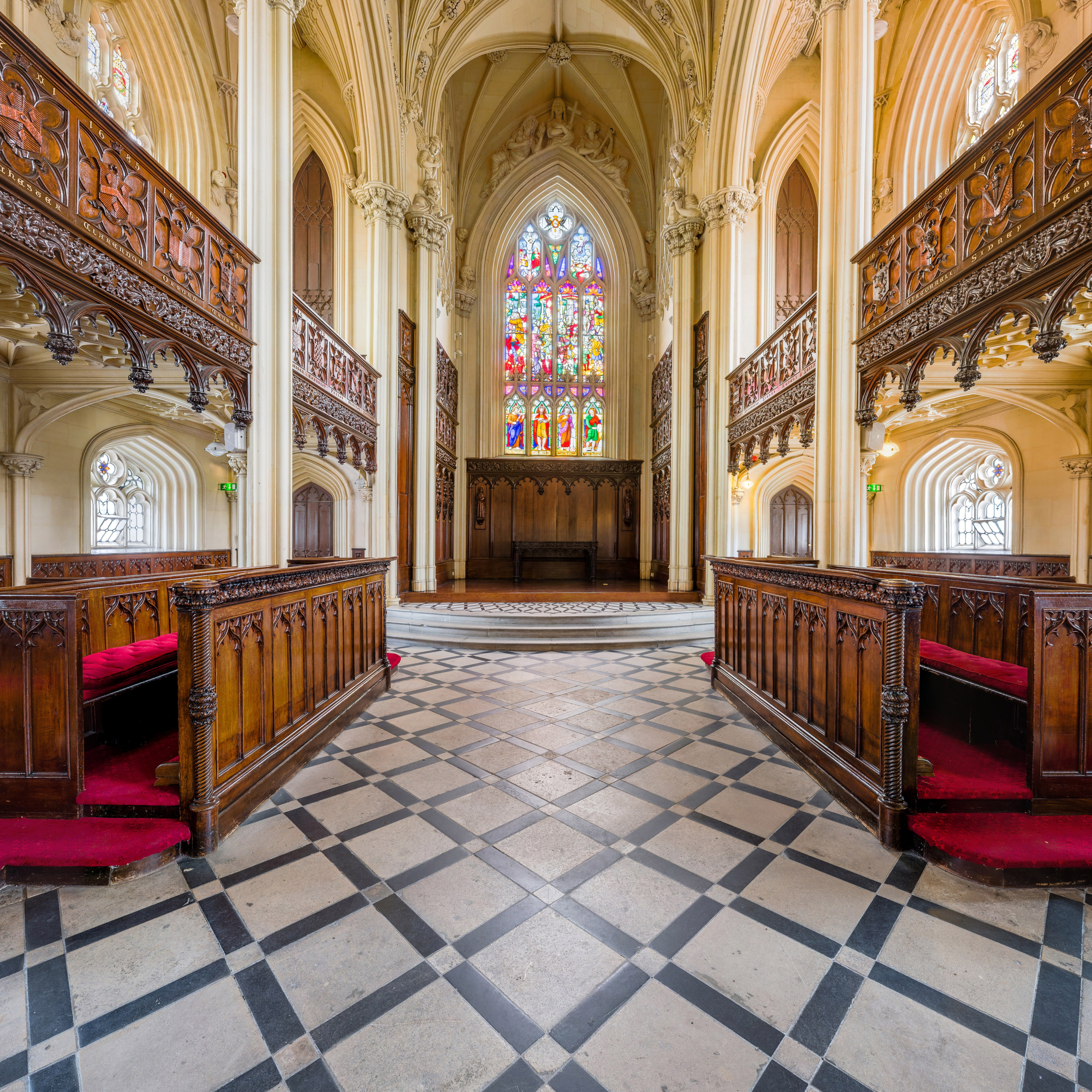
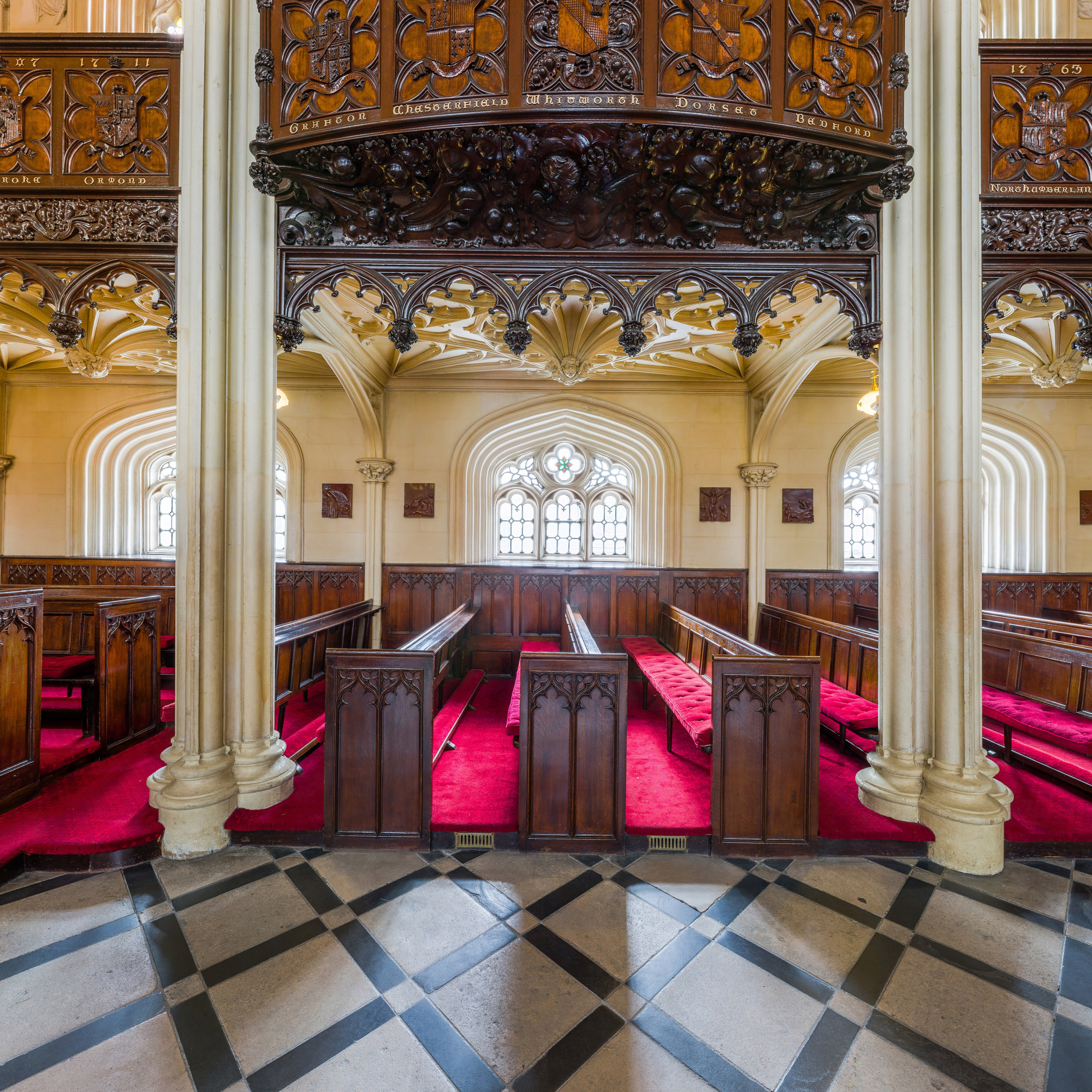
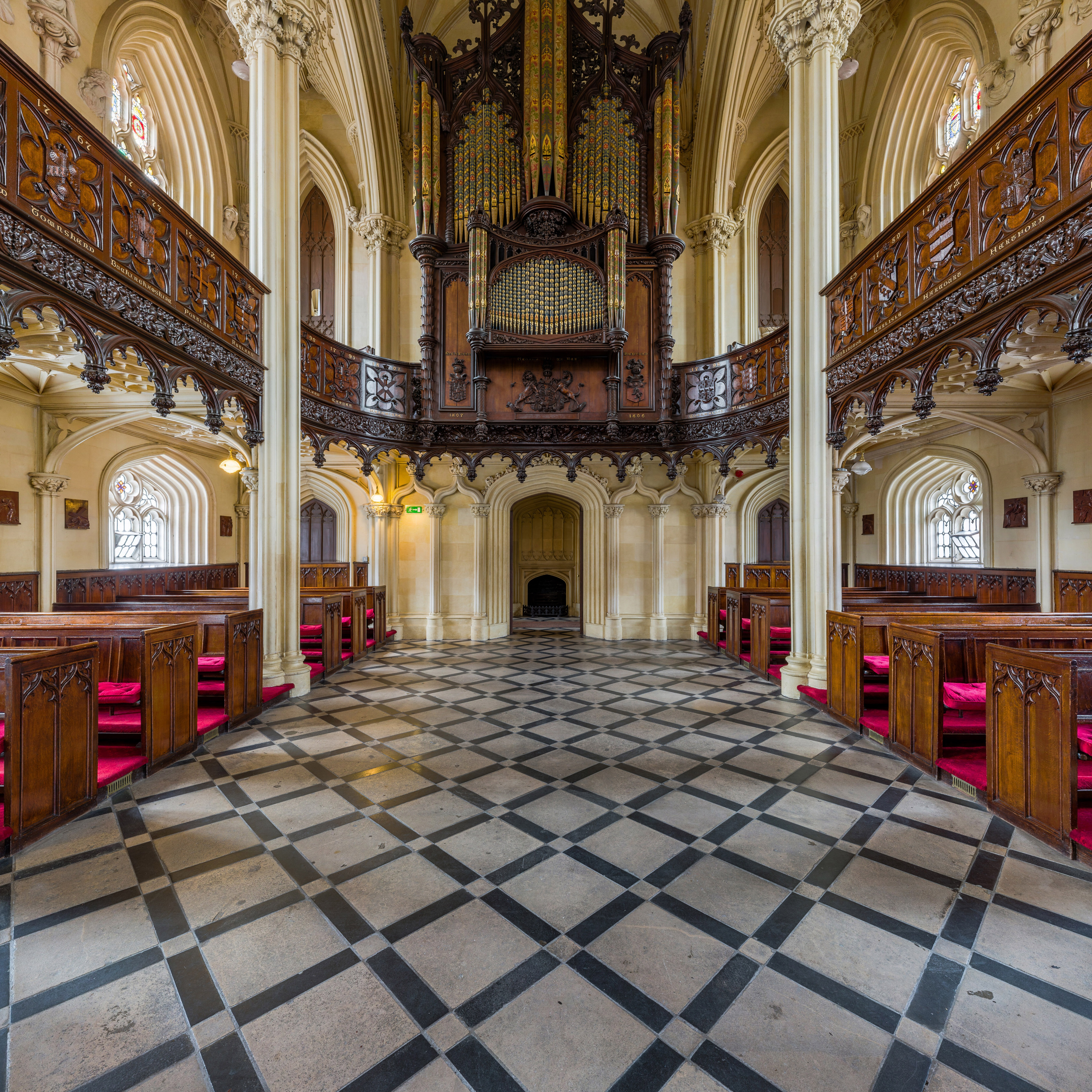
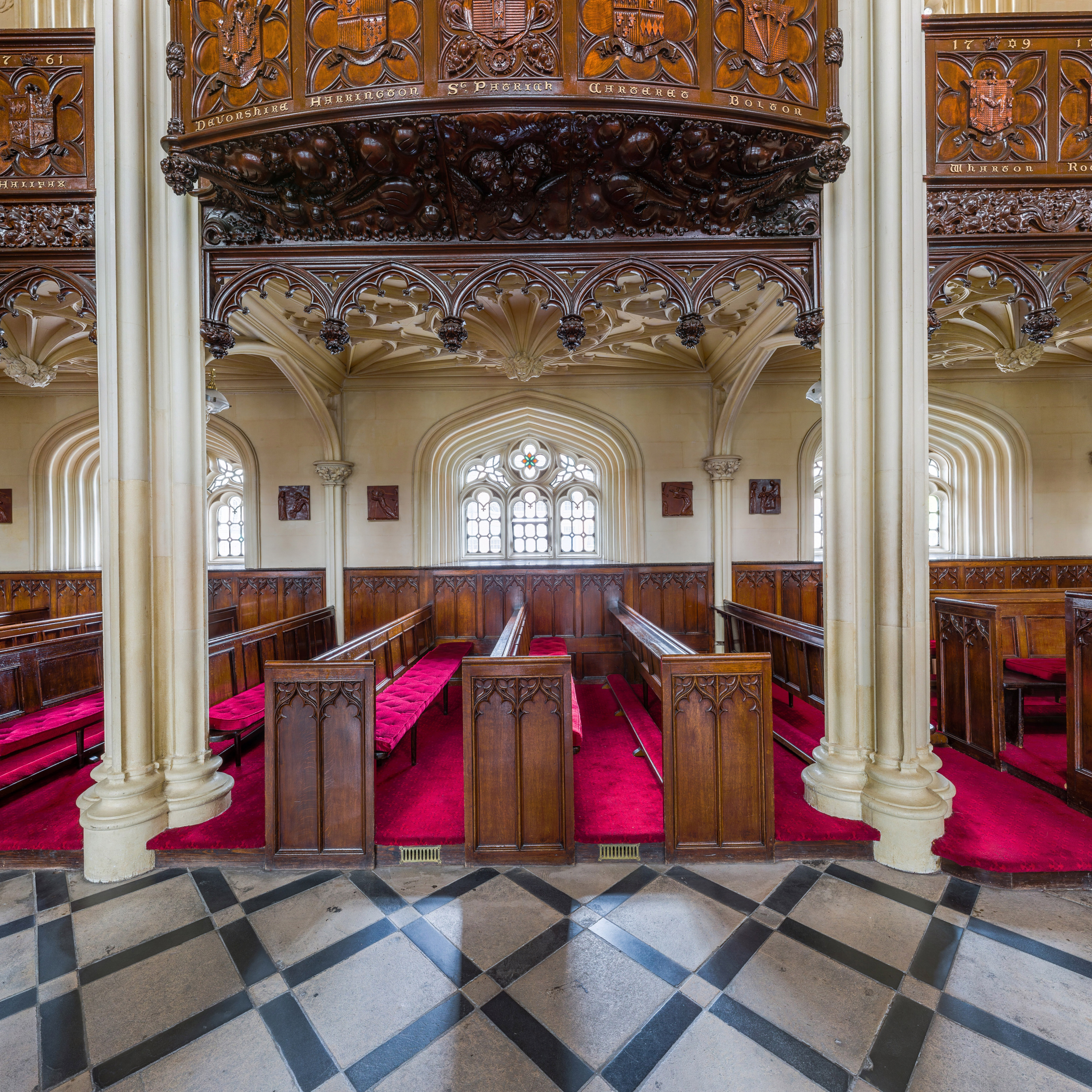
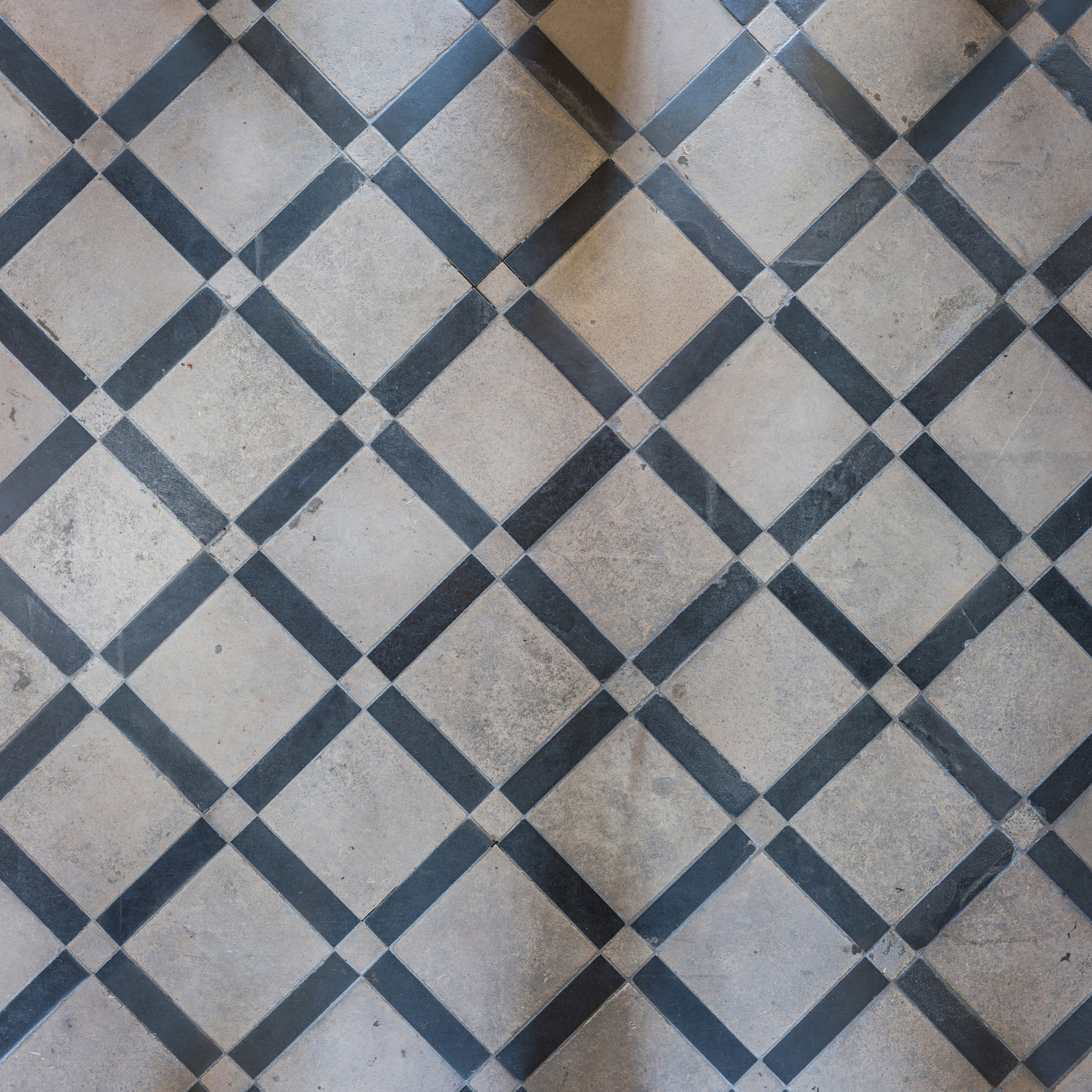
Panorama of the chapel interior.

== See also ==
- Dean of the Chapel Royal

== References and sources ==
Notes

Sources

- Lucey, Conor (2007). The Stapleton Collection: Designs for the Irish neoclassical interior. Tralee: Churchill Press. ISBN 978-0-9550246-2-7.
- McCarthy, Denis; Benton, David (2004). Dublin Castle: at the heart of Irish History. Dublin: Irish Government Stationery Office. ISBN 0-7557-1975-1.
- Johnston, Francis (1896). The Chapel Royal, Dublin Castle (reprint). Dublin: The Irish Builder (trade journal).
- Costello, Peter (1999). Dublin Castle, in the life of the Irish nation. Dublin: Wolfhound Press. ISBN 0-86327-610-5.
- Campbell, Myles; Derham, William (2015). The Chapel Royal, Dublin Castle: An Architectural History. Trim: Office of Public Works. ISBN 9781406428902.
