= Winter of 2009–10 in Great Britain and Ireland =

Winter of 2009–10
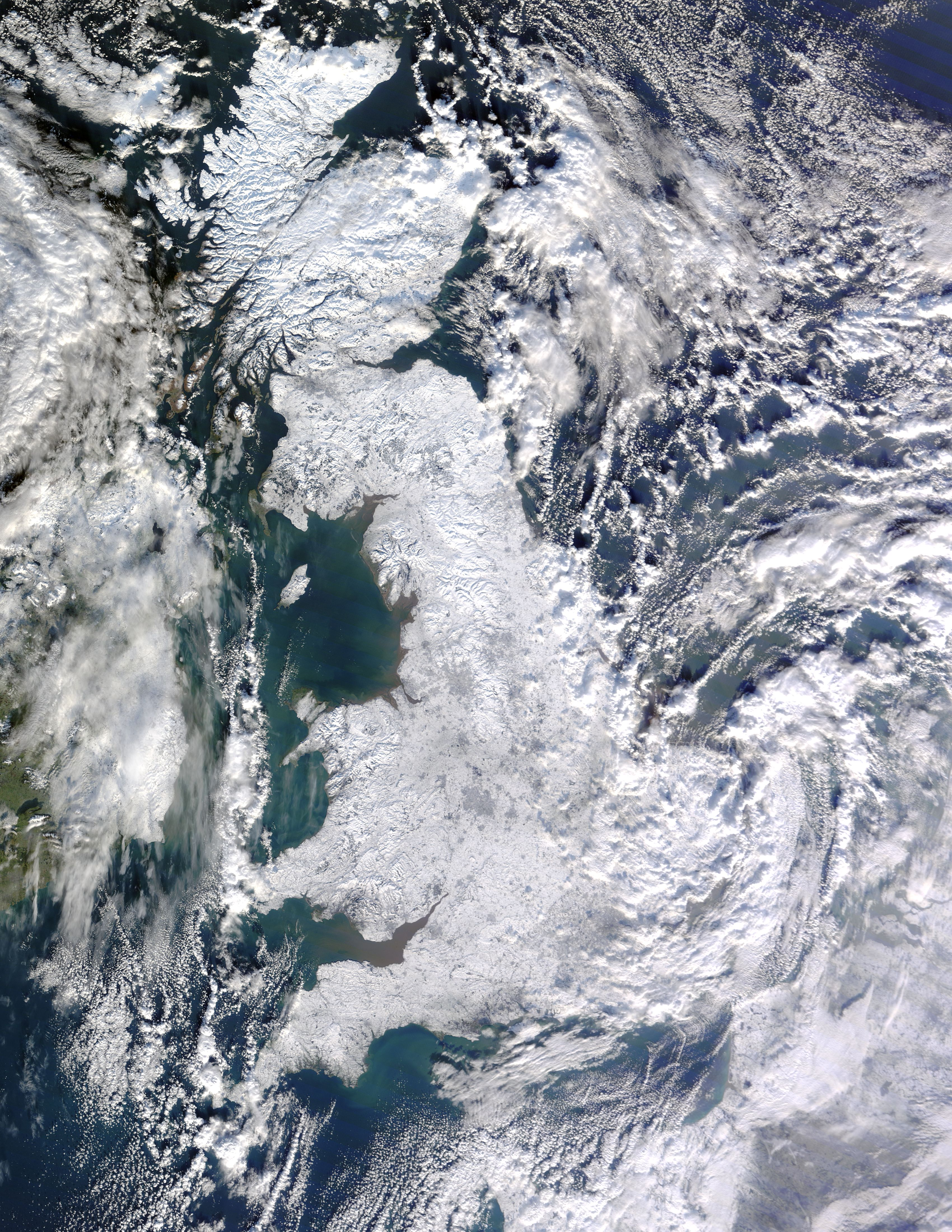
- Satellite photo of Great Britain and eastern Ireland showing the extent of snow cover. This photo was taken on 7 January 2010 following consecutive days of snow.
- First event started: 17 December 2009
- Last event concluded: 25 January 2010

Seasonal statistics
- Maximum snowfall accumulation: 61 cm (24 in) (26 February, Aviemore, Highland)
- Total fatalities: 25
- Total damage: £700 million

Related articles
- Winter of 2009–10 in Europe

The winter of 2009–10 in the United Kingdom (also called The Big Freeze of 2010 by British and Irish media) was a meteorological event that started on 16 December 2009, as part of the severe winter weather in Europe. January 2010 was provisionally the coldest January since 1987 in the UK. A persistent pattern of cold northerly and easterly winds brought cold, moist air to the United Kingdom with many snow showers, fronts and polar lows bringing snowy weather with it.

The first snow fell on 17 December 2009, before a respite over the Christmas period. The most severe snowy weather began on 5 January in North West England and west Scotland with temperatures hitting a low of −17.6 °C (0.3 °F) in Greater Manchester, England. The snow spread to Southern England on 6 January and by 7 January the United Kingdom was blanketed in snow, which was captured by NASA's Terra satellite. The thaw came a week later, as temperatures started to increase.

The winter weather brought widespread transport disruption, school closures, power failures, postponement of sporting events, and 25 deaths. A low of −22.3 °C (−8.1 °F) was recorded in Altnaharra, Scotland on 8 January 2010. Overall it was the coldest winter since 1978–79, with a mean temperature of 1.5 °C (34.7 °F).

== Timeline ==
=== December 2009 ===
==== 16 December ====
On 16 December forecasters warned of very heavy snowfall to come. A band of rain moved southwards over the UK, which brought some snow. Snow fell in Kent, Surrey, Sussex and Hampshire, which brought some disruption. Day time temperatures were around 0 °C (32 °F) and a low of −7.4 °C (18.7 °F) was recorded in Surrey.

==== 17 December ====
On the 17th, easterly winds brought heavier and persistent snow showers to eastern England and Scotland. Heavy snow showers brought accumulation up to three centimetres (1 1/4 inches) in Aberdeenshire, Perth, Kinross and Fife, with some snow showers reaching Glasgow and western parts in the afternoon and evening. In Kent, it caused chaos as motorists on the A21 were stuck for several hours during the evening and night.

==== 18 December ====
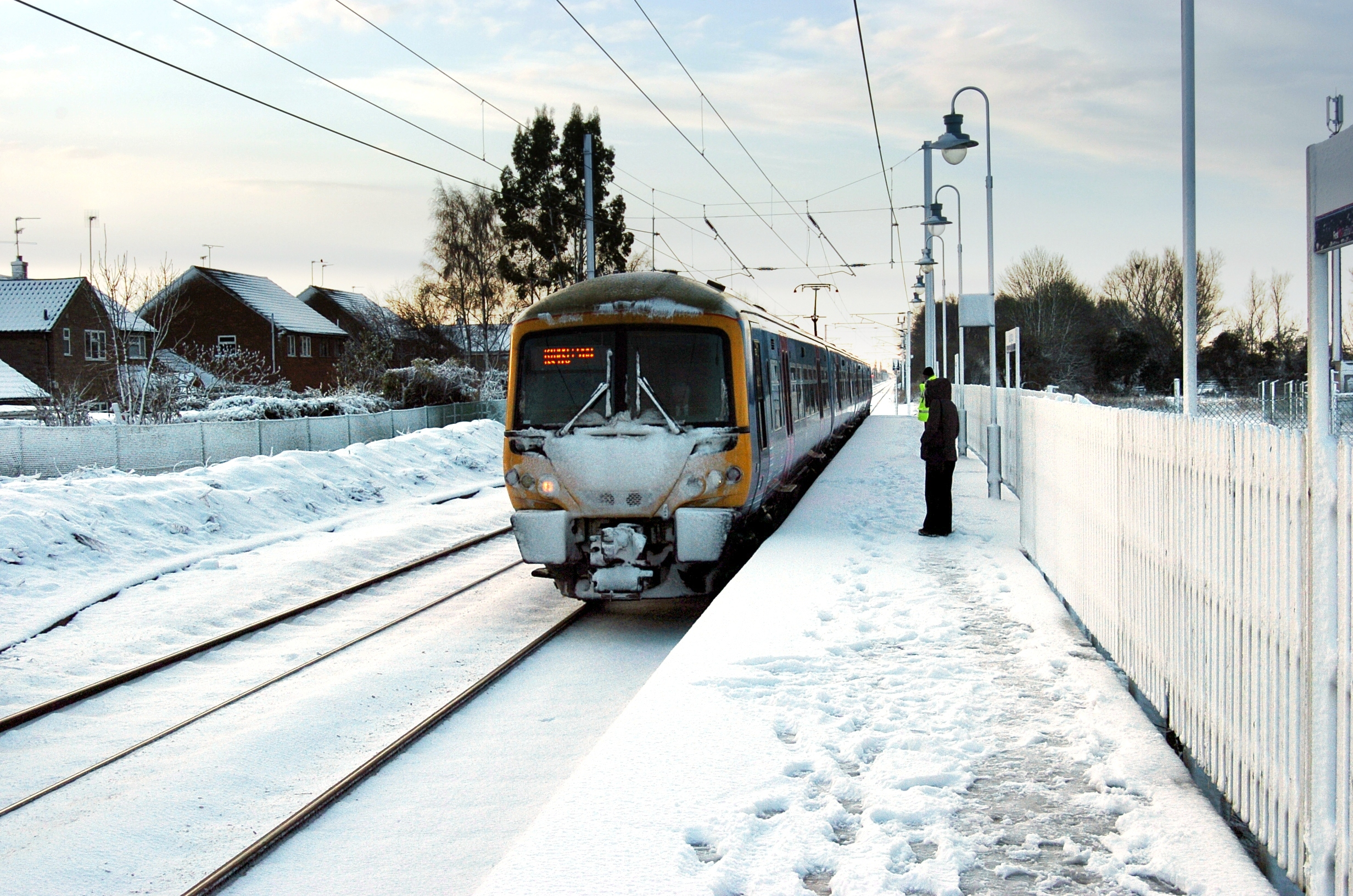
A train pulling into Watlington railway station, 18 December 2009

More heavy snow showers followed on the 18th after heavy overnight snow caused widespread disruption across England in the South East, East Anglia, the East Midlands, Yorkshire and the Humber. Easterly winds brought further snowfalls in both the northern and southern halves of the UK.

Overnight, five Eurostar trains were stuck in the Channel Tunnel after cold temperatures caused electrical failures, trapping 2,000 people for 16 hours. Many schools in England were closed. Four Eurostar trains broke down inside the Channel Tunnel, after leaving France, and one in Kent on 18 December. Although the trains had been winterised, the systems had not coped with the conditions. Over 2,000 passengers were stuck inside failed trains inside the tunnel, and over 75,000 had their services disrupted. All Eurostar services were cancelled from Saturday 19 December to Monday 21 December 2009. An independent review, published on 12 February 2010, was critical of the contingency plans in place for assisting passengers stranded by the delays, calling them "insufficient". Snow also disrupted motorways, including the M1, and many airports were closed.

==== 19 December ====
The 19th brought snow to northern areas. The wind changed to a northerly with a front pushing south over Scotland. 3 cm (1 1/4 in) of snow accumulated in northern Scotland, southern Scotland and parts of north and north-east England.

==== 20 December ====
Overnight, north-westerly winds brought snow showers to western, northern and central Scotland, Northern Ireland, north Wales and northern and western England. Northern and western Scotland had the heaviest snow showers with accumulations up to 15 cm (5.9 in) in places in the morning 3 cm (1 1/4 in) of snow was lying within Glasgow by 9.00 am. During the afternoon and evening, it snowed heavily again across much of Scotland, Northern Ireland and North Wales, with accumulations up to 10–15 cm (4-6"), causing school closures and travel chaos the next day.

==== 21 December ====
On the 21st some further snow showers affected some parts of the UK with some particularly heavy showers in northern areas.

The M25 motorway and large parts of the M3, M23, M4, M40, M1 and M11 motorways were brought to a standstill until late into the night, and many towns were gridlocked. About 100 people were able to travel from London Victoria station to Ashford International railway station courtesy of a steam train hauled by Tornado. Widespread transportation disruption affected parts of England, Wales, Scotland and Northern Ireland.

==== 22 December ====
Central Scotland, from Argyll through Glasgow to Edinburgh, had very heavy snowfall during the evening, accumulating an additional 7 cm (2 3/4 in). On the Isle of Lewis, one man died due to the very cold weather. The temperature dropped to −16 °C (3 °F) overnight in Dalwhinnie in Cairngorms National Park, Scotland, and it fell to −10 °C (14 °F) in Edinburgh.

Fresh overnight snowfall brought renewed problems to other parts of the United Kingdom. In England, north Hampshire and the Thames Valley were particularly badly affected. In Basingstoke, some 3,000 motorists were forced to either abandon their vehicles or sleep in them overnight after becoming stuck in gridlocked traffic. 2,000 cars were abandoned. The Manchester area had frozen snow which made some dangerous travelling conditions.

The AA vehicle recovery service accused some local authorities of not acting quickly enough to grit roads and claimed some "key roads" had "not been gritted at all". The Local Government Association dismissed the claims as "unverified, unsubstantiated and unjustified".

==== 23 December ====
In Scotland, overnight temperatures once again dropped to well below freezing, with Dalwhinnie in the central Highlands of Scotland recording a low of −16 °C (3 °F) and in Edinburgh −10 °C (14 °F). Large amounts of snow fell in eastern Scotland, with accumulations of up to a foot recorded in the Lothians, Lanarkshire, Edinburgh, Fife and Perth and Kinross. Serious disruption to road transport lead the Scottish Transport Minister Stewart Stevenson to state that conditions on Scottish roads were the worst for 20 years.

Air travel was disrupted in the United Kingdom, with Southampton Airport cancelling or diverting all inbound and outbound flights until around 11:30AM because of a frozen runway. A Ryanair flight landing at Glasgow Prestwick Airport overshot the runway, though no injuries were reported and the airport was soon reopened. Other public transport was also affected, with train services cancelled for the majority of the day from Southampton Airport Parkway.

Two women were killed and more than 40 people injured following a coach crash on an ungritted country road in Cornwall as a party returned from a trip to see Christmas lights in Mousehole the previous evening. Weather forecasters warned of icy conditions and further snowfall into Christmas Eve, affecting particularly northern England and the East Midlands, which would disrupt those who were planning to travel for the Christmas holidays.

==== 24 December ====
Lying snow gave some travel disruption; however, Christmas Eve was a relatively calm day. However, parts of North Yorkshire, particularly the Harrogate area, experienced heavy snowfall during the day.

==== 25 December ====
On Christmas Day parts of Britain had a White Christmas for the first time since 2004 after snow fell in parts of Scotland, parts of northern and central England and north Wales. Many parts of northwestern Ireland had a white Christmas also, whilst freezing rain affected most other parts of the country.

==== 26 December ====
On Boxing Day drivers in Northern Ireland were warned of icy conditions, but conditions in many other parts of the UK continued to improve as milder air moved in from the south. However, northern England and Scotland remained cold, and night time temperatures continued to drop below freezing. Some Boxing Day sporting fixtures were cancelled or postponed because of continuing icy conditions in places, including the National Hunt meeting at Towcester and all but two of the Scottish Football League's fixtures. Some parts of East Anglia suffered electricity power cuts, including Dedham, Stratford St. Mary and parts of Colchester; in more remote parts of the region, some were continuously without power for 36 hours.

==== 27 December ====
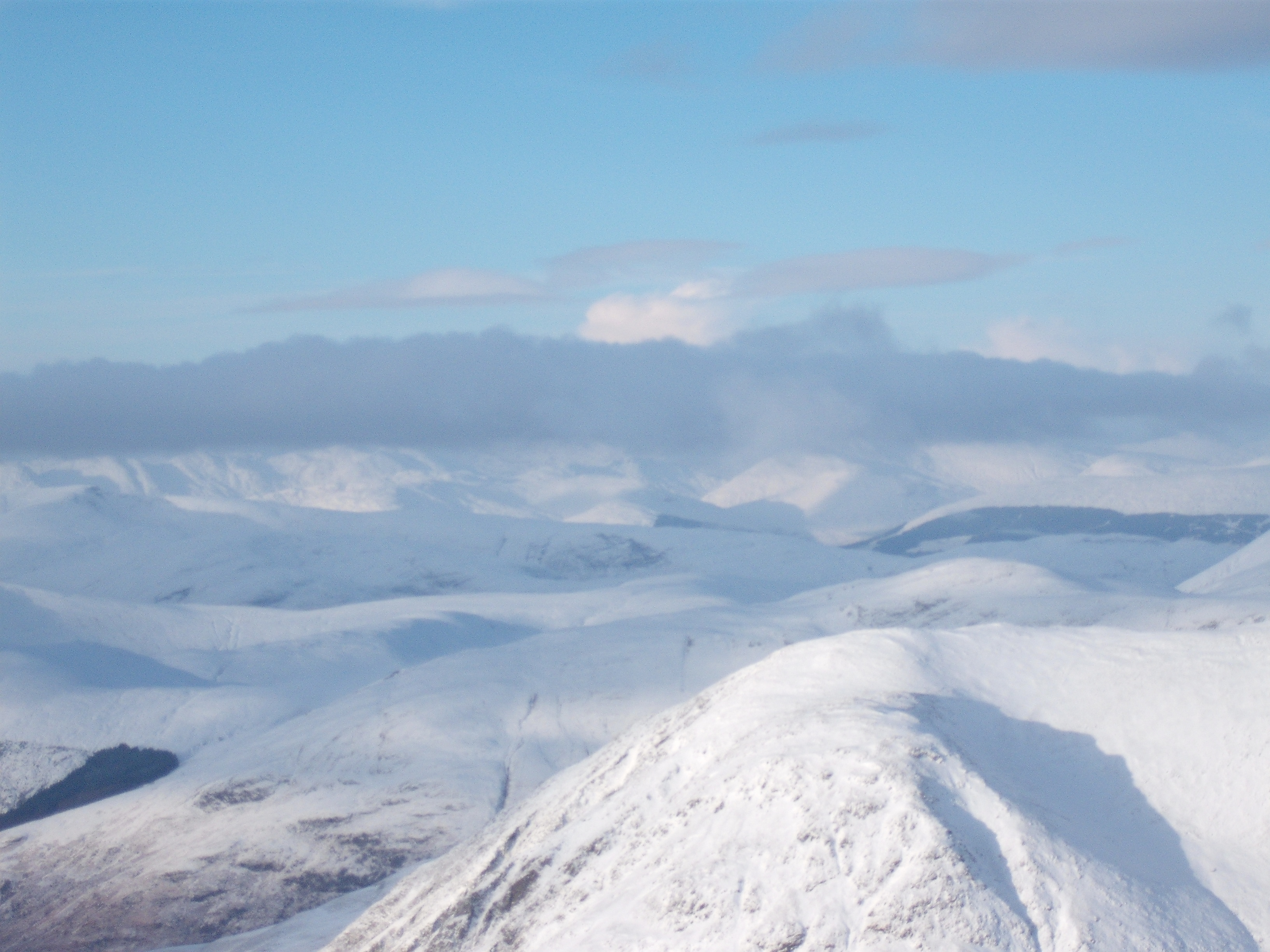
Glen Coe, Scotland, on 27 December

Parts of England again suffered repeated power cuts, and Scotland experienced fresh snowfall overnight on 26–27 December with the worst affected area being Perthshire, where between 12 and 18 inches (30 and 46 centimetres) fell.

==== 28 December ====
Temperatures fell to −16 °C (3 °F) in Tyndrum overnight on 27–28 December, and to −14 °C (7 °F) at Tulloch Bridge in the Highlands. The Met Office issued fresh severe weather warnings and motorists were advised to drive with caution. The A75 between Stranraer and Newton Stewart was closed because of "treacherous icy conditions", while the southbound carriageway of the A9 was blocked between the A8624 and B8081 in Perth and Kinross following an accident at Glen eagles.

==== 29 December ====
Temperatures dropped to −18 °C (0 °F) in parts of the Highlands overnight on 28–29 December, with Braemar recording Britain's lowest temperature of the winter. Fresh travel warnings were issued on 29 December as the wintry conditions continued to cause problems on Scotland's roads.

The runway of Inverness Airport was briefly closed because of snow and ice, and First ScotRail reduced services to and from Glasgow Central because of the severe conditions.

The snow and icy conditions were good for the Scottish ski industry, which said the weather helped it to experience its best start to the season for several years.

Warnings of heavy snow were issued for Wales, the Midlands, north-west England, eastern and southern England and Yorkshire and Humber. More snow began falling across parts of Wales and central and northern England on the evening of 29 December, with Wales recording the heaviest of the snow showers where some rural areas were cut off by of up to 30 cm (12 in). Snow was also reported in parts of the West Midlands region and Yorkshire.

==== 30 December ====
Sportscotland Avalanche Information Service (SAIS) issued warnings about conditions on Scottish mountains. However, three people died in three large avalanches. Two climbers were killed as a result of an avalanche on Ben Nevis, while a man was airlifted from Liathach, a mountain in Torridon, after getting into trouble, and died in hospital.

==== 31 December ====
Continued icy weather in Scotland on New Year's Eve led to the cancellation of Hogmanay celebrations in Inverness amid concerns over public safety. New Year celebrations in other parts of Scotland went ahead as planned. North-east Scotland experienced fresh snowfall during the afternoon and evening of 31 December. For the second time that week Inverness Airport was closed, forcing several hundred passengers to make alternative arrangements. In Batley, West Yorkshire 2,500 gallons of water leaked into the local gas network, leaving 400 homes in Dewsbury and Batley without gas during sub-zero temperatures. The final homes were reconnected on 7 January. Dublin and most of Leinster in Ireland were hit for the first time in the 2009–10 Winter.

=== January 2010 ===
==== 1 January ====
Fresh overnight snowfall on New Year's Eve and New Year's Day caused disruption in north-east England, with roads across Northumberland, Tyne and Wear, County Durham, Teesside and the Scottish Borders affected. Snow also fell in parts of eastern Cumbria. In places it was as deep as 10 cm (3.9 in) and motorists were warned not to travel unless their journey was absolutely necessary.

==== 2 January ====
A weather front driven by a strong northerly wind brought heavy snow in north Wales, the Isle of Man and north-west England. Wythenshawe near Manchester Airport had 13 cm (5 in) of snow. This affected road transport on 2 January, particularly in the Greater Manchester area with conditions on the M60, M602 and M66 reported to be poor, while Snake Pass, which links Manchester with Sheffield, was closed.

In Scotland, a number of roads across the country were closed, including three junctions of the M9, while the motorway was shut in both directions at the Newbridge Roundabout in Edinburgh during the evening because of heavy snow, and did not open again until the following day. Problems were also reported on the A96 and the A939. Rail services between Inverness and Central Scotland were also affected by poor weather.

==== 3 January ====
Parts of north east England and Cumbria had 6 cm (2.4 in) of snow, and Edinburgh had 9 cm (3.5 in). Europe's largest private sector weather business, MeteoGroup, announced that the previous month was the coldest December on average since 1996. Temperatures remained very cold on 3 January throughout Ireland and Britain, with some snow showers in Kent and north east England, although lighter than on previous days.

Following days of disruption because of the weather, Inverness Airport finally could operate normally. Because of the cold snap, shooting of reared mallard, geese, woodcock, snipe and golden plover in Scotland was banned for two weeks from 5 to 19 January.

==== 4 January ====
In Scotland, Fife Council became the first local authority to confirm that its supply of grit was exhausted after it received less than it had ordered from suppliers. Ministers denied there was a shortage of grit and salt and insisted there were "very substantial" supplies for Scotland's roads.

In its monthly summary, Met Éireann, Ireland's weather service, said December was the coldest month for 28 years for most of the country and the coldest of any month since February 1986 at a few stations.

==== 5 January ====
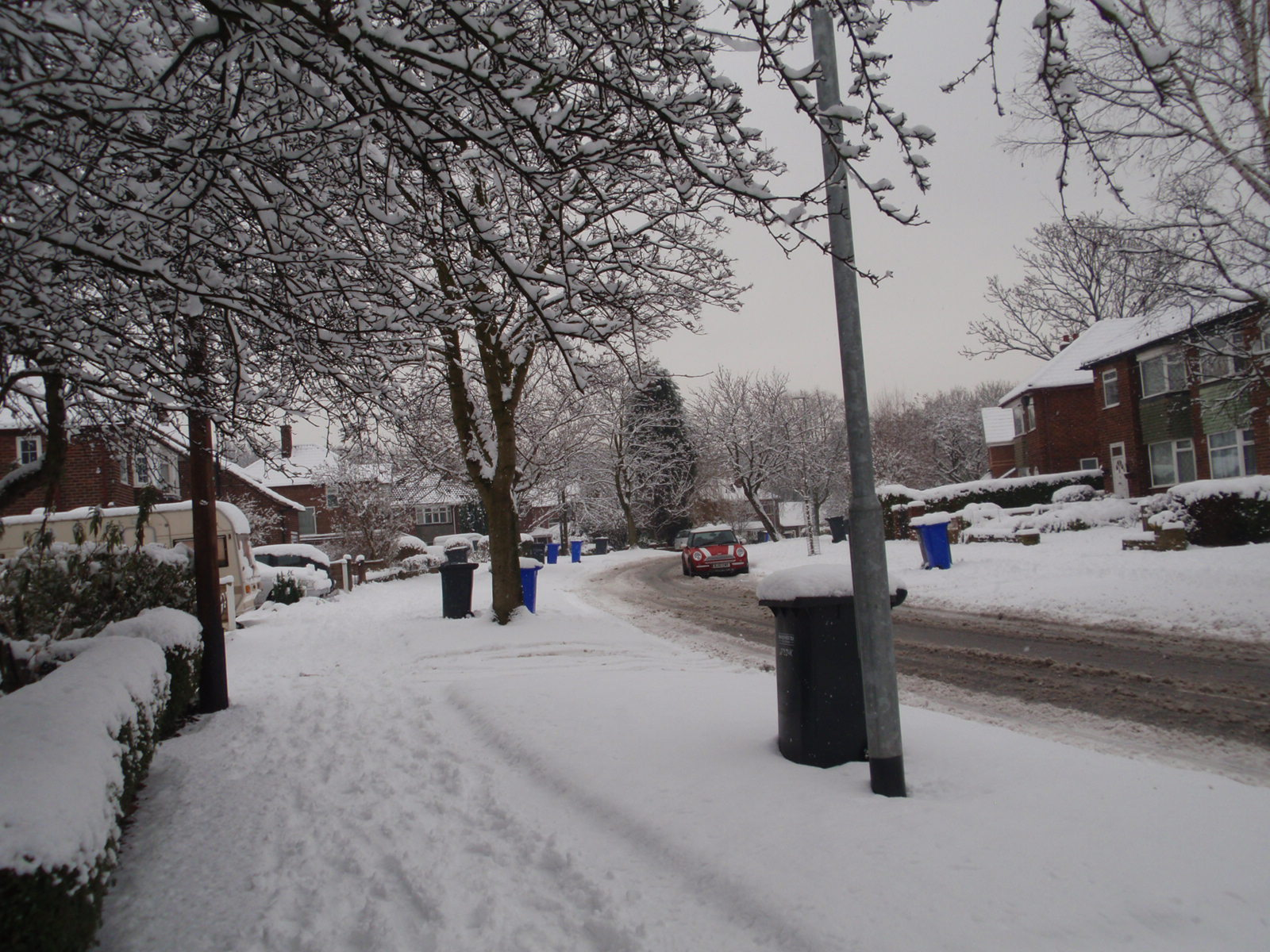
Manchester, England, on 5 January when the severest spell of the snow began

The Met Office issued weather warnings for every region in the UK except the Northern Isles. An extreme weather warning was issued for southern areas for overnight snowfall which could have brought accumulations from 25 to 40 centimetres (9.8 to 15.7 in). BBC Weather and the Met Office also warned that temperatures in the Highlands of Scotland could drop to −20 °C (−4 °F) later in the week. The Met Office also confirmed that the UK is experiencing the longest prolonged cold spell since December 1981. The Harrogate district endured over six inches and had been a regular feature on BBC News broadcasts.

A local record of 48 cm (19 in) of snow was lying in Aviemore and 0.91 to 1.22 metres (3 to 4 ft) of snow was recorded within the Cairngorms National Park. Most parts of Scotland had further snowfalls during the night of 4/5 January.

Due to shortage of road grit conventionally made from rock salt, road grit was being made by or for road-gritters from cooking-type salt mixed with builders' sand, and the public bought up large amounts of cooking salt and table salt from food shops to put on their paths and drives. The Government was reported to have reallocated reserve supplies of road salt and grit from Oxfordshire and Buckinghamshire and sent it to Cumbria and Fife due to the higher priority of even lower salt and grit reserves, along with the greater snow clearance work, according to BBC Radio Oxford.

==== 6 January ====
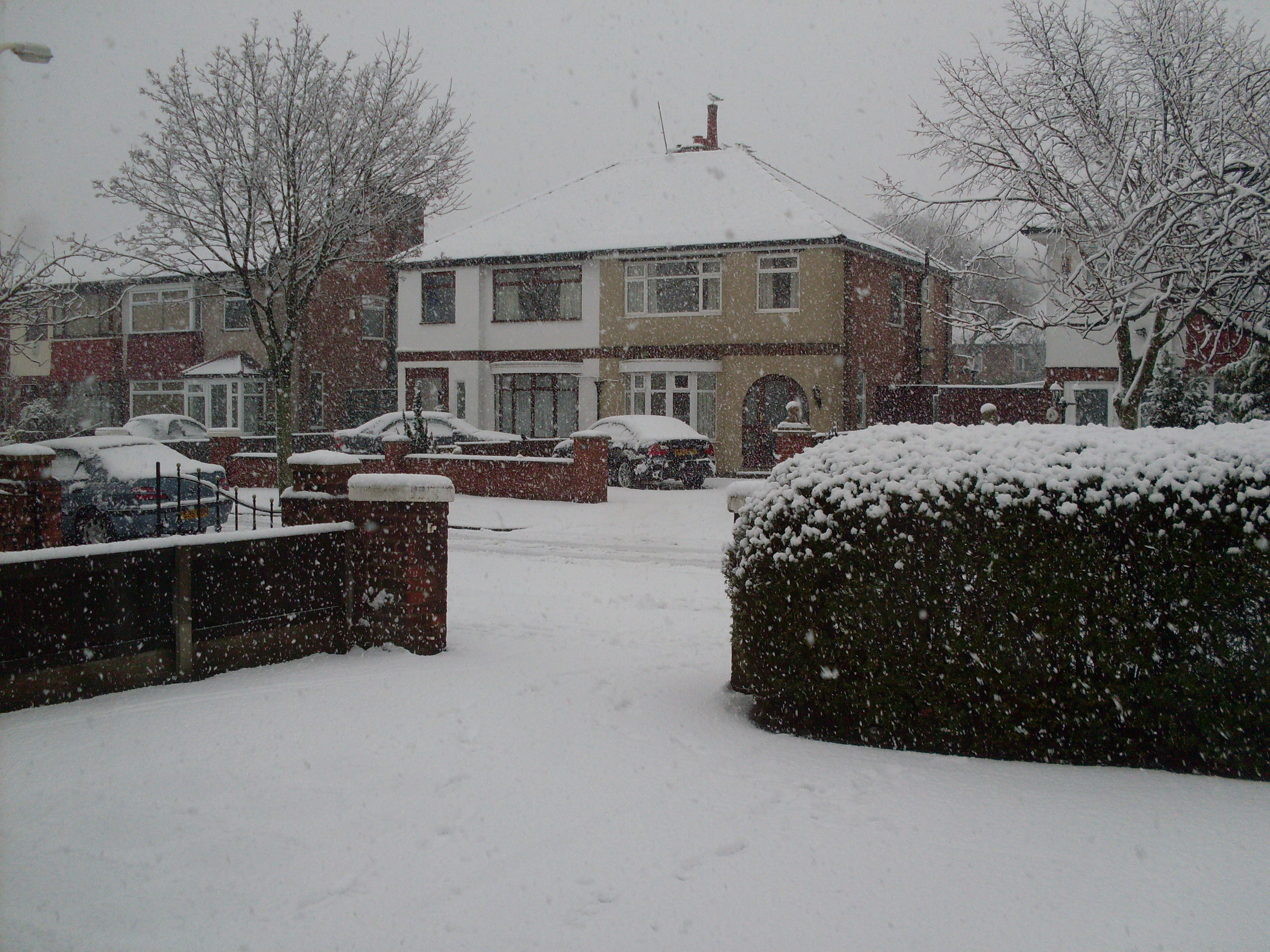
Heavy snowfall in Southport, Merseyside, on 5 January

The synoptic situation in northern Europe settled to a steady northeast wind which brought snow showers and belts of snow.

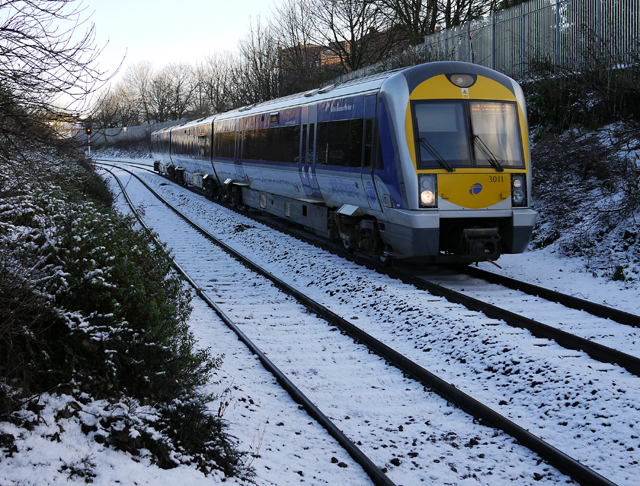
A train arriving at Botanic railway station on Northern Ireland Railways, on 6 January

The British Army had to help stranded motorists in southern areas. The Met Office confirmed that 40 centimetres (16 in) of snow fell in some parts of southern England.

A severe warning issued by the Met Office was in place for every region in the UK. Scottish First Minister Alex Salmond said Scotland was experiencing its worst winter since 1963. Further deaths in Wales, Shetland and Aberdeenshire were recorded. Roads in the southeast were left with traffic jams and abandoned cars. 8,000 schools were closed.

In eastern parts of England, there were accumulations from 40 cm (16 in) up to 50 cm (20 in) in places. In Kent, six inches of snow fell in four hours in the early evening.

==== 7 January ====
Overnight temperatures of −18 °C (0 °F) were recorded during the morning at Benson, Oxfordshire and Woodford, Greater Manchester. Over 10,000 schools closed across the UK owing to very heavy snow and disrupted transport. The National Grid issued its second alert in three days, asking suppliers to provide more gas and some businesses to switch to other power sources as gas usage hit record levels. A high of −8.5 °C (16.7 °F) was recorded at Loch Glascarnoch. Snow showers also affected Wales and the south-west of England, whilst periods of heavy snow dumped a further 5–10 cm (2-4") of snow across the south-east corner.

==== 8 January ====
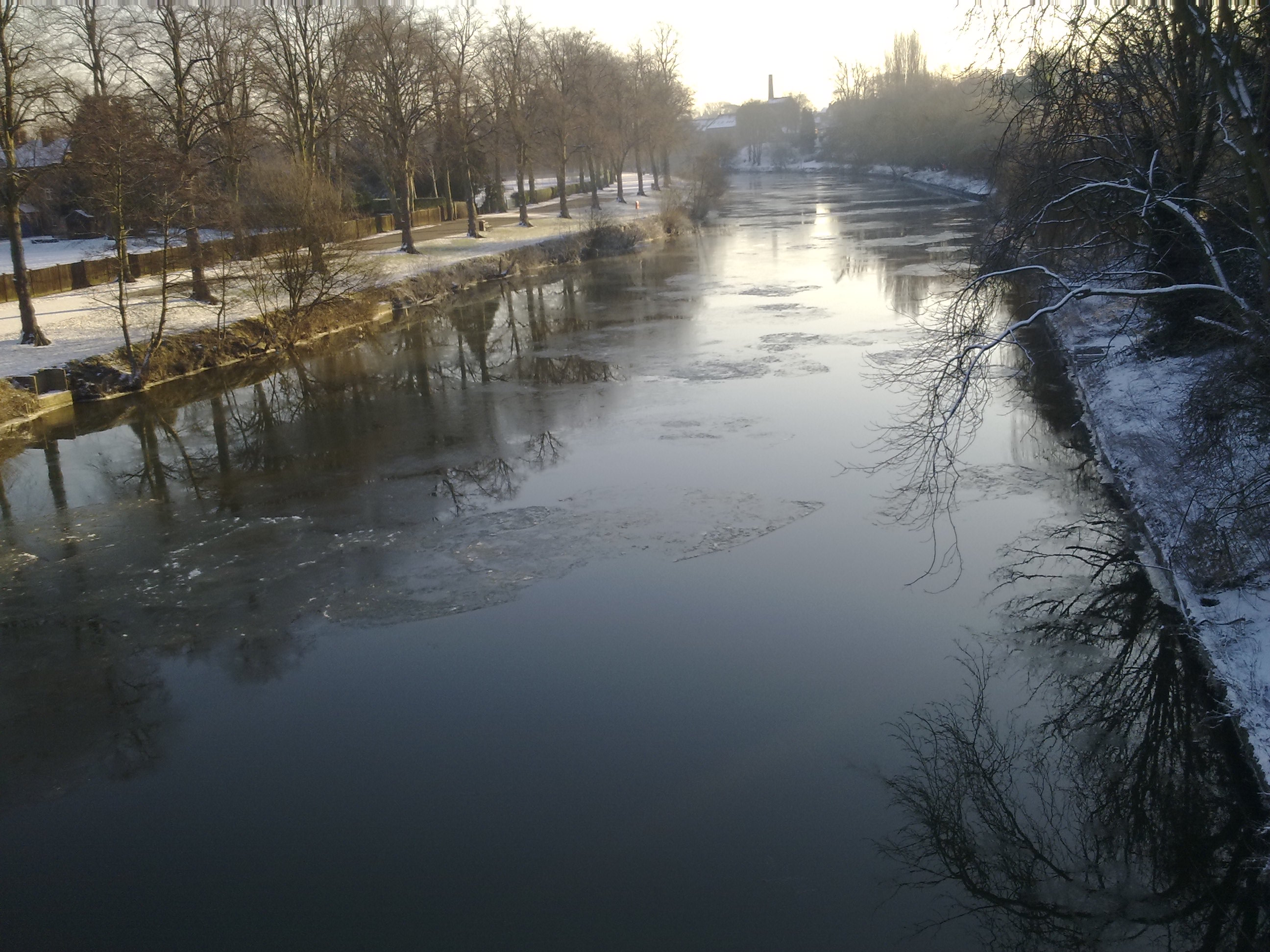
Ice on River Severn at Shrewsbury, England on 8 January

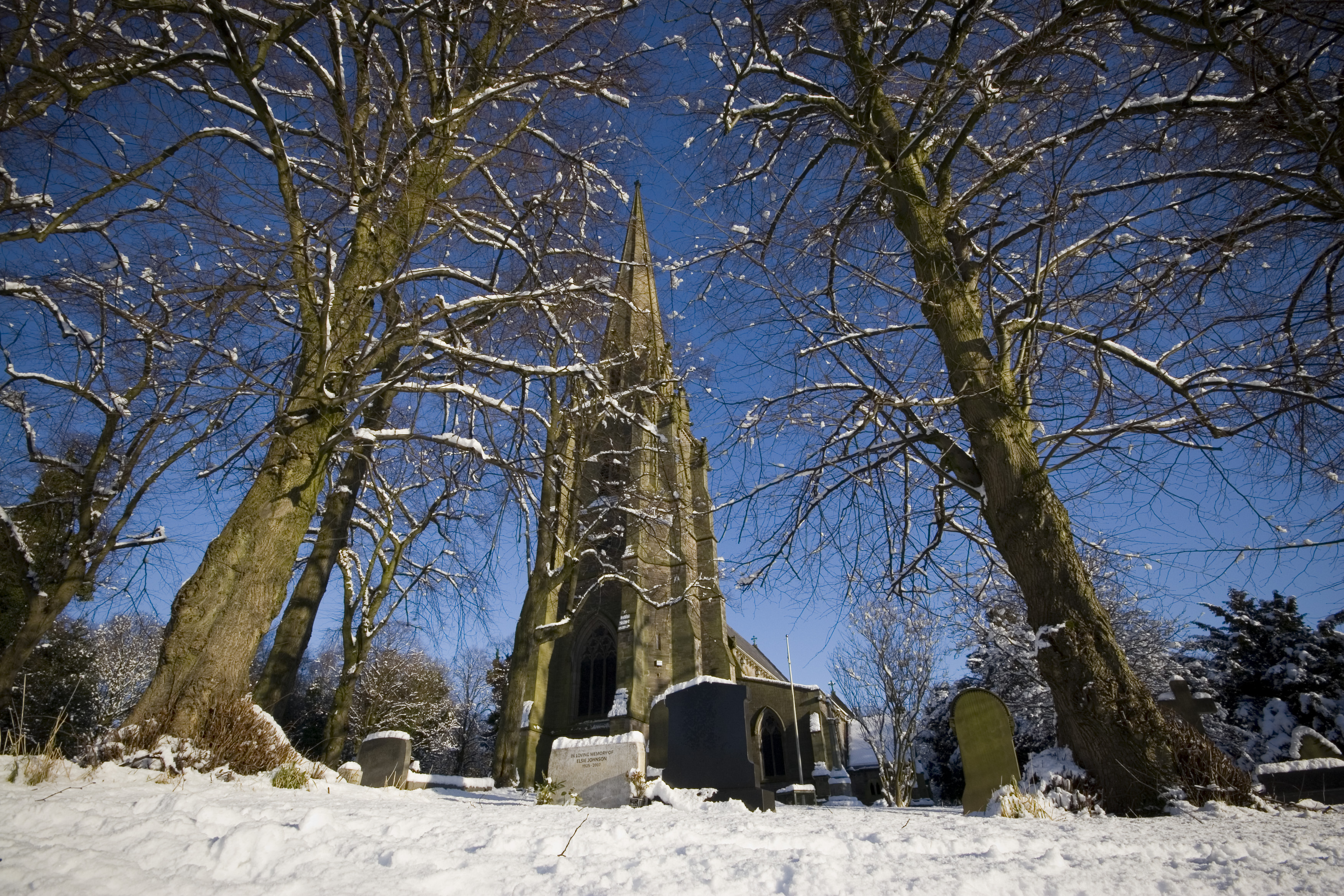
Worsley, Greater Manchester, England, on 8 January

Overnight temperatures of −22.3 °C (−8.1 °F) were recorded in Altnaharra in the Scottish Highlands. Heavy snow fell in the North of England throughout the day giving significant accumulations. A high of −7.7 °C (18.1 °F) was recorded at Tulloch Bridge.

John Kilraine reported on a man slipping and falling on ice, shouting "Oh shit" as he fell. The video was recorded on Church Street near the Four Courts in Dublin as part of RTÉ's early evening news broadcast Six One showcasing the effects of the poor weather and how Dublin City Council was working on removing slush from the streets. Following the news broadcast, the video of the man falling quickly became viral online.

==== 9 January ====
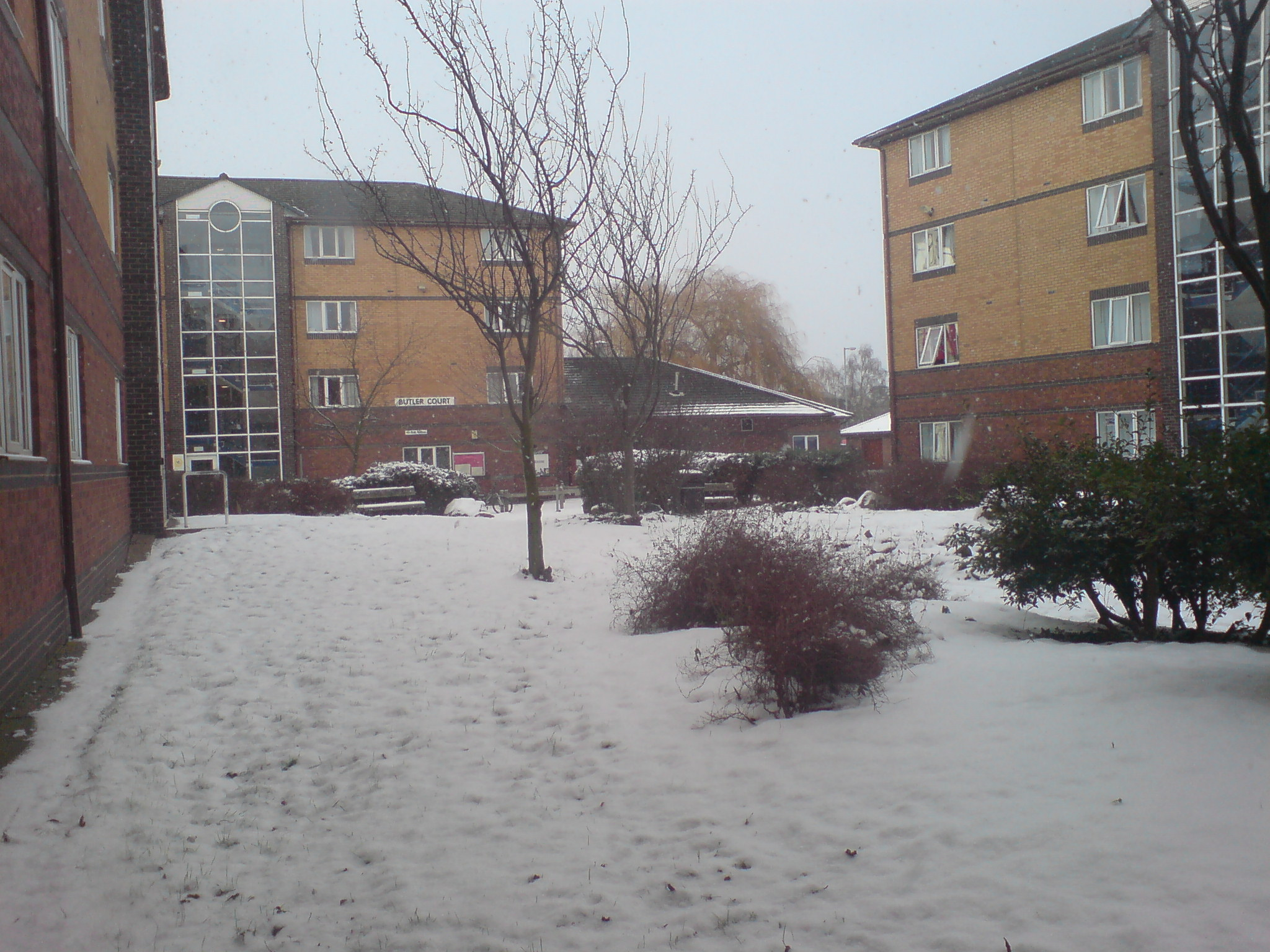
Butler Court – Loughborough University, England, on 9 January

Deal and Sandwich in Kent, England, were virtually cut off by snowdrifts. Snow showers persisted in the east of the UK. In the far south-east, snow showers merged into longer and more persistent areas of snow. A low of −14.5 °C (5.9 °F) was recorded at Tulloch Bridge.

The football schedule was also heavily affected by the snowfall; all but seven games (two in both the Premier League and League 1 and three in the Championship) were postponed in England, and all but five Scottish Cup games were postponed in Scotland. Several Guinness Premiership games and horseracing meets were also cancelled.

==== 10 January ====
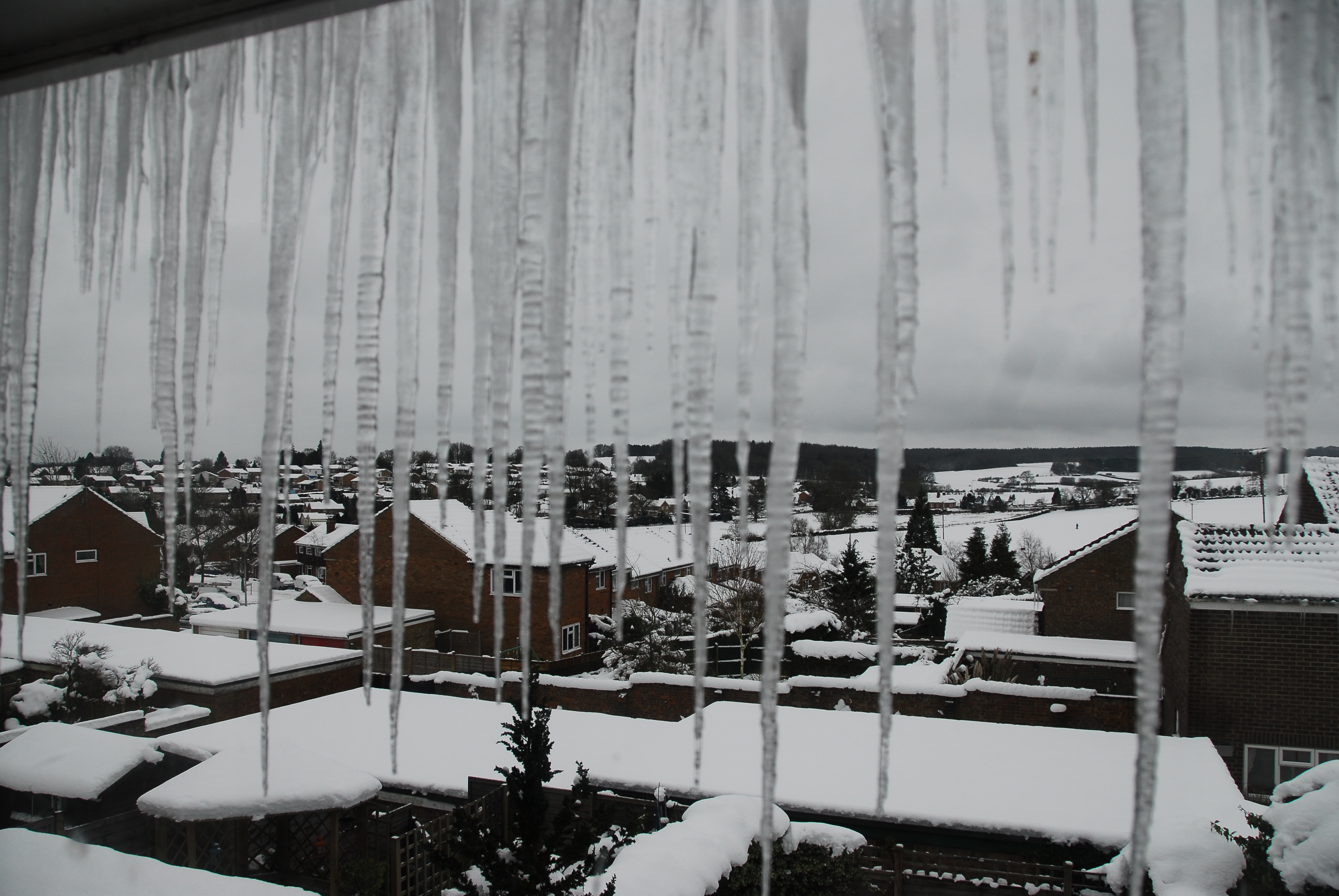
Alton, England, on 10 January

During the early hours, light snow showers spread across parts of Central England and Wales. The maximum temperature was −13.5 °C (7.7 °F) in Altnaharra and a low of −18.4 °C (−1.1 °F) was recorded at Kinbrace. In eastern Ireland exceptionally heavy and persistent snowstorms moved across Dublin, Kildare and Wicklow counties during the late afternoon hours. A foot of snow was reported in parts of County Kildare and blizzards affected the Wicklow Mountains. Ferry services from Dublin and Dún Laoghaire as well as air travel from Dublin Airport were cancelled. Heavy snow showers from Ireland advanced eastwards across the Irish Sea arriving in north and west Wales during the latter part of the evening. Parts of north Wales, especially Gwynedd, were very badly hit, receiving up to 40 cm (16 in) of snow adding to any previous accumulations. The event caused travel chaos in many rural areas of north Wales, ferry services from Holyhead in Anglesey were cancelled. Parts of Snowdonia reported drifts up to 15 metres deep. Heavy snow was also reported in the Midlands and north west England with high winds leading to blizzard conditions over the Pennines throughout the day.

==== 11 January ====
Rain, sleet and snow travelled northwards throughout the early hours. Allenheads in England had fears over a potential 4.6 m (15 ft) snowdrift. A low of −21.0 °C (−5.8 °F) was recorded in Altnaharra, Highland.

==== 12 January ====
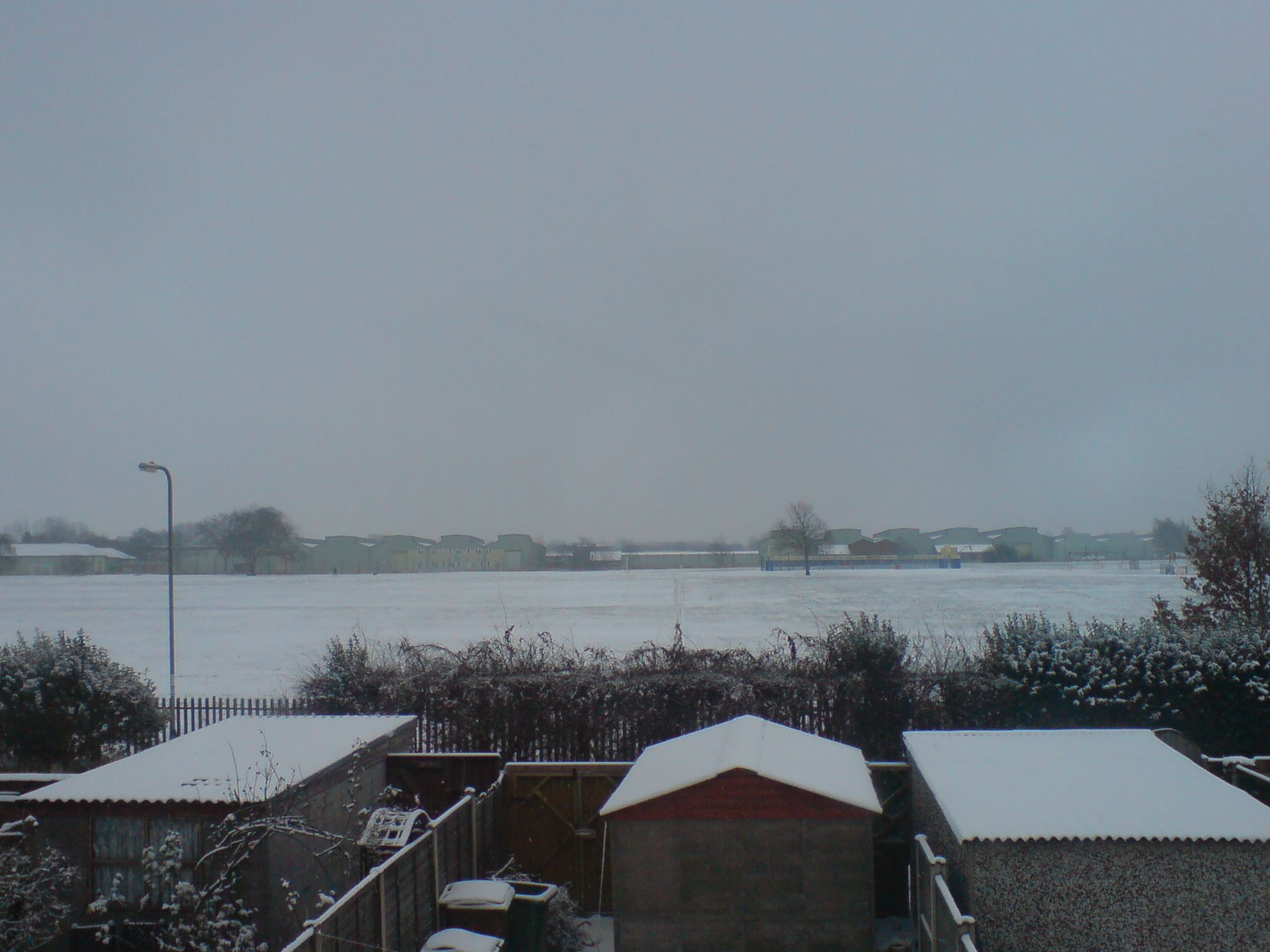
Snow in Stafford, England

The weather system affecting South Wales and south-west England on the evening of the 12th moved onto the Midlands and south-east England where the snow persisted throughout the early hours until around midday, dropping a further 5–10 cm (2-4"). The weather system continued north during the evening, affecting much of Northern England before reaching Scotland.

Many schools were once again closed across England and Wales. There were many road accidents and closures; the M25 motorway was down to one lane between Leatherhead and Reigate whilst roads stretching right across southern Great Britain were untreated, causing problems for commuters. Gatwick and Birmingham airports were closed and many flights were delayed at Heathrow.

Due to a mix of the bitter winter weather and a milder low pressure system attempting to build towards the UK from the Atlantic, heavy snowfall in the United Kingdom resumed, with fresh accumulations, on top of existing snow, of up to 15 centimetres (5.9 in) on 12 January in Wales and South West England. Snow later fell in the Midlands and South-east England.

At some places in northern England, including (Holmfirth and Barnsley), freezing rain or sleet fell onto deep-frozen roads causing significant accumulation of black ice. Some people in the areas worst affected even thought that the only safe way to move about on roads was by crawling. Hospital accident and emergency units in the Sheffield, Rotherham, Doncaster and Barnsley areas of South Yorkshire reported being inundated by people with broken bones and sprains after slipping on what one council official in Sheffield described as the worst black ice seen in the area in living memory.

==== 13 January ====
During 13 January the weather system continued north, affecting much of northern England before reaching Scotland.

==== 14 January ====
Southerly to south-easterly winds brought bands of snow to parts of Scotland and northern England. An inch of snow fell in Glasgow with further accumulations in areas outside the towns and cities, disrupting travel.

==== 15 January ====
On 15 January milder conditions from the Atlantic led to thawing over much of south Wales and southwest England. Further north over north Wales and northwest England, sleet showers on frozen ground overnight caused glazed frost which had largely gone by morning. By midday, rain showers were advancing from the south; the January snowfall was rapidly melting, but the pre-Christmas snowfall, where trodden, had half thawed to slush and then frozen hard to solid ice overnight, was slower to melt. In Scotland it melted fresh snow. Flood warnings were issued as a result.

==== 18–20 January ====
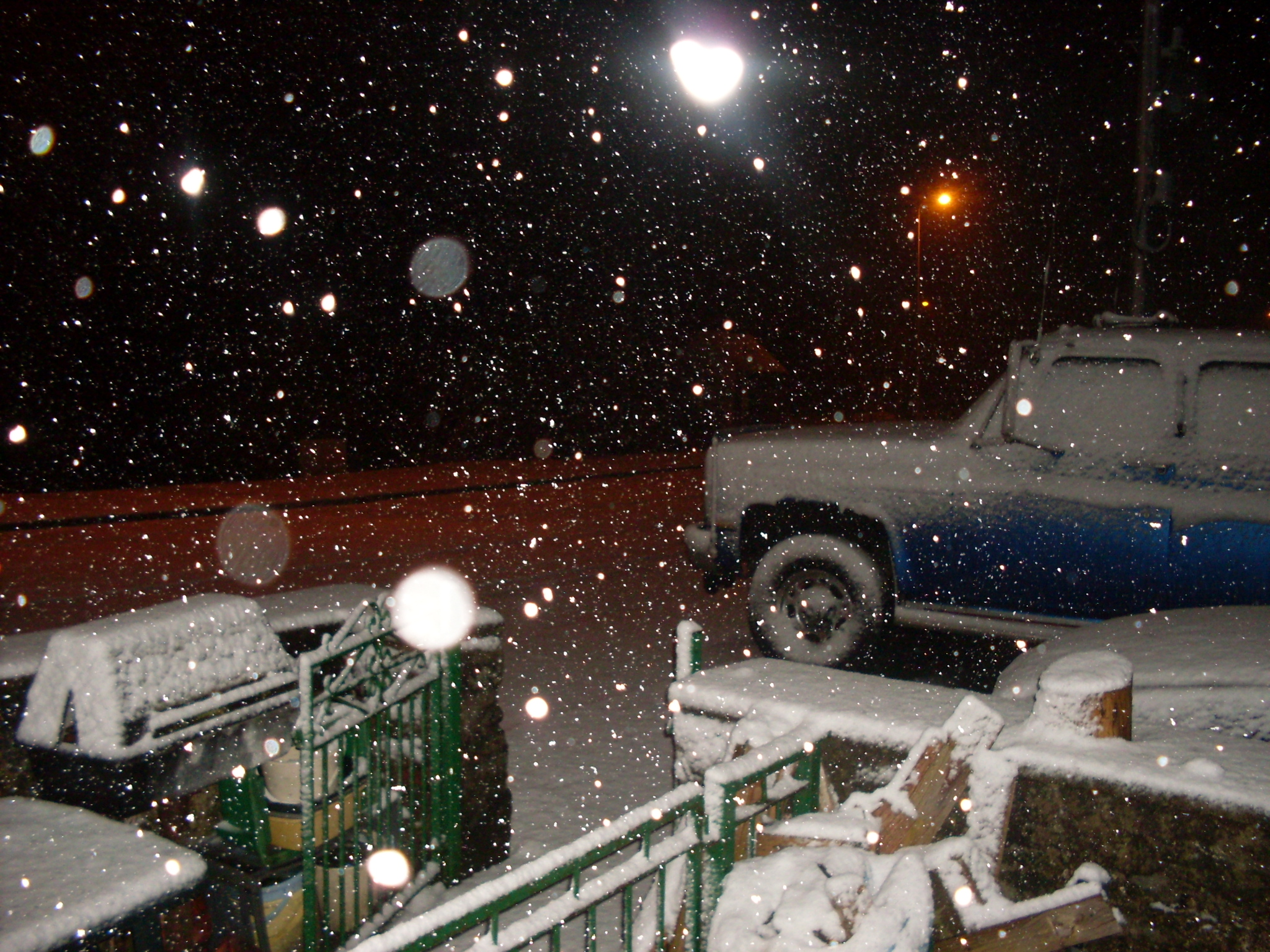
Heavy snowfall during the night in Pant Glas, Gwynedd, on the 20th

It snowed heavily in north and mid Wales and the west Midlands between the 18th and 20th. High winds and snowstorms caused ferocious blizzards over the Welsh mountains, Shropshire hills and the Pennines with disruption leading to closures on the highest roads. Loss of livestock was reported in north Wales and the Midlands. Accumulations of snow up to two feet were reported on the Berwyn range and in Snowdonia.

==== 25 February ====
Widespread snowfall across Scotland brought extreme disruption. 61 cm (24 in) of snow were recorded in Aviemore as hundreds of people were stranded in cars in Dunblane. Schools and transport services disrupted. Two people died in Glen Coe in an avalanche. Temperatures reached −19.2 °C (−2.6 °F) in Braemar. Some people in Perthshire were stranded in their cars for 17 hours. 45,000 homes in Scotland were left without power. 30 schools were closed.

== Effects ==
The Department of Health predicted that up to 40,000 excess deaths could occur because of the coldest weather for over 40 years. The RSA Insurance Group estimated that the cold weather was costing £690 million per day, due to people unable to get to work or deliver goods, among other factors. Extra potholes and burst water pipes are also thought to have cost £61 million and £20 million in repairs. Use of natural gas increased by one-third. By 7 January 2010, 22 people had died in the UK because of the freezing conditions.

=== Transport ===
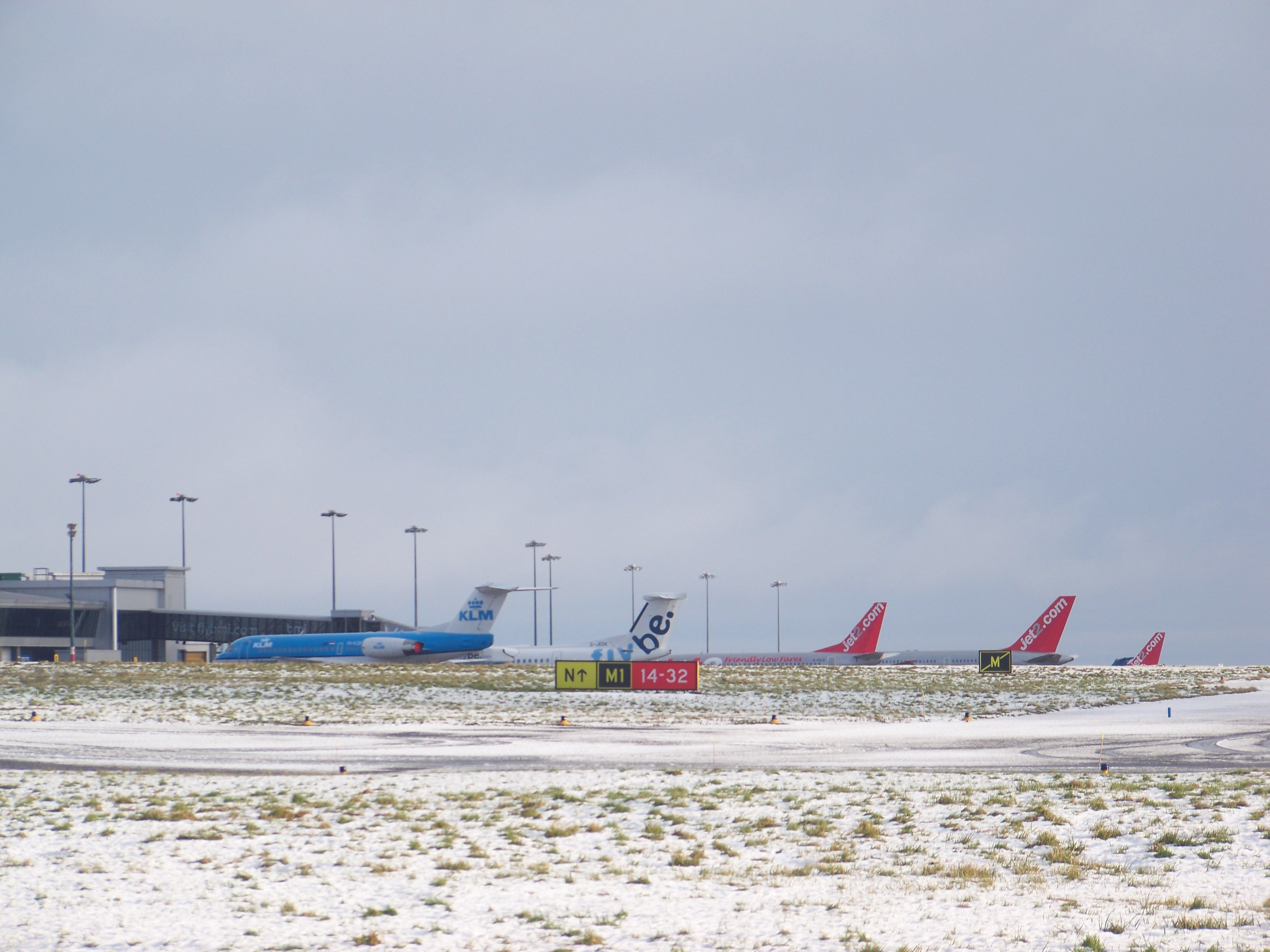
Leeds Bradford Airport, December 2009

- London Gatwick Airport, Heathrow Airport, Manchester Airport, Birmingham Airport, Cardiff Airport, Luton Airport, Belfast City Airport, Southampton Airport, Blackpool Airport, Newcastle Airport, Durham Tees Valley Airport, Exeter International Airport, Plymouth City Airport, London Stansted Airport, Bristol Airport, Leeds Bradford Airport and Robin Hood Airport Doncaster Sheffield were all at some points closed due to the conditions.
- Some train services ran with revised timetables. Trains in Kent were delayed for up to three and a half hours, with hundreds left stranded.
- The A3 road around Horndean (along with the A3(M)) and in the Hindhead area and A1 road were closed. The vast majority of the country suffered disruption, with many minor roads closed and only the main motorways and A-road network passable for much of 5, 6 and 7 January.
- Buses on the Isle of Wight, Gloucester, (where a skeleton service was being run during Wednesday 6 January) and across southern Hampshire were suspended on 5 January owing to heavy snowfall, leaving a large number of people stranded. Limited services were back in operation on 7 January in Southampton and Portsmouth on the mainland and between Newport and the other main towns on the Isle of Wight. All services in Gosport, Fareham, Locks Heath, Titchfield, Whiteley and Warsash areas were suspended and remained so for two days because of the road condition. As of 8 January, one service was running between Gosport and Fareham and one between Fareham and Southampton, though this service was unable to serve Locks Heath or Titchfield.
- In late December, Eurostar trains from Paris or Brussels towards St. Pancras station were severely delayed, with delays of up to 16 hours. All Eurostar services were cancelled from 19 to 21 December.
- Aberdeen Airport was briefly closed because of icy weather.
- Cardiff Airport was closed temporarily on 6 January.
- In North East England A1(M) and A19 suffered adverse conditions, mainly on evenings as a result of temperatures dropping to well below zero. Bus services between Newcastle and Sunderland suffered some disruptions, as local operators suspended services. Local and minor roads were severely effected.
- The section of the A635 going over the Pennines was closed for just under two months, the longest time of road closure in the UK.

=== Sport ===
The snowfall in January postponed football games in the English Football League, Premier League, Football League Cup and FA Cup. There were further postponements in Scotland with fifteen football matches being postponed on 2 January. Football in Wales and Northern Ireland was also affected. In rugby union, there were cancellations in the English Premiership, Celtic League, the All-Ireland League, the Top 14, a Heineken Cup fixture in Brussels scheduled for 19 December and a Heineken Cup fixture in Newport. Other affected sports included Gaelic football's O'Byrne Cup, Dr McKenna Cup, McGrath Cup and FBD League games. The field hockey Irish Junior Cup saw postponements and the prestigious schools cross-country event, the Knole run, was cancelled due to heavy snow on the ground.

== See also ==
- December 2009 North American blizzard
- Winter storms of 2009–10 in East Asia
- Winter storms of 2009–2010
- February 2009 British Isles snowfall
- Winter of 1962–1963 in the United Kingdom
- 1987 United Kingdom and Ireland cold wave
- Winter of 2010–11 in Europe
- The Man Who Slipped on the Ice
