= The Man Who Slipped on the Ice =

2010 Irish viral video

Coordinates: 53°20′51.2″N 6°16′30.0″W

Man slipping on ice on Church Street close to Four Courts in Dublin

On 8 January 2010, during a RTÉ Six One News report, a pedestrian slipped on ice in Dublin, Ireland, close to the Four Courts. The man became known as "The Man Who Slipped on the Ice" after the video of him slipping and falling went viral online, gaining several million views on YouTube and the website of RTÉ, Ireland's national broadcaster. Several Facebook groups were created to identify the man, although his true identity still remains uncertain. It is considered one of the "most iconic" clips of Irish television history and an icon of Irish pop culture. Ten years later, on 8 January 2020, Coors Light erected a temporary plaque at the location in Dublin to mark the incident's tenth anniversary.

== Incident ==
During the winter of 2009–10 in Ireland (the coldest since 1987), John Kilraine reported on a man slipping and falling on the ice, shouting "Oh shit" as he fell. The video was recorded on Church Street close to the Four Courts in Dublin. The video was part of RTÉ's early evening news broadcast Six One showing the effects of inclement weather and how Dublin City Council was working on removing partly melted snow from the streets. The report was issued by Bryan Dobson. The event was recorded by Colm McCaughey after he set up his camera on Church Street and filmed the fall. After the man slipped, McCaughey ran over to check whether or not the man who fell was hurt; the man refused a cup of tea at a nearby office and rushed home. McCaughey later tweeted that the man was Korean or Chinese. When the video was shown during the news report, Kilraine stated that "Dublin pavements remain very dangerous, although this man was not seriously hurt." Afterwards, the video of the man falling quickly became viral online.

== Legacy ==
Several Facebook groups were created to identify the man, and many claimed to be him. Sasha Brady of the Irish Independent reported that a Facebook site called "We have found the RTE fall guy" [sic] identified the man as hailing from Navan, County Meath. However, the man's identity is still uncertain.

In 2013, The Man Who Slipped on the Ice placed second in a The Herald survey on the most popular Irish YouTube clips, only losing to the first performance of Riverdance at the Eurovision Song Contest 1994. On 8 January 2020, Coors Light erected a temporary plaque at the site of the incident to mark the tenth anniversary of the event as part of a promotional effort. The plaque read: "In honour of 'The guy who slipped on the ice' on RTÉ News 8 January 2010, your memory lives on" In 2021, the video was played at the start of the sixth season of RTÉ's Reeling in the Years. In 2025, "Man who slipped on the ice" was included in the Irish culture book The A-Z of Being Irish.

Ian Mangan of Dublin Live wrote that RTÉ's broadcast of the clip on "Reeling in the Years" prompted nostalgic reactions from viewers, and he described the man who slipped on the ice as a "true Irish icon". Offaly Express reported that the video was one of the "most-watched RTE News clips of all-time" and that Coors Light's plaque was paying "tribute to a legend". In 2026, Colum Motherway of Extra.ie regarded it as "one of the most iconic moments in Irish television history" and said that "The footage of the man's slip has likely been seen by nearly everyone in the country at this stage" Motherway also said that the clip would be shared on social media when temperatures dropped. The Daily Edge said that the man "became a national symbol of the struggle of the Irish winter" and that they were convinced Niall Kelly, affiliated with their own publication, was the person that fell, although Kelly has denied these claims.

The incident also inspired a mockumentary by Tom Walsh and Kevin McGahern about the aftermath of the incident and how the man handled the resulting attention. In the mockumentary, the man is identified as "Brendan Adhere".

== See also ==
- Kkongkkong
- Conrad (raccoon)
