= Hammond Lane, Dublin =

Street in Dublin, Ireland

Hammond Lane
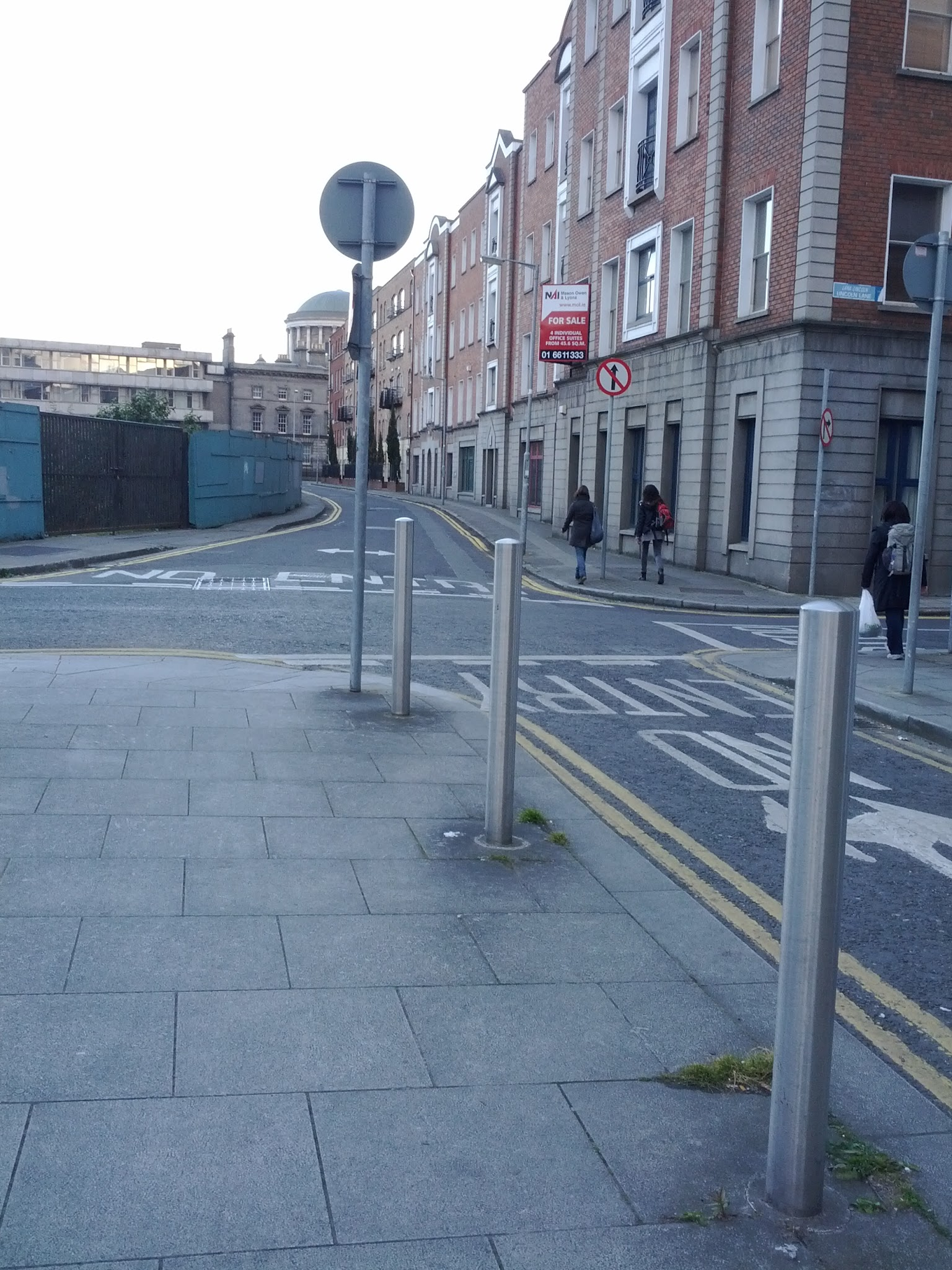
- Hammond Lane, looking east, in 2012
- Interactive map of Hammond Lane
- Native name: Lána an Chrochaire (Irish)
- Former names: Hangman Lane, Hamon Lane
- Location: Dublin, Ireland
- Postal code: D07
- Coordinates: 53°20′49″N 6°16′37″W
- East end: Church Street
- South end: Lincoln Lane

Hammond Lane (Irish: Lána an Chrochaire) is a street in Dublin which connects Church Street to the east and Lincoln Lane to the west.

== History ==
Hammond Lane was previously known as Hangman Lane, and later Hamon Lane, before the name Hammond Lane was applied. Hangman Lane first appears on maps from 1698, and the name possibly derived from the route condemned prisoners would take to be hanged in Stoneybatter.

In 1878, Dublin's worst industrial accident occurred on Hammond Lane, when a boiler exploded and killed 14 people. The accident happened at the site of Messrs Strong, a large foundry and ironworks in the nineteenth century. In the afternoon of 27 April 1878, a large explosion was heard, and panic spread in the area. The steam boiler at Strong's foundry had exploded, partially demolishing the front wall of the foundry. As the explosion took place around 1:30pm, many of the employees were on their lunch break. Duffy's public house, across from the foundry was destroyed in the explosion, and killing Patrick Duffy, the publican, and two of his children. Two tenements were also destroyed in the blast. An engineer's report cited lack of maintenance of the boiler, and that corrosion had weakened it.

Hammond Lane Foundry Company was founded in 1902 and originally located on Hammond Lane, but later moved to Sir John Rogerson's Quay, and then to Pigeon House Road, Ringsend.

The large site along the northern side of the street has been subject to archaeological excavations, and been earmarked for development as part of the larger Four Courts complex encompassing a family court. However the site remained empty and undeveloped for many years, with work commencing on site in 2024.
