= Constitution Hill, Dublin =

Street in Dublin, Ireland

Constitution Hill
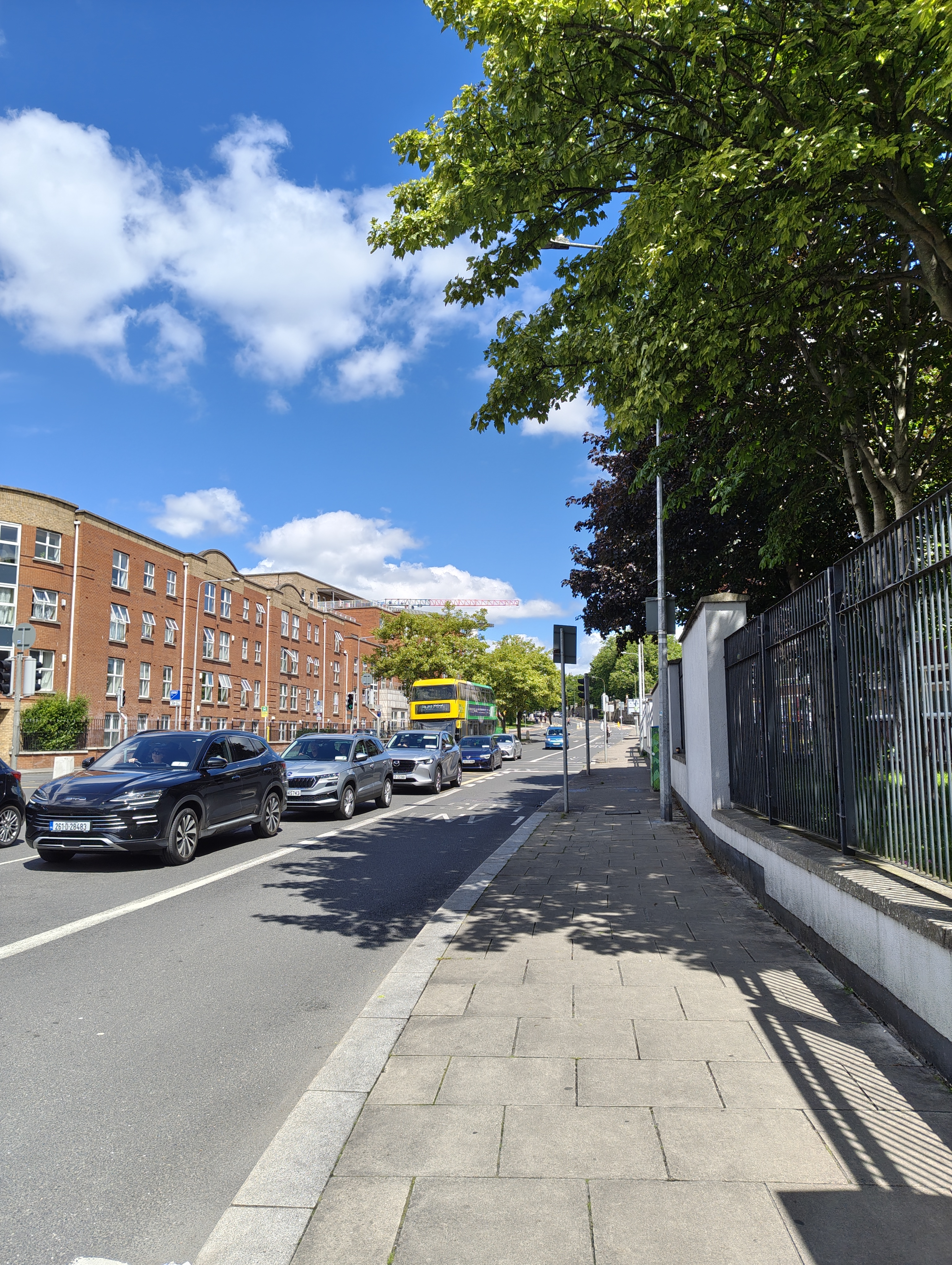
- Constitution Hill looking north towards Broadstone
- Interactive map of Constitution Hill
- Native name: Cnoc an Bhunreachta (Irish)
- Former names: Glassmanogue, North Townsend Street
- Namesake: Constitution Hill, London
- Location: Dublin, Ireland
- Postal code: D07
- Coordinates: 53°21′13″N 6°16′22″W
- north end: Phibsborough Road
- Major junctions: Western Way
- south end: Church Street, Coleraine Street

Other
- Known for: King's Inns

Constitution Hill (Irish: Cnoc an Bhunreachta) is a street in Dublin, Ireland.

== History ==
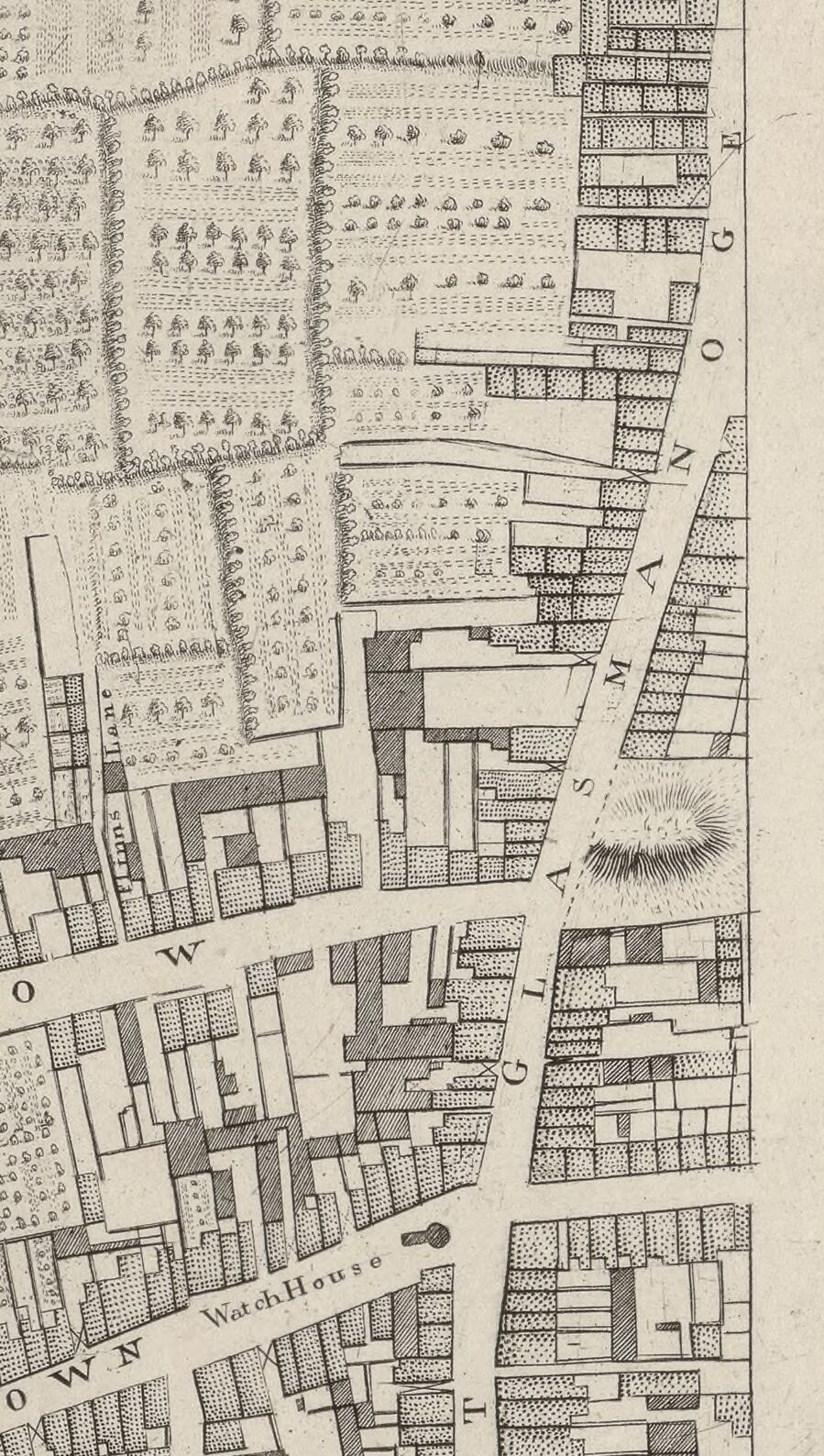
Glassmanogue, as mapped by Rocque

Constitution Hill appears on John Rocque's 1756 map as Glassmanogue, meaning "Glas mo Canoc" or Canoc's Stream referring to the river Bradogue which ran through the areas of Broadstone and Constitution Hill. This river is now entirely underground. The street was later known as North Townsend Street, and was renamed Constitution Hill due to its proximity to King's Inns which runs along the eastern edge of Constitution Hill with parkland and railings laid out around 1846 facing the street.

The spur of the Royal Canal Broadstone Branch and Harbour was located on Constitution Hill and was constructed in the 18th and 19th centuries, and was facilitated by the diversion of the Bradogue river. The Foster Aqueduct spanned the street. The harbour was filled in 1877, and the canal was closed to navigation in 1961. A playground was built near the Broadstone Terminus in 1915.

The three 1960s blocks of council flats that face King's Inns are being retrofitted and the area redeveloped under Dublin City Council regeneration plans.
