= Kkongkkong =

South Korean cat (born c. 2019)

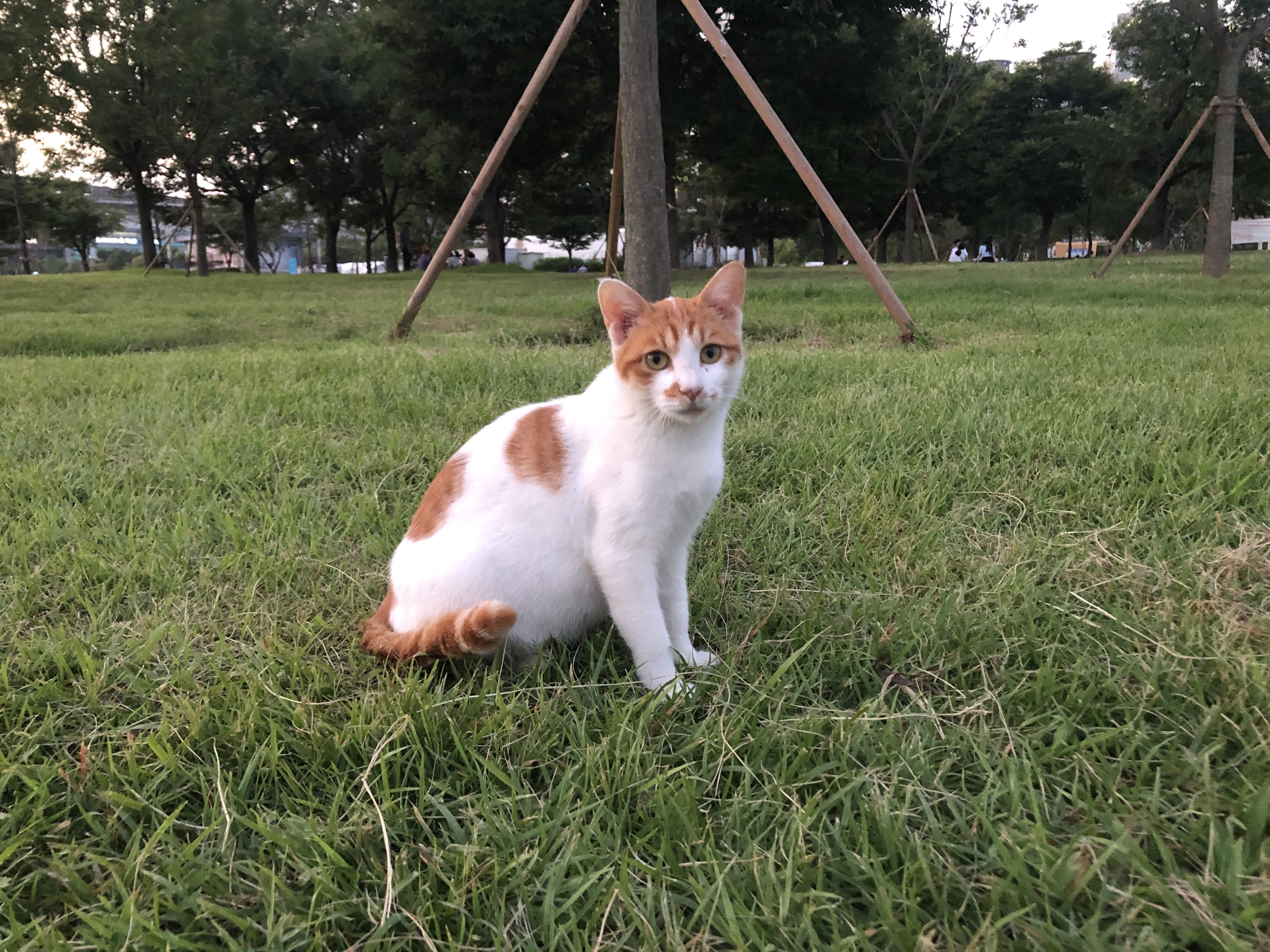
- Kkongkkong in September 2020
- Species: Domestic cat (Felis catus)
- Sex: Female
- Born: c. 2019 (age 6–7); Likely Seoul, South Korea
- Known for: Viral Internet meme
- Owner: Lee Dong-hak

Korean name
- Hangul: 꽁꽁
- RR: Kkongkkong
- MR: Kkongkkong
- www.instagram.com/kkongdaddy/

Kkongkkong (Korean: 꽁꽁; born c. 2019) is a South Korean cat who is the subject of an internet meme called "on top of the completely frozen Han River walks a cat" (꽁꽁 얼어붙은 한강 위로 고양이가 걸어다닙니다; kkongkkong eoreobuteun Hangang wiro goyangiga georeodanimnida).

She was born as a stray cat, possibly around 2019. In 2021, a news broadcast with a clip of her became an internet meme and, later, a dance challenge that major South Korean celebrities participated in. In 2025, she was found and adopted by journalist Lee Dong-hak (이동학), who had filmed the video clip that became the subject of the meme.

== Biography ==
Kkongkkong (name given to her by her current owner) is believed to have been born around 2019 as a stray cat in Seoul. Her estimated birth year is based on research by her current owner, video journalist Lee Dong-hak, who found photos on social media of her as a kitten dating back to around that period. Lee also found a 2021 record of her being spayed, with the record estimating her age at around 3 years old. The record said that she was in the early stages of pregnancy at the time.

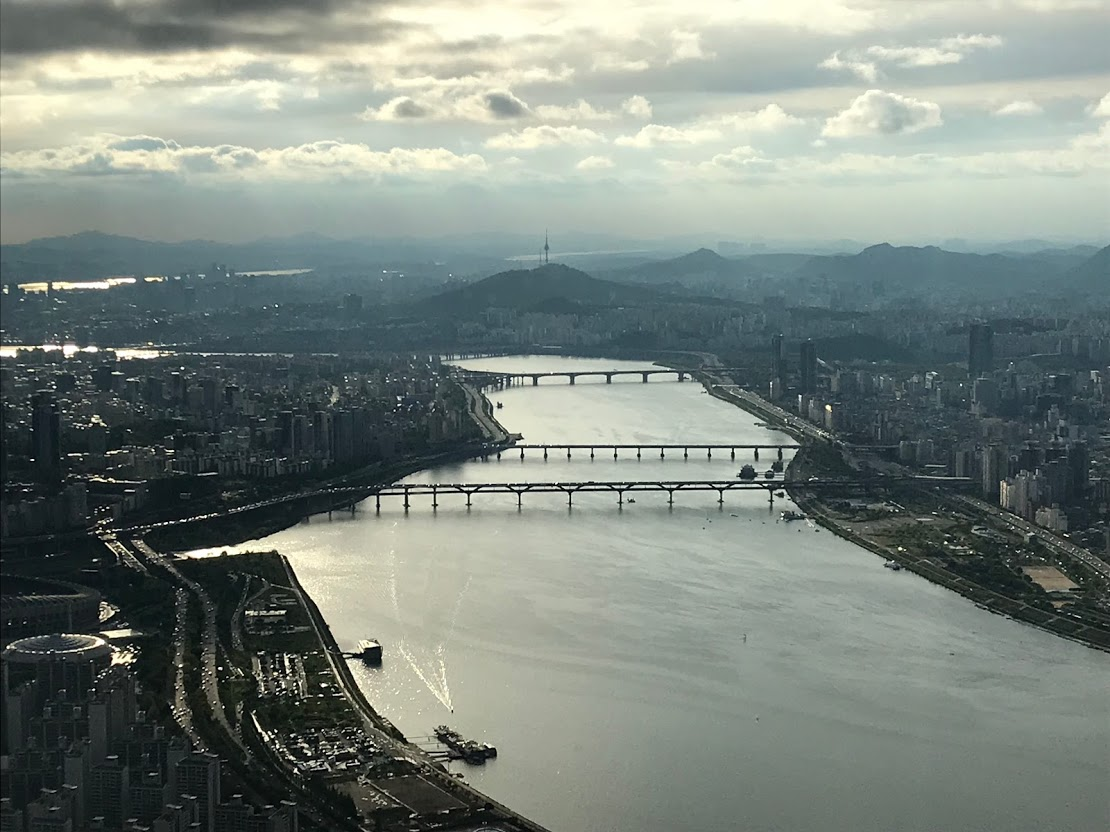
Kkongkkong became an Internet meme after being seen walking on the frozen Han River in Seoul.

In December 2021, Lee filmed a clip for a news broadcast for Maeil Broadcasting Network (MBN) of Kkongkkong walking on the frozen Han River in Seoul. In order to emphasize how cold the weather was, fellow journalist Lee Si-yeol (이시열) dubbed the following line over the clip: "on top of the completely frozen Han River walks a cat". Their segment aired on December 27, 2021, and soon became popular online, with the video and audio being remixed and edited into various humorous forms. Lee Si-yeol's use of the onomatopoeia kkongkkong (꽁꽁), which is used to indicate that something has frozen solid, as well as the rhythmic cadence of his line, drew particular attention. The meme saw a surge in popularity in early 2024. A song remix of the audio and video became an online dance challenge, with numerous major celebrities like IU and brands like Kakao Friends participating. Both Lees participated in the challenge themselves.

Musical artist Chuu performing the dance challenge at the Tech University of Korea in September 2024

Later, a person uploaded a photo to social media of Kkongkkong in Ttukseom Hangang Park. They were able to recognize Kkongkkong because of the pattern on her coat. Lee Dong-hak saw the post and, worried about Kkongkkong's potentially shorter lifespan in the outdoors, decided to try to adopt her. He researched how to take care of a cat. For two weeks, he approached Kkongkkong in the park with food; he claims to have seen and fed her every day of those two weeks. Finally, in the second week of January 2025, he set a baited trap for Kkongkkong. After a day of waiting, Kkongkkong entered it, and Lee took her back to his home.

Lee named her Kkongkkong, after the onomatopoeia that drew attention in her meme. His coworkers raised money to help pay for her medical treatment. Kkongkkong reportedly took around a month to feel comfortable walking around Lee's home. By August, while she was comfortable with receiving some pets and being hand-fed treats, Lee felt she was still skittish.

In August, he began uploading videos to YouTube that document his process of finding and caring for her. The videos quickly went viral, accumulating hundreds of thousands of views within days. Some commenters reportedly praised Lee for adopting Kkongkkong and described their story as feeling heartwarming and fateful.

Kkongkkong and Lee were subjects of the 31 October 2025 episode of the television program Take Care of My Cat.

== See also ==
- The Man Who Slipped on the Ice
