= Church Street, Dublin =

Street in central Dublin, Ireland

Church Street
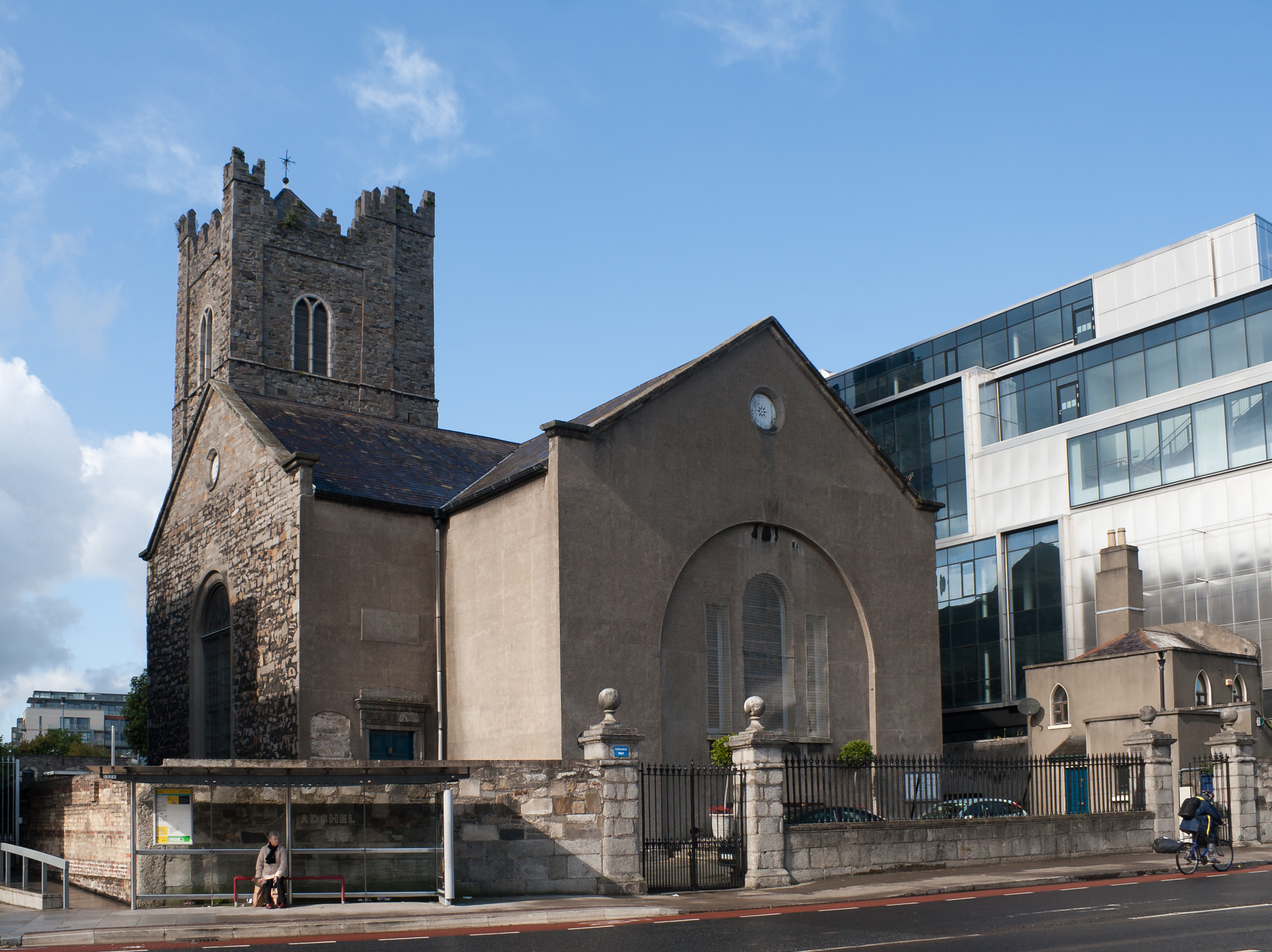
- St Michan's church as viewed from Church Street with an adjacent modern office block
- Interactive map of Church Street
- Native name: Sráid an Teampaill (Irish)
- Namesake: St. Michan's Church
- Postal code: D07
- south end: Father Mathew Bridge
- Major junctions: Inns Quay; North Brunswick Street; North King Street
- north end: Constitution Hill

Church Street (Irish: Sráid an Teampaill) is a street in Dublin, Ireland, which dates back to at least Early Scandinavian Dublin.

== History ==
In the early history of Dublin, Church Street was the main unplanned thoroughfare of Oxmanstown, an area that developed outside of the walled city, on the northern side of the River Liffey near the old crossing point of the ford of the hurdles from which Dublin gets its name. Today this is approximately the location of Father Mathew Bridge and this route continued north along the route of present day Dorset Street becoming the Slíghe Chualann which lead to Tara.

It is believed to have taken its name from the chapel on the street from 1095 on which St. Michan's Church was built. The area likely expanded significantly after the Anglo-Norman invasion of Ireland and the expulsion or voluntary removal of the Norse–Gaels from the old city.

By the thirteenth century, there were numerous ironworks, markets and slaughterhouses. The street later appears clearly on John Speed's Map of Dublin (1610). Some of the houses on Church Street have elements dating back to the 1740s.

By the eighteenth century, the area was one of Dublin's most densely populated and poorest, and this reputation and deprivation continued into the 1800s. The printer of the Gentleman's and Citizen's Almanac, John Watson Stewart (1762-1822), lived at 1 Church Street.

In 1878, Dublin's worst industrial accident occurred adjacent to Church Street, when a boiler exploded and killed 14 people. The accident happened at Hammond Lane, at the south end of the street. A site at Hammond Lane has been earmarked for development as part of the larger Four Courts complex encompassing a family court but has remained empty for several years.

The mural, 'Horse Boy', by Subset is at the intersection of Church Street and Stirrup Lane and is inspired by the area's proximity to the Smithfield Horse Fair.

=== Church Street disaster (1913) ===
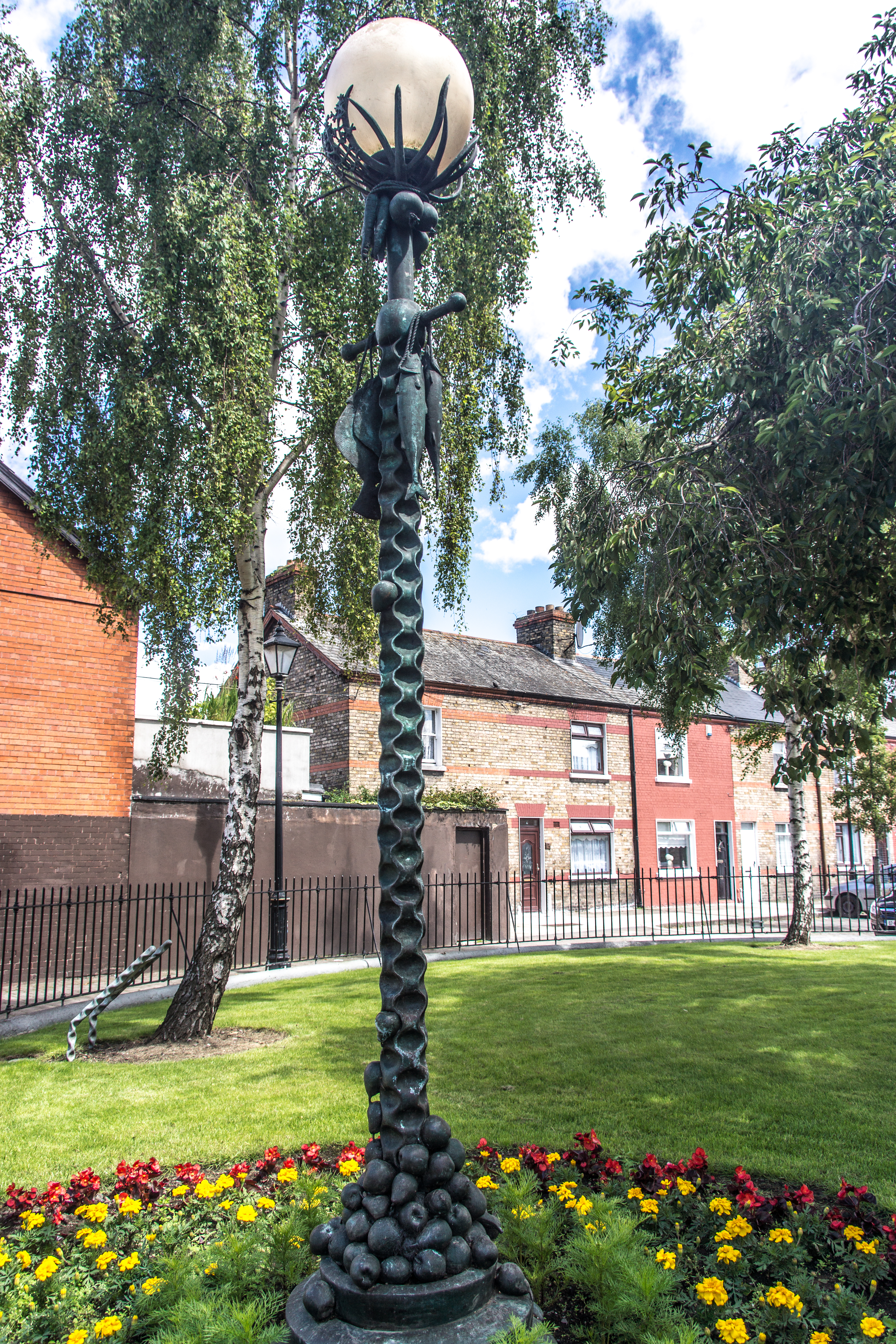
The Green Light (Solas na Glasraí) by Rachel Joynt which depicts fish, fruit, weights and fruit packaging

On Tuesday 2 September 1913, two tenement buildings, numbers 66 and 67, collapsed at 8:45pm. Twenty-five people from five families lived in number 66 alone. It is believed that the chimney collapsed, falling through the building while pushing the front elevation onto the street. Seven people died in the collapse, including four children. The buildings were directly across from the church of the Capuchin Order, St Mary of the Angels Church. The safety of the buildings had been questioned in July 1911, and minor repairs were made. The disaster attracted a lot of national and international press, as it happened during the 1913 Lockout. One of the victims, Hugh Sammon, had been locked out of work the day before the collapse.

An inquiry into the collapse detailed that 16 members of the Dublin Corporation owned 89 tenements or "second-class houses" between them.

The wider area was redeveloped into local authority housing as the Church Street Housing Scheme, with Alderman Thomas Kelly largely credited with this development, working with C.J. McCarthy, the Dublin City Architect. This public housing scheme was one of a number that marked a turn in political attitudes to housing in Dublin in the early 20th century. A memorial now marks the spot of the collapse.

== Capuchin Order ==
The Capuchin Order has had a presence around Church Street since 1691. The first chapel was fitted into Roscommon House in 1720 and later entirely repaired in 1736. It was replaced by a larger chapel in 1796 which had its main entrance via Bow Street.

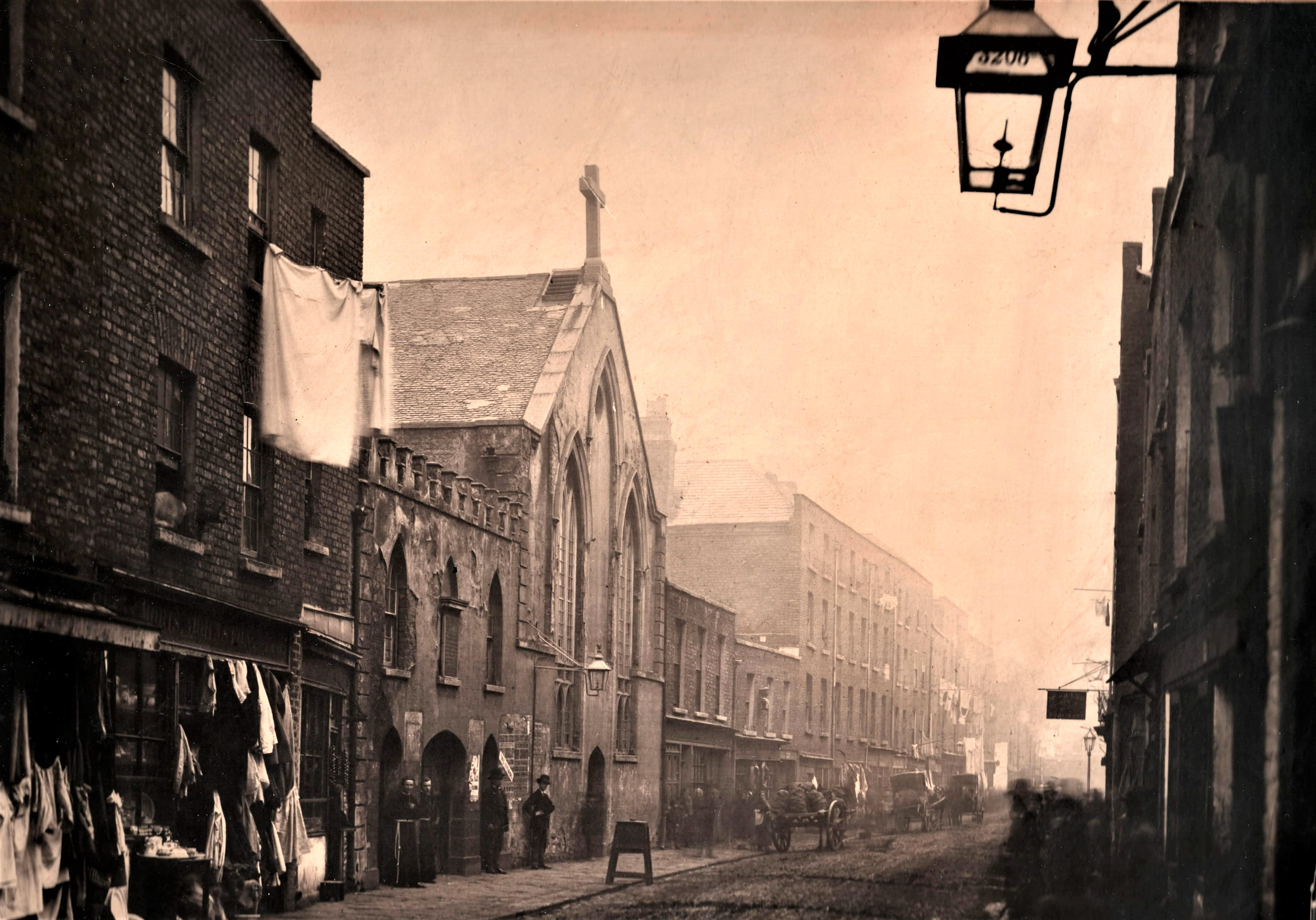
Church Street Chapel, Dublin in around 1861.

=== Saint Mary of the Angels ===
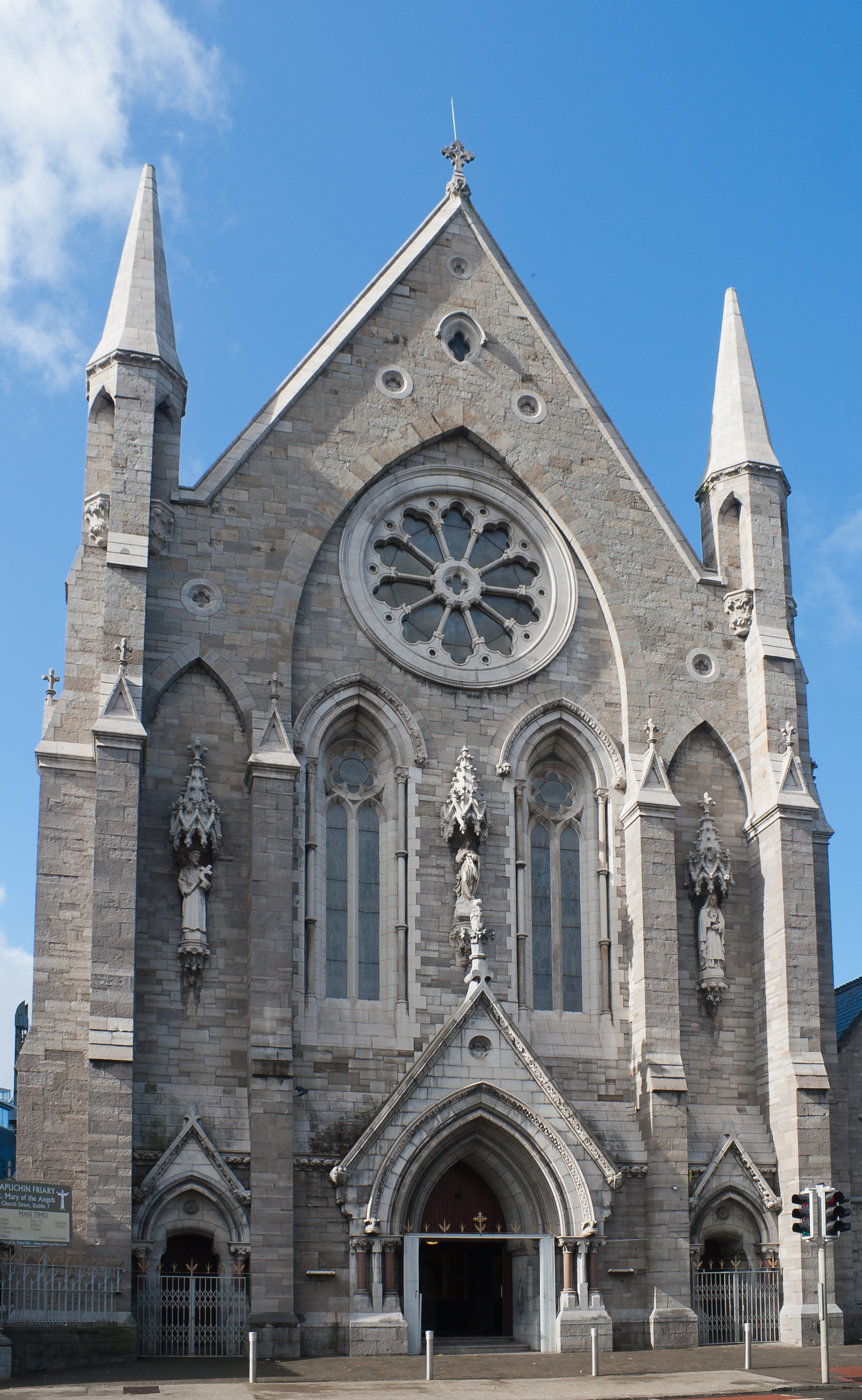
Saint Mary of the Angels in 2012.

Saint Mary of the Angels, Capuchin Church was built as a replacement church on the site of the old Church Street chapel. The foundation stone was laid on 12 June 1868 and the church was completed in 1881. It was designed by J.J. McCarthy, and features sculptures from Leo Broe and work from James Pearse (father of Patrick Pearse).

In 1891, the Father Matthew Hall was opened as a temperance social club. The Hall hosted meetings of the Gaelic League, and was a field hospital and kitchen during the Easter Rising in 1916. It also could be one of the oldest cinematic venues in Dublin, with advertisements dating from October 1909.

Since the 1960s, the Capuchin Day Centre has been offering free meals and was founded by Kevin Crowley.
