= Countess Markiewicz House =

Apartment building in Dublin, Ireland

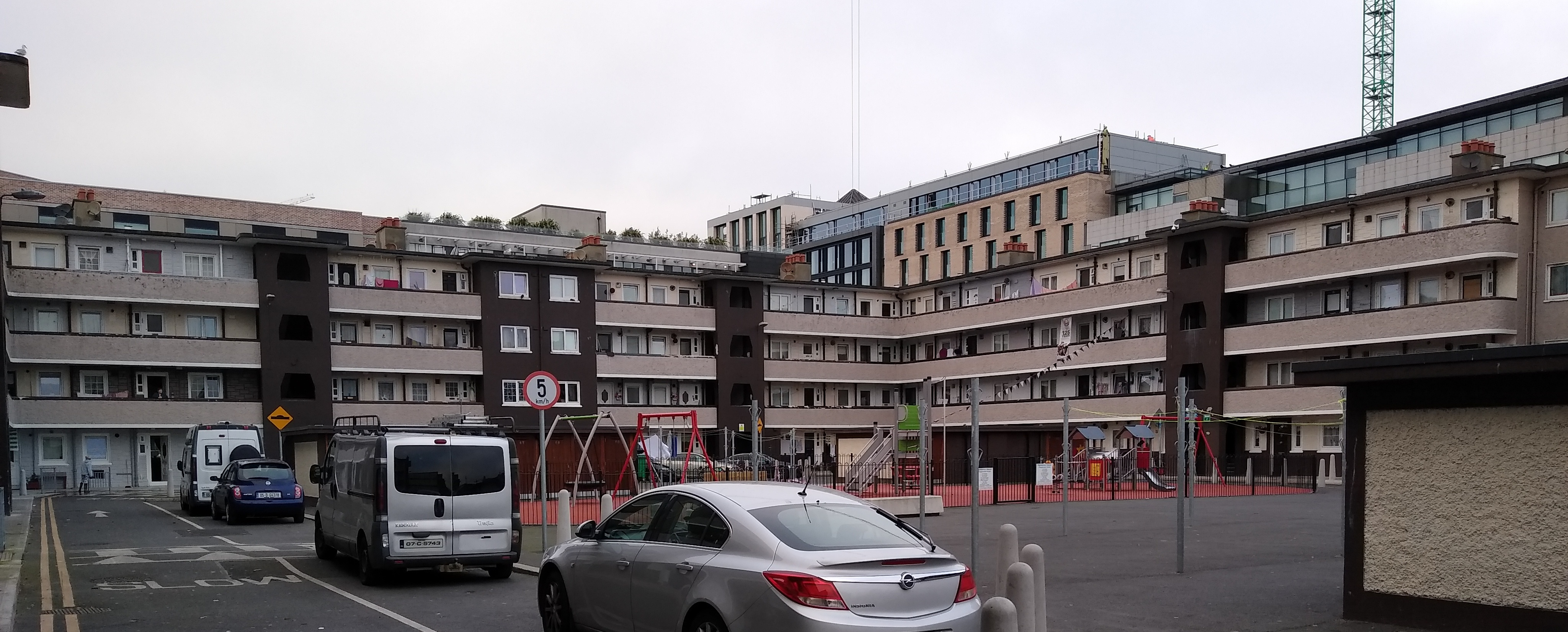
- Interactive map of the Countess Markiewicz House area
- Alternative names: Countess Markiewicz flats, Markiewicz House

General information
- Location: 115 - 140 Townsend Street, Mark's Lane, Dublin 2, Dublin, Ireland
- Coordinates: 53.34527°N 6.25022°W
- Named for: Countess Constance Markievicz
- Construction started: 1934
- Construction stopped: 1936

Design and construction
- Architect: Herbert George Simms

Countess Markiewicz House is a flats complex named after Countess Constance Markievicz in Dublin 2, Ireland. It was designed by Herbert George Simms in an art deco style and was constructed between 1934 and 1936. It is one of many examples of twentieth-century housing designed by Simms in Dublin and is listed on the record of protected structures.

== Buildings ==
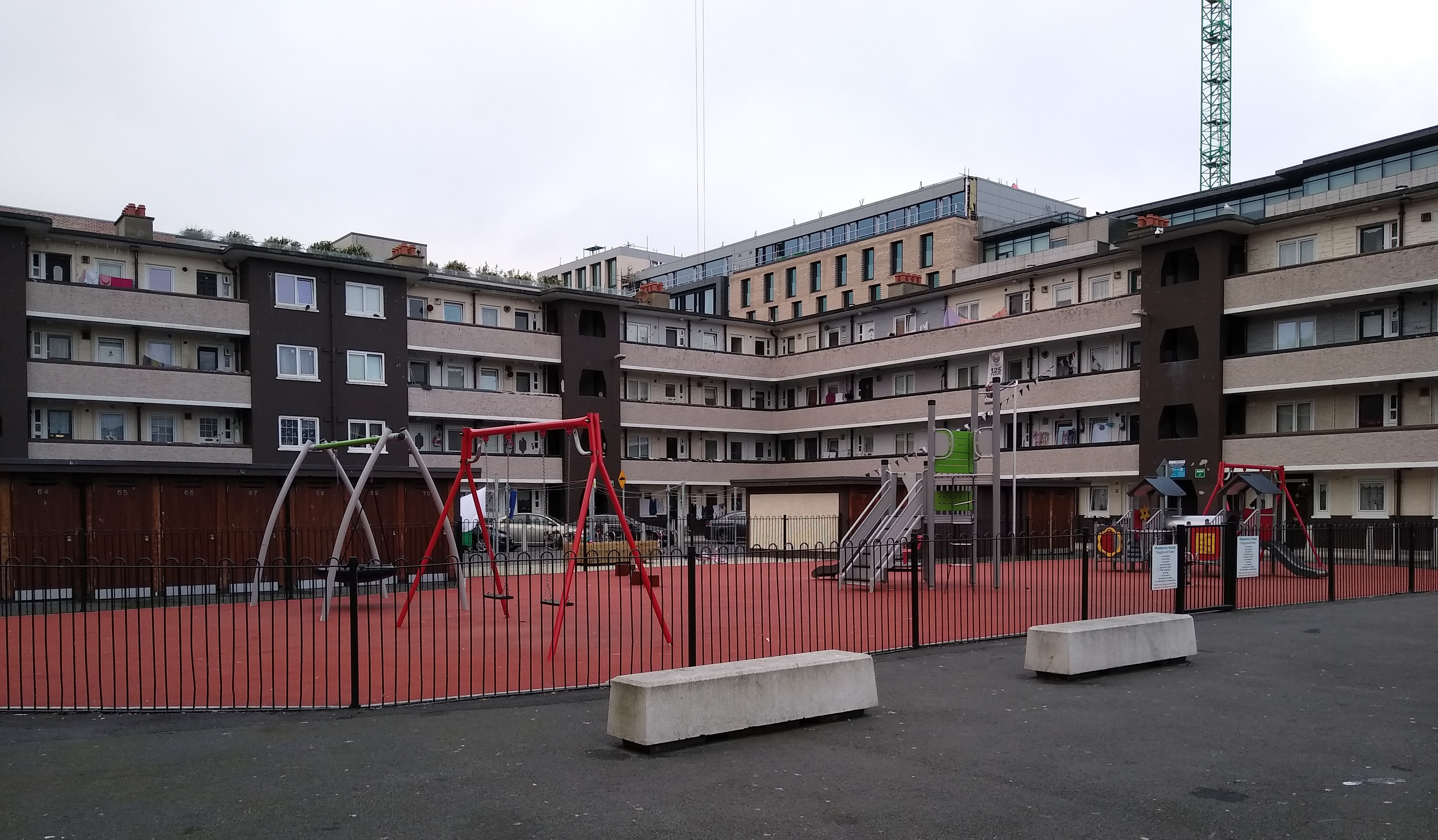
Play area with the larger building in the background

The buildings consist of a two detached four story blocks. The smaller block, to the southeast, is on Mark's Lane. The larger block has three sides and is U-shaped.

Most exterior brickwork is red with a small number of yellow bricks. The roof is flat.

There is a mild steel fence on the north, west and south sides of the buildings.

There is a play area as well as parking in the area between the two arms of the larger building.

== Location ==
The buildings are between Townsend street on the north and Mark's Lane to the south, and Lombard Street East and Mark Street to the west and east.

== Proposed demolition ==
In May 2018 it was suggested the buildings, along with Oliver Bond flats and Chancery Place flats would be delisted and possibly demolished. The Dublin City Council Head of Housing, Brendan Kenny, said it would be difficult to get government funding for refurbishing housing complexes over 40 years old and suggested delisting them as it would be difficult to properly retrofit them. The Green Party rejected the proposals, calling on DCC officials to withdraw them. Councillors and DCC officials agree that the flats are in serious need of refurbishment. In November 2018 media reports that Markiewicz House and Pearse House were to be demolished led to criticism from Irish Civic Trust, Jim Fitzpatrick and former Irish Times environmental editor Frank McDonald criticised the proposal, with McDonald saying "demolition of these flats would be a grotesque waste of resources". Brendan Kenny tweeted that the council had "no plans" to demolish them and that "These complexes are listed and cannot be demolished".

As of April 2021 the buildings are still on the Record of Protected Structures.
