= River House (Dublin) =

Former brutalist office building in Dublin, Ireland

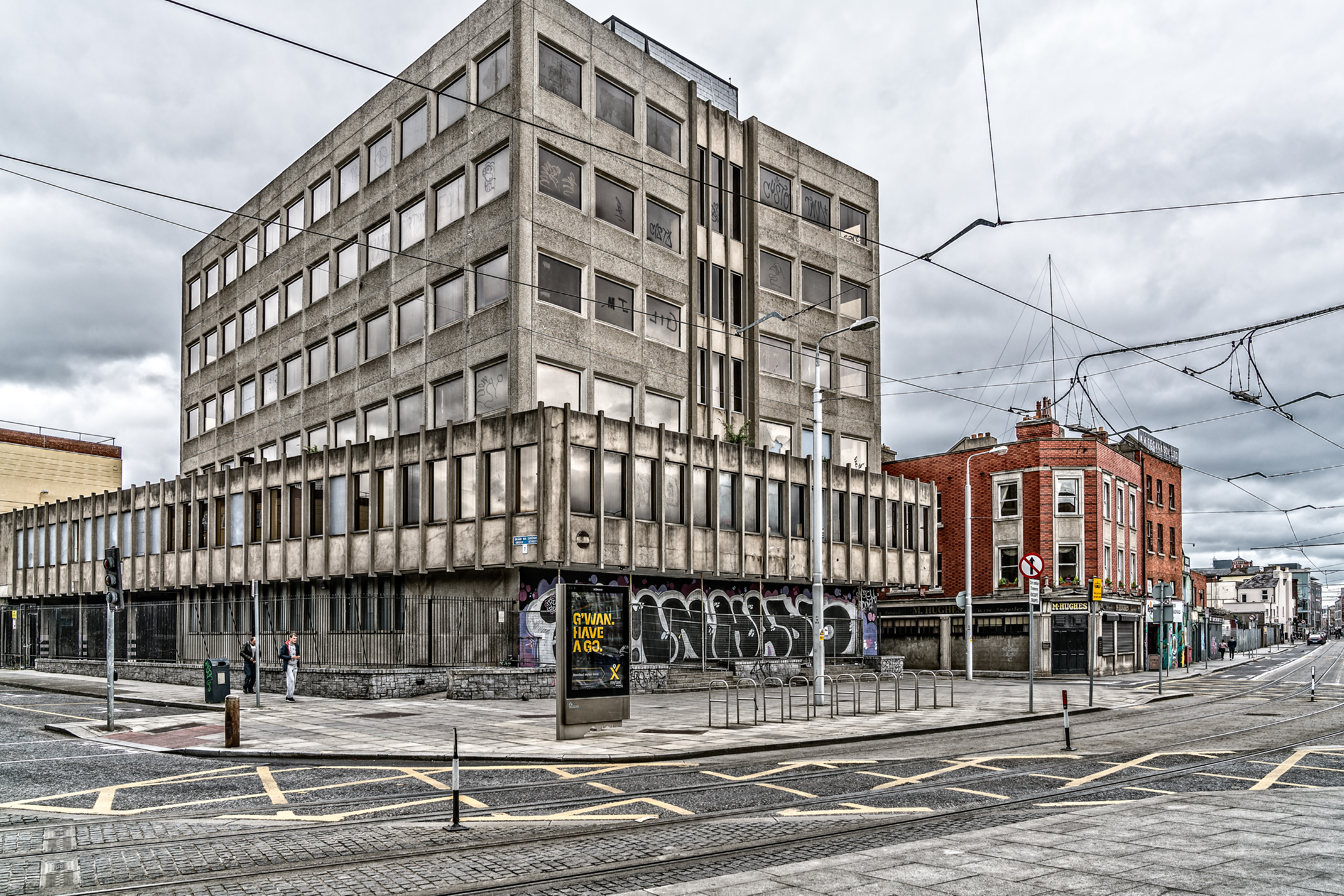

- Location within Central Dublin

General information
- Location: 21/25 Chancery Street/Greek Street, Dublin, Ireland
- Coordinates: 53.34675°N 6.27243°W
- Completed: 1973

Technical details
- Floor count: 5

Design and construction
- Architecture firm: Patrick J. Sheahan and Partners

River House was a 5-storey office block on Chancery Street, Dublin, Ireland. It was described as a "brutalist eyesore" by the Sunday Times.

== History ==
Permission to build River House was granted in 1972, and the building was completed in 1973. It had curtain walling at ground and 1st floor levels, with 4 additional storeys above with pre-cast cladding. The architect of the building has been disputed. Frank McDonald attributed it to John Thompson and Partners, but this led to a libel suit during which it was stated that "neither John or David Thompson of the firm John Thompson and Partners had anything to do with the design or erection of River House". It appears to have been the work of Patrick J. Sheahan and Partners. It was sited across the road from Chancery House.

After a dispute between the Department of Justice and the Dublin Corporation as to who would occupy the building, the corporation established its motor tax office in the office block, and for many years it was Dublin's only motor tax office. The building stood vacant from the late 2000s, and attracted anti-social behaviour.

River House was described as "scourge" to the area, and "is considered to be of little or no architectural merit". It was recorded by the Dublin City Council as a dangerous building in February 2016.

== Demolition and redevelopment ==
River House was initially purchased by Joe and Patrick Linders, who were involved in the redevelopment of parts of the Smithfield area. The building was purchased by Melonmount Ltd in 2017 for €8 million, and permission was sought to demolish it and replace it with a hotel. The financier, Derek Quinlan, was an advisor on the deal. An Taisce have been critical of the proposed replacement building, describing it as "monolithic" and "lumpen". River House was demolished in 2018.

== See also ==
- Hawkins House (Dublin)
- Apollo House (Dublin)
- Lansdowne House, Dublin
- Setanta Centre
