= Chancery House, Dublin =

Apartment complex in Dublin, Ireland

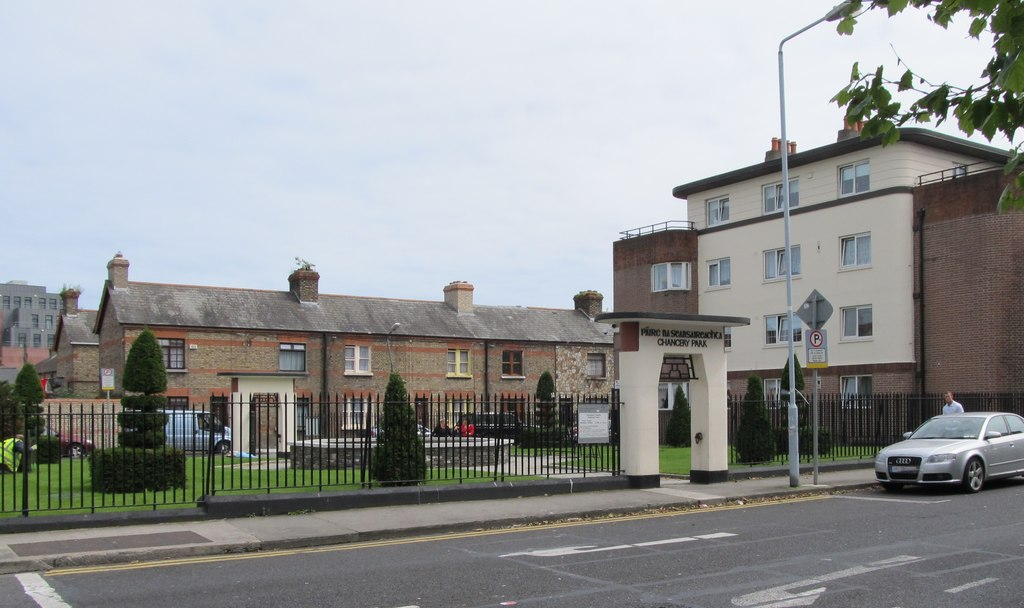
- Chancery Park (left) and Chancery House (right)

- Location within Central Dublin
- Alternative names: Chancery Park Housing Scheme, Chancery Place Flats, Chancery Place Complex

General information
- Architectural style: Art Deco
- Location: Chancery Place, Dublin, Ireland
- Coordinates: 53.3463°N 6.2722°W
- Current tenants: occupied
- Groundbreaking: unknown
- Completed: 1935; 91 years ago
- Owner: Dublin Corporation

Technical details
- Floor count: four-storey

Design and construction
- Architect: Herbert George Simms
- Developer: G&T Crampton

Chancery House (Irish: Teach na Seansaireachta) is an apartment building located between Chancery Place and Charles Street West in Dublin city centre, Ireland. The complex (including its adjoining park) was built by Dublin Corporation as part of a corporation housing scheme in 1934-5. Built in the art deco style, both the house and park have been noted as adding "an element of variety to the architectural tone of the area". The complex is bounded by Chancery Street to the north, along which the Luas Red Line tram runs.

== History ==
Originally known as "Pill Lane" until 1896, the street was renamed as Chancery Street to reflect the importance of the Court of Chancery which was based in the adjacent Four Courts complex. The Court of Chancery was eventually abolished under the Supreme Court of Judicature Act (Ireland) in 1877 but the street name remained.

The Chancery Place complex was designed by Herbert George Simms, Housing Architect for Dublin Corporation, and completed in June 1935 against the backdrop of an acute shortage of adequate housing in the city of Dublin. The complex was constructed by Irish property development and construction company G&T Crampton in just eight months and were celebrated for the speed at which they were constructed, and the rental price at which they were let (1s 9d per room), which was within the means of lower paid city-centre workers.

Simms, an architect from a working-class background in London, was appointed to Dublin Corporation's architect's office on a temporary basis in January 1925 and over the course of the 1920s became familiar with the city's housing programme, then largely consisting of suburban schemes such as Drumcondra, and Cabra's Fassaugh Lane. As early as 1926, he was sent to visit London, Liverpool and Manchester to investigate the latest innovations in 'flat' building techniques in those cities. In 1932, he was made permanent in his job and appointed to the position of Housing Architect for the Corporation, a role which he would fulfil until his death in 1948. During his sixteen-year tenure, Simms was responsible for the design and erection of some 17,000 new homes in Dublin, including blocks of flats in the city centre which were influenced by the new apartment block designed by Michel de Klerk in Amsterdam, and Jacobus Oud in Rotterdam. The Greek Street housing scheme, completed in 1936 and nearby to Chancery House, was also the work of Simms.

On 14 April 2010, a commemorative plaque honouring Simms was unveiled at the entrance to Chancery Park by Lord Mayor of Dublin Emer Costello in recognition of his work.

From 1972 to 2018, a 5-storey office block named River House existed on the opposite side of Chancery Street to the complex. Described as a "brutalist eyesore" by the Sunday Times, it was demolished in 2018 to make way for a hotel.

== Design ==
Chancery House is a four-storey apartment block consisting of 27 apartments, which features curved corners, curved overhanging eaves, flat roofs and a channelled render along the top floor. The flat complex was heavily influenced by contemporaneous architectural practices in Amsterdam, and has been noted as being of an "exemplary modern design for its time". Christine Casey, a leading authority on Dublin's architectural heritage, has written on the distinctive nature of much of Simms' output, noting how he "developed formulae for inner-city blocks of flats, which derived ultimately from Dutch housing design, but probably more directly from contemporary British models. They are generally composed of three or four storey perimeter walk-up blocks with galleried rear elevations and stair-towers facing large inner-courtyards." Chancery House is typical of this formula. The complex (including its park) were refurbished in 2010 at a cost of €150,000.

== Chancery Park ==
Chancery Park
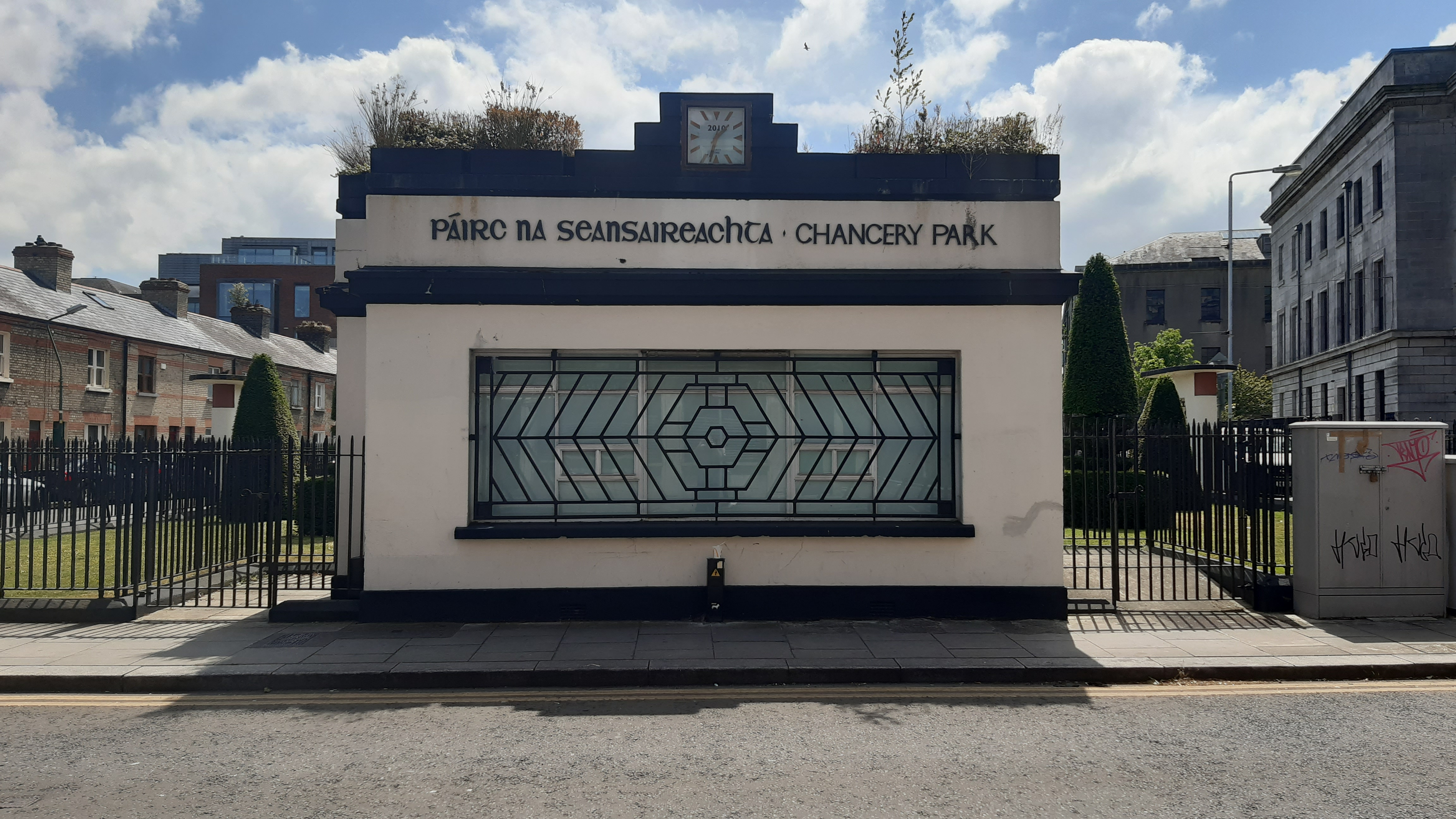
- The art-deco weighbridge "kiosk" at the park
- Interactive map of Chancery Park
- Type: Urban park
- Location: Chancery Street, Dublin
- Coordinates: 53°20′48″N 6°16′20″W
- Area: 0.2 acres (0.08 ha)
- Created: 1935
- Open: All year

While the provision of recreational space was not common in the earlier years of public housing, the Chancery scheme also included a small 0.2-acre park named Chancery Park (Irish: Páirc na Seansaireachta) on its northern side, intended for the use of residents. While Chancery House was being refurbished in 2010, a full upgrade of the park was undertaken by Dublin Corporation's 'Parks & Landscape Services'. As part of these works, the original central cast iron fountain was restored to working order together with a new landscape design consisting of formal yew topiary plants. A small art-deco weighbridge "kiosk" building which abuts Chancery Street was also refurbished that year, including the provision of a new (square) clock by Stokes of Cork. The kiosk includes a geometric stylised window grate and stepped parapet upon which the clock rests and several trees grow. The name of the park is written in a stylised Irish font as well as English on the side facing Chancery Street.

=== Opening hours ===
The opening hours of Chancery Park were criticised in the 4 May 2011 edition of Northside People West questioning why, after a €150,000 upgrade, the park was open to the public for only 15 hours a week "due to concerns over anti-social behaviour". As of 2014, the park was open from 8am to 4pm Monday to Thursday, with a half-day Friday.

== Gallery ==
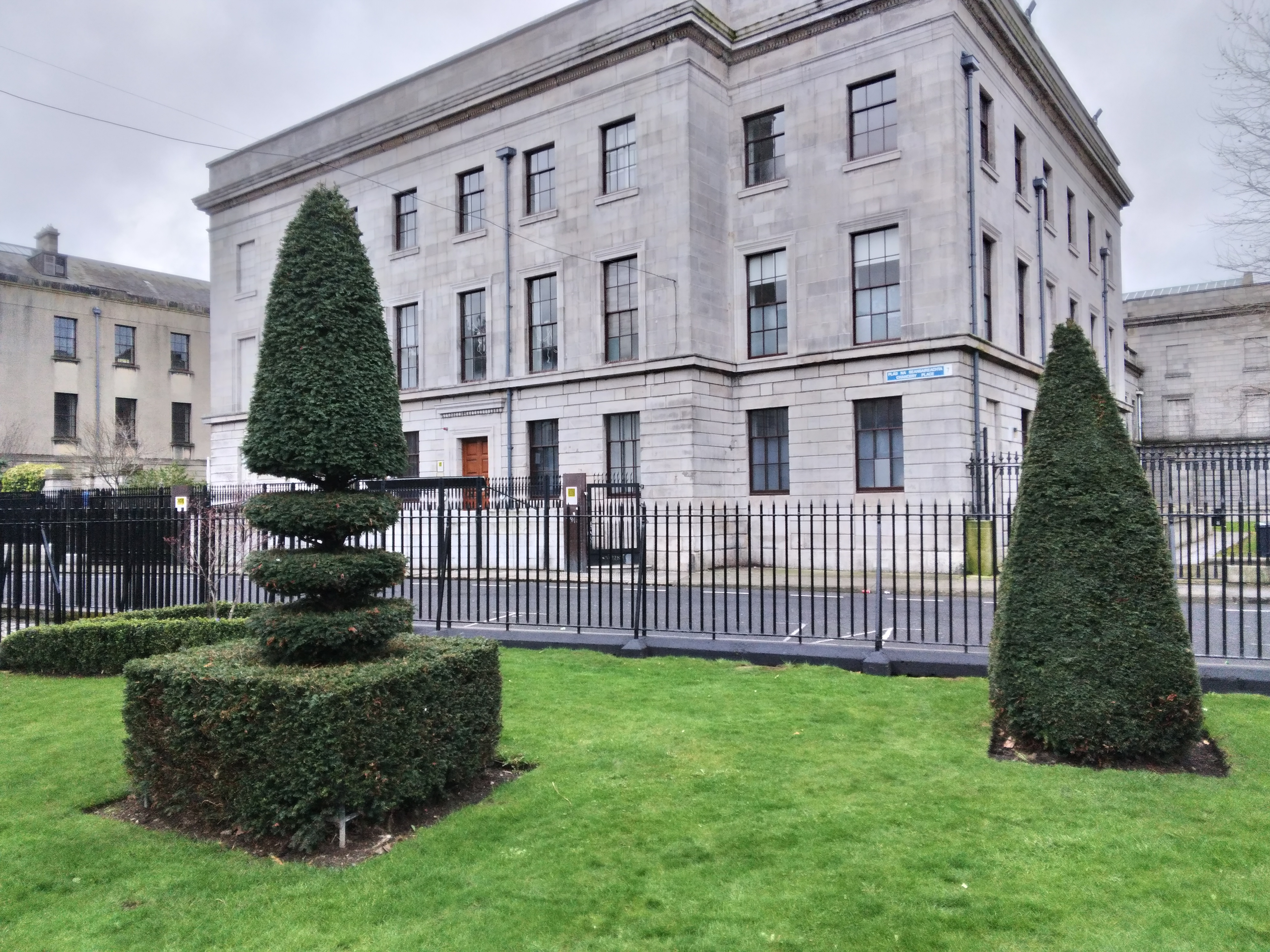
Yew topiary in the park

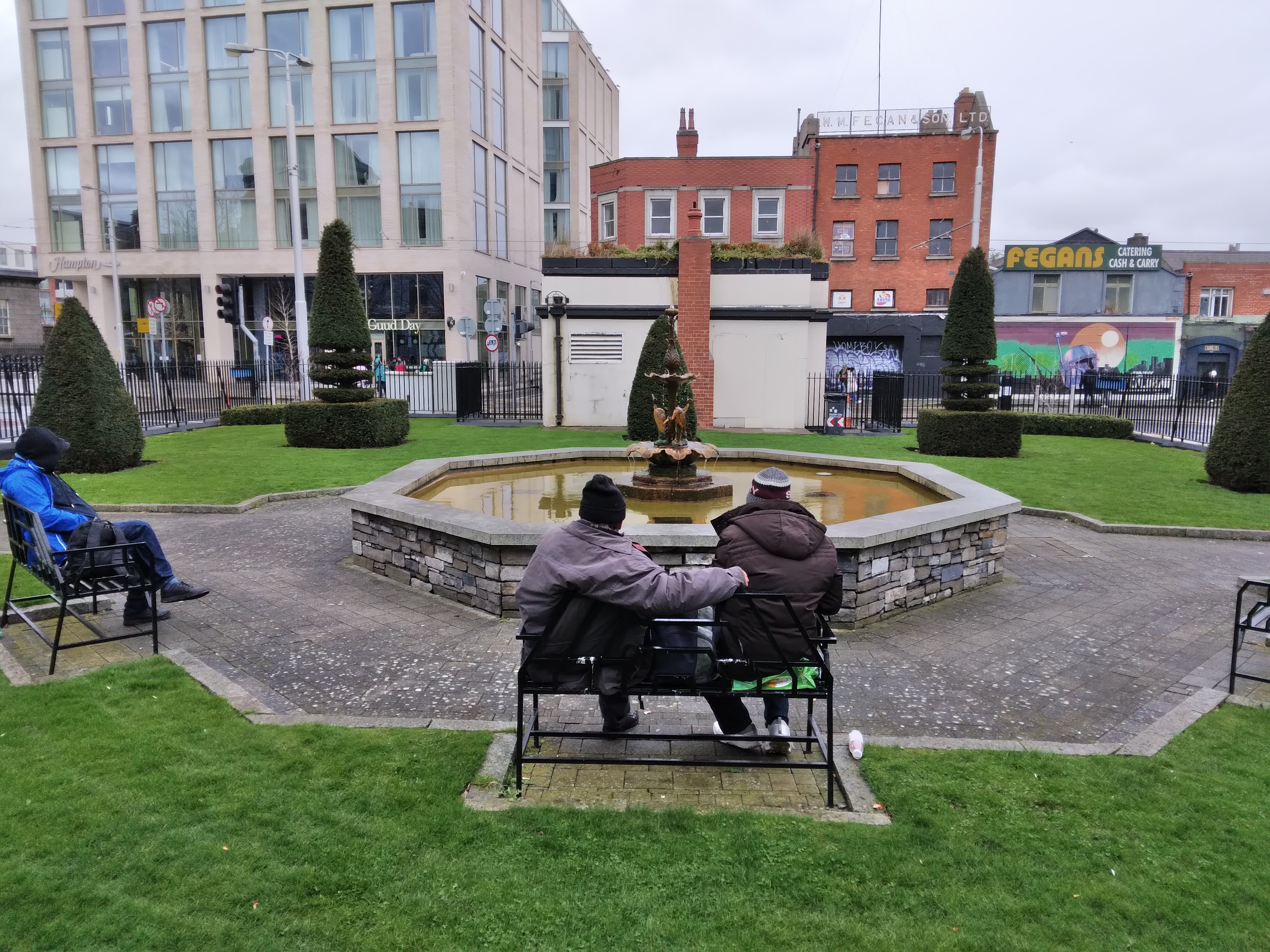
Looking north towards Chancery Street

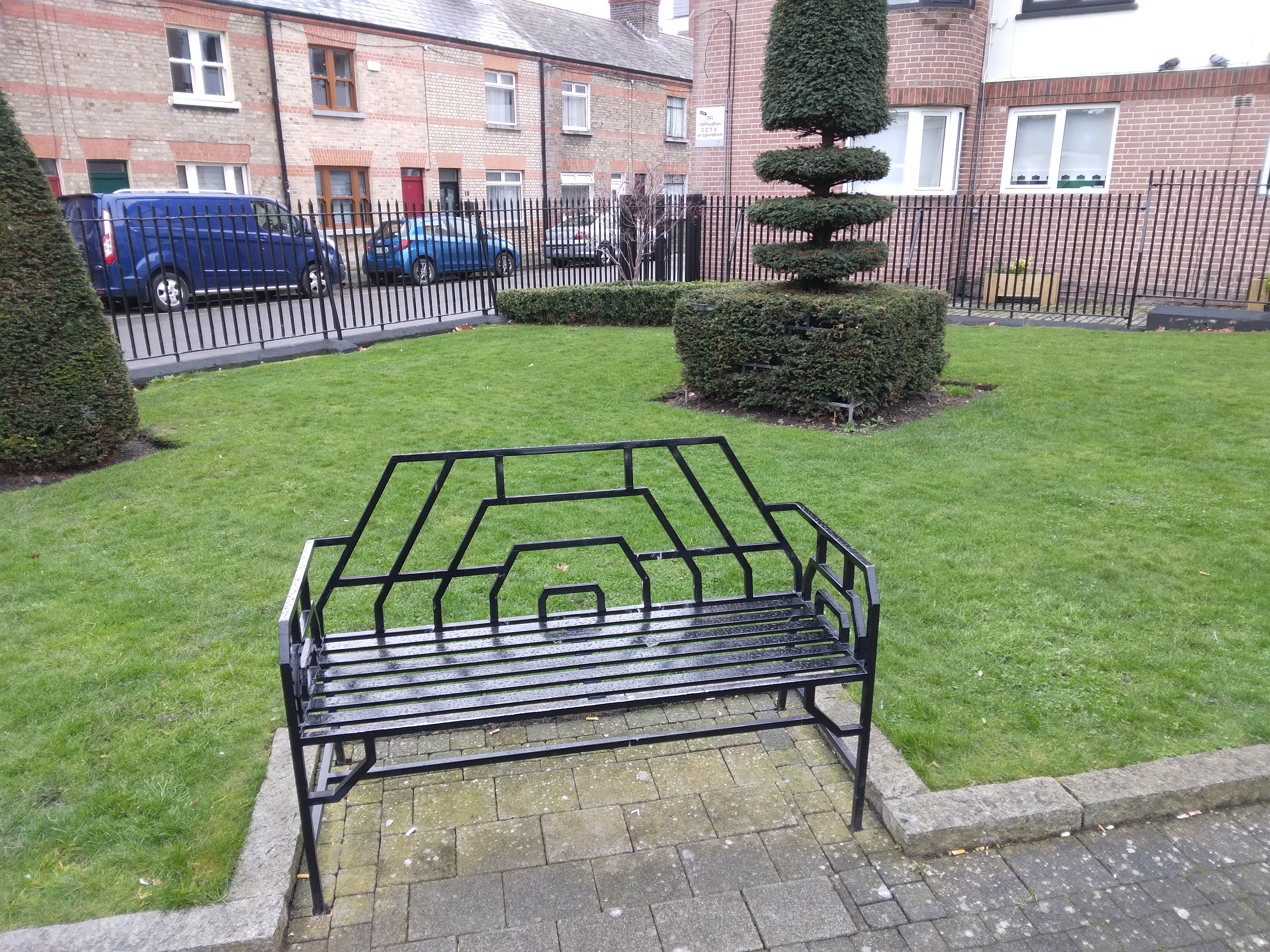
A bench in the park

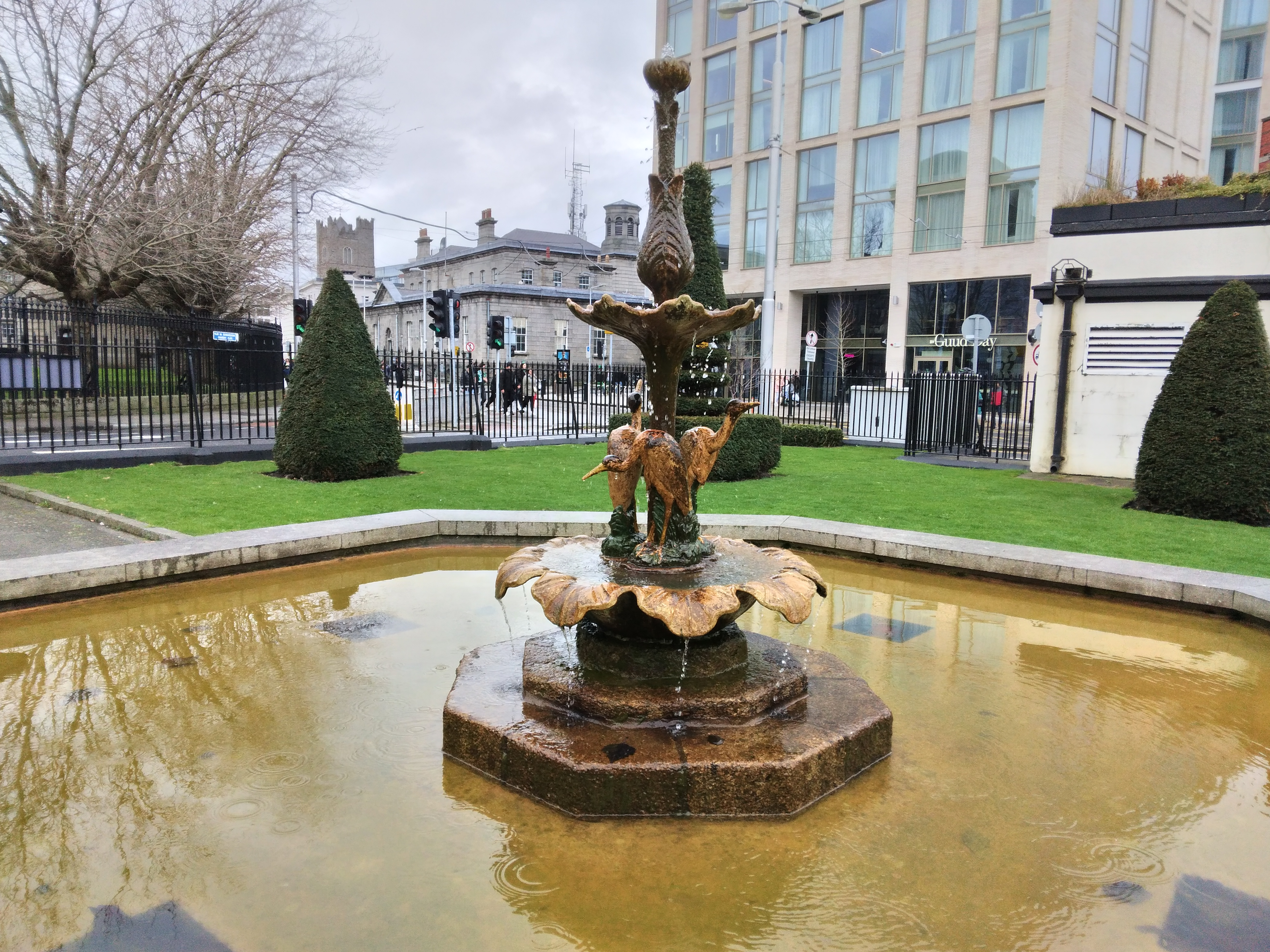
The fountain. Bridewell Courthouse is visible in the background.

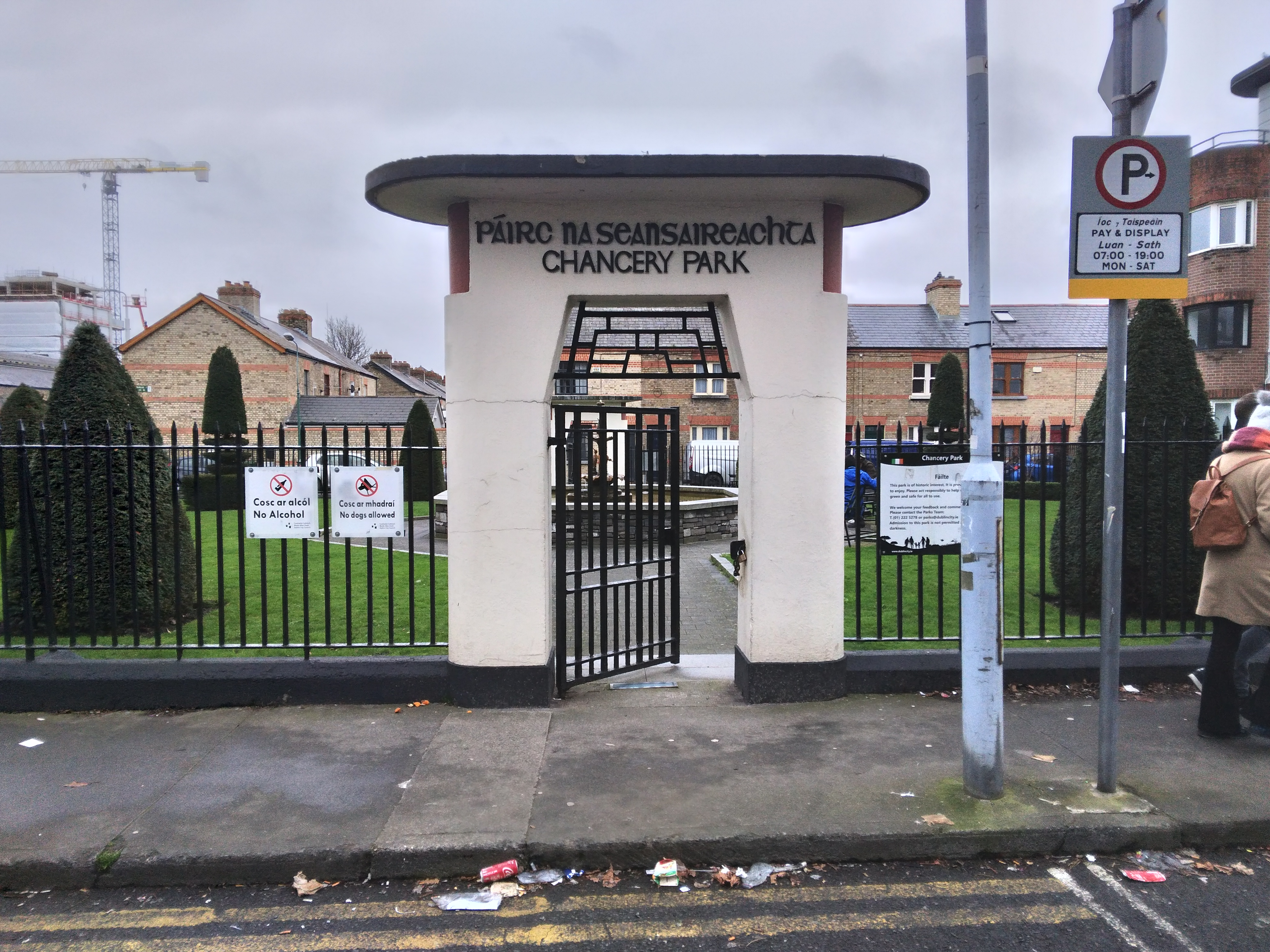
One of the stylised entrance gates into the park. Looking east.
