= Bridgefoot Street =

Street in Dublin, Ireland

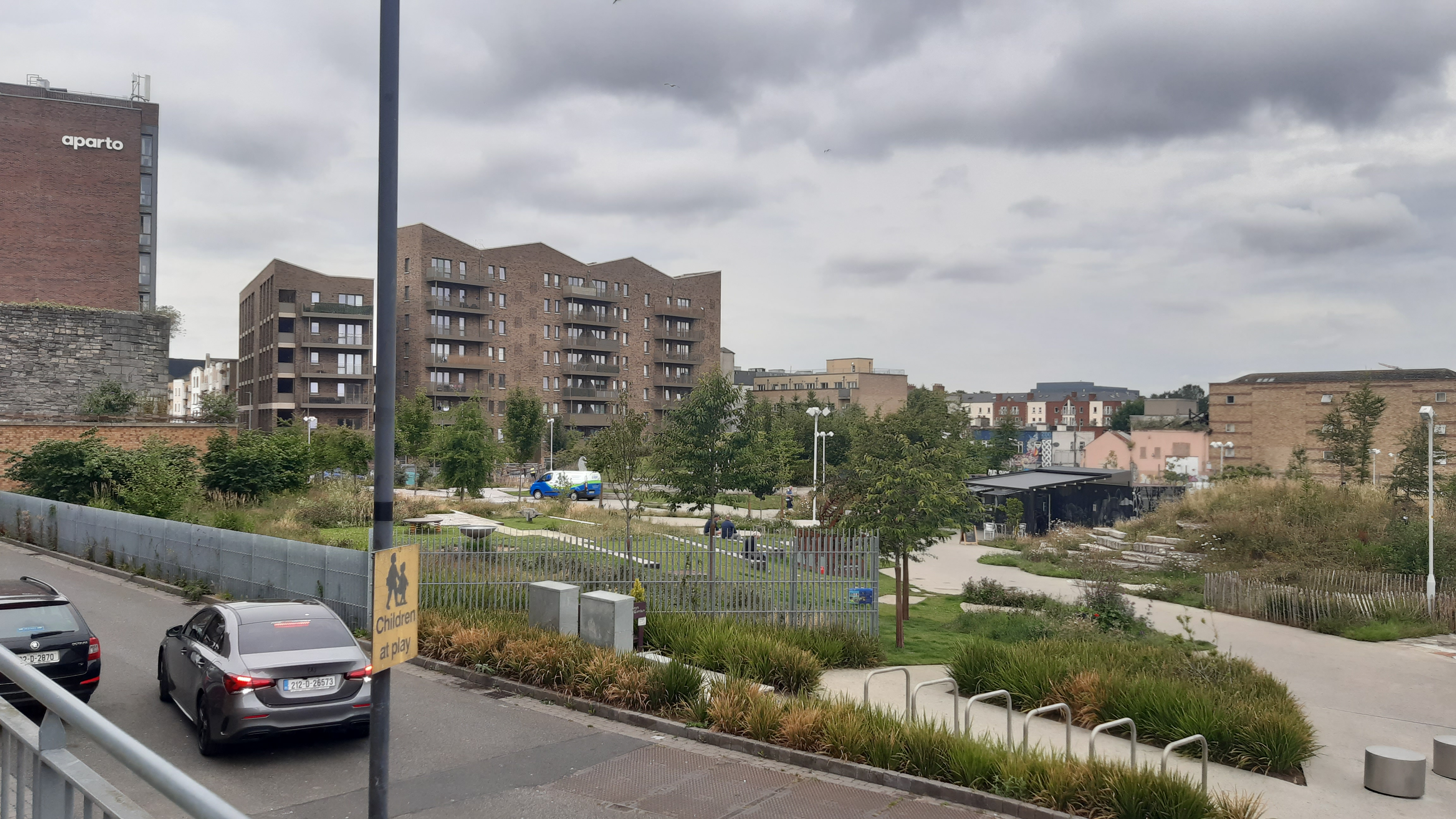
- Bridgefoot Street Park in July 2024
- Interactive map of Bridgefoot Street
- Native name: Sráid Bhun Droichid (Irish)
- Former name: Dirty Lane
- Location: Dublin, Ireland
- Postal code: D08
- Coordinates: 53°20′43″N 6°16′51″W
- north end: Mellows Bridge
- Major junctions: Island Street; Oliver Bond Street
- south end: Thomas Street

Bridgefoot Street (Irish: Sráid Bhun Droichid) is a street in Dublin, Ireland which connects Mellows Bridge and Usher's Island with Thomas Street and forms part of the Liberties.

Known for a period as Dirty Lane, the street is bookended by a vista of St Catherine's Church on Thomas Street to its south.

== History ==
The name Bridgefoot Street is derived from "Bridge-foot" relating to the foot of a bridge. The area around the street has been inhabited since at least medieval times. Remains of the medieval school of Thomas Aquinas were discovered on the street during excavations in 1998.

Bridgefoot House was also the name of the residence of Sir William Ussher (1561 - 1637) in the area. It was here that the first book printed in the Irish language, containing an alphabet and a Christian catechism, was created, although there had been many previously created through non-printed methods.

The street is not specifically detailed on John Speed's Map of Dublin (1610), although nearby landmarks such as St Catherine's church can clearly be seen, as well as nearby streams and small rivers.

From around the 1600s, the upper part of the street was known as Dirty Lane, a name that by 1838 was applied to the whole street. A Roman Catholic chapel was located on this part of the street in the first half of the 17th century.

The area was generally an industrial and impoverished area outside of the city walls, which contained waste and disposal facilities and tanneries. Adjacent Island Street was even at one stage called Dunghill Street, while the nearby area of Mullinahack was a phonetic English name for 'Muileann an Caca' meaning, dirty or filthy mill.

Around 1775, a new Four Courts Marshalsea complex was constructed off the street and was in use as a debtors' prison, a barracks and later as housing until it was mostly demolished around 1975. Today, the site of the prison and barracks forms part of Bridgefoot Street park, and some of the original limestone walls are still fully intact and now form a boundary between student accommodation and the park.

=== 19th century ===
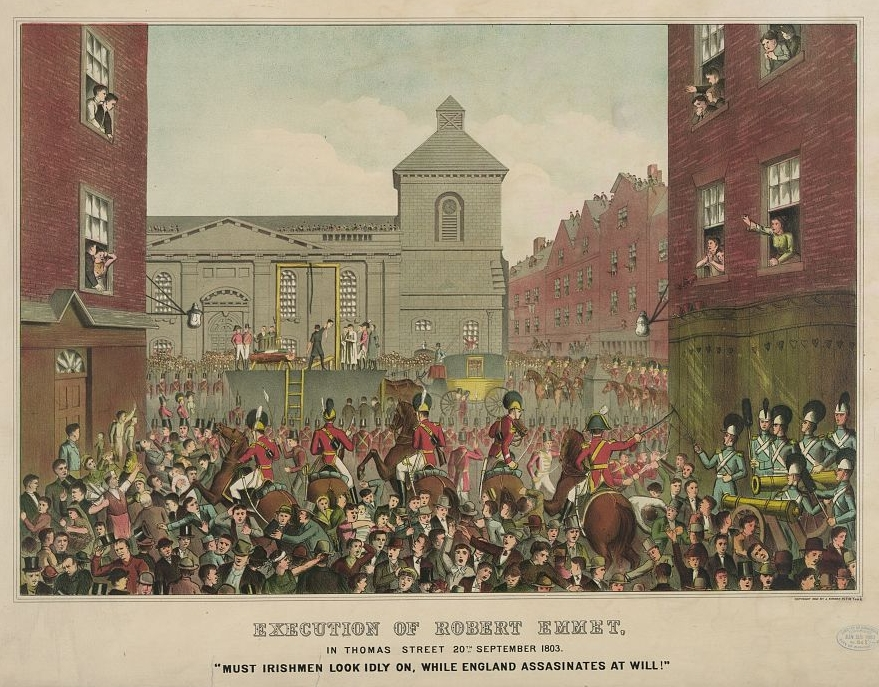
Robert Emmet execution of 1803, as viewed from Bridgefoot Street.

In 1803, Robert Emmet was hanged on a gallows in front of St Catherine's church, with onlookers gathering on Thomas Street and Bridgefoot Street.

Since 1818, the Mendicity Institution has been located in Moira House off the street with entrances via Usher's Quay and Island Street. Part of the original grounds now contain apartments which are entered via Bridgefoot Street.

For a period in the second half of the 19th century, Albert L. Altman had a salt business at 1-6 Bridgefoot Street while living at nearby 11 Usher's Island. The business is mentioned in various works of James Joyce as "Altman the saltman".

=== 20th century ===
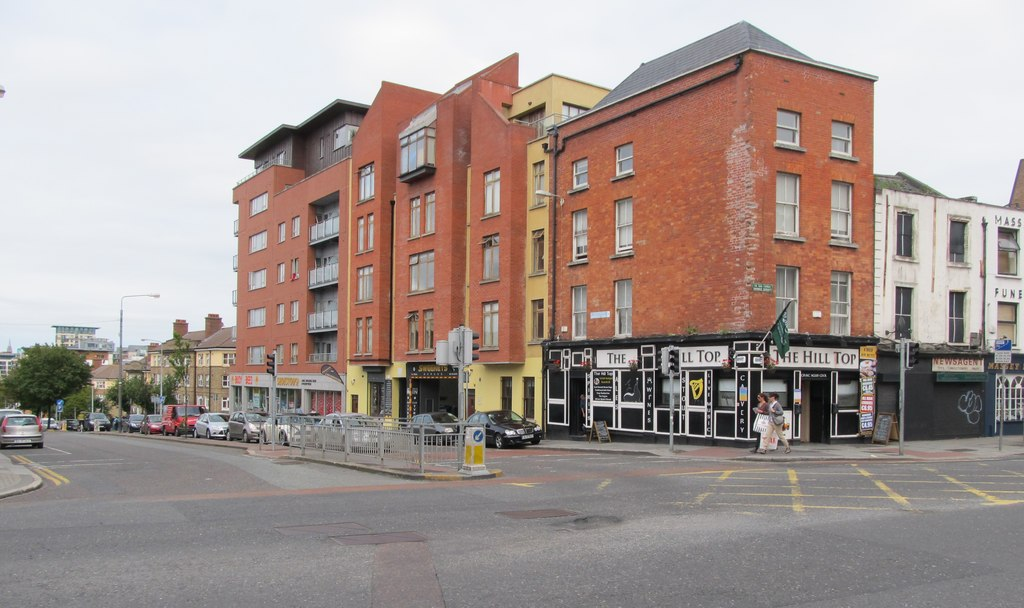
Bridgefoot Street from Thomas Street West.

In the 1930s, a number of apartment blocks were built on the street and nearby streets, these are commonly referred to as Oliver Bond flats and were designed by Herbert George Simms.

The street was significantly widened in the 1960s and 1970s, as it was part of a planned motorway that was to run through Dublin city. The route was to be known as "the inner tangent" and had 4 lanes of traffic.

The development known as Corporation Flats was built on the street in 1964, designed by architecture firm Michael Scott & Associates. It was later demolished in 2005–2006 after becoming increasingly derelict.

=== 21st century ===
Bridgefoot Street Park was redeveloped in 2022 and reopened with a community garden.
