= G&T Crampton =

Defunct Irish construction company

- Industry: Construction, general contracting and property development
- Founded: 1879
- Headquarters: Clonskeagh, Dublin, Ireland
- Key people: George J. Crampton (founder); Thomas Crampton (co-founder); George Crampton (director); Philip Crampton (director)

G&T Crampton (founded 1879) is an Irish property development and construction company. It entered liquidation in 2021.

== History ==
G&T Crampton was founded in 1879 by George J. Crampton. George Crampton formed a partnership with his nephew Tom Crampton in 1905, resulting in the current name. It became a limited company in 1925 and remains under family ownership. During the Celtic Tiger it had revenues of €241 million. The head office is based in Clonskeagh.

Since 1979, G&T Crampton has sponsored an annual award of €10,000 for students of civil engineering and structural engineering at Trinity College Dublin, University College Dublin, and Technological University Dublin. The company also sponsors an annual Silver Trowel award for the best bricklayer apprentice in Ireland. In 2017, G&T Crampton donated a collection of photographs of its construction works to University College Dublin. The 667 images date from 1892 to 1988.

In May 2007, it was fined €50,000 for negligence due to the death of construction worker. G&T Crampton is now an unlimited company under the control of an Isle of Man company. In March 2021, the company was declared insolvent and Declan McDonald of PwC was appointed as liquidator.

== Works ==
The company built many notable commercial and public buildings around Dublin, as well as many private residential developments around Herbert Park, near Donnybrook and Ballsbridge. "Crampton-built" is often used to describe the perceived high quality of their construction. Several of the Dublin Corporation projects designed by Herbert Simms were built by G&T Crampton, including houses in Cabra (1930–1931) and Crumlin (1934–1944), the Chancery Place flats (1935), and Pearse House (1936). In 1967, it completed the Berkeley Library at Trinity College Dublin designed by Paul Koralek. It has also worked internationally.

== Notable buildings ==
- Bank of Ireland, O'Connell Street branch
- Trinity College Dublin, Berkeley Library
- Embassy of the United States, Dublin
- Fitzwilton House
- InterContinental Dublin
- Georges Quay Plaza
- Lansdowne House, Dublin
- Mater Private Hospital
- National Concert Hall
- St. Columba's Hospital
- Stephen's Green Shopping Centre
- Wynn's Hotel, Dublin
- Offices of the newly formed Guardian Royal Exchange Assurance Company at St Stephen's Green
- Williams and Woods factory and offices, King's Inns Street, Dublin

== See also ==
- McInerney Holdings PLC
