= Wynn's Hotel =

Wynn's Hotel may refer to:

- Any Wynn Resorts hotel
  - Wynn Las Vegas in particular
- Wynn's Hotel, Dublin, historic hotel on O'Connell Street, Dublin, Ireland
