= Plan (magazine) =

Plan Magazine
- July/August 2018 issue
- Editor: Michael Hayes
- Categories: Architecture, art and design
- Frequency: Bi – Monthly
- Publisher: MCD Media Ltd.
- First issue: October 1969
- Company: Plan Magazines Ltd
- Country: Ireland
- Based in: Dublin
- Language: English
- Website: Official website

Plan is a bi-monthly architecture and design publication based in Dublin, Ireland. It caters mainly for Irish and international architects and designers. Plan also documents alternative architectural culture such as interdisciplinary interplays between architecture and philosophy, art and new social movements. The magazine has featured contributions from, and interviews with, Daniel Libeskind, Peter Eisenman, Massimiliano Fuksas, Tadao Ando, Paul Andreu, Will Alsop, Wolf D Prix and Frank McDonald among others. The first Editor-In-Chief, and principal architect of the magazine, was Uinseann MacEoin. Acting as both editor and publisher, his magazine won much praise in 1970s Ireland. Plan has won several awards since this time, and received a major redesign in 2007.

== Publisher and editors ==
Publisher: MCD Media Ltd.

Managing Editor: Michael McDonnell

Editor: Michael Hayes

Former editors: Denise Maguire, Richard Conway.
