= Thorncastle Street flats =

Building in Dublin, Ireland

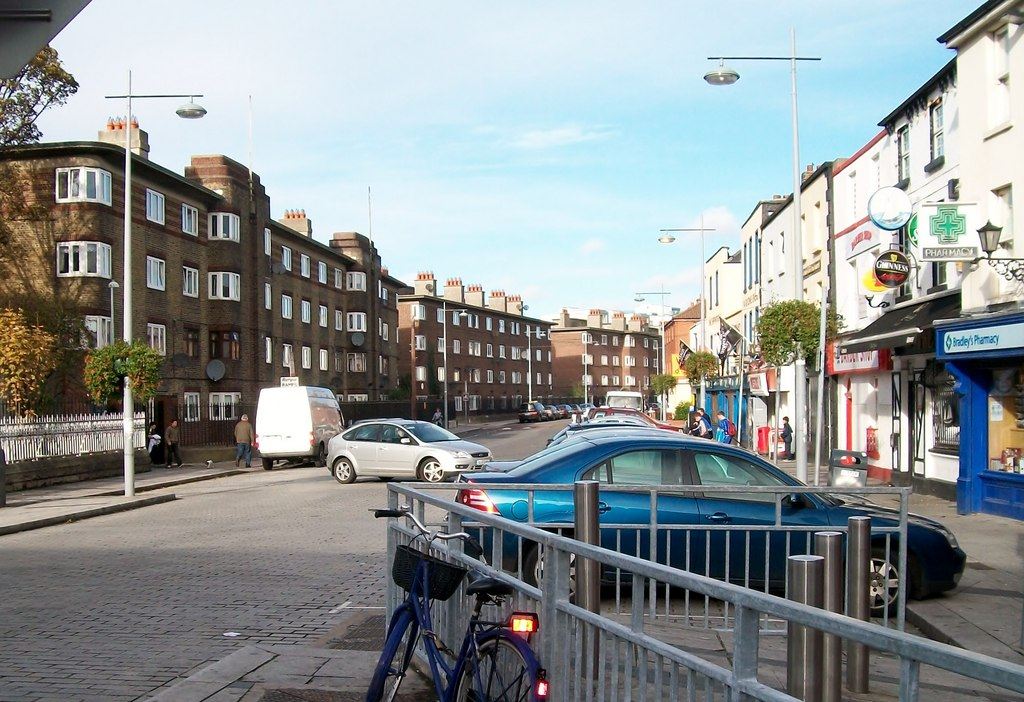
- Thorncastle Street flats are on the left
- Interactive map of the Thorncastle Street flats area
- Alternative names: O'Rahilly House flats

General information
- Coordinates: 53.343057°N 6.228258°W
- Year built: 1936

Design and construction
- Architect: Herbert George Simms

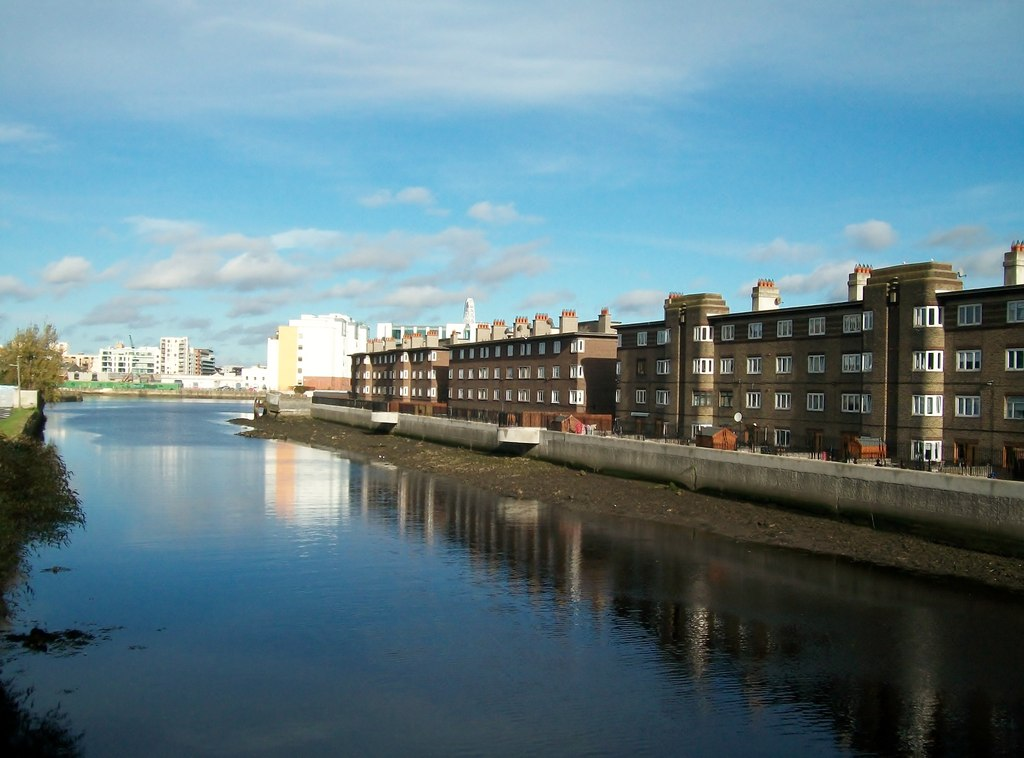
The flats and River Dodder from Ringsend Bridge

Thorncastle Street flats is a complex of social housing apartments, designed by Herbert George Simms. Situated in Ringsend, it was constructed in the 1930s in a modernist style. There are three blocks of flats with the southernmost block having the most ornamentation. It is located on the banks of the River Dodder close to where it joins the Grand Canal Docks and Liffey Estuary.

The complex was officially named after The O'Rahilly. The name Thorncastle comes from the estate of Thorncastle which was held by the Fitzwilliam family since at least the 1500s.
