= Nassau Street, Dublin =

Street in central Dublin, Ireland

Nassau Street
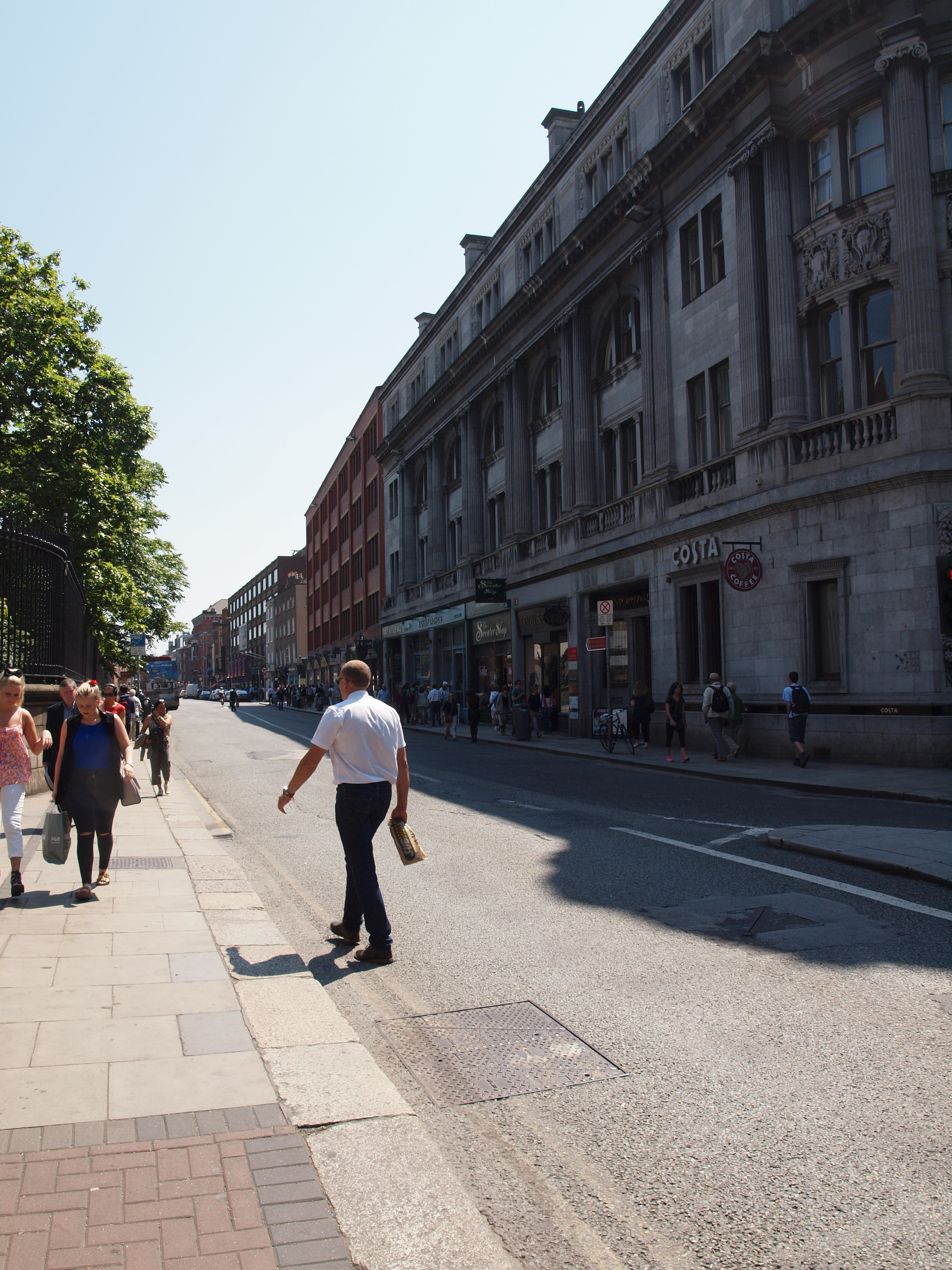

- Location within Central Dublin
- Native name: Sráid Nassau (Irish); Sráid Thobar Phádraig (Irish)
- Former name: St Patrick's Well Lane
- Namesake: House of Orange-Nassau
- Length: 300 m (980 ft)
- Width: 19 metres (62 ft)
- Location: Dublin, Ireland
- Postal code: D02
- Coordinates: 53.342718°N 6.256892°W
- west end: Suffolk Street, Grafton Street
- east end: Kildare Street, Leinster Street South

Construction
- Inauguration: 1756

Other
- Known for: shops, cafés

Nassau Street (/ˈnæsɔː/; Irish: Sráid Nassau) is a street in central Dublin, running along the south side of Trinity College. It goes from Grafton Street in the west to the junction of South Leinster Street and Kildare Street in the east.

== History and naming ==
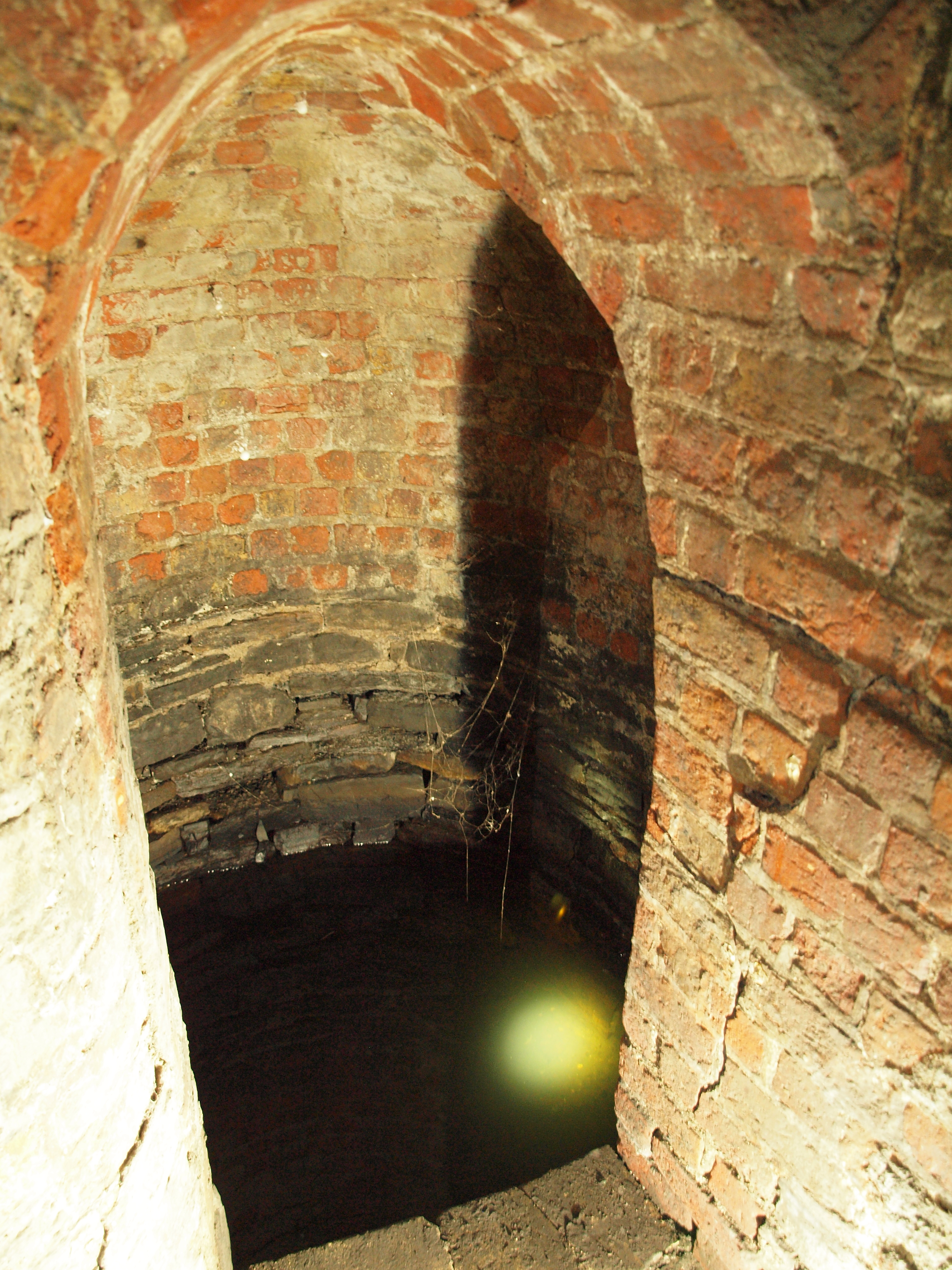
St Patrick's Well, Trinity College

Formerly known as St Patrick's Well Lane after a 12th-century well, it was renamed in the 18th century, after the accession to the throne of King William III, a member of the House of Orange-Nassau. To emphasise the point, one of the houses erected a marble bust of William with the couplet:

May we never want a Williamite
to kick the breech of a Jacobite!

The site of the well is in the grounds of Trinity College, near the Nassau Street exit. Folklore connects the well with Saint Patrick, who (legend states) struck the ground with his staff and brought forth water bubbling to the surface. The well can still be visited by arrangement with the Provost's Office of Trinity College.

Two separate visits to the street by United States President Bill Clinton have made headlines. In December 2000, the outgoing US First Family visited the Blarney Woollen Mills store. In March 2017, ex-President Clinton made an unannounced stop at the Kilkenny Store.

== Redevelopment ==
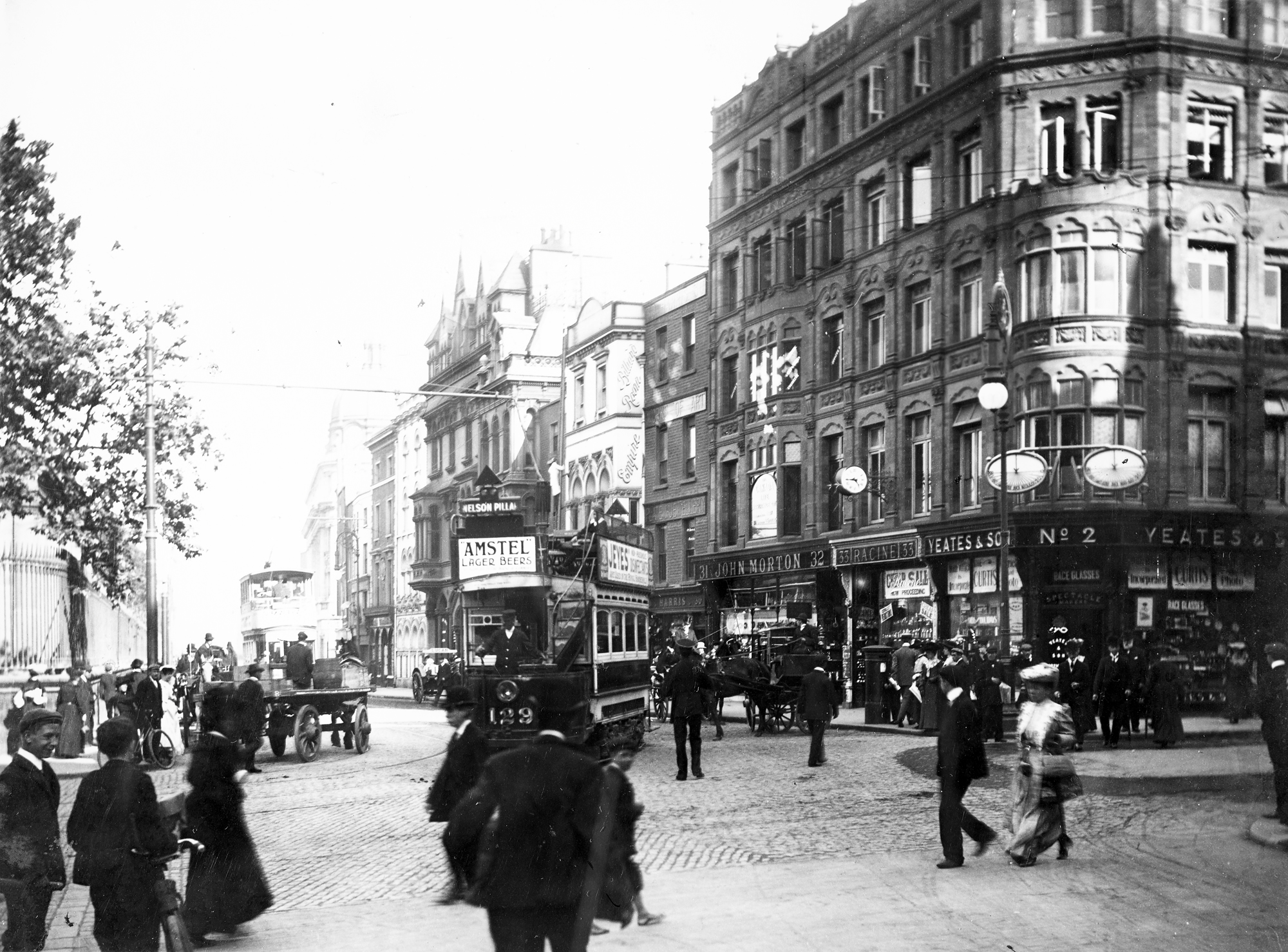
Trams and pedestrians on Nassau Street, viewed from Grafton Street c. 1900

From the 1960s onwards many of the Georgian and Victorian buildings on the street were demolished in favour of modern retail and office units. One such development was on the corner of Nassau Street and Dawson Street by the Norwich Union Group. A collection of 15 Georgian and Victorian buildings were demolished, including the original Elverys Sports corner store and the 1870 McCurdy's Law Club. The new 5-storey t-shaped office block with street-level retail units was designed by Lardner and Partners. The new building, completed in 1967 was called Nassau House. Permission was granted to demolish this block in 2016, and the construction of a replacement mixed-use development is due for completion in 2022. In the 1970s, a 2.5-acre site facing onto the street was redeveloped as the Setanta Centre.

== Popular culture ==
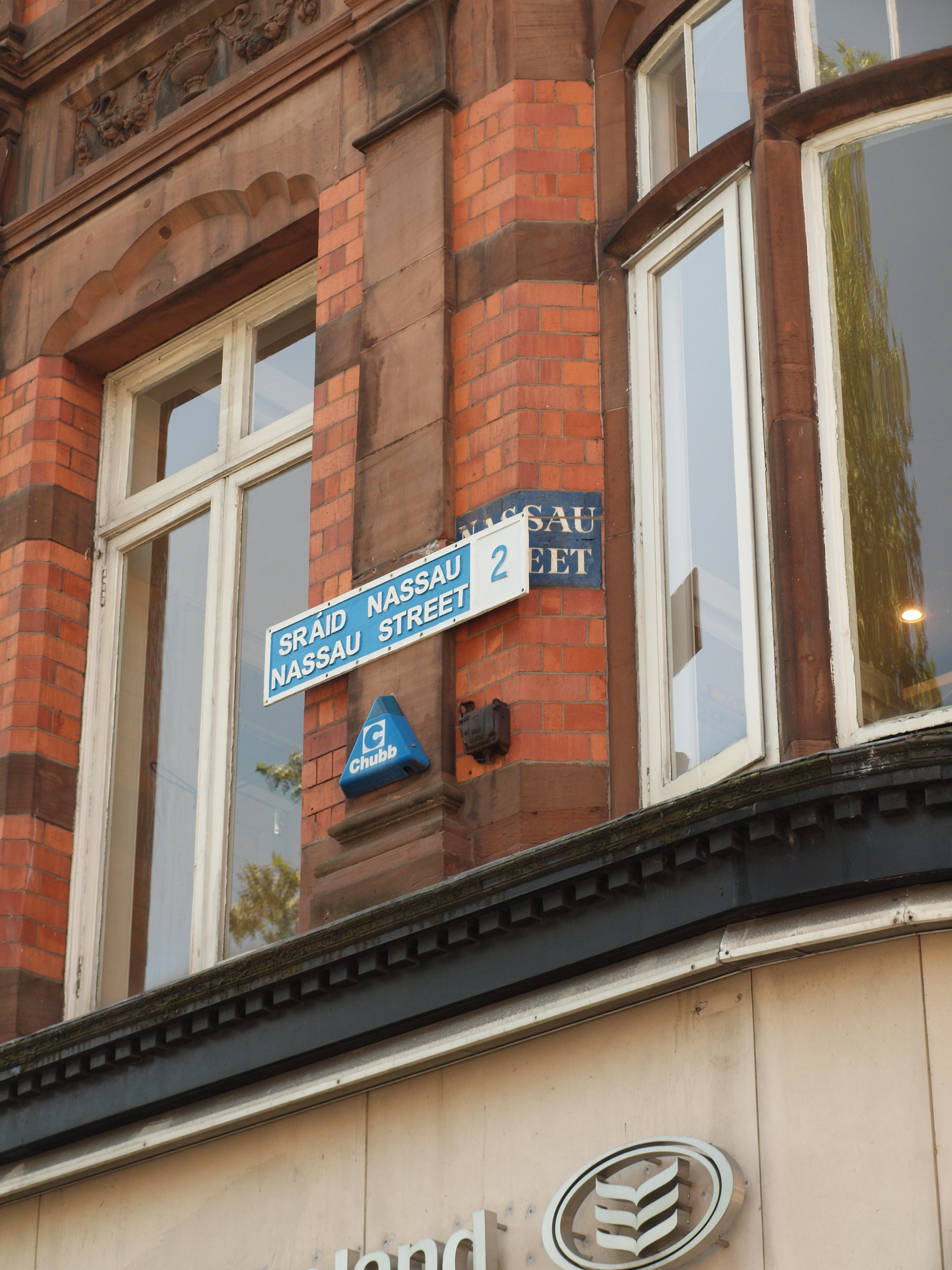
Nassau Street sign

Nassau Street is famous for being the location in which Irish writer James Joyce met his lifelong love, Nora Barnacle, on 10 June 1904.

== See also ==
- List of streets and squares in Dublin
