= Setanta Centre =

Office block in Dublin, Ireland

- Interactive map of the Setanta Centre area
- Etymology: Named after Setanta

General information
- Location: Dublin, Ireland
- Coordinates: 53.342214°N 6.2576929°W
- Completed: 1976

Technical details
- Floor count: 7
- Floor area: 123,000 sq ft (11,400 m^{2})

Design and construction
- Architect: Brian Hogan
- Developer: Hardwicke

The Setanta Centre is a 9-storey office block with ground floor retail space in Nassau Street, Dublin, Ireland.

== History ==
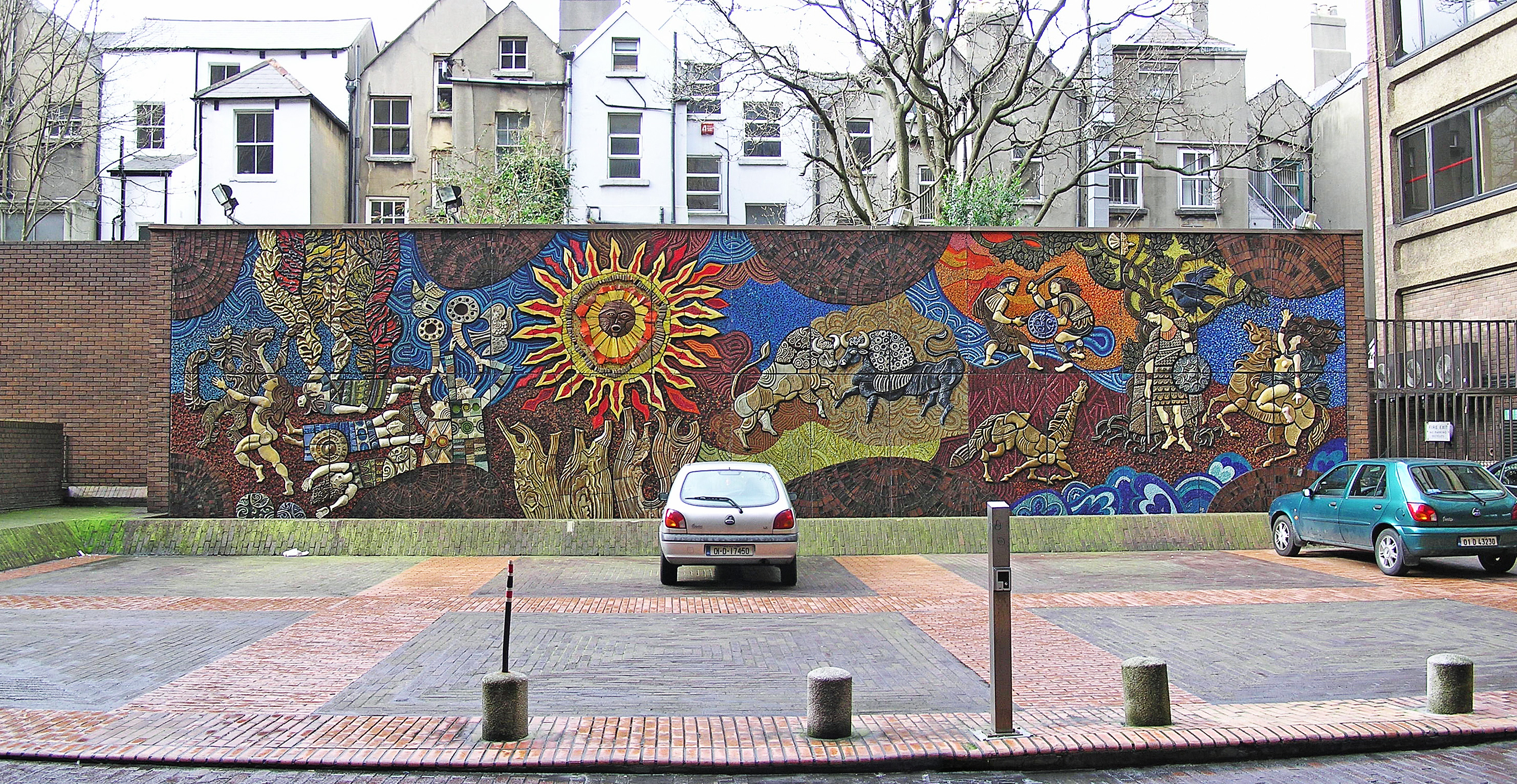
Kinney's mosaic

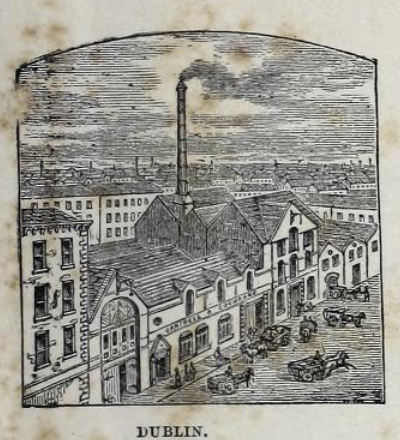
Cantrell and Cochrane, Nassau Place, Dublin 2 from a trade magazine of c1870. The site was later to become that of the Setanta Centre.

In March 1967, Setanta Investments applied for permission for an office development on the former site of C&C Group's factory spanning from Nassau Street to Molesworth Street and from Kildare Street to South Frederick Street. Setanta Investments was a joint venture between New Ireland Assurance and Hardwicke Ltd. The company directors included Senator Eoin Ryan and developer Mont Kavanagh. Over the course of a few years, a 2.5-acre site was assembled, containing over 55 properties. Uinseann MacEoin, commented on the use of the name Setanta stating "If ever a redevelopment group hiding under the patriotic name of the young Cuchulain represented a powerful phalanx of wrap-the-green-flag-round-me-boys, it is this one."

The initial planning permission was refused, with Setanta Investments successfully appealing to the minister, Kevin Boland, who granted permission in September 1968. Owing to objections from groups like the Irish Georgian Society, some of the development included replica Georgian facades including those on the corner of Kildare Street and Molesworth Street.

The Setanta Centre was built by Hardwicke Ltd and completed by 1976. It was designed by Brian Hogan and consists of 7 floors of office space with 4 retail units at ground level, and a large public car park. A large mosaic was commissioned for the centre from Desmond Kinney, depicting the events of the story of the Táin.

== Redevelopment ==
The centre was bought in 2003 by Larry Goodman for €85 million, and he subsequently attempted to sell it in 2016 for €100 million. In April 2018, Goodman announced plans for a €150 million redevelopment of the complex. The plans included a new 8-storey office block, with Dublin City Council voicing concerns about the proposed redevelopment, such as the extent of the demolition and the preservation and reinstatement of the Kinney mosaic. It has also led to legal cases being taken against Goodman as the Setanta Centre Unlimited Company by two tenants of the centre, Reads of Nassau Street and Kilkenny Shop over rights of access and the disruption the redevelopment will cause to the businesses. Any redevelopment of the site has been halted due to the COVID-19 pandemic.

== See also ==
- Lansdowne House, Dublin
