= Henrietta Place, Dublin =

Street in Dublin, Ireland

Henrietta Place
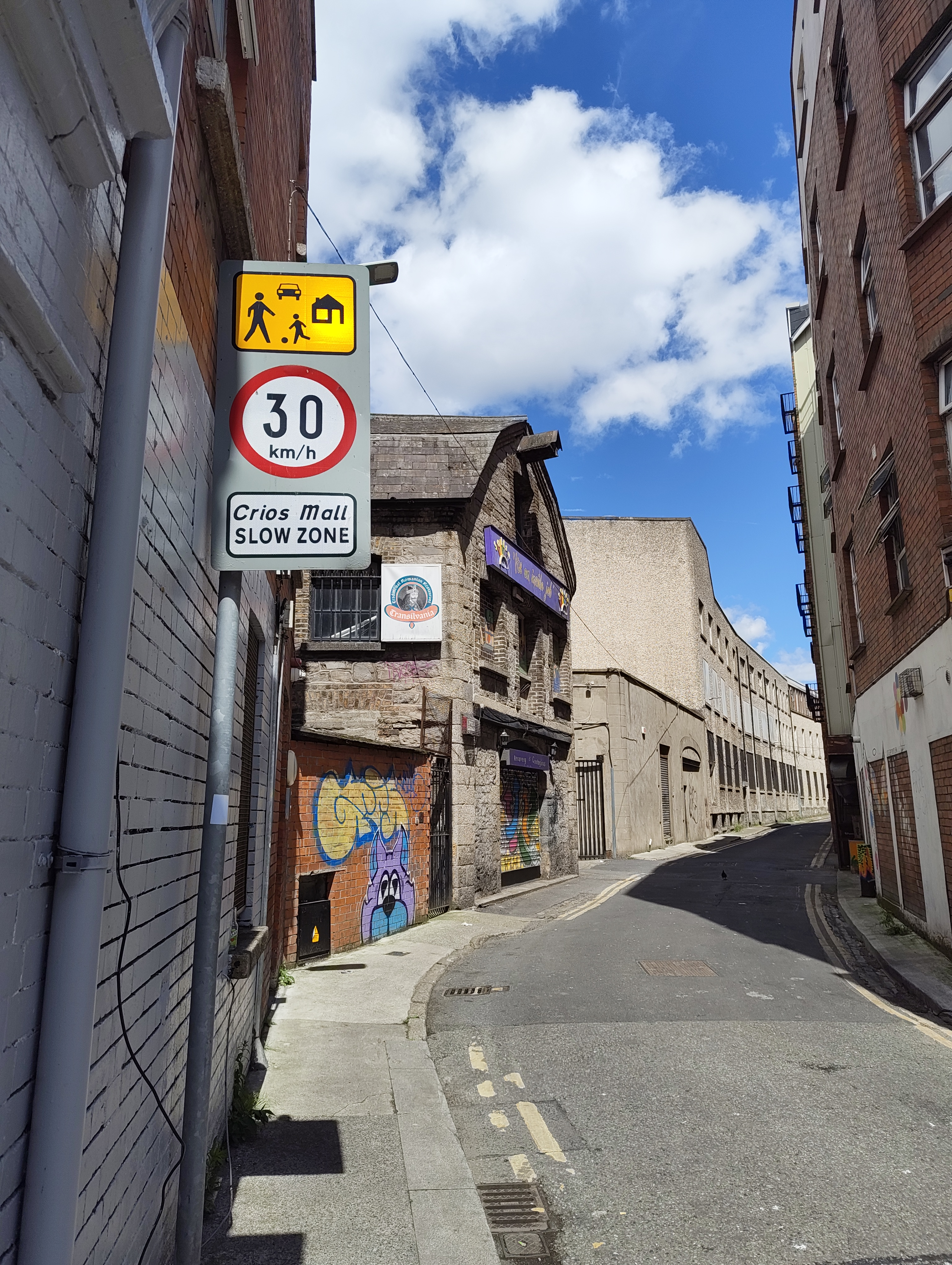
- Henrietta Place looking north from the junction with North King Street in 2026 including the former Transylvania Restaurant building
- Interactive map of Henrietta Place
- Native name: Plás Henrietta (Irish)
- Former name: Stable Lane
- Namesake: Henrietta, Duchess of Grafton (1690–1726); or Henrietta Paulet, Duchess of Bolton (1697–1730)
- Location: Dublin, Ireland
- Postal code: D01
- Coordinates: 53°21′05″N 6°16′13″W
- north end: Henrietta Street
- Major junctions: Yarnhall Street
- south end: North King Street

Henrietta Place (Irish: Plás Henrietta) is a street in Dublin which connects Henrietta Street to the north and North King Street to the south.

== History ==
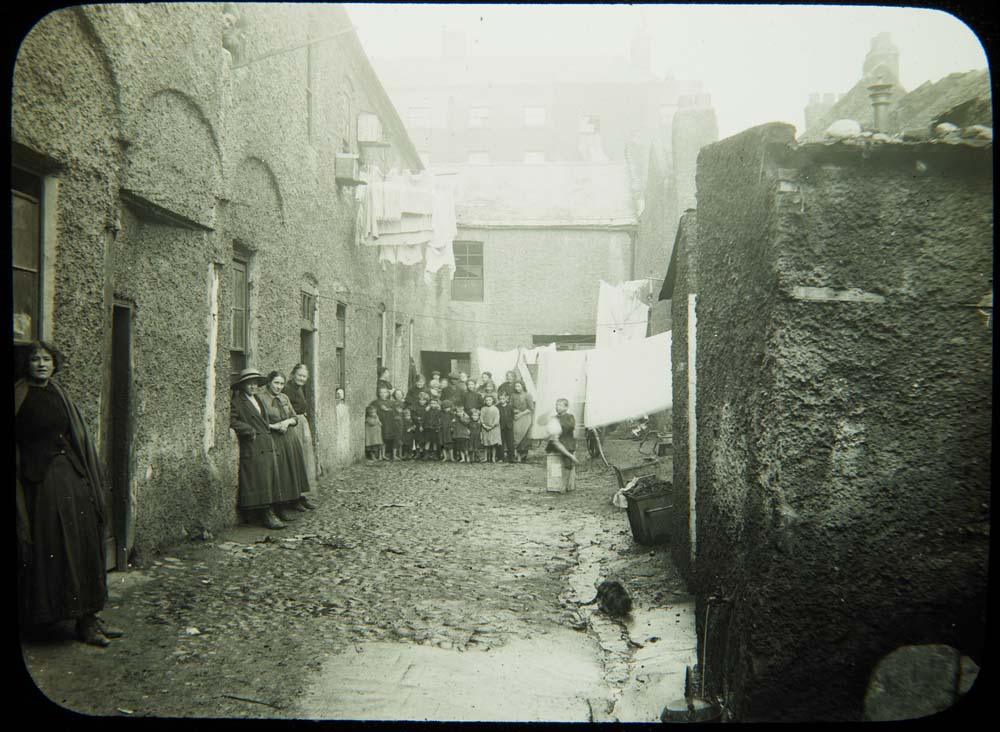
Henrietta Place in 1913

The street, along with Henrietta Street and Henrietta Lane, is generally held to be named after Henrietta (née Somerset; 1690–1726), the wife of Charles FitzRoy, 2nd Duke of Grafton, although an alternative candidate is Henrietta (née Crofts; 1697–1730), third wife of Charles Paulet, 2nd Duke of Bolton. The nearby Bolton Street is named after Paulet. On John Rocque's map, it is marked as Stable Lane, a common name for such back streets and lanes.

The arched gate entrance to the former Linenhall complex, now a campus of the Technological University of Dublin, faces on the street at its junction of Yarnhall Street. The archway itself, dating from around 1781, was designed by Thomas Cooley.

=== Henrietta House ===
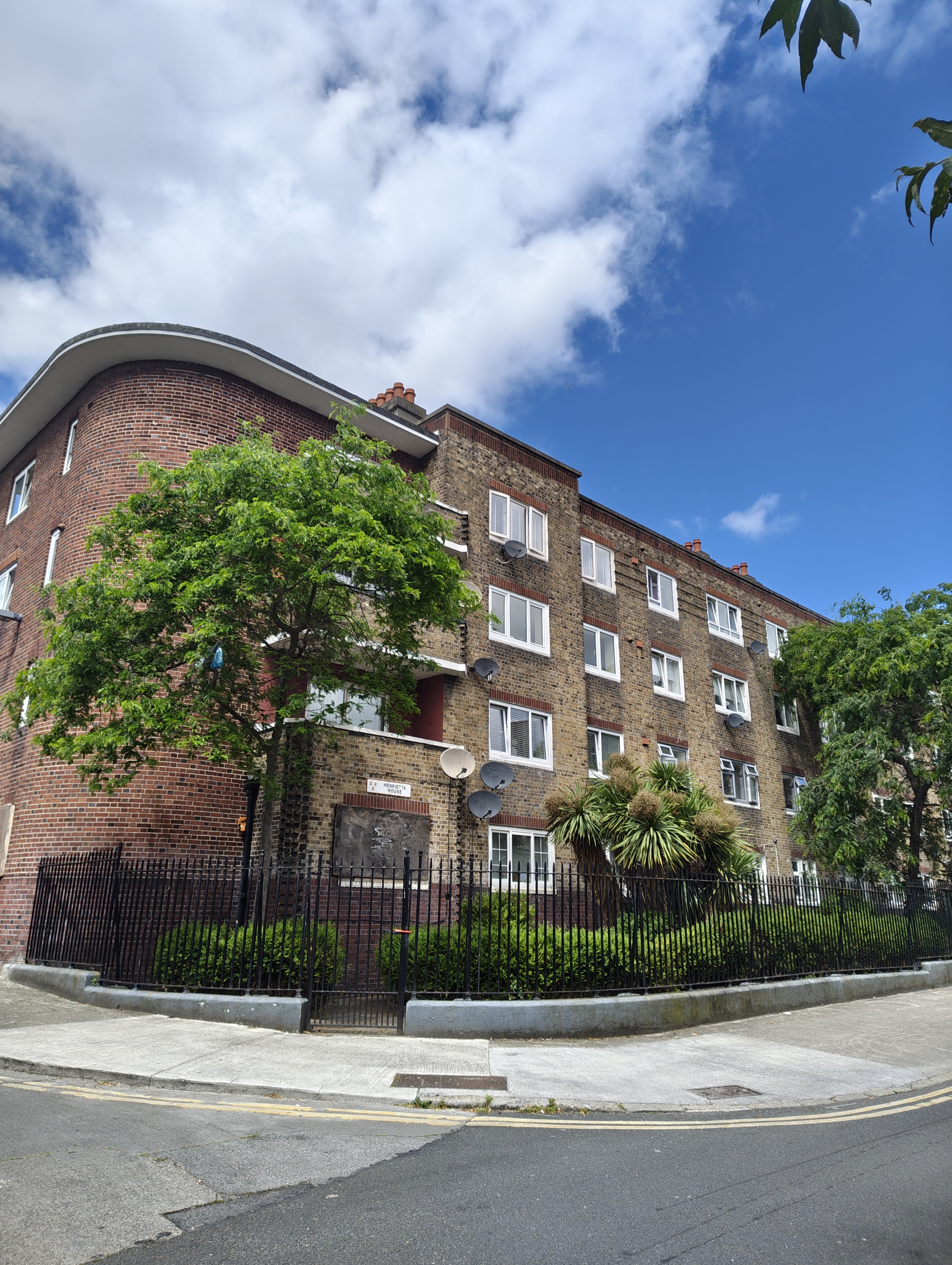
Henrietta House

One of the most notable buildings on the street is the public housing complex, Henrietta House. Built on the former gardens of a number of the houses on Henrietta Street, the complex was designed by Herbert Simms as the city Housing Architect for Dublin Corporation. It was built between 1936 and 1939, the four-storey detached blocks of flats face into a central courtyard. The overall design was heavily influenced by similar, contemporary buildings in Amsterdam. The scheme replaced the tenements and makeshift homes that previously occupied the site and the local area.

=== Transylvania Restaurant ===
Number 7a, former warehouse built circa 1810, previously housed the Transylvania Restaurant, Ireland's first Romanian Taverna. It was converted from a factory warehouse into a cafe in 1996, and was run as the Transylvania Restaurant by an asylum seeker to Ireland from Romania, Petre Tănase from 1998. Tănase chose the name and character of the restaurant to counter the anti-Romanian narratives of the time. Tănase, and the business, were subject to racist abuse and vandalism during the 3 to 4 years he ran the restaurant. The business ran until the early 2000s. The building was raided by Gardaí as a grow house in 2012, and has been derelict since. The building is on the Dublin City Council's Record of Protected Structures and was purchased by the HSE to expand its neighbouring Social Inclusion and Addiction Service as part of a wider plan to develop a number of buildings on the street.
