= Albert L. Altman =

Irish-Jewish politician

Albert L. Altman (1853–1903) was an entrepreneur and owner of the largest salt manufacturer and distributor in Dublin for two decades (1882–1903) as well as a politically active Irish nationalist who served as a councillor for Usher's Quay Ward on Dublin Corporation from 1901 to 1903.

Altman's influence as a Temperance-Labour leader and member of the post-Parnellite Irish National Federation (INF) included a reputation for support of the working classes and unions, governmental financial reform, urban modernization, and loquaciousness in his campaign speeches and motions in Council chambers in Dublin City Hall.

Altman's public arguments with Lord Mayor Timothy Harrington were regularly reported in the Dublin press, making Altman one of the most visible members of the Council during his tenure and the only city official known widely during the era as having come from a Jewish immigrant family to Ireland.

Through his notoriety as a Dublin figure involved in William O'Brien's Plan of Campaign, a victim of public Jew-baiting by his opponents, and his leadership on Corporation projects such as the city's Main Drainage System and his proposed public ownership of the Dublin United Tramways Company (DUTC), Altman's politics, personality, and Jewish background have been noted by scholars as parallel aspects of James Joyce's protagonist Leopold Bloom in his novel Ulysses (1922).

== Early life ==
=== Childhood and schooling: 1853–1875 ===
Albert Liebes Lascar Altman was born in the Grand Duchy of Posen in Prussian Poland in 1853 and arrived in Ireland later that year when his parents, Moritz (born Shagra Moshe ben Aharon) and Deborah (born Devorah bat Chaim Liebes), immigrated to Dublin. Moritz was a milliner and tailor of military headgear and uniforms and set up his home and shop at 48 Capel Street, the area of the City where the first substantial Jewish community of Dublin had established itself by the 1820s. The family were members of the Mary's Abbey synagogue from 1855 until Altman and his younger brother Mendal's names were expunged from the membership roll for marrying out of the faith.

Altman completed a religious education at the Mary's Abbey cheder, and afterwards was enrolled and earned honors during adolescence at the Collegiate, Nautical, and Mercantile School, located at 80 Abbey Street.

=== Joining the family business: 1875 ===
Altman graduated in 1875 and began to work in his father's business, which by then had expanded into coal and salt distribution and relocated to No. 5 Pembroke Quay. Moritz Altman had purchased this home as more suitable for his military tailoring business, as it sat just below Collins barracks at Arbour Hill. In 1876 M. Altman & Son Salt Merchants and Salt Drum Manufacturers were accused by Lord Mayor Hugh Tarpey of falsifying the weights of their products during a wider weights and measure scandal on the Dublin docks. Although exonerated, the Altmans felt singled-out as Jewish merchants during the case, and this perceived injustice subsequently compelled both brothers to join the Home Rule movement under the new leadership of Charles Stewart Parnell.

=== Marriage, business, and politics: 1877–1883 ===
The following year, autumn 1877, Altman protested voting procedures in the neighbouring Arran Quay Ward elections and suffered anti-Semitic slurs and Jew-baiting from both his opponents and the ward's constituency. Attending to business contacts in Cork in 1880, he met and soon married Susan O'Reilly in St. Finbarr's Church, South Parish, and began his life as a practising Roman Catholic—although no baptismal record for his conversion has ever been located.

The O'Reilly family included several relatives involved in the Irish Republican Brotherhood or Fenian cause, and Altman came under the influence of that movement during his marriage.The couple maintained contact throughout their life together with Susan Altman's cousin, American Civil War Lieutenant-Colonel Denis F. Burke, who was arrested and tried for treason in Ireland in 1866 for his role in planning the Fenian rising but had his sentence commuted through appeal by the U.S. government.

After marriage, the Altmans resided at No. 11 Usher's Island while the salt and coal business obtained Nos. 1–6 Bridgefoot Street as their new depot. The business remained for decades one of the largest of its kind in the city. The residence and offices on the quay is three doors down from the house that became the model for the Morkan family's Feast of the Epiphany dinner party in James Joyce's The Dead, and where Joyce's mother, May Murray, had singing and piano lessons in her youth.

Over the following decade, the area from the river up the hill to the depot became widely known in the city as "Altman the Saltman's". A son was born in 1881 but died 18 days later. Three years after, the couple's only surviving child, a girl named Mary Deborah, was born in 1884. The year of the first child's death, Moritz Altman also died through accidental poisoning in Aldershot, England, where he had relocated with his daughters to continue his tailoring business.

Over the next two decades Altman entered the arena of public life in Dublin where nationalist politics met economic and commercial power of the British empire by joining the Irish Home Manufacturers Association (IHMA), a ginger group created to promote Irish made goods, businesses, and domestic commodities. One of his co-founders was James Carey, a secret member of the ultra-nationalist Fenian offshoot group the Invincibles. During his trial in 1883 for his lead role in the Phoenix Park assassinations, Carey referenced "Altman the Saltman's" as a check point for a former plan to assassinate outgoing Irish Secretary, William "Buckshot" Forster. Soon after this, Altman and his fellow IHMA leaders disbanded the organization, which had come under suspicion as connected to Fenian activities.

== Later life ==
=== Temperance-Labour leader ===
From 1884 until his election to the Corporation in 1901, Altman attempted but failed repeatedly to gain office in both the Arran and Usher's Quay wards. During each of his campaign efforts he suffered Jew-baiting from both his rivals and their constituencies that most often took the form of calling him a charlatan, a foreigner, a German, or a Jew, suggesting he was not fit to be an Irish nationalist or an authentic Irishman.

During this period he became closely involved in William O'Brien's Plan of Campaign, the last movement of the Land Wars era in Ireland before the passing of the Wyndham Act in 1903. Altman became a major figure in Campaign activities in Dublin, making speeches in support of tenants' rights, leading gatherings, and hosting some of the movement's activists in his home on their release from prison. Like O'Brien, after Parnell's death, Altman joined the INF when the Irish Parliamentary Party split into this and the more petit-bourgeois Irish National League (INL) led by John Redmond.

By the early 1890s, Altman had also become a shareholder in the Freeman's Journal, and in that capacity succeeded along with John Dillon to wrest the control of the paper from Parnellite factions to their own "anti-Parnellite" INF influence. During this period Altman came under the sway of the Father Mathew Temperance crusade and also became committed to the new amalgamated unions movement; in the latter capacity, he participated in labour negotiations by representing the striking workers during the 1890 Coal Porters Strike, one of the first and organised labour activities in Dublin history.

From this point forward, Altman positioned himself within nationalist circles as a voice of Temperance-Labour, and soon began to campaign for office on this platform. After his many attempts at office, he was eventually elected to the Corporation as the Usher's Quay Ward representative in 1901. The following year, during his attempt to be reelected to his seat on the Council, Altman was endorsed by Arthur Griffith in his paper United Irishman as "the Temperance-Labour councillor", who, along with Socialist Leader James Connolly, was credited as leading the call to limit the impact the whiskey and pub trade had on working classes in the city.

=== Second marriage ===
In 1895, Susan Altman was diagnosed with acute lymphle sarcoma, a form of breast cancer, and died a few months later with Altman by her side. Over the next two years while promoting Temperance and conducting business in Belfast, Altman met and married Victoria Olive Corbett in Saint Anne's Church in that city on July 7, 1897.

=== Corporation Council ===
From 1901 until his death in November 1903, Altman achieved his widest notoriety in the city during his tenure on the Corporation Council. In this capacity he led the Improvements Committee to complete the Varty River reservoir Main Drainage Scheme, which established the first modern drinking and sewage systems in the City. The project and its many plumbing marvels are alluded to throughout Ulysses and in a longer passage in the Ithaca episode of Ulysses in particular.

Altman also protested the DUTC's price gouging and labour abuses, and put the forward-looking motion before the Council on many occasions that the City should purchase the entire system outright, only to be ridiculed and defeated time and again; he argued that the idea of public-owned utilities was a modern urban necessity especially befitting an independent Ireland concerned with labour rights and national unity. His admonitions proved relevant a decade later in the 1913 Dublin Lockout strike against the DUTC.

In 1902, Altman was at the centre of the controversy to offer no formal welcome to the city to the newly crowned Edward VII on his maiden visit to Ireland. The rift that this motion caused on both the Council during two public meetings and throughout nationalist circles in the city became a centerpiece of James Joyce's Dubliners' story Ivy Day in the Committee Room.

Another of Altman's projects on the Council, which would be his last before his untimely death, was his attempt to reform the long-running practice of rate-payment deferments for its members—an illegal nepotism that often resulted in tardiness of payments carried from year to year. Altman led a one-man campaign to investigate and reform the practice and by way of this again confronted insults and resistance from Mayor Harrington during a few open meetings reported in Dublin dailies. The two-week period of these proceeding were dubbed "the Rates Scandal" by the press, with the Freeman's Journal running a front-page story under the title "The Corporation Audit: Mr. Altman's Chargers Against His Fellow Members" on 9 October 1903. The inquest came to a close on 2 November with Harrington confirming that the practice was against Corporation policy and charging the Rates Office auditor to seek all delinquent payments immediately and going forward.

=== Death ===
The Rates Scandal was one of the most impactful actions Altman took during his career as a whistleblower and municipal reformer in Dublin. Two weeks later, Altman died of early-onset diabetes on 14 November 1903. He was buried in the plot he had formerly purchased for his infant son and wife in Glasnevin Cemetery, St. Brigid's Garden Section, no. 265. This subdivision of the ecumenical yet predominately Catholic facility also contains the grave of John Joyce's close acquaintance Mathew Kane, model for the character of Martin Cunningham in Ulysses; Kane's plot is a few yards from Altman's, while John and May Joyce are buried in an adjacent section to this.

=== Legacy ===
The Altman name continued to appear in the Dublin press long after Altman's death in part through Altman's brother Mendal's election to the same Usher's Quay Ward seat from 1907 to 1912. The name was also sustained in the public eye through a civil suit brought by Victoria against the Altman estate; reported under the title Altman vs. Altman, the proceedings of the case appear in the Dublin press from 1904 until 1910. Altman & Sons remained in business until 1922, operating under the ownership of the English firm Henry Seddon & Sons, Ltd. during its final decade.

== Influence on the work of James Joyce ==
Scholars of Joyce's work have argued that Altman is an overlooked model for the character of Leopold Bloom and his associated themes in Ulysses. Aspects of Altman's Temperance-Labour advocacy appear in Leopold Bloom's reputation as a teetotaller and as a working Dubliner sympathetic to skilled and unskilled labour. Like Altman, Bloom's loss of an infant son and remorse over his father's self-poisoning frame his struggle with Jewish identity throughout the novel. The Corporation's influence on nationalist Dublin becomes a leitmotif within the novel as well, while Bloom's ideas about the city's progress echo Altman's projects, such as municipal ownership of the tram system. The novel also alludes to Harrington's time in office, tardy rate payments by politicians, and the work of the Altman-led Improvements Committee in modernizing the city's infrastructure: the main drainage scheme and its new plumbing technologies are alluded to throughout Ulysses and in the "Ithaca" episode at length. Bloom sustains a self-consciousness about his marginality as a Dubliner with a Jewish background throughout the novel, despite having, like Altman, converted to Catholicism. Over the course of his day, Bloom is the target of anti-Jewish stereotyping and Jew baiting; in the "Cyclops" episode, he is also characterized as an annoyingly long-winded know-it-all, a reputation Altman earned during his political career as well.
