= Brian Hogan (architect) =

Irish architect

- Born: 28 December 1928; Dublin, Ireland
- Died: 6 August 2020 (aged 91)
- Education: Catholic University School; University College Dublin
- Occupation: Architect
- Practice: Brian Hogan Architects
- Buildings: Lansdowne House; Mater Private Hospital; Beaumont Hospital

Brian Hogan (28 December 1928 – 6 August 2020) was an Irish architect best known for designing various concrete brutalist office blocks in Dublin, Ireland throughout the 1970s and 1980s. In later life, he was regrettably referred to as part of the infamous "rubble club".

== Early life ==
Hogan was born in Booterstown to Sheila and Sarsfield Hogan, a senior civil servant and aide to Eamon De Valera as Taoiseach.

== Notable buildings ==
- Lansdowne House, Dublin
- Oisin House (demolished)
- Setanta Centre
- Canada House (demolished)
- Mater Private Hospital
- Beaumont Hospital
- Wilton Place (1984), the former site of Fitzwilliam Lawn Tennis Club, now demolished
