= Wynn's Hotel, Dublin =

Hotel in Dublin, Ireland

Wynn's Hotel
- Ostán Wynn
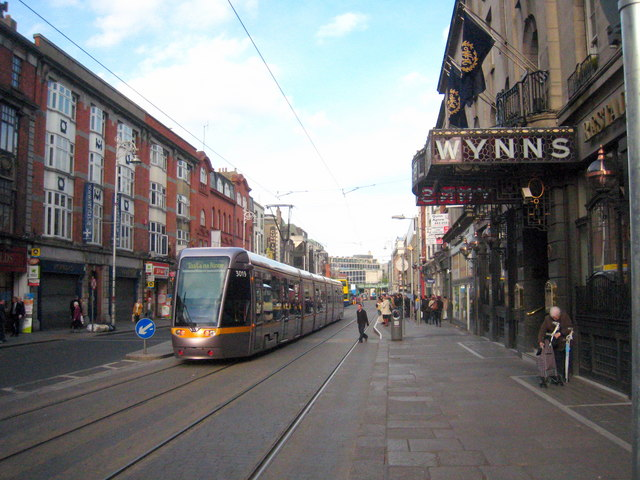
- The façade of Wynn's Hotel on Abbey Street

- Location within Central Dublin

General information
- Location: 35-39 Lower Abbey Street, Dublin 1, Dublin, Ireland
- Coordinates: 53°20′54.031″N 6°15′31.277″W
- Named for: Phoebe Wynn
- Opened: 17 December 1926; 99 years ago
- Operator: Wynn's Hotel Limited

Design and construction
- Architect: Peter Russell
- Main contractor: G&T Crampton

Website
- www.wynnshotel.ie

Wynn's Hotel is a historic hotel located on Abbey Street in Dublin, Ireland. Originally opened as a boarding house in 1845, the hotel played a vital role leading up to the 1916 Easter Rising and other significant Irish events. The hotel was rebuilt and opened on 17 December 1926 and is one of the best-known hotels in Dublin.

== History ==
=== Early years ===
The hotel opened in 1845 as a boarding house at 36 Lower Abbey Street by Phoebe Wynn. Wynn was well connected with the Church of Ireland and the establishment was popular with Church of Ireland clergy staying in Dublin. Wynn ran the boarding house until 1852 when it was sold. The change of ownership meant, however, that it now became the favoured city haunt of the Catholic clergy. In 1878, the hotel's name changed to Telford's Commercial Hotel but when the hotel was acquired by the Clarence Hotel Company in 1898, the name was reverted to Wynn's. The first proprietor, Phoebe Wynn, died on 13 January 1883 aged 84.

=== Foundation of the Irish Volunteers, Cumann na mBan and the Easter Rising ===
Wynn's hotel was the venue for a meeting of Irish nationalists, held on 11 November 1913, with a view to forming an armed body. The meeting was arranged by Bulmer Hobson and The O'Rahilly, and chaired by Eoin MacNeill which resulted in the creation of the Irish Volunteers. Within hours of the meeting, the hotel was visited by two detectives who advised the manager not to hold such meetings in future; nonetheless, subsequent meetings of the committee were held at the hotel. A plaque in the hotel bar commemorates the first meeting. On 2 April 1914, Cumann na mBan, a women's auxiliary of the Volunteers, was formed at a meeting of nationalist women in Wynn's, chaired by Agnes O'Farrelly. During the Easter Rising of April 1916, the hotel was burned to the ground as it was set on fire by incendiary bullets which were hitting a street barricade erected outside. Due to the fighting going on at the time within the city, firefighters were unable to save the hotel. Guests and staff were accommodated in the Clarence Hotel located on the opposite side of the River Liffey on Wellington Quay.

=== Rebuilding Wynn's ===
In 1921, the hotel began being rebuilt using mass concrete, the first building to do so in the city of Dublin at the time. Due to the Irish Civil War in 1922–23, construction was halted indefinitely. By 1925, the hotel was nearing completion with the management planning for a grand reopening by the end of 1926. The hotel reopened after being rebuilt by G&T Crampton on 17 December 1926, ten years after its destruction.
