= Uinseann MacEoin =

Irish architect, journalist, and campaigner

- MacEoin, c. 1997

Personal details
- Born: Vincent O'Rahilly McGuone; 4 July 1920; Pomeroy, County Tyrone, Ireland, United Kingdom
- Died: 21 December 2007 (aged 87); Shankill, County Dublin, Ireland
- Political party: Clann na Poblachta
- Occupation: Architect

Military service
- Branch/service: Irish Republican Army

Uinseann Ó Rathaille MacEoin (4 July 1920 – 21 December 2007) was an Irish architect, journalist, republican campaigner and historian. Born into an Irish republican family, MacEoin became involved with the Irish Republican Army during World War II and was interned alongside other republicans by the Irish government, who feared the IRA would draw Ireland into the war. In the decades after his internment, MacEoin would emerge as an influential architect who became involved with the preservation of historic sections of Dublin's inner city. Additionally, MacEoin remained interested in republicanism and would publish a number of books covering the history of Irish republicanism. As part of his research for these books, MacEoin would conduct oral interviews with other Irish republicans and record them; these recordings now serve as the core of a massive oral history collection held by the Irish Defence Forces.

== Early life and family ==
Uinseann Ó Rathaille MacEoin was born Vincent O'Rahilly McGuone in Pomeroy, County Tyrone on 4 July 1920. His parents were Catherine (née Fox) and Malachy McGuone. His father owned the Central Hotel in Pomeroy and was a wine and spirit merchant. He had 3 siblings. Both of his parents were nationalists, and named all their children after leaders of the Easter Rising in 1916. Under the first Dáil in 1918, Malachy McGuone was appointed a judge. This resulted in him being interned the prison ship Argenta on Larne Lough from 1922 to 1923. The family moved to Dublin after his release. Malachy died in 1933, which led to his wife running a workingmen's café in East Essex Street. The family later lived on Marlborough Road, Donnybrook.

He married Margaret Russell in 1956 in Navan, County Meath. They had a daughter and two sons. He died in a nursing home in Shankill, County Dublin on 21 December 2007. His estate at the time of his death was valued at over €3 million. His son, Nuada, took over his father's architectural practice.

== Republican activities ==
MacEoin attended boarding school at Blackrock College, and was then articled to the architectural practice of Vincent Kelly in Merrion Square. As an active republican, he lived in a house on Northumberland Road from later 1939 to May 1940 where he helped in the production and distribution of an Irish Republican Army (IRA) weekly newspaper, War News. The IRA was banned by the Irish government in 1936, and its bombing campaign in Britain in 1939 was viewed by the government as a threat to Irish neutrality. MacEoin was among a group of republicans arrested in June 1940 and imprisoned in Arbour Hill for a year. Once released, he was rearrested and interned at the Curragh for 3 years. He was sentenced to 3-months imprisonment in October 1943 for possession of incriminating documents. He had also been charged with possession of ammunition, but MacEoin testified he was given the rounds against his will, and never appears to have engaged in any violence. During his internment, he was taught Irish by Máirtín Ó Cadhain and was exposed to the socialist views of his fellow inmates. It was at this time that he adopted the Irish form of his name, Uinseann MacEoin.

== Architectural career ==
While imprisoned in the 1940s, MacEoin continued his studies by correspondence and qualified as an architect in 1945 at University College Dublin. His designs for a memorial garden in 1946 to those who died during the War of Independence were commended. In 1959, he designed the site in Ballyseedy, County Kerry for a monument by Yann Renard-Goulet commemorating those killed in the Civil War and members of the IRA from Kerry who died. In 1948, he qualified in town planning, and took up a position with Michael Scott's architectural practice. He worked for a short time with Dublin Corporation, with their housing department, before establishing his own practice in 1955.

He entered into a partnership with Aidan Kelly in 1969 as MacEoin Kelly and Associates. In the early 1970s, MacEoin designed a shopping and housing development outside Dundalk, called Ard Easmuinn. During the 1950s, he was a contributing editor on interior design in Hugh McLaughlin's magazine Creation, becoming editor of Irish Architect and Contractor in 1955. Throughout the 1960s and 1970s, MacEoin continued as an influential architectural journalist, founding and editing Build from 1965 to 1969, and later Plan. His company, Pomeroy Press, published Plan along with other serials such as Stream and Field. MacEoin wrote a large proportion of the copy in these periodicals, much under his own name, but he also used pseudonyms, in particular in Plan as "Michael O'Brien". He wrote about his strong views on social housing, national infrastructure, and foreign and slum landlords, often libellously.

== Political activism ==
Despite his republican and socialist views, he was a staunch advocate for the preservation of Georgian Dublin, and campaigned for their preservation. On this topic, he wrote letters to newspapers, took part in television and radio discussions, wrote comment pieces and editorials, spoke at public hearings, and took part in direct protests such as sit-ins in buildings including those on Baggot Street, Pembroke Street, Hume Street, and Molesworth Street. He was also an active member of the Irish Georgian Society and he campaigned actively against the road widening schemes in Dublin the 1970s and 1980s.

He and his wife bought 5 Georgian houses on Mountjoy Square and 3 on Henrietta Street in the 1960s, all almost derelict. They refurbished them and leased them out, under the company name Luke Gardiner Ltd. He renamed 5 Henrietta Street James Bryson House. His architectural practice moved into one of the Mountjoy Square houses. Along with fellow campaigners, Mariga Guinness and Deirdre Kelly, this demonstrated that these buildings could be salvaged and were not the dangerous structures other architects and developers claimed them to be. MacEoin also bought and saved Heath House, near Portlaoise, County Laois, living there towards the end of his life. He offered free conservation and architectural advise to community groups, and was a volunteer on the renovation works on projects including Tailors Hall.

He remained politically active, joining Clann na Poblachta, the Wolfe Tone Society, the Dublin Civic Group, the Northern Ireland Civil Rights Association and the Irish Anti-Apartheid Movement. To what extent MacEoin was involved in republican or IRA activities after 1945 is not clear. However, in March 1963 MacEoin was called a witness to a case in Scotland involving a Glasgow bookmaker by the name of Samuel Docherty and the Royal Bank of Scotland. Docherty claimed the bank owed him £50,000. MacEoin testified that in February 1962 he had travelled with £50,000 in cash from Dublin to lodge to Docherty's account in the Royal Bank of Scotland in Belfast, as a loan. When asked about the origin of this large sum of money, MacEoin stated it was supplied by another person, but would not divulge that person's name. This immediately triggered the court's suspicions and the Judge warned MacEoin he would be contempt of court if he did not name the supplier of the money. MacEoin was placed in police custody for the day, and eventually he agreed to give the name in writing in confidence to the Judge. The Judge ultimately ruled that Docherty was guilty of attempted fraud and perjury and that MacEoin's involvement reeked of criminality. However, no further action was ever brought forward against Docherty or MacEoin.

In Sinn Féin's 1971 Éire Nua social and economic programme, MacEoin wrote the chapter on 'Planning', and attended meetings in Monaghan in the early 1970s on the Dáil Uladh, a parliament for the 9-county Ulster. In 1981, during the republican hunger strikes, one of his Mountyjoy Square houses was used as the national headquarters of the National H-Block Committee. Following the 1986 Sinn Féin split, MacEoin supported Republican Sinn Féin. He was a founding member of the Constitutional Rights Campaign in 1987, a group which aimed to protect the rights of Irish citizens in the European Community, having campaigned against Ireland joining the EEC in the early 1970s. In 1978, he was sentenced to 2 weeks in Mountjoy Prison for non-payment of a fine issued for not having a television licence. He had refused to buy one to protest the lack of Irish language programming.

As an environmentalist, MacEoin opposed private car ownership, and advocated for cycleways and the redevelopment of the railway lines. He wrote about the "greenhouse effect" as early as 1969. As a hill walker and mountaineer, he claimed to be the first Irishman to register successful climbs of all 284 Scottish peaks, known as the Munros, in 1987. He also climbed in the Alps and the Pyrenees.

== Writer and historian ==
MacEoin wrote 3 books on his memories, and those of his former comrades, in 3 books: Survivors (1980), on the lives of leading Irish republicans; Harry (1986), a part biography part autobiography of Harry White, and The IRA in the twilight years 1923–48 (1997). He also published a novel, Sybil: a tale of innocence (1992) with his publishing house, Argenta, under the name Eoin O'Rahilly. MacEoin also interviewed and recorded dozens of Republicans as part of his research for his books; these recordings would later be converted into a digital oral history archive held in trust by the Irish Defence Forces.

== Bibliography ==
- Survivors (1980)
- Harry (1986)
- The IRA in the twilight years 1923–48 (1997)
- Sybil: a tale of innocence (1992)
