= Oliver Bond flats =

Flats complex in central Dublin, Ireland

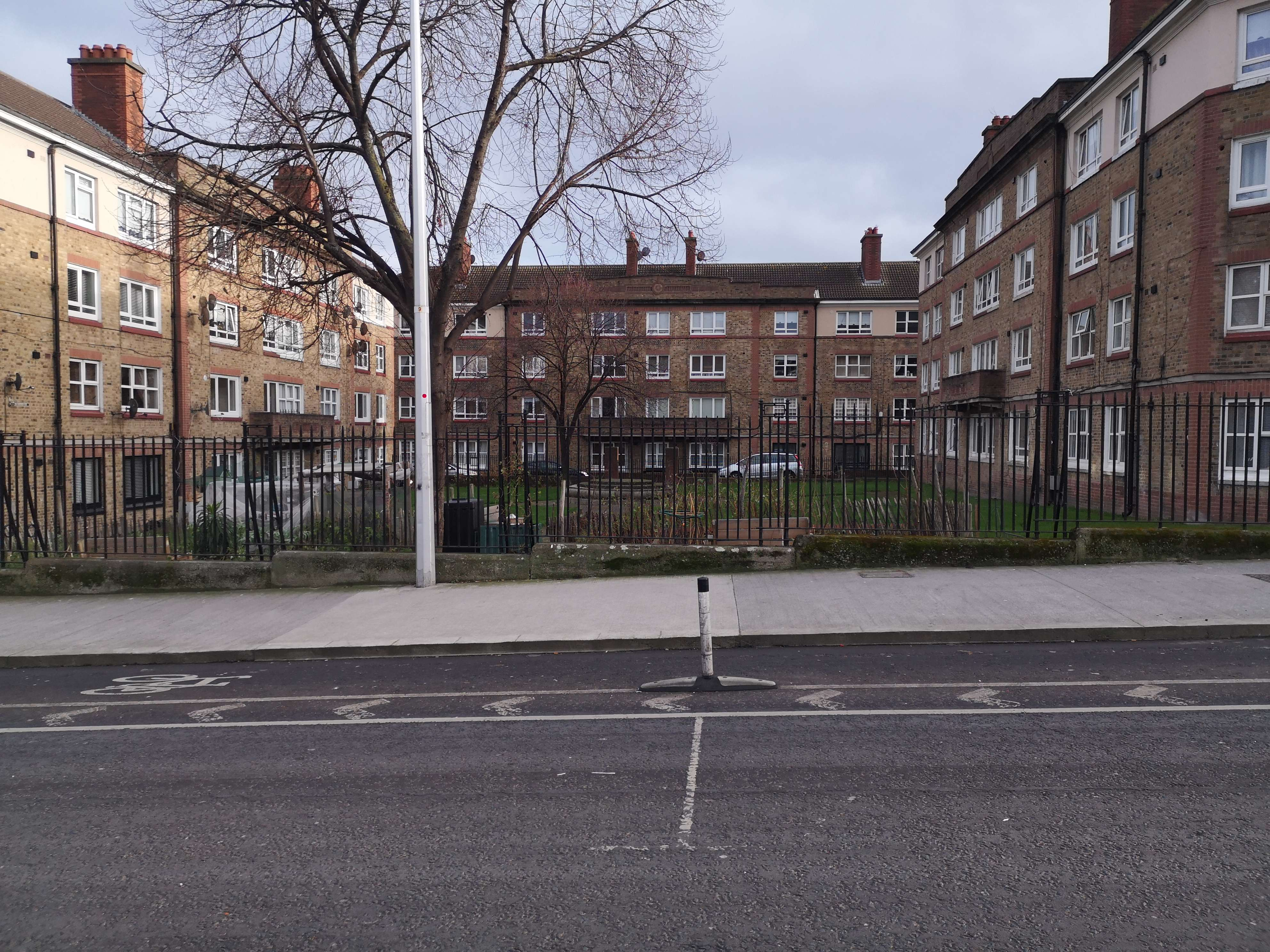
- Oliver Bond Flats, as seen from Bridgefoot Street.
- Interactive map of Oliver Bond flats

General information
- Coordinates: 53.34475°N 6.27966°W
- No. of units: 391

Construction
- Constructed: 1936
- Architect: Herbert George Simms
- Style: Art Deco trimmings

Oliver Bond flats, also known as Oliver Bond House, is a group of blocks of flats in the Liberties area of Dublin, Ireland. They were designed by Herbert George Simms and built in 1936. They are named after Oliver Bond, a member of the Society of United Irishmen from Ulster.

== Buildings ==
The buildings were designed with Art Deco trimmings and are named alphabetically from A to T with the letters I, J, K and Q omitted. The site is bounded by Oliver Bond Street, Bridgefoot Street, Usher Street and Usher's Quay.

== History ==
=== Before the flats ===
The area used to be the site of a brewery called The Anchor which was founded in 1740. This was later owned by a son of Daniel O'Connell. Rivalry with the Guinness Brewery was intense, even extending to politics – in the 1841 election there was a boycott of Guinness "Protestant porter".

=== Employment ===
Many residents were employed in local factories, such as a mattress factory on Manor Street, a matchstick factory, sewing factories or the Winstanley shoe factory. There was a popular belief that the residents were all employed in the Guinness Brewery, but according to a resident this is not true. The area was always poor, but there was plenty of employment for decades and though people could not always afford what they made, shoe factory employees could get shoes.

One resident was an Irish Army soldier who served in the United Nations Operation in the Congo and survived the Niemba ambush.

Many factories closed in the 1970 and 1980s, leaving only a factory that makes clothing labels.

=== 80th anniversary celebrations ===
Local residents collected an archive of materials relating to the history of the flats, including personal photos. They also held talks on Herbert Simms and the role of public housing in Irish society.

=== Crime ===
Residents have complained to the Garda Síochána about heroin and crack cocaine dealing in the flats. It is connected to the Kinahan gang.

After the murder of Eddie Hutch Snr, part of the Kinahan-Hutch feud, friends and relatives of the Kinahans living in the flats were advised to move out of their homes.

== Impact of state of buildings on residents' health ==
=== Care, Health, and Housing Workshop (2022) ===
The Care, Health, and Housing workshop was a collaborative and interdisciplinary event held October 18, 2022, at the Digital Hub Development Agency in Dublin 8, Ireland. Organized by Dr. Lidia K.C. Manzo, an assistant professor at the University of Milan and Marie Skłodowska-Curie, a fellow at Maynooth University, the workshop aimed to explore the intersection between housing, health, and social justice in the context of social housing in Dublin’s Liberties neighborhood. The event was developed in partnership with Maynooth University Social Sciences Institute, the Digital Hub, the Robert Emmet Community Development Project, and the National College of Art and Design.

The workshop sought to highlight the severe public health challenges caused by inadequate housing, particularly the high levels of damp, mold, poor ventilation, and overcrowding in social housing estates such as Oliver Bond House. Discussions centered on human rights mechanisms and tenant rights, emphasizing the need for a joint approach between housing and health sectors to improve living conditions. Key speakers included housing policy expert Rory Hearne, housing solicitor Mary Heavey, and community leaders from Oliver Bond House, who provided firsthand accounts of living in substandard housing. Data and technology were also a central theme, with experts discussing how open data networks and citizen science projects, such as DIY air quality sensors, could empower residents and inform policy decisions.

=== Inadequate Social Housing and Health: The Case of Oliver Bond House (2023) ===
First published in November 2023, Inadequate Social Housing and Health: The Case of Oliver Bond House, The Liberties, Dublin is a peer-reviewed research article by Lidia Katia C. Manzo and Hannah Grove, analyzing the health consequences of poor housing conditions in a social housing estate in Dublin 8. The study, published in Open Research Europe, draws on resident-led surveys and ethnographic research to examine the direct and indirect health effects of inadequate housing, particularly in the context of gentrification and the financialization of social housing.

The research identifies four main areas of concern: (1) physically harmful substandard housing conditions, (2) the emotional toll of an unsafe social environment, (3) the lack of child-friendly and community green spaces, and (4) constrained mobility due to inaccessible housing design. Findings reveal that 65% of Oliver Bond House residents reported negative health impacts due to inadequate housing, with conditions such as damp, cold, and poor ventilation leading to respiratory issues, anxiety, and social isolation. The paper advocates for a "City of Care" framework, which calls for housing policies that prioritize public health, resident empowerment, and community well-being. The study aligns with international human rights frameworks, emphasizing that housing should be treated as a public good rather than a financial asset.

=== Respiratory Health Among Residents of Oliver Bond House ===
In January 2024 the Respiratory Health Among Residents of Oliver Bond House report by the School of Medicine, Trinity College Dublin said that even after taking into account whether a patient had a medical card residents in the flats were "still 1.9 times as likely to have evidence for asthma in their medical records as other patients in the same practice". The report follows on from a 2021 report on the inadequate state of the buildings. The report was in cooperation with the Robert Emmet Community Development Project.

82.8% of residents reported problems with mould and damp in their homes, 35% reported sewage problems, over 55% had been told by a doctor that damp mould or sewage was contributing to their families ill-health and over 30% had water coming into their homes.

Gayle Cullen, chair of the Oliver Bond Resident's Group, said "People are living with considerable damp and mould. Most of the windows are ill-fitting, old, and draughty. It's impossible to keep the flats warm which puts an extra cost on residents along with the health burden. Older people and children particularly are really vulnerable to the effects of the cold, damp and mould spores. The Trinity School of Medicine report is great as it supports what we have been saying for years. These flats are hurting our health."

== In popular culture ==
- Comedian June Rodgers' character 'Oliver Bond' is a juxtaposition of the working-class character of the flats with the spy James Bond.
