= Lansdowne House, Dublin =

1960s office block in Dublin, Ireland

Lansdowne House
- Interactive map of the Lansdowne House area
- Etymology: Named after Lansdowne Road

General information
- Location: Dublin, Ireland
- Coordinates: 53.332861°N 6.2376003°W
- Completed: 1967

Technical details
- Floor count: 9
- Floor area: 65,000 sq ft (6,000 m^{2})

Design and construction
- Architect: Brian Hogan
- Developer: Hardwicke
- Main contractor: G&T Crampton

Lansdowne House is a 9-storey office block in Dublin, Ireland.

== History ==
Lansdowne House was completed in 1967, and is situated on the corner of Lansdowne Road and Northumberland Road in Ballsbridge, opposite the Ballsbridge Hotel, previously a Jurys Hotel. It was built by Hardwicke Ltd, and designed by Brian Hogan. It was initially built as the headquarters of Allied Irish Bank, on a site that had been occupied by a number of Victorian houses. The then Minister for Finance, Charles Haughey, officially opened the building in November 1967.

Upon its completion, the Office of Public Works took out a 65-year lease on the top 8 floors. The ground floor was occupied by a branch of Allied Irish Bank. IDA Ireland also rented space in the building for a period of time.

It was the first building in Dublin to be constructed using pre-cast units made on the site by the construction firm G&T Crampton. It was also the first building in Dublin to have drained and load-bearing pre-cast facade.

The building was sold in 1996 for £9 million. The building was refurbished in the 2010s, and is occupied by the Labour Court and Workplace Relations Commission.

== See also ==
- Setanta Centre
