= Herbert George Simms =

English architect

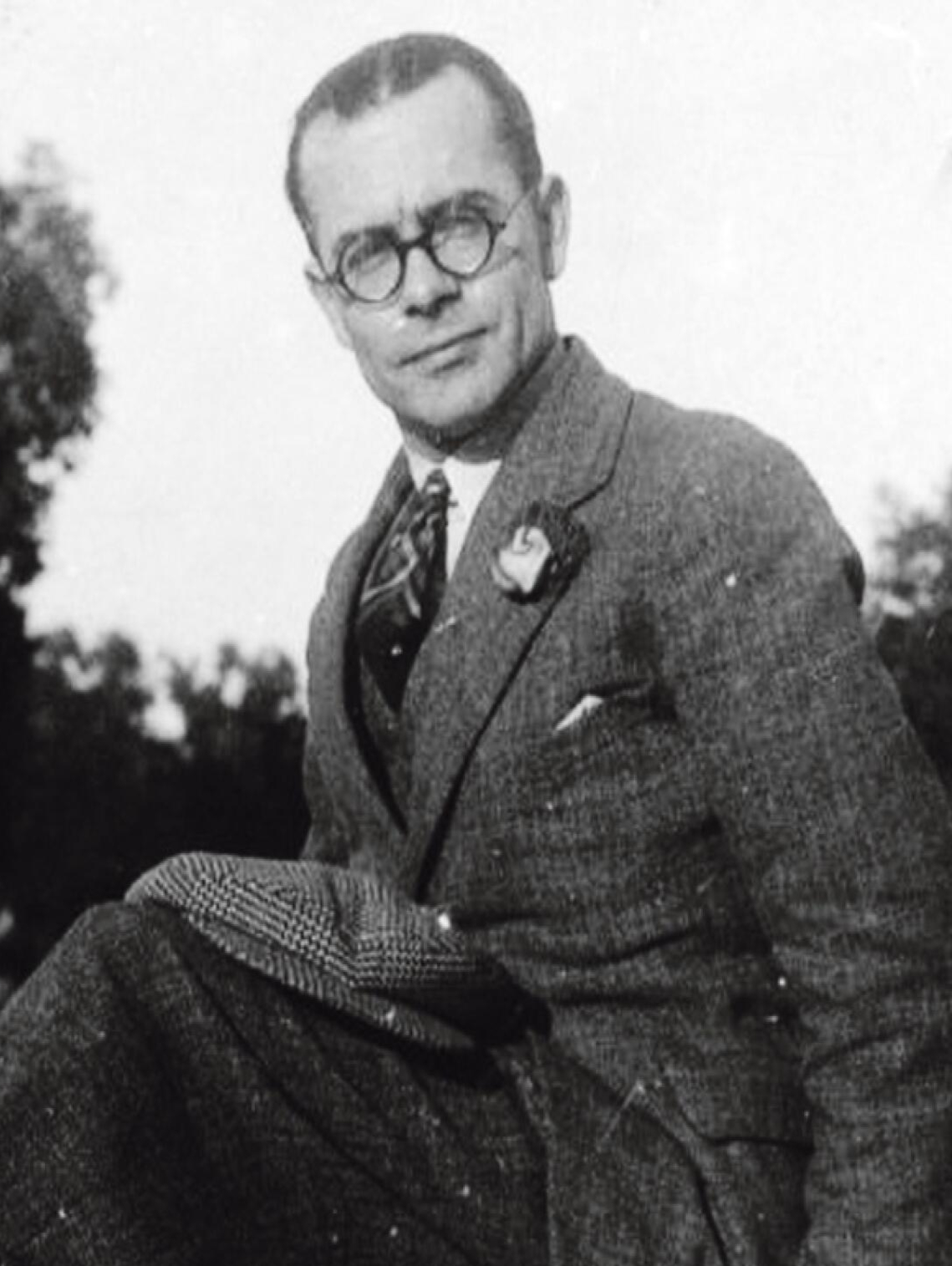
- Born: November 30, 1898; Kentish Town, London, England
- Died: September 28, 1948 (aged 49); Dún Laoghaire, County Dublin, Ireland
- Resting place: Deans Grange Cemetery, Dublin, Ireland
- Education: University of Liverpool
- Occupation: Architect
- Years active: 1920s–1948
- Spouse: Eileen Clarke (m. 1929)
- Practice: Dublin Corporation
- Buildings: St Audoen's House; Chancery Place Flats; Countess Markiewicz House; Greek Street Flats; Henrietta House; Oliver Bond Flats; Pearse House; Thorncastle Street Flats
- Projects: Dublin Corporation Housing Schemes (1932–1948)
- Design: Civic housing and flat complexes influenced by the Amsterdam School and European modernism

Herbert George Simms (30 November 1898 – 28 September 1948) was an English architect who worked as an architect for Dublin Corporation.

== Early life and education ==
He was the eldest of six children of George William Simms, a train driver and former shepherd, originally of Fawley, Buckinghamshire and his wife Nellie (née Worster) originally of Hemel Hempstead. His father had four older children from a previous marriage. He lived with the family on Prince of Wales Road, Kentish Town and was educated at the Haverstock Industrial and Commercial School. By 1911 the family had moved to 33 Victoria Road, with Herbert the oldest of the children still at home.

== Military career ==
During the First World War he served in the Royal Field Artillery. He was awarded an ex-service scholarship of £150 and tuition fees which allowed him to study architecture at Liverpool University.

== Architectural education ==
He began studies in October 1919 but had to abandon them for financial reasons when the three years ended. He had received the Certificate in Architecture in 1921 and passed the third and fourth years of the Diploma course. On grounds of previous office work and the standard of his studies he was permitted to sit the course for the Certificate in Civic Design which he was awarded in March 1923.

== Architectural career ==
After university he moved to Dublin, where he worked for a while in the office of Aubrey Vincent O'Rourke. In February 1925 he was appointed temporary architect to Dublin Corporation, working under Horace Tennyson O'Rourke, a role that was gradually extended and lasted until December 1927. In 1926 he was authorised to visit London, Liverpool and Manchester to examine the latest developments in flats.

In 1932 or 1933 a separate housing architect's department was formed to focus on the building of new houses and Simms was appointed to the new role of Corporation housing architect. He immediately recruited staff to work in the department. In the sixteen years he was in the post he was responsible for the construction of 17,000 residences, including both flats and houses.

His work on flats showed influences by Michel de Klerk, Jacobus Oud and Johannes van Hardeveld.

== Personal life ==
He married Eileen Clarke, daughter of Garda Superintendent Thomas Clarke on 30 September 1929.

== Death ==
After Horace O'Rourke retired in 1945, the pressure on Simms increased.

He had already suffered one nervous breakdown fifteen years before and on 28 September 1948 he took his own life by throwing himself under a train at Dún Laoghaire. A suicide note said that he felt overwork was threatening his sanity. He was buried in Deans Grange Cemetery.

== Notable works in Dublin ==
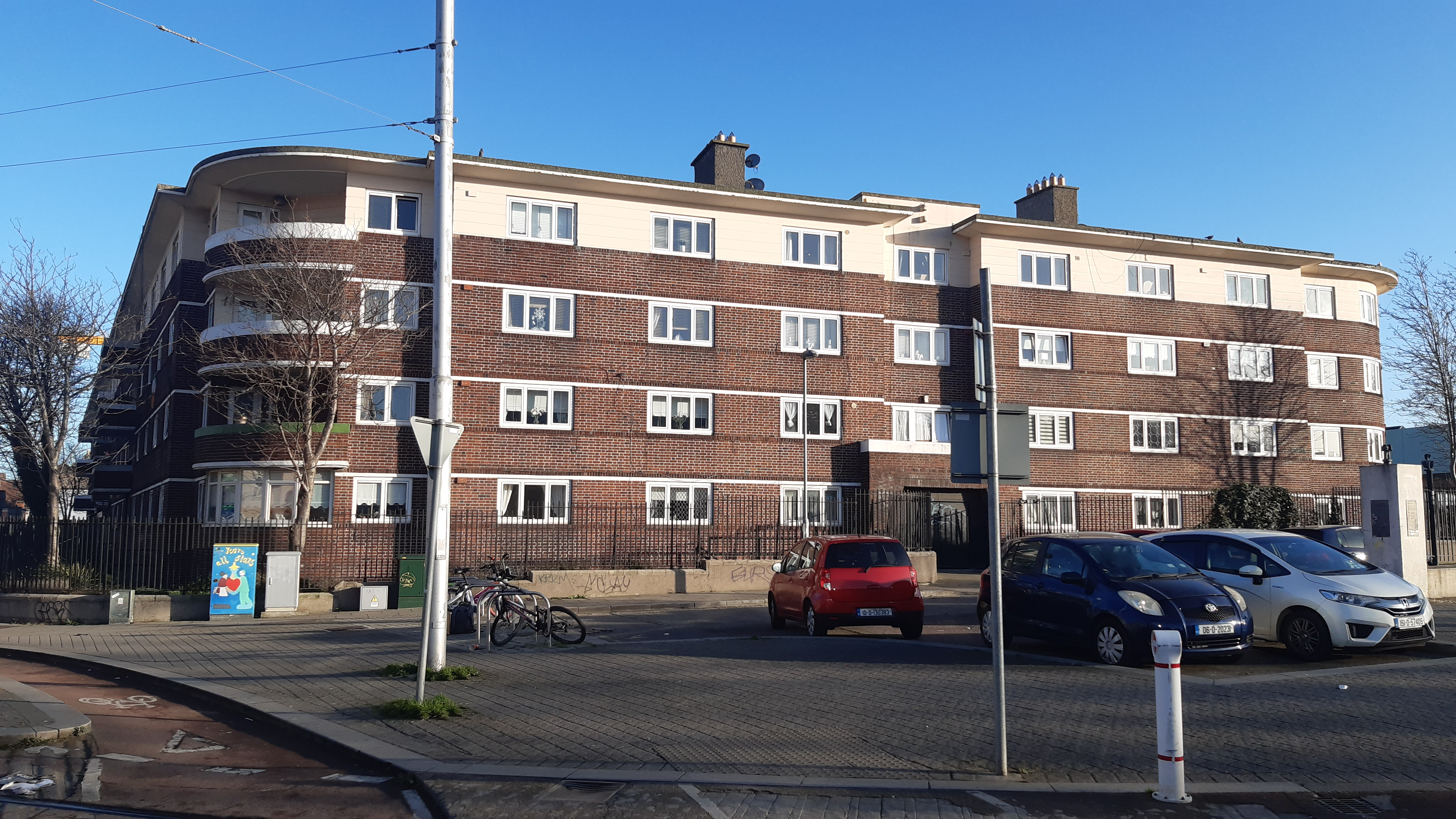
Mary Aikenhead House on James's Street in Dublin 8

- St Audoen's House, Cook Street
- Chancery Place Flats, Chancery Place (1935)
- Countess Markiewicz House, Townsend Street
- Greek Street Flats (officially 'Saint Michan's House'), Greek Street
- Henrietta House, Henrietta Place
- Mary Aikenhead House, James's Street
- Oliver Bond flats, Oliver Bond Street (1936) - sometimes known as Oliver Bond House
- Pearse House, Hanover Street East
- Thorncastle Street Flats, Thorncastle Street, Ringsend
