= Pearse House =

- Interactive map of the Pearse House area

General information
- Architectural style: Art Deco
- Coordinates: 53.34463°N 6.24553°W
- Completed: 1936

Design and construction
- Architect: Herbert George Simms

Pearse House is a flats complex in south inner city Dublin. It was designed by Herbert George Simms for Dublin Corporation and was built in 1936. It was designed in an Art Deco style.

== Buildings ==
It consists of several buildings, mostly in red brick.

Winged geometric mouldings draw an association with the aviation industry, which was growing rapidly at the time the complex was built.

In 2013, Jeanette Lowe, whose maternal grandmother was one of the first residents to be rehomed there, had an installation titled The Flats Pearse House: Village in the City with the National Photographic Archive As part of the installation, flat 3B was restored to its original state, including Corporation green painted walls, a bath in the kitchen and the original hardwood floors uncovered.

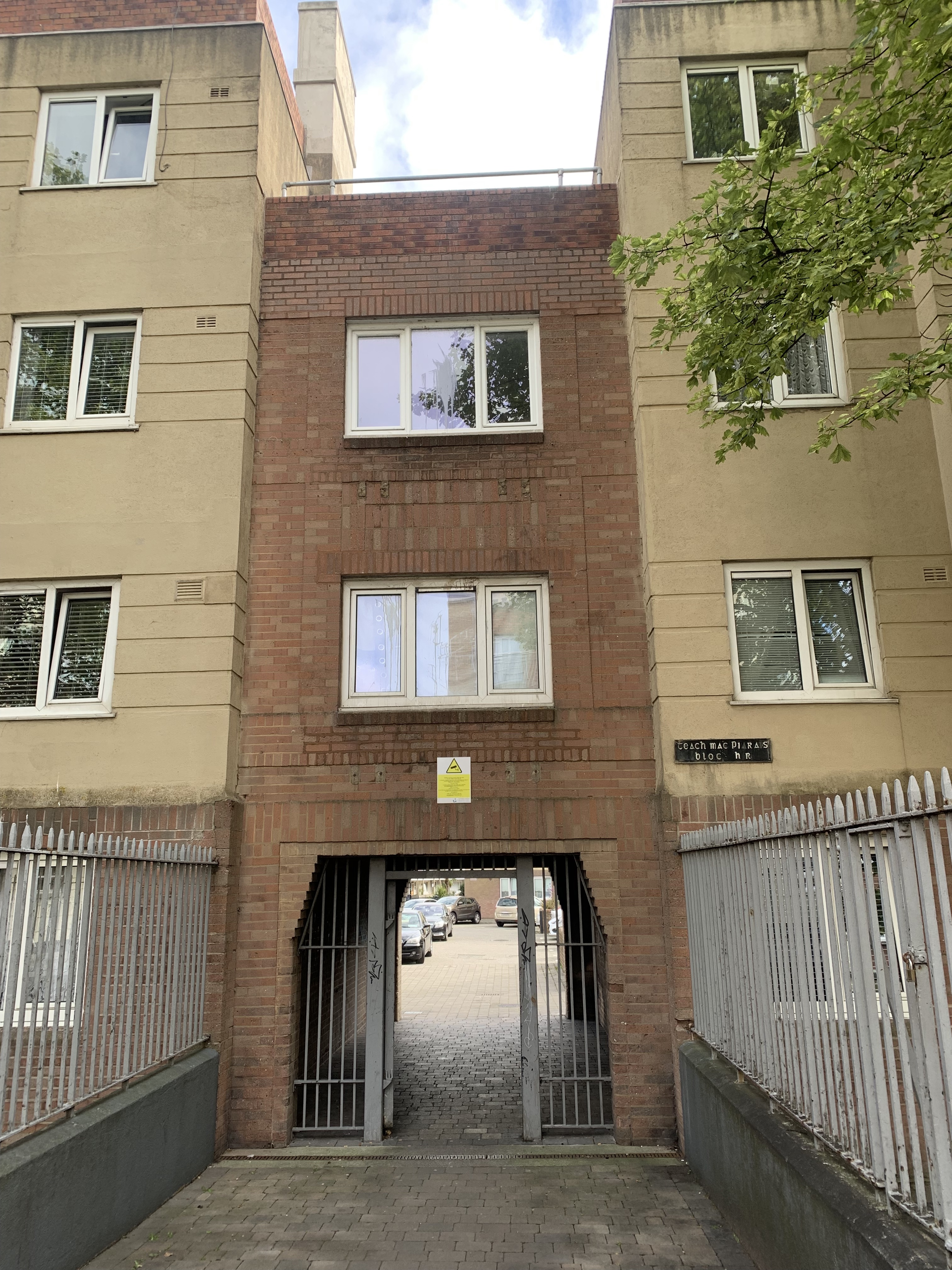
A red-brick section of Pearse House

== Location ==
The buildings are bounded by Hanover Street East to the north, Erne Street Lower to the east, Erne Place Lower to the south and both Sandwith Street Lower and Creighton Street to the west.

== Status ==
As of April 2021 it is on the Record of Protected Structures.
