= Peter Pearson (painter, born 1955) =

Irish artist, author, and historian

- Born: 1955 (age 70–71); Dublin
- Education: Kingstown School
- Alma mater: Trinity College, Dublin
- Known for: Architectural conservation and preservation, founding the Dublin Civic Trust

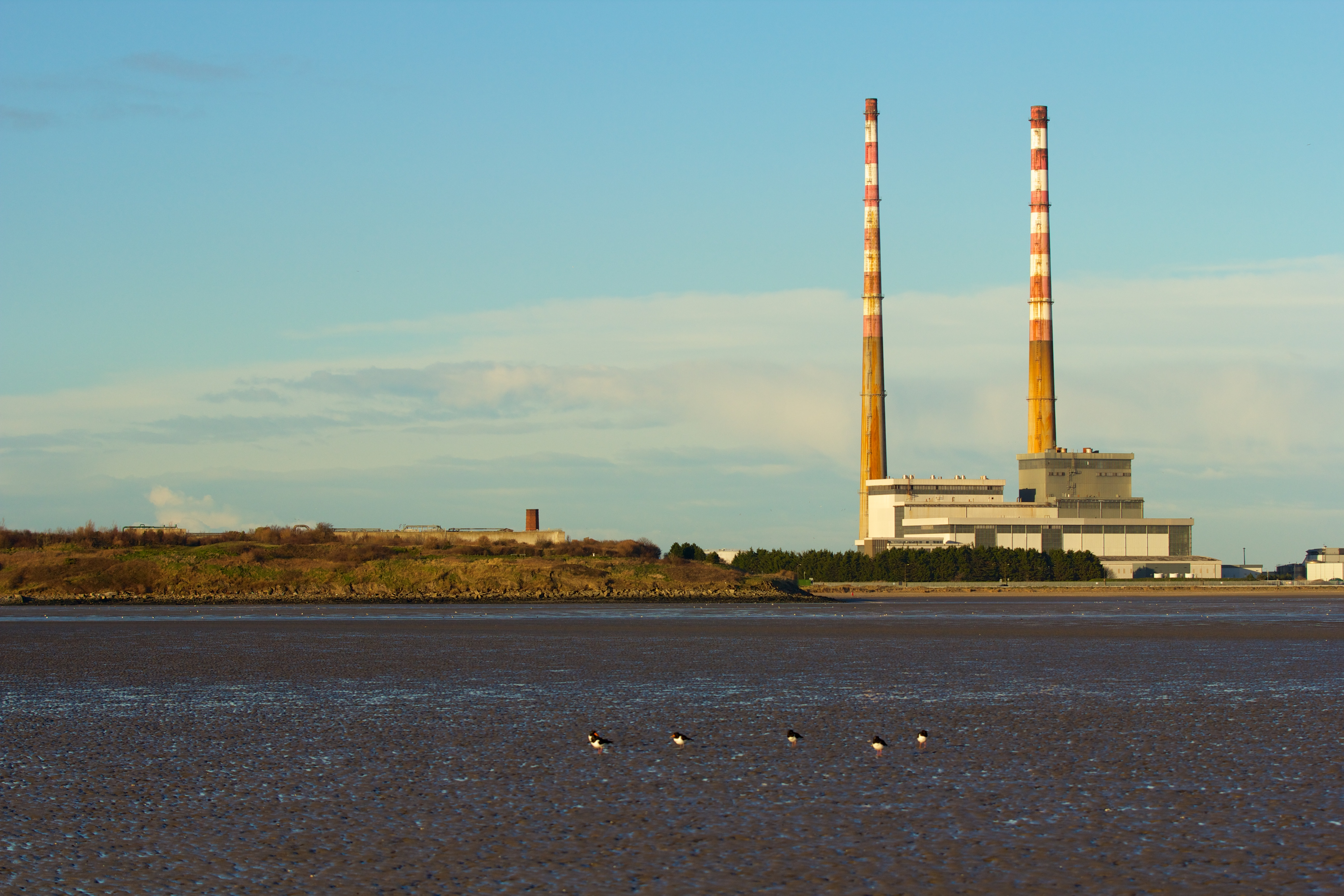
The Poolbeg stacks in Dublin Bay, the inspiration for many of Pearson's paintings

Every time you look across the bay at the chimneys, it’s a different mood and that light seems to reflect the mood of the city.

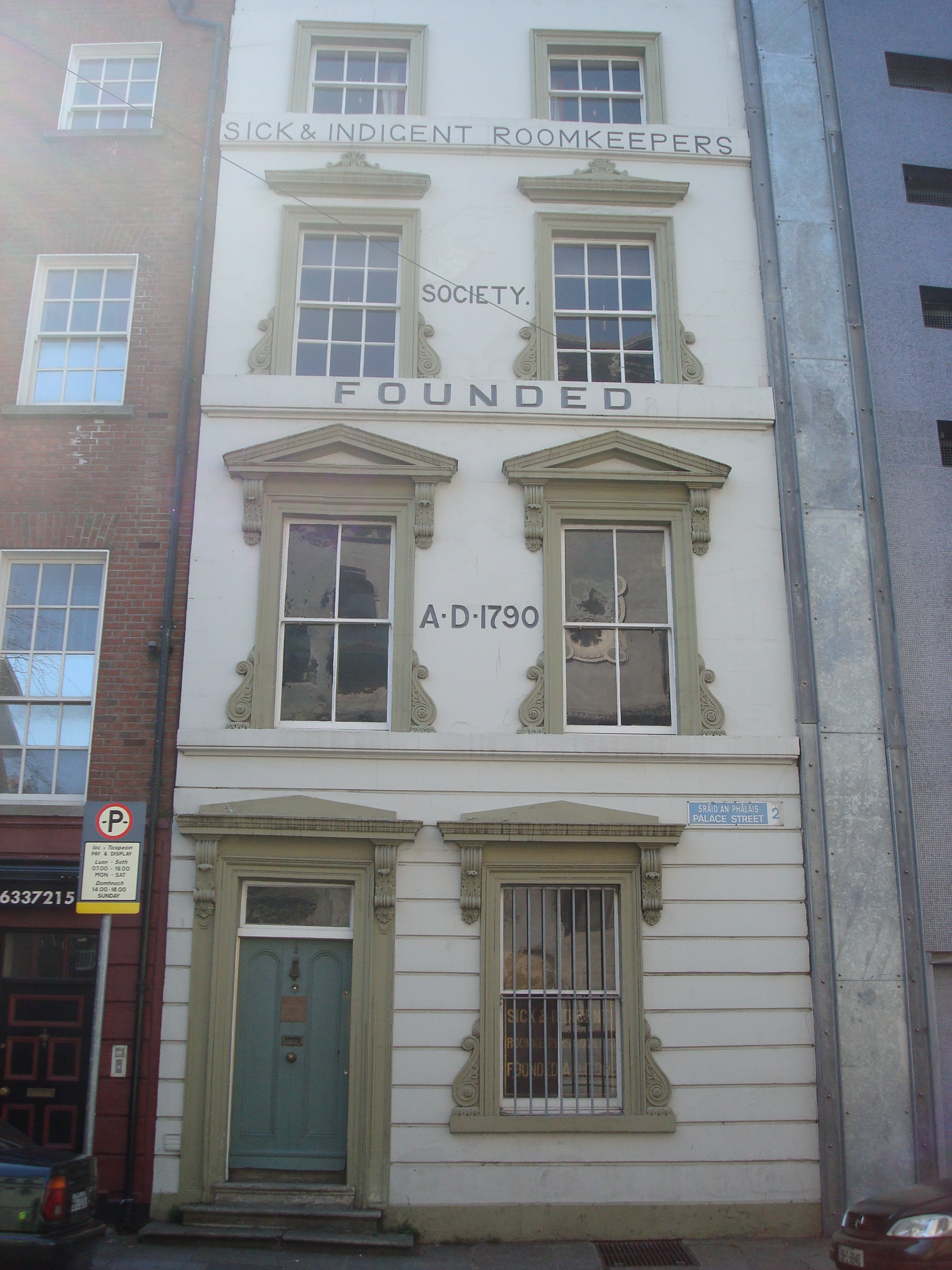
The old Sick and Indigent Roomkeepers' Society building — Pearson's home for 10 years

Peter Pearson (born 1955) is an Irish artist, author, historian, and conservationist.

== Biography ==
Pearson was born in 1955, a native Dubliner, and raised around the Dún Laoghaire area.

He was educated at the institution now known as Newpark Comprehensive School where he was later to return and teach art. He went to read Art History at Trinity College Dublin.

He held his first major solo exhibition in Venice in 1978 while studying on an Italian Government painting scholarship. He has also exhibited at Caen.

A short RTÉ seven minute film for Youngline presented by Teresa Mannion in 1984 showed the artifacts he was amassing in the house in Dublin he was sharing at that time with his brother. Mannion describes him thus: "He’s an ordinary man driven by an extraordinary obsession to record the day to day life of old Dublin". The film also showed him characteristically exploring builders skips for his artifacts collection. (Note: This could have been staged for the programme, but other references show he did this.)

Ian Lumley, the heritage officer for An Taisce in 1985 claimed that Pearson was responsible for the co-ordination of their 1985 report that identified the Temple Bar area by name and included a comprehensive historic and architectural inventory which led to its significance being re-evaluated and which led to Charles Haughey initiate a special government project to rehabilitate the area.

It was Pearson's interest in old buildings which led him to swing across a moat to Drimnagh Castle in 1985 and to initiate a multi-agency campaign to stop the demolition of the building and to bring about its restoration.

In 1992 Pearson was a joint founder-member of the Dublin Civic Trust.

He lived at the former The Sick and Indigent Roomkeepers' Society building near Dublin Castle for ten years.

As of 2014, he was living in the County Wexford countryside, painting about 30 pictures a year in spurts, some of farm animals with hints of surrealism. Irish comedian June Rodgers and husband possessed two of his paintings as of 2018.

In October 2015 Bonhams held an exhibition of his Architectural Heritage Dublin Fragments Collection at their Irish Office.

== Bibliography ==
Works Pearson has authored or co-authored include:

- Between the Mountains and the Sea, Dun Laoghaire-Rathdown County, which provides details of architectural heritage.
- The Heart of Dublin, about the development of Dublin's streetscapes.
- Decorative Dublin, describing decorative elements found on Dublin streets and buildings.
- The Heart of Dublin: Resurgence of an Historic City. O'Brien Press. 2000. ISBN 978-0-86278-668-7. OCLC 248417699.

== Sources ==
- Pearson, Peter (1981). Dun Laoghaire Kingstown. Dublin: O'Brien Press. ISBN 0-905140-83-4. OL 22450451M.
