= Conservation in the Republic of Ireland =

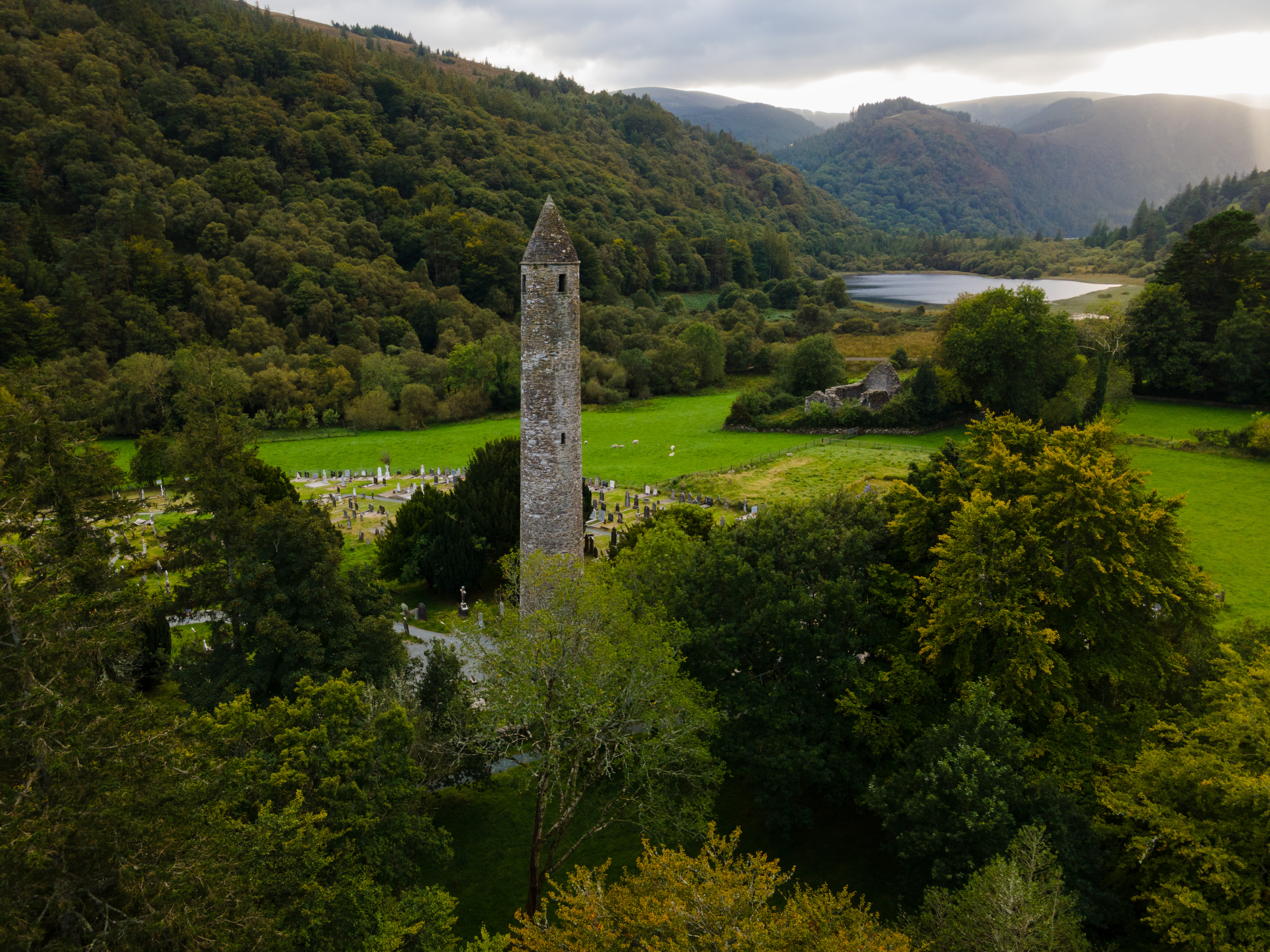
Natural sites within Glendalough Valley are protected by the National Parks and Wildlife Service. Historical sites within Glendalough are protected by the Office of Public Works.

Conservation in the Republic of Ireland is overseen by a number of statutory and non-governmental agencies, including those with responsibility for conservation of the built environment and conservation of the natural environment in Ireland. Conservation has sometimes been a contentious issue, with debates impacting its progress since the 1960s. Concrete initiatives are sometimes driven by European Union (EU) heritage protection and environmental policies, including EU environmental law, which – as a member – the Irish government is obliged to adopt and implement.

== Heritage conservation ==
Heritage conservation has been in place in Ireland since the formation as the state, with structures protected under local, national and international legislation.

=== National legislation ===
In the 1930s, a national policy was adopted in the form of the National Monuments Act, which established preservation orders, listed national monuments, and outlined standards, prohibitions, and regulations of archaeological objects. The National Monuments Service, an agency of the Office of Public Works, is responsible for National Monuments. As of 2020, the National Monuments Service had responsibility for the conservation of approximately 1,000 individual structures at over 760 different sites.

=== Local legislation ===
The Planning and Development Act 2000 establishes that each regional planning authority (administered by county and city councils in Ireland) is responsible for maintaining a Record of Protected Structures. These structures may be protected for conservation from an architectural, historical, archaeological, cultural, social or technical perspective. Owners or occupiers of a listed protected structure are obliged to prevent the structure from becoming endangered through damage or through neglect. As of 2020, the various Records of Protected Structures contained over 40,000 structures nationally.

=== International conventions ===
Ireland has been a member of UNESCO, the United Nations Educational, Scientific and Cultural Organization, since 1961. As of 2020, there are two UNESCO World Heritage Sites in the Republic of Ireland. These structures are in the Brú na Bóinne complex in County Meath and on Skellig Michael in County Kerry.

=== Non-government agencies ===
A number of non-government and voluntary organisations (including An Taisce (the National Trust for Ireland), the Dublin Civic Trust, the Irish Landmark Trust, and the Mining Heritage Trust of Ireland) undertake architectural conservation projects on a non-statutory basis.

== Environmental conservation ==
=== Statutory protections ===
One of the earliest environmental conservation initiatives in Ireland involved the hosting of an international wildlife seminar in 1970, which was part of its contribution to the European Conservation Year. This seminar played a role in the creation of the Forest and Wildlife Service, which was created in response to the seminar's recommendation for a centralized conservation agency in Northern Ireland. One of the primary functions of the agency involves the identification of sites for conservation purposes.

As of the 21st century, government agencies with responsibility for the protection and conservation of the natural environment include the Department of Communications, Climate Action and Environment, Environmental Protection Agency, and National Parks and Wildlife Service. The Local Government (Planning and Development) Act 1963 also affords some responsibility for environmental protection to local authorities in Ireland, who can control development in areas "outstanding natural beauty and/or special recreational value" by designating them a "Special Amenity Area".

=== Voluntary organisations ===
Voluntary and non-governmental agencies undertaking environmental conservation projects in Ireland include the Bilberry Goat Trust, Irish Peatland Conservation Council, and Native Woodland Trust. A number of these organisations are members of the Irish Environmental Network.

== See also ==
- Archaeological Survey of Ireland
- Heritage Council (Ireland)
- Development and preservation in Dublin
- List of heritage railways in the Republic of Ireland
- List of national parks of the Republic of Ireland
- List of nature reserves in the Republic of Ireland
- List of Special Areas of Conservation in the Republic of Ireland
