= Dublin Civic Trust =

Architectural conservation and educational trust

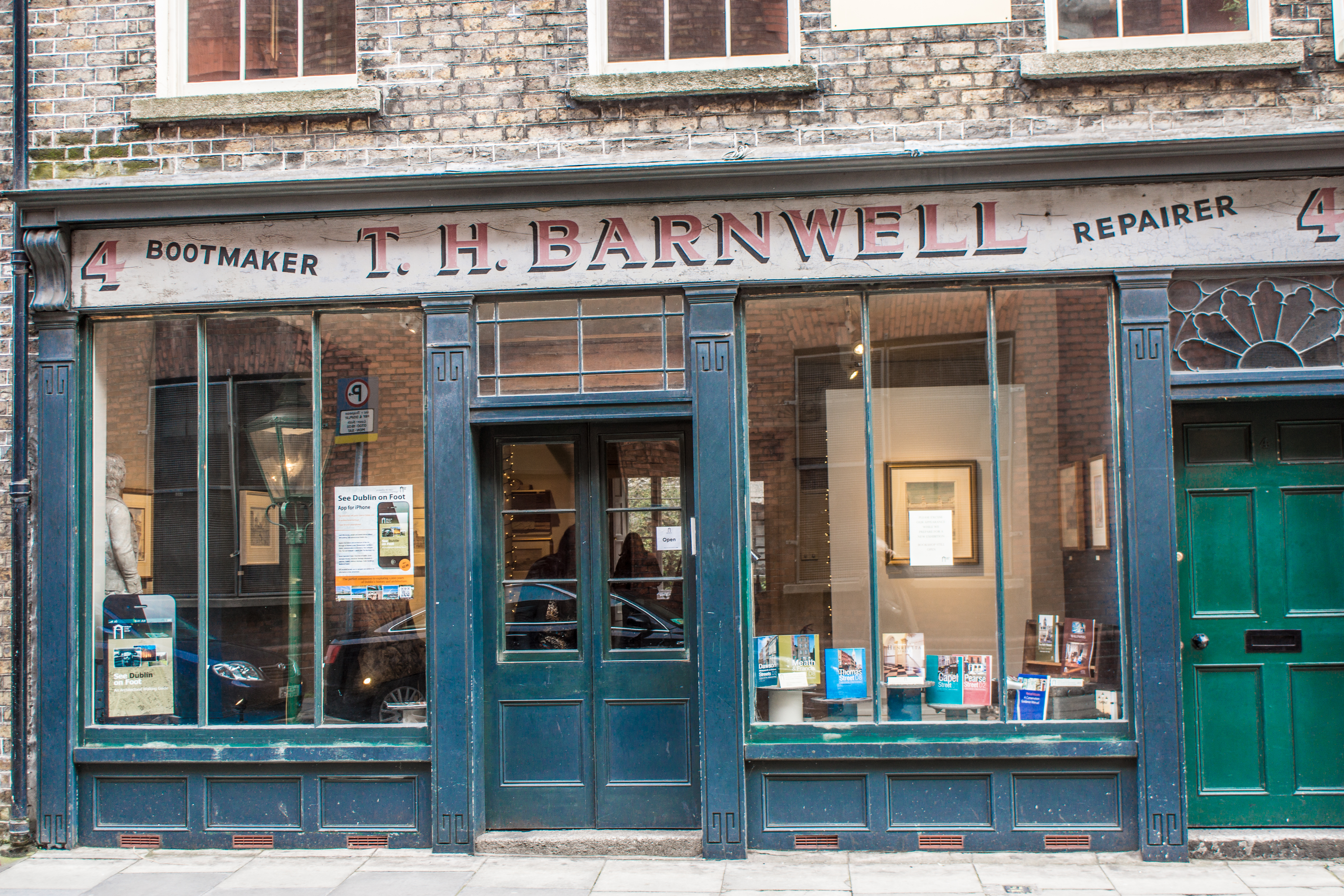
- 4 Castle Street, Dublin 2 - post-restoration
- Formation: 1991
- Founder: Geraldine Walsh; Ian Lumley; Peter Pearson
- Type: Company Limited by Guarantee
- Purpose: Architectural conservation and education
- Headquarters: 18 Ormond Quay Upper; Dublin 7 D07 V027
- Products: Conservation books
- Chief Executive: Geraldine Walsh
- Chairman: James Kelly
- Director: Alexander Downes
- Key people: Graham Hickey (Conservation Director)
- Website: https://www.dublincivictrust.ie

The Dublin Civic Trust is an architectural conservation and educational organisation founded in 1991 that works to identify, record, preserve and publicise Dublin's architectural heritage. The trust also comments and assists to a lesser extent with other buildings outside of Dublin.

The trust regularly appears in national print media lobbying on conservation and architectural heritage issues as well as contributing annual budget submissions.

== History ==
An earlier Dublin Civic Group had been established by Kevin B. Nowlan and Deirdre Kelly in December 1966 with similar aims although the trust is not its direct successor. The organisation was never formally incorporated and did not have members or a constitution. Among some of its first projects were campaigning for the conservation of buildings and structures at Tailors' Hall, Hume Street, Wood Quay and the new Central Bank of Ireland building on Dame Street.

In 1992, the Dublin Civic Trust was incorporated and created in order to restore two houses on South Frederick Street in central Dublin which it was agreed would be donated to the organisation by New Ireland Assurance as part of a planning compliance condition on the construction of a new office building.

The trust has later gone on to restore and sell other buildings across central Dublin as part of a revolving fund model.

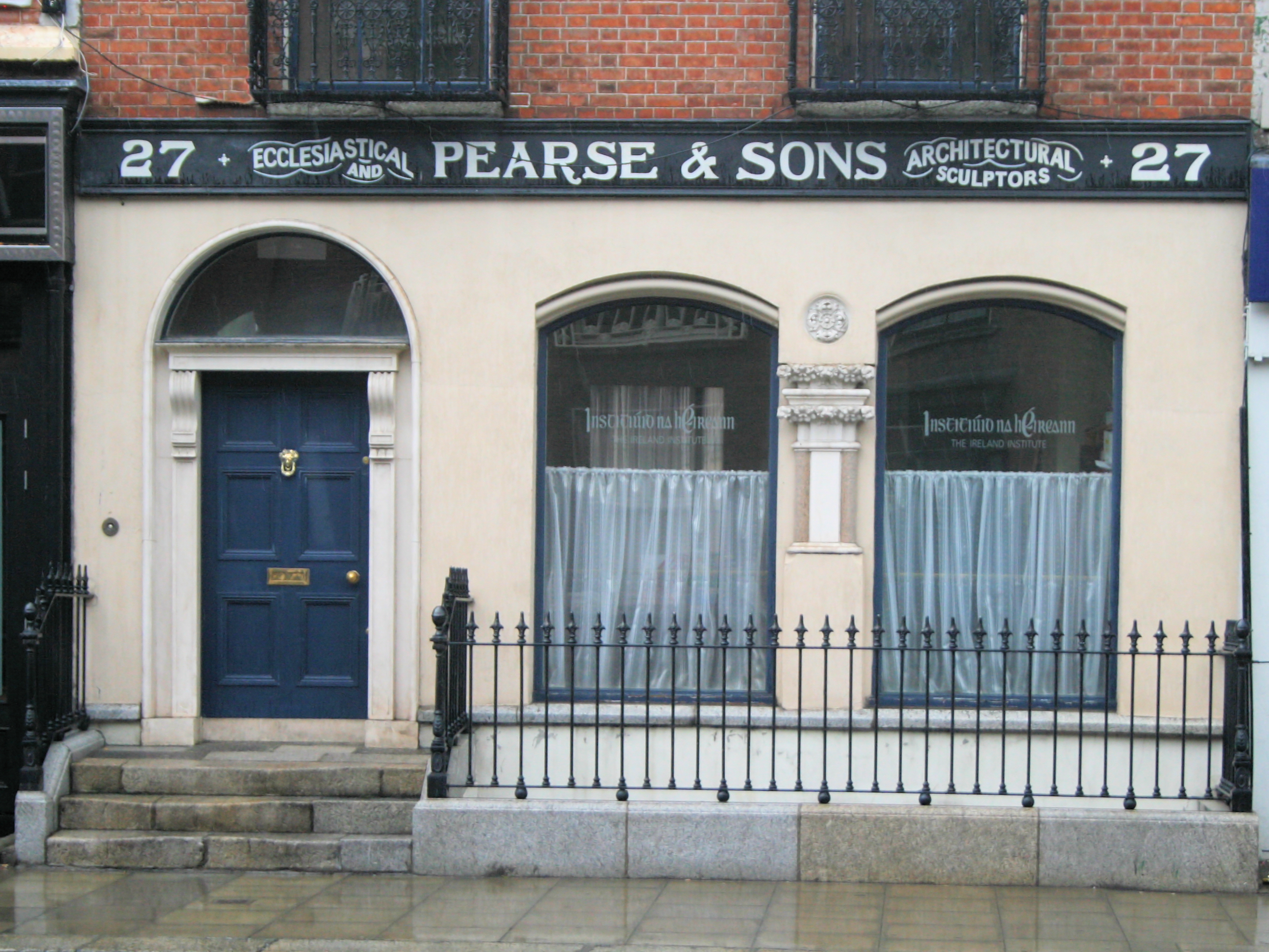
27 Pearse Street, Dublin 2

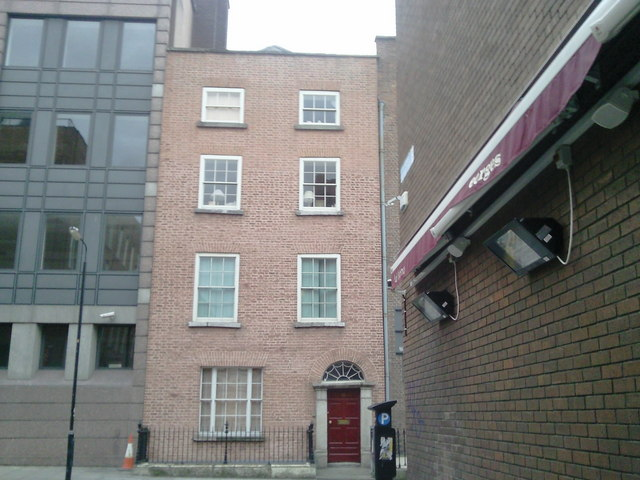
10 South Frederick Street, Dublin 2

=== List of completed building conservation projects ===
- 4 Castle Street, Dublin 2
- 18 Ormond Quay Upper, Inns Quay, Dublin 7 - winner of a 2021 Europa Nostra Award
- 21 Aungier Street, Dublin 2
- 10 and 11 South Frederick Street, Dublin 2
- 2 St Andrew's Street, Dublin 2
- 27 Pearse Street, Dublin 2
- 9 Merchant's Quay, Dublin 8

== See also ==
- Development and preservation in Dublin
- Conservation in the Republic of Ireland
