= Gormleys Gallery =

Irish art gallery

Gormleys (formerly Gormleys Fine Art) is an Irish commercial art gallery founded in 1990 by art dealer Oliver Gormley. It operates galleries in Dublin and Belfast and specialises in Irish and international contemporary art, including painting and sculpture.

The gallery has presented exhibitions featuring works by international artists including Andy Warhol, Keith Haring, Roy Lichtenstein, Banksy, Damien Hirst and Salvador Dalí.

== History ==
Gormleys was founded in 1990 by Oliver Gormley. The business developed as a commercial art gallery specialising in Irish and international contemporary art and subsequently expanded its exhibition programme to include sculpture and international artists.

The gallery operates permanent locations in Dublin and Belfast. Its activities have also included large-scale exhibitions of sculpture at venues outside its permanent galleries.

== Dublin gallery ==
Gormleys operates a gallery on South Frederick Street in Dublin. The gallery presents Irish and international contemporary art, including painting and sculpture.

=== Sculpture garden ===
In 2022, Gormleys opened the Gormleys Secret Sculpture Garden at the rear of its Dublin gallery. RTÉ reported that the garden contained approximately 60 works, predominantly life-size bronze sculptures, with a combined value of more than €1 million.

Works by artists including Patrick O'Reilly, Giacinto Bosco, Salvador Dalí, Ian Pollock, Eamonn Ceannt and John Behan were included in the garden.

== Belfast gallery ==
Gormleys operates a gallery on Lisburn Road in Belfast. The Belfast gallery presents Irish and international contemporary art, including painting and sculpture.

The Belfast gallery has also been associated with Gormleys' outdoor sculpture exhibitions at the Culloden Estate and Spa in County Down.

== Art + Soul ==
Art + Soul is a series of large-scale art and sculpture exhibitions organised by Gormleys at venues in Ireland and Northern Ireland. The exhibitions combine indoor displays with outdoor presentations of large-scale sculpture.

In 2021, Art + Soul was held at the Culloden Estate and Spa near Belfast. The exhibition featured 125 sculptures and works by artists including Andy Warhol, Banksy, Salvador Dalí, Damien Hirst, Pablo Picasso and Roy Lichtenstein, as well as works by Irish sculptors.

The Irish Independent described the 2021 exhibition as Ireland's largest-ever sculpture exhibition and as the biggest combined outdoor and indoor event of its kind in Ireland at the time.

In 2023, Art + Soul was held at Castlemartyr Resort in County Cork. The exhibition featured more than 200 works, including more than 80 outdoor sculptures and installations, with a reported combined value of more than €7 million.

In 2024, the Castlemartyr exhibition included more than 300 works and approximately 90 large sculptures and installations. Among the works exhibited was Salvador Dalí's Dance of Time II, a bronze sculpture weighing 405 kilograms and reported to be valued at €1.1 million.

== Pop art exhibitions ==
Gormleys has presented exhibitions focusing on Pop Art, including works by Andy Warhol, Roy Lichtenstein, Keith Haring and Robert Indiana.

In 2021, Gormleys presented an exhibition in Dublin bringing together works by Andy Warhol and Keith Haring. The exhibition included more than 20 works, including Warhol portraits of Marilyn Monroe, Mick Jagger and Chairman Mao and works from Haring's Pop Shop series.

The works subsequently formed part of an exhibition in Belfast at the Culloden Estate and Spa.

In 2023, Gormleys presented Pop Art Pioneers at its Dublin gallery. The exhibition featured works by Andy Warhol, Roy Lichtenstein, Keith Haring and Robert Indiana.

The exhibition included works by Warhol, Lichtenstein, Haring and Indiana, and was described by the Irish Independent as Ireland's largest exhibition of Pop Art at the time.

Gormleys had previously presented a 2017 exhibition featuring contemporary international editions by artists including Andy Warhol, Banksy, Damien Hirst, Keith Haring, Jeff Koons, Robert Indiana and Jean-Michel Basquiat.
