= Drimnagh Castle =

Moated Norman castle in Dublin, Ireland

- Caisleán Dhroimeanaigh
- Drimnagh Castle c.1820
- Interactive map of the Drimnagh Castle area

General information
- Location: Dublin, Ireland
- Coordinates: 53°19′30″N 6°19′58″W

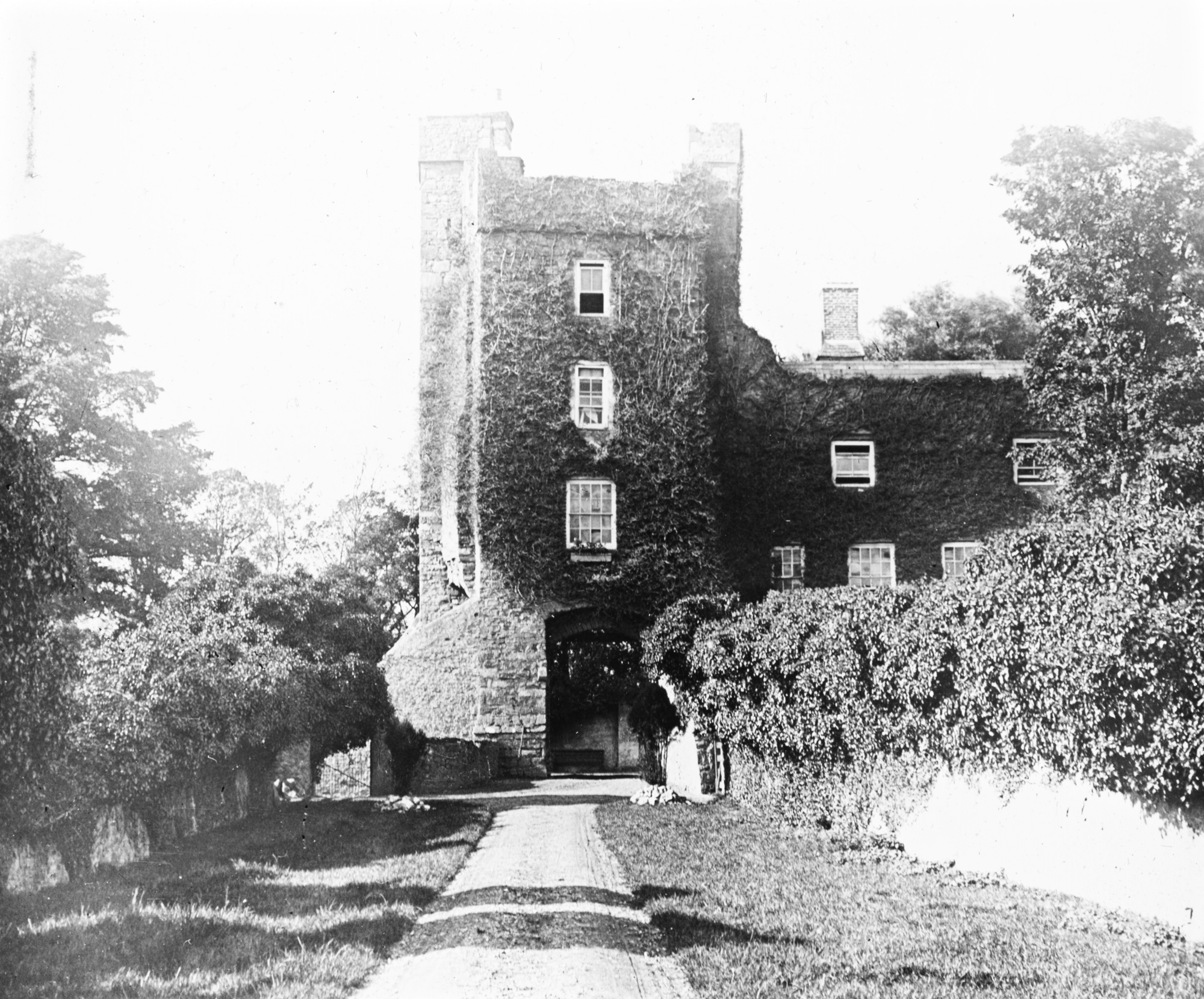
Drimnagh Castle circa 1900

Drimnagh Castle (Irish: Caisleán Dhroimeanaigh) is a Norman castle located in Drimnagh, a suburb of Dublin, Ireland. It is the only remaining castle in Ireland with a flooded moat around it; this moat is fed by a tributary of a local river, the Camac. Drimnagh Castle Secondary School is located next to the castle.

== History ==
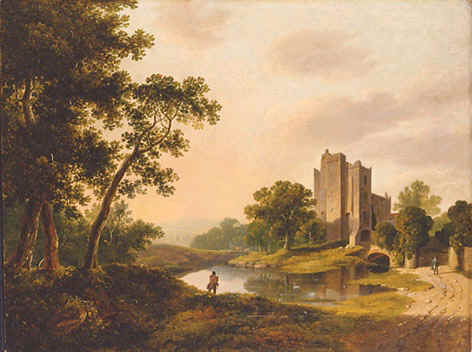
Painting of Drimnagh Castle by James Arthur O'Connor, 1821

The earliest recorded owner of Drimnagh Castle was Sir Hugh de Bernival, whose name is recorded in state papers relating to Ireland in 1216. His family, owners of Drimnagh Castle for centuries, were later known as Barnewell, sometimes Barnewall.

While the Barnewall family first built a fortification here in the mid-13th century, the main remaining structures of the castle date to the early 15th century. The buildings within the moat consist of a 15th-century great hall with an attached 16th or 17th-century tower. There is also a large early-20th-century stone building on the site which was at times used as a stable, a ballroom, and a coach house.

By the mid-19th century, the castle was owned by the then Marquess of Lansdowne, with Samuel Lewis's Topographical Dictionary of Ireland (printed 1837) stating that it was an "irregular pile", the "property of the Marquess of Lansdowne [..] occupied by Mr. E. Cavanagh".

In the very early 20th century, the castle and its lands were bought by Joseph Hatch (born 1851), a dairy man, of 6 Lower Leeson Street. Joseph Hatch was a member of Dublin City Council, representing Fitzwilliam Ward, from 1895 to 1907. He bought the castle in the early 1900s to provide grazing land for his cattle. He restored the castle, which became a summer home for his family and a location for the celebration of the silver wedding anniversary of Joseph Hatch and his wife, Mary Connell, as well as the marriage of their eldest daughter, Mary, in 1910.

Upon his death in April 1918, ownership of the castle passed to their eldest son, Joseph Aloysius (born 1882), known as Louis. Together with his brother Hugh, Louis managed the dairy farm and the dairy shop in Lower Leeson Street. Louis (who never married) died in December 1951. (Hugh, who did not marry until the age of 60 in 1944, died in 1950).

Occupied by the Hatch family until the mid-1950s, Drimnagh Castle was left by Louis Hatch to Dr. P. Dunne, Bishop of Nara, who sold it (reportedly for a nominal sum) to the Christian Brothers to build the school that now stands adjacent. The Christian Brothers lived and ran a school there until 1956, when they moved to their new schools and monastery close by.

In 1978, the local An Caisleán Gaelic Athletic Association club (now St James Gaels GAA club), took possession of the castle's coach-house and renovated it to give them a clubhouse, hall, kitchen and changing rooms with adjoining showers.

By the mid-1980s the castle was a ruin with fallen roofs, missing windows and partly collapsed masonry. In 1986 Peter Pearson, an artist working with An Taisce, the national trust for Ireland, set up a local committee and got FÁS, the state training authority, involved in a conservation and restoration programme. All work was carried out by hand; the construction of a 15th-century style medieval oak roof over the great hall, mullioned stone windows, lime mortars for building stone and plastering and wood carving in oak. A formal medieval–style garden was also created.

Drimnagh Castle re-opened to the public in 1991, with additional restoration work continuing through the 1990s.

As of 2019, the castle provides tours to the public and can be hired as a venue for weddings and other events. Dry stone walling courses are also run there.

== Film location ==
A number of movies and TV productions have been filmed at Drimnagh Castle, including The Abduction Club (2002), Ella Enchanted (2004) and The Tudors (2007).
