= Village (magazine) =

Current affairs magazine in Ireland

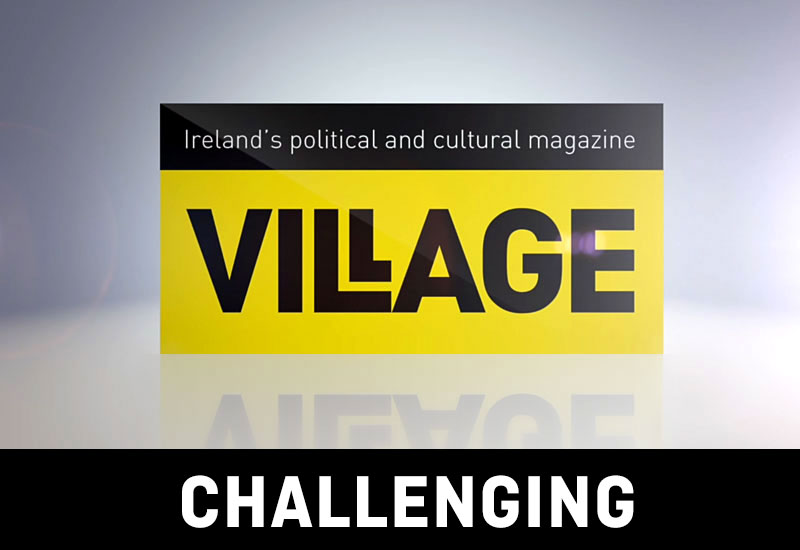
- Type: newsmagazine
- Format: Magazine
- Owner: Ormond Quay Publishing Ltd.
- Founder: Vincent Browne
- Editor: Michael Smith
- Founded: 2004
- Political alignment: Left-wing
- Headquarters: 6 Ormond Quay Upper; Dublin 7 Ireland
- Website: https://www.villagemagazine.ie/

Village is an Irish current affairs and cultural magazine. Launched in October 2004 and originally published weekly, it publishes investigative reporting and describes itself as being "driven by a clearly-stated political agenda and focuses on politics not personalities". It was founded, and edited by Vincent Browne. In November 2008, it was relaunched under new editor Michael Smith, a former investor in the magazine. The magazine prints ten issues per year and maintains an online presence.

Village is left-wing, with a stated aim to challenge "the endemically complacent and others by the acute promotion of equality, sustainability and accountability." Journalists who have contributed include Sara Burke, Frank Connolly, John Waters, Justine McCarthy, Gemma O'Doherty, Mary Regan, Naomi Wolf, Conor Brady, Maev-Ann Wren and Harry Browne. Other contributors include Niall Crowley, Ken Early, Constantin Gurdgiev, Germaine Greer, Enda Kenny, Conor Lenihan, and John Gormley.

== Controversies and significant stories ==
The magazine was sued by anti-Lisbon Treaty campaigner Declan Ganley in 2008 but proceedings were settled.

In 2010 Village received legal correspondence from Lord Mayor of Dublin, Oisin Quinn, over allegations he should not have voted on high-rise issues in the city, as he had a stake in property that might benefit from changes. In the end, Smith made a successful complaint to the Standards in Public Office Commission (SIPO) which found in 2011 that there had been a minor breach.

In 2012 Village claimed that if the Director of Public Prosecutions did not pursue named bankers and allegedly corrupt individuals for corruption and other named offences it would initiate private prosecutions itself, but did not do so. It claimed that it was to pursue an initiative with Jonathan Sugarman, a former liquidity manager, against Unicredit Bank for breaches of regulations, but could not as his career had collapsed and he could not pursue his commitment.

In 2014 Village exclusively published the redacted Ansbacher dossier, alleging a long-standing cover-up of ownership of offshore bank accounts by senior public figures and politicians.

In 2015, uniquely among Irish-owned print publications, Village printed allegations made by Catherine Murphy TD about interest rates paid by Ireland's richest man, Denis O'Brien, to the state-owned Irish Bank Resolution Corporation.

In 2016 former Donegal County Council county manager, Michael McLoone, initiated High Court proceedings against Village for defamation after it printed what it claimed was an affidavit opened in court detailing multiple allegations made about planning in County Donegal by former senior county planner, Gerard Convie.

In March 2017, Village published a cover depicting US President Donald Trump in crosshairs alongside the headline "Why Not", linked to an editorial explaining why it would be wrong to kill Trump. The headline garnered international coverage, especially from right-wing outlets, including Fox News Insider.

In late 2017 following the publication of multiple accounts from alleged victims of bullying and sexual harassment by Michael Colgan, then director of the Gate Theatre, including those of seven former employees who spoke to The Irish Times, Village published an editorial on the matter. Colgan initiated a defamation action in the High Court in January 2018, claiming the editorial associated him with Hollywood producer Harvey Weinstein and actor Kevin Spacey, both of whom have been accused of sexual assault, and in Weinstein's case, rape. "Your outrageous article seeks to associate our client with and make him the subject of the serious criminal allegations that have been published in the media regarding Harvey Weinstein, Kevin Spacey and others with the clear defamatory inference that our client has been guilty of serious sexual crimes, including rape," Colgan's solicitor, Paul Tweed, told the publication in a letter sent on 16 November 2017, six days after the article appeared. In October 2018, the magazine claimed that proceedings had not been served on the magazine or its editor, and that as of November 2019 there was no sign the action was being advanced in the courts.

In August 2019, far-right activist and former contributor to the magazine Gemma O'Doherty initiated legal action against Village.

In October 2020, Village published an article alleging that Tánaiste Leo Varadkar had leaked confidential documents, including a draft contract between the Health Service Executive and general practitioners. There was a photo of the cover of the leaked document, and it alleged the handwriting visible was Varadkar's. It claimed the leaks may be a breach of the Criminal Justice (Corruption Offences) Act 2018, the Official Secrets Act 1963, and the Dáil members' Code of Conduct 2002. The hashtags #LeoGate and #LeoTheLeak began trending in the wake of the circulation of the story on social media.

On 17 July 2021, Village published the name of "Soldier F", the British paratrooper accused by the Saville Inquiry of shooting multiple unarmed civilians during Bloody Sunday. In May 2022, Village named another participant, "Soldier G", as former Private Ronald Cook. The article claims Cook was killed by a sniper, in a conflict in South Africa, in 1986.
