= Mamie Cadden =

Irish midwife, backstreet abortionist, and convicted murderer (1891–1959)

Mary Anne "Mamie" Cadden
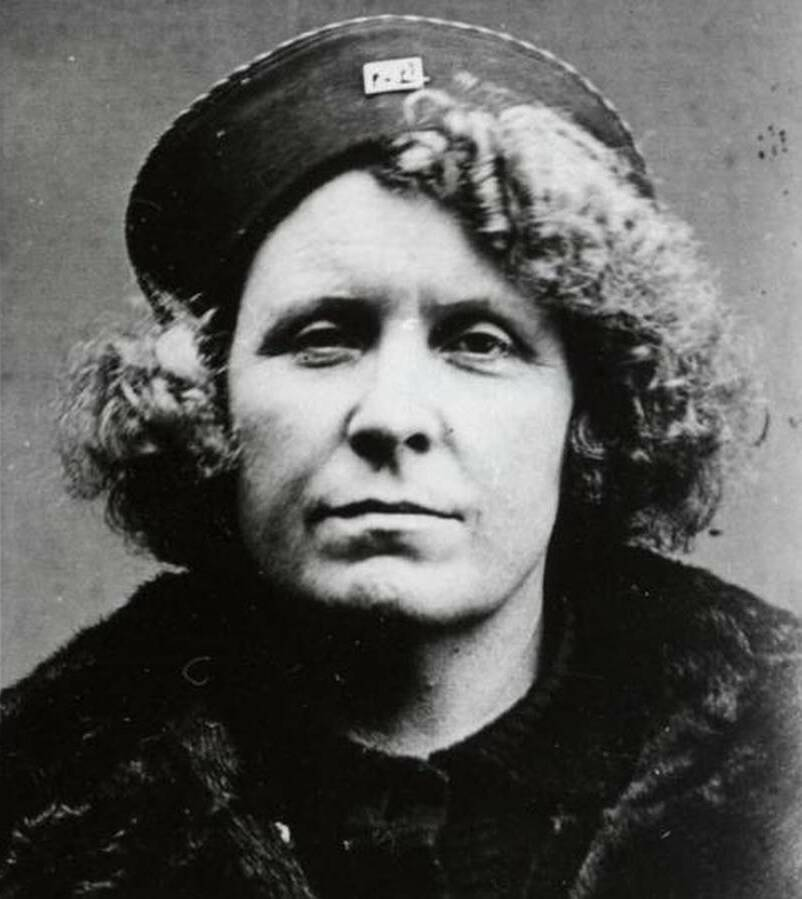
- Mugshot of Cadden, c. 1939
- Born: Mary Anne Caden; 27 November 1891; Scranton, Pennsylvania, US
- Died: 20 April 1959 (aged 67); Dublin, Ireland
- Known for: Providing illegal abortions; Providing medical care; Midwifery
- Criminal charges: 1939: Child abandonment; 1945: An attempt to procure a miscarriage; 1956: Murder
- Penalty: 1939: 1 year imprisonment; 1945: 5 years imprisonment; 1956: Death by hanging (Commuted to Life imprisonment)

Details
- Imprisoned at: Mountjoy Prison; Dundrum criminal lunatic asylum

Mary Anne "Mamie" Cadden (27 October 1891 – 20 April 1959) was an American-born Irish midwife, backstreet abortionist, and convicted murderer. She was born 27 October 1891 in Scranton, Pennsylvania, to Irish parents Patrick and Mary Cadden. In 1895, Cadden and her family returned to Lahardane in County Mayo, Ireland, where she completed years of schooling. Once she obtained her spot on the list of licensed midwives in Dublin, she opened a series of maternity nursing homes to aid women with health issues and to perform illegal abortions. After a series of criminal convictions, Cadden lost her status as a licensed midwife. In 1956, Cadden was charged and convicted for the murder of 33-year-old Helen O'Reilly, a patient who died during an operation. She was sentenced to death, albeit her sentence was quickly commuted to life in prison since O'Reilly's death was unintentional. After a year at Mountjoy prison, she was declared insane and moved to the criminal lunatic asylum Dundrum, where she died of a heart attack on 20 April 1959. Although many people committed backstreet abortions during the period of Cadden's life, Cadden was the only person in Ireland to be sentenced to death for a maternal death occurring as a result of an abortion. As one of the most discussed Irish abortionists of her era, some members of the Irish public associated the name "Nurse Cadden" with "evil".

== Background ==
=== Childhood ===
Mamie Cadden was born Mary Anne Caden on 27 October 1891 in Scranton, Pennsylvania, to Patrick and Mary Caden, and was the eldest of seven children, five of whom survived infancy. Patrick and Mary Cadden had met in America, where Patrick worked as a miner. In 1895, upon the death of her paternal grandfather, Mamie's father inherited his father's farm and so Cadden and her family returned to Lahardane, County Mayo. Her parents settled down, purchased a small family farm, and opened a grocery store on their land. There, her parents expanded the family and Mamie became the eldest of seven siblings and her father's favorite child. Cadden spent much of her early life on this farm, and continued to live there until she was 33 years old.

=== Education ===
While living in Mayo, Cadden and her siblings attended school from a young age. She attended Lahardane National School in Mayo until the age of fifteen, and was literate and spoke good Irish and English. After completing school, Cadden worked on her family's farm. Once many years had passed, Mamie realized she did not want to spend the rest of her life on the farm with her next youngest brother. She had always taken an interest in midwifery, and in 1925, shortly after her sister Theresa's death, Cadden sold her portion of her land to her father to finance her midwifery certification course. She moved to Dublin to train as a midwife at the National Maternity Hospital, Dublin, and completed a six-month course, qualifying as a midwife on 10 December 1926. While there, she changed the spelling of her name 'Caden' to 'Cadden' upon her move. In 1931 she purchased a property in Rathmines and ran it as her own maternity nursing home. This was a common practice among midwives at the time, the profession then being one that operated independently of nursing and medicine.

== Legal context ==
During the time Mamie Cadden was entering the medical field in Ireland, the medical industry was dominated by Irish men. The Catholic Church and Irish political state were heavily intertwined. The Catholic Church wanted to ensure that medicine in Ireland operated under the ethos of the Church. This Catholic ethos helped ensure that in the Irish health care system things like contraceptives were relatively inaccessible. In 1929, the Censorship of Publications Act banned the sale of literature that advocated or educated on the use of birth control or contraceptives. While the Act did not ban the access or sale of birth control, it did, however, ban the access to information about contraceptives. Birth control was officially prohibited in Ireland in 1935 until 1979, under the Criminal Law Amendment Act. Many believed that birth control would tarnish the work in prenatal clinics and mother and baby entities. For many years, Catholic principles and Catholic professionals remained central to developments in the Irish medical field. As a result, many women resorted to illegal abortions and contraceptives. These illegal actions were facilitated by people like Mamie Cadden.

== Midwife and abortionist ==
=== Early career ===
After Cadden completed her training at the National Maternity Hospital, Dublin, she began working as a midwife. She first worked in the Alverno maternity nursing home on Portland Row in Dublin from 1927 to 1929. In 1929, she opened her own maternity nursing home in the suburb of Ranelagh which operated until 1931. Cadden's practice became quite large, and her business outgrew her facilities. In 1931, she moved her business to Rathmines and became the owner of one of Dublin's most extensive nursing homes. Based at 4 Ormonde Terrance, she later changed the name to St. Maelruin. At St Maelruin, Cadden gave help relating to female health issues such as pregnancies, illegal abortions, and foster care operations for unwanted children. Her cousin, Molly O'Grady, helped as her maid and accomplice. Cadden also accepted fees for placing children into adoption. She also operated a fostering service, which placed children with families who received payment for caring for the child. She procured abortions – both medical (using preparations such as ergot) and surgical (by injecting a solution). The intentional killing of an unborn child was a criminal act in Ireland at that time and remained illegal until 2018.

As there was a large demand for her services, Cadden did not feel the need to advertise her work; and such an advertisement would have been illegal. "Nurse Cadden's" activities were an open secret and many women reportedly wanted to use her services. Her business was successful, and she had an active social life in which she frequented dances, dined and drank in Dublin's top hotels, and drove a red open-top 1932 MG sports car.

In 1939, Cadden was sentenced to a year's hard labour in Mountjoy Prison for abandoning and exposing a new-born baby on the side of the road in County Meath.

=== Working after her first conviction ===
After her first conviction for child abandonment in 1939, Cadden was removed from the roll of registered midwives and was banned from aiding women in childbirth. When she was in prison, Cadden was forced to sell St Maelruin as she faced a financial crisis from the legal stresses of her arrest. The home was sold in May 1939. During this time there was a Garda investigation of her property and the remains of an aborted fetus were found, indicative of illegal abortion activity. The Gardai was able to trace the mother, who admitted consulting Cadden following a failed attempt at self-abortion. Although this discovery did not lead to charges being pressed against Cadden, they permanently rose Gardai's awareness of Cadden.

Once out of prison, Cadden resumed her illegal activities in rented premises despite having been removed as a registered midwife. She also provided miscellaneous medical treatments such as supposed cures for constipation and dandruff, and marketed herself as 'Nurse Cadden'. She fell foul of the law again in 1945 when a pregnant girl who went to Cadden for an abortion denounced her, after being declared septic. The girl claimed that Cadden had inserted the laminaria tents which were found in her cervix. Cadden was tried under the Offences against the Person Act 1861. Despite denying the charges, she was convicted of procuring an abortion and was sentenced to penal servitude in Mountjoy Prison for five years.

Having served her full term she resumed her former trade on her release, this time in Hume Street, near Dublin's fashionable St Stephen's Green. Operating out of a one-roomed flat, she was able to continue her illegal business and was still well known enough in Dublin not to need advertising. One of her clients died from an air embolism in the heart in 1951. Cadden left the woman's body outside on the street. Even this did not put an end to her activities as there was not sufficient evidence to connect her. Five years later, one of her patients, Helen O'Reilly, also died of an air embolism during a procedure to abort a pregnancy in the fifth month. When her body was found on the pavement in Hume Street, Cadden was arrested and tried for murder. She was sentenced to death by hanging in 1956, but this was commuted to life imprisonment after public appeals for clemency and due to the unintentional nature of Helen O'Reilly's death. (The last hanging in the Republic of Ireland took place in 1954, while the last woman to be hanged was Annie Walsh in 1925.) Cadden started serving her term in Mountjoy Prison, but was declared insane and moved to the Criminal Lunatic asylum in Dundrum, Dublin, where she died of a heart attack on 20 April 1959.

== Criminal record ==
- 1939: Cadden was sentenced to a year in prison for child abandonment.
- 1945: Cadden was sentenced to 5 years in prison for an attempt to procure a miscarriage.
- 1956: Cadden was sentenced to death by hanging for the murder of Helen O'Reilly. Helen O'Reilly died as a result of an air embolism. She was 5 months pregnant, and the death occurred during an abortion. Tools to perform the illegal operation were found in Cadden's flat on Hume Street. Police found a Higginson syringe, two specula – instruments used to dilate the birth canal – and a surgical clamp. Over 80 witnesses were called to give evidence in the trial, which lasted about a week.

== Cultural depictions ==
In 1994, she was the subject of two episodes of RTÉ television documentaries, one in the series entitled Thou Shalt not Kill, which examined and dramatised famous Irish murder cases under the title "The body in Hume Street", and on Monday 18 November 2007, an episode of the RTÉ television documentary series Scannal featured the case under the title "Scannal: Nurse Mamie Cadden", which framed her as a complex woman who had a life that reflected the difficulties of Ireland's restriction on reproductive rights. The 2016 play "Our Lady of Last Resort" by Sorcha Hegarty paints Cadden as a ghost in the Shelbourne hotel and as a criminal figure, but also as someone whose life and work exposed the contradictions and failures of Irish reproductive laws. The story places her in the Shelbourne Hotel, a well-known landmark in Dublin, and highlights the contrast between the respectable appearance of Irish society and its hidden truths.
