= Michael Smith (Irish journalist) =

Irish journalist

Michael Smith (born 25 October 1965) had the idea for the reward that led to Ireland's Planning Tribunal (1997–2012), was chairman of An Taisce, Ireland's National Trust and largest campaigning environmental NGO (1999–2003), and an activist opposing bad planning and environmental degradation; and is now editor of leftist magazine, Village.

== Early life ==
Michael Smith was born in Dublin in 1965, grew up in Shanganagh Vale, Loughlinstown in South County Dublin, and went to school in the Ursuline Convent in nearby Cabinteely and to St Conleth's College and Gonzaga College. He obtained a Bachelor of Civil Law Degree and a Diploma in European Law from University College Dublin and a degree of Barrister-at-Law from King's Inns (1989).

== Monarch Properties ==
In 1989 Monarch Properties, one of Ireland’s most successful developers which had developed the Tallaght Town Centre shopping centre, bought 240 acres of attractive hilly fields opposite where Smith grew up, at Cherrywood. A group styling itself the Campaign for Honesty in Politics (CHIP), led by Smith, published a leaflet in 1991 headed 'politicians on the fiddle: vote them out’ detailing what it claimed was bad or improper practice by councillors in the County Council.

Smith and others, primarily from his former neighbourhood in Loughinstown, mounted a two-year campaign to stop the development of the Cherrywood site which was already zoned for low-density housing. It was clear that if Monarch got the rezoning a lot of land in the area would be developed as the Shanganagh sewer had recently been installed and the M50 and former Harcourt St railway skirted the site.

Another group led by Smith called the Shanganagh Protection Committee campaigned from 1992 and published leaflets outlining how councillors were changing their minds on rezonings, and asking people to call them about it. Monarch Properties spent £800,000 on public relations for the rezoning primarily through a company fronted by sports presenter Bill O'Herlihy, including on a roadshow, television ads and donations to local sports club. But in 1992, an upzoning was actually undone by councillors, under pressure from residents. Monarch replaced O'Herlihy with former government Press Secretary Frank Dunlop who made payments, some of which were found to be corrupt, to councillors and to Taoiseach Albert Reynolds and opposition leader, John Bruton, The rezoning of nearly all of Monarch lands, and some others went through at the last minute at four houses per acre in 1993 after a number of councillors changed their minds from the previous year.

Smith, who claimed that Phil Monahan, boss of Monarch had predicted the change and boasted to him that he was paying councillors, says he was enraged and had the idea of offering a reward for planning corruption.

Smith and a friend of his, barrister Colm MacEochaidh, offered £10,000 for "information leading to the conviction on indictment of persons for rezoning corruption". None of the 'progressive' Dublin solicitors they approached would front the project so they employed Newry-based solicitor Kevin Neary, who appeared in the media explaining the accumulating evidence that was being submitted to him by members of the public.

Smith and MacEochaidh fed information that came from informants to journalists, notably Frank Connolly of the Sunday Business Post, who printed much of it. As a result of information that came from James Gogarty, a disgruntled former employee of Joseph Murphy Structural Engineers, the Minister for Foreign Affairs, Ray Burke resigned and was subsequently jailed for tax offences. A Planning Tribunal was established in 1997 and finally reported after costing up to €300m in 2012. Allegations aired in the process led to the resignation of the Taoiseach, Bertie Ahern.

== Work with An Taisce ==
Smith became chair of An Taisce's Dublin City Association in 1994 and was unpaid chair and CEO of the organisation nationally from 1999-2003. The Guardian newspaper once described him as the most dangerous man in Ireland. He was the lead author for An Taisce on reports about Temple Bar, the Quays, Dublin pubs, listed buildings, Grafton St, High-Rise and One-Off Housing. He sought to restyle An Taisce as a community-focused organisation campaigning to improve quality of life. He signed up to 2000 letters of observation on controversial applications in that time, including unsuccessful appeals of peat-burning power stations, an objection to the demolition of the childhood home of James Joyce and a successful appeal of a holiday home for President Mary McAleese and her husband, Martin, in Roscommon

He successfully campaigned to save the birthplace of Edward Carson, father of Irish Unionism, on Harcourt St in Dublin City Centre saved from demolition. He campaigned against unplanned high-rise in Dublin’s inner city including at George’s Quay and Spencer Dock though he supported higher densities. In 1997 he formed a company called Lancefort allegedly to oppose bad development. It took a case to the High Court saying that the demolition of historic and listed buildings on Dublin’s College Green required an environmental impact statement. The case was aired 47 times in the High Court but was lost in the Supreme Court. Lancefort also unsuccessfully appealed disgraced former Minister Michael Lowry's application for retention permission for a house at Holy Cross, Co Tipperary, which had been paid for by supermarket mogul, Ben Dunne. Around this time Ian Lumley found Progressive Democrat financial records in a skip outside the party's headquarters and Smith forwarded them to the Sunday Business Post. which printed them, generating a scandal.

Smith led campaigns for environmental taxation and against motorways including near Tara, out-of-town developments and especially one-off housing which generated much controversy.

In 1999 he and independent councillor Tony McEvoy from Kildare took a case challenging the implementation of the Strategic Planning Guidelines in Meath in the High Court. Although it was clear the Meath Development Plan was massively breaching the Guidelines, Quirke J held that the County Council's obligation to "have regard" to the Guidelines had not been breached.

== Campaigning ==
In 2006 Smith made a complaint about conflicts of interest in Docklands centring on then chairman of Anglo Irish Bank, Sean Fitzpatrick, who described the complaint as "corporate McCarthyism". The complaint was not upheld because the relationship between directors of a bank and customers of the bank who might benefit from decisions taken by a board such as that of the DDDA which included the directors was not held to be covered by the legislation and regulations.

In 2007 Smith fronted a general-election campaign promoting recognition of the importance of climate change through a company called Heat.

In 2008 he was to the fore in unsuccessfully opposing demolition of the Art Deco Clarence Hotel in Dublin's Temple Bar.

== Editor of Village magazine ==
In 2008 he took over Village magazine which had failed under well-known journalist, Vincent Browne. The current affairs magazine carries stories on politics, media, culture, international and the environment, is now published monthly with an ideology that focuses on equality of outcome, sustainability and transparency.

The magazine was sued by anti-Lisbon Treaty campaigner Declan Ganley in 2008 but proceedings were settled. In 2010 it received legal correspondence from then Lord Mayor of Dublin, Oisin Quinn, over allegations he should not have voted on high-rise issues in the city as he had a stake in property that might benefit from changes. In the end Smith made a successful complaint to the Standards in Public Office Commission (SIPO) which found in 2011 that there had been a minor breach. It was one of only three successful complaints about politicians that had been taken at that stage in SIPO's history. In 2012 Village claimed that if the DPP did not pursue named bankers and allegedly corrupt individuals for corruption and other named offences it would initiate private prosecutions itself. But it did not do so. It claimed that it was to pursue an initiative with Jonathan Sugarman former liquidity manager against Unicredit Bank for breaches of regulations but could not as his career had collapsed and he could not pursue his commitment. In 2014 Village uniquely published the redacted Ansbacher dossier, alleging a long-standing cover-up of ownership of offshore bank accounts by senior public figures and politicians.

In 2015 uniquely among Irish-owned print publications Village printed allegations made by Catherine Murphy TD about interest rates paid by Ireland's richest man, Denis O'Brien, to state-owned IBRC bank .

In October 2022 he started legal proceedings against Tánaiste Leo Varadkar, alleging Varadkar had made defamatory statements via The Sunday Times in August 2022.

== Personal life ==
Smith has restored several buildings in Ireland and France and currently retains business interests in France and in a restaurant on Ormond Quay. He has been an Eisenhower Fellow since 2001.

Smith renovated two dilapidated houses on Dublin’s Ormond Quay with business partner, Ian Lumley, heritage officer of An Taisce. He lives with his two daughters in one of them which is a registered national monument dating from 1686, which he restored, in part in a modern style. In August 2019 it was reported he had settled a year-long legal action against Monteco Holdings Ltd, which was developing the Ormond Hotel, next door.
