= Hume Street, Dublin =

Street in Dublin, Ireland

Hume Street
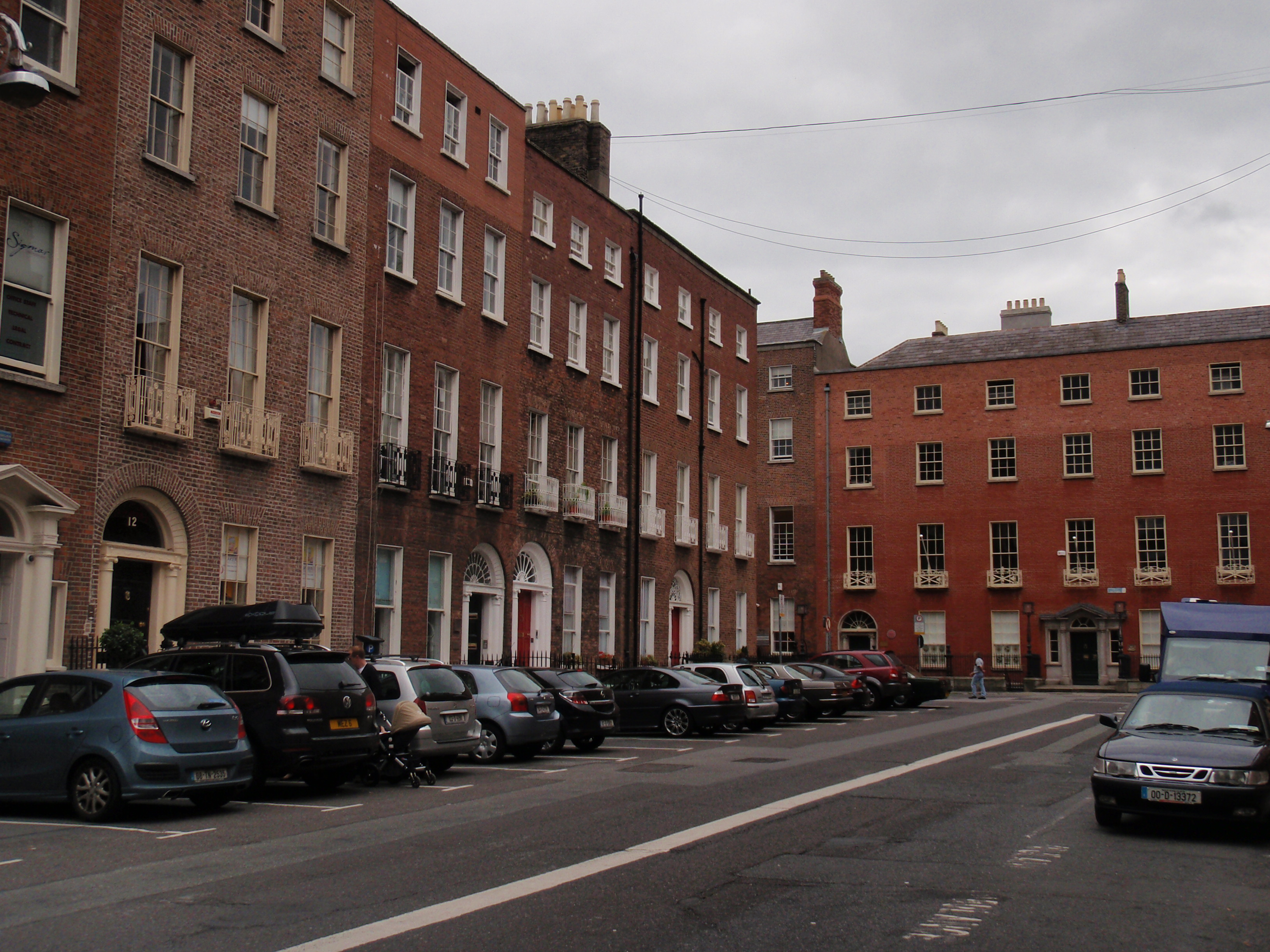

- Location within Central Dublin
- Native name: Sráid Hume (Irish)
- Namesake: Sir Gustavus Hume, 3rd Baronet and family
- Length: 106 m (348 ft)
- Width: 20 metres (66 ft)
- Location: Dublin, Ireland
- Postal code: D02
- Coordinates: 53°20′16″N 6°15′18″W
- west end: St Stephens Green East
- east end: Ely Place

Construction
- Commissioned: 1768

Other
- Known for: Georgian Dublin, Mamie Cadden, Richard Griffith

Hume Street (/ˈhjuːm/; Irish: Sráid Hume) is a street in central Dublin located between Ely Place and St. Stephen's Green. It is named after Sir Gustavus Hume, 3rd Baronet (c.1670–1731) and his family.

Most of the south side of the street is taken up by the former City of Dublin Skin and Cancer Hospital, which was located in this street for over 100 years, until 2006. It was moved to St. Vincent's Hospital in 2006.

The geologist Richard Griffith was born in no. 8.

== History ==
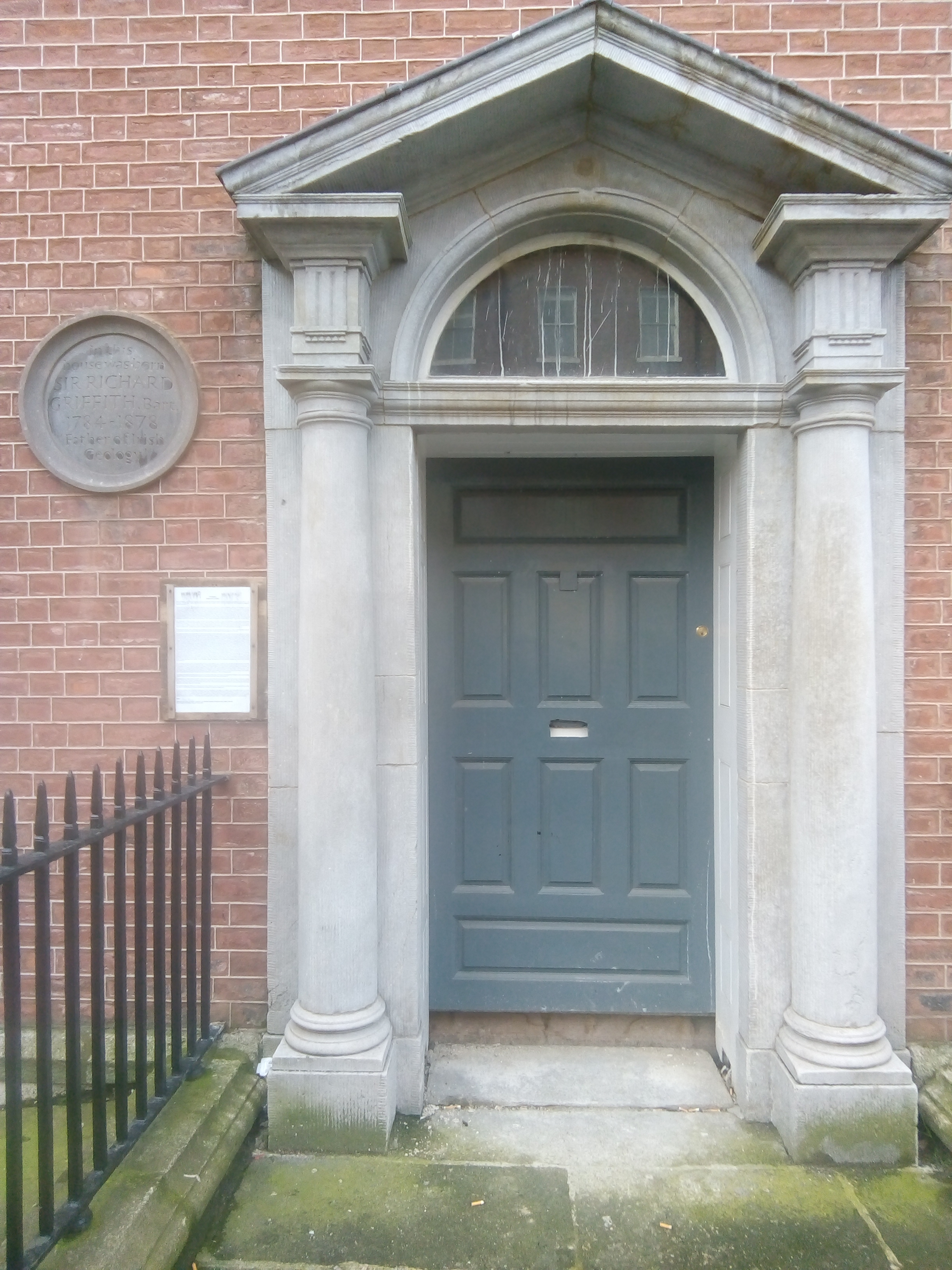
Door on 8 Hume Street, birthplace of the geologist Sir Richard Griffith, 1st Baronet.

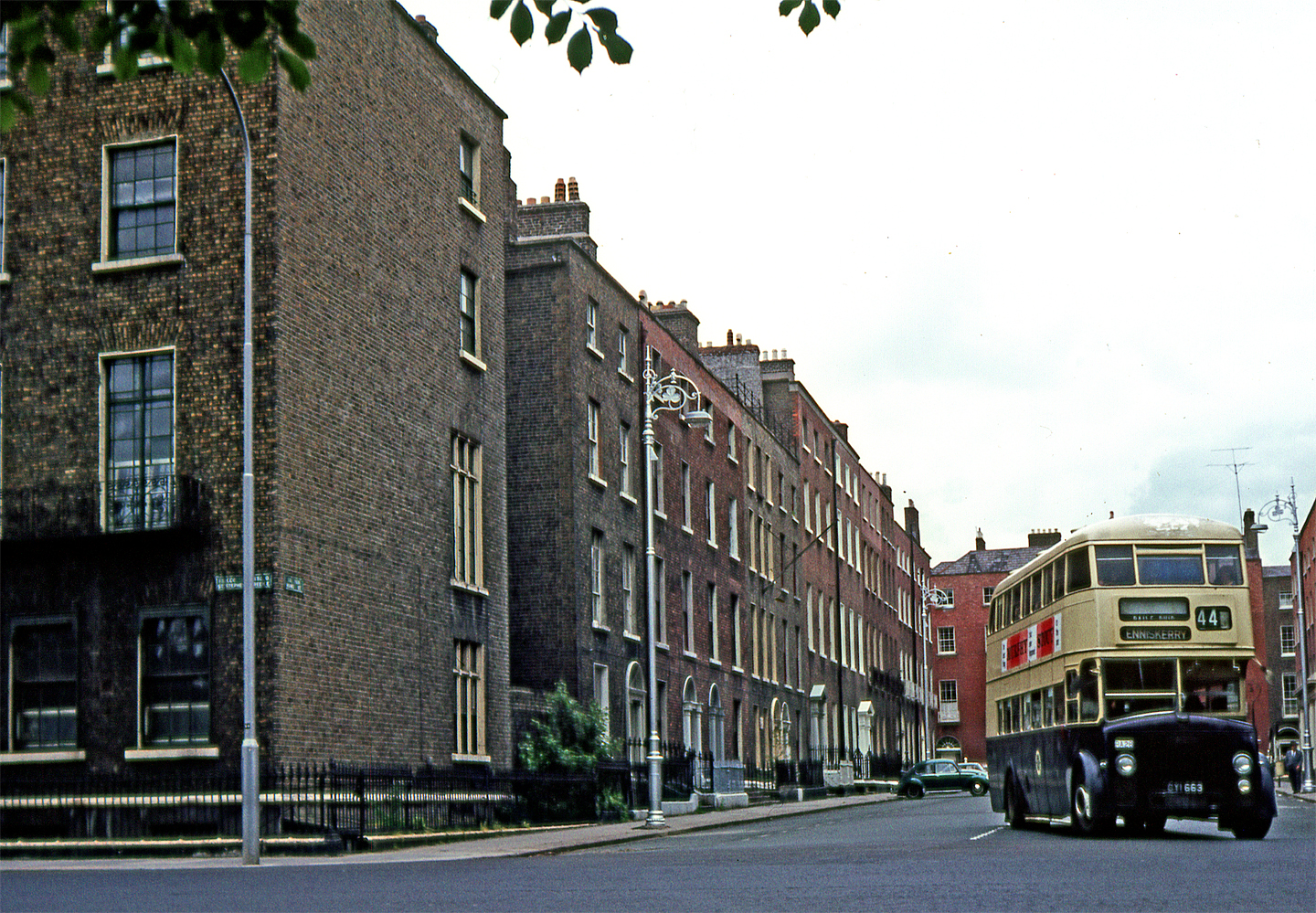
Hume Street in 1969

The street was laid out in 1768. Gustavus Hume built one of the corner houses demolished in 1969. Other developers included Timothy Turner, John Ensor, Nicholas Tench and John Meares.

In June 1969, one of the earliest battles to preserve Georgian Dublin took place at the corner of the street and St Stephen's Green. An attempt by property developer Green Property to demolish a number of Georgian houses hit the national headlines, and became a cause célèbre.

The Minister for Local Government, Kevin Boland, had overridden the decision of Dublin Corporation, and given permission for the demolition. The buildings were then occupied by students, in an effort to prevent their destruction. However, a crew of demolition men entered the buildings during the night and destroyed the roofs and interiors. That afternoon 1,000 protesters were joined by Garret FitzGerald, Senator Mary Bourke (later Mary Robinson), Deirdre Kelly, Noel Browne and Justin Keating and others to prevent the destruction. Though the original buildings were lost, the developer ended up building Georgian pastiche buildings on the site, but further destruction of the street was likely prevented.

== Backstreet abortion centre ==
In the 1950s an apartment in the street served as the workplace of backstreet abortionist Mamie Cadden. The death of one of her patients from an air embolism in the heart in 1951, whose body Cadden left outside on the street, did not put an end to her activities as there was not sufficient evidence to connect her to the death. Five years later one of her patients, Helen O'Reilly, died of an air embolism during a procedure to abort a fetus in the fifth month. When her body was found on the pavement in Hume Street, Cadden was arrested and tried for murder. She was sentenced to death by hanging in 1956, but this was commuted to life imprisonment after public appeals for clemency and due to the unintentional nature of Helen O'Reilly's death.

== See also ==
- Development and preservation in Dublin
- Georgian Dublin
