= Mendicity Institution =

Charity in Dublin, Ireland

- Formation: 1818
- Type: Charitable organisation
- Legal status: Non-profit
- Purpose: Housing, homelessnessand poverty alleviation
- Location: Usher's Island, Dublin
- Region served: Ireland
- Website: www.mendicity.org

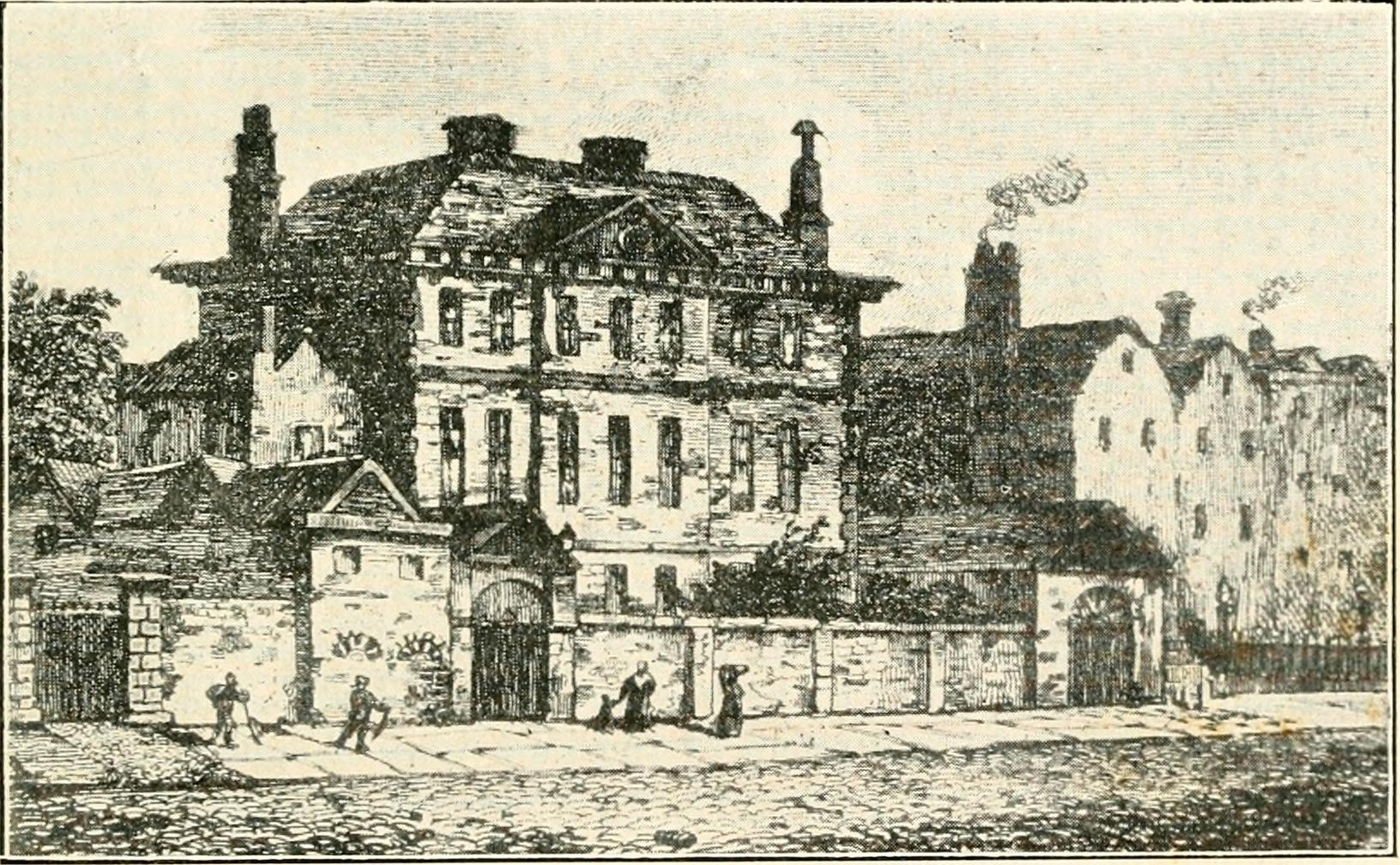
Moira House, Usher's Island, Dublin as it would have looked in 1752

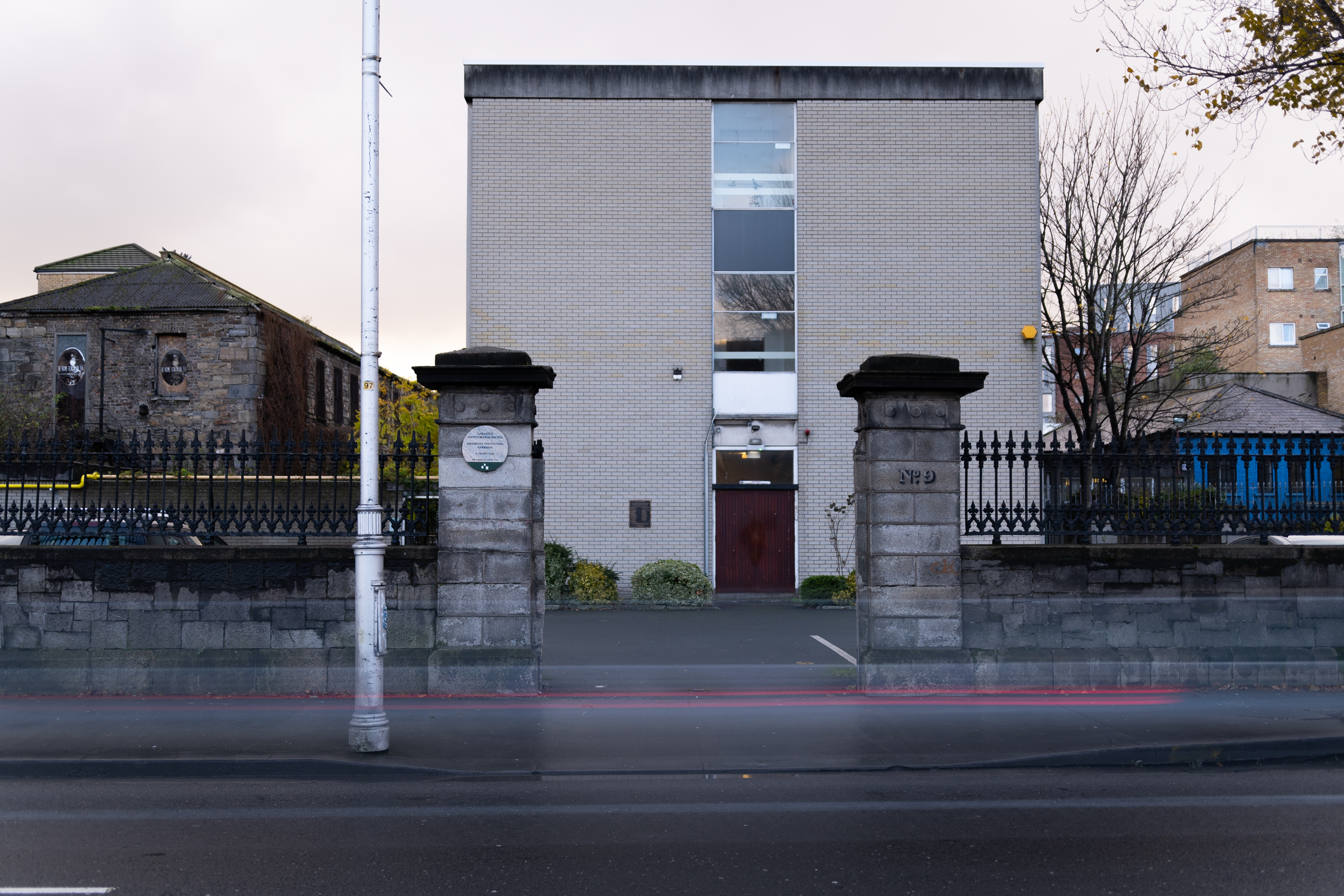
Still extant gates of the original Moira House.

The Mendicity Institution is a charity in Dublin, Ireland, which is also one of Dublin's oldest charities. It operates from its premises at Moira House, Island Street, to the south of Usher's Island, its former location and continues its charitable work, including providing meals and rooms to Dublin's needy.

The word 'mendicity' comes from 'mendicant', an archaic term for a beggar or needy person.

== History ==
=== Early years ===
Following a meeting of businesspeople in 1817, and drawing on work in other European cities, the Institution was established in 1818 as the Mendicity Association. Its aim was to provide food, clothing, education and lodging for the poor of Dublin, and it was one of many that were established in Dublin to relieve the poverty that pervaded the city at that time. There was no broad system of public welfare, nor, until some time later, any general policy on the part of the government to alleviate poverty. It was left to parishes (which in the poorer areas of the city had very little to spare), private individuals and institutions, such as the House of Industry to ease poverty through voluntary work. Prior to hosting the institution, Moira House had been the home of the Earl of Moira and was constructed for that purpose in 1752.

The early Mendicity Association had a committee of 60, including members of prominent families, which employed a supervisor and staff for secretarial and financial work, four teachers, a dispensing pharmacist and six other staff for the main premises, and two street-inspectors. It aimed to care for those normally resident within the city core, between the North and South Circular Roads, and to preserve family integrity, operated male and female schools. By the end of its first year of operation, it had nearly 3,000 clients, and over 680 children, with 280 of those attending school, as well as around 320 elderly and disabled dependents.

Central to the work of the institution was a requirement for adults of working age to perform tasks, which ranged from spinning and lace-making to preparing building and shipbuilding materials (rope, lime, stone), collecting leftover food, and advertising the work of the charity itself; charges for food were made against the nominal pay for such work.

A further service of the charity was to help destitute individuals to move to places where they had offers of work, or for those from abroad, to repatriate. Applicants for this service had to work in the institution for four weeks while their cases were examined, and provide details of referees, and might then have their fares paid; the charity received discounts from rail and ferry companies.

=== After the Poor Laws ===
After the introduction of the poor law rate system in Ireland, and the opening of workhouses in the North and South Dublin Unions, the demand for the charity's work reduced, falling as low as 400 persons a day, before temporarily rising back to over 2,500 during the years of the Great Famine. In 1852, the institution ceased providing school and pharmacy services, instead subsidising use of independent providers. In the same year it opened public baths, with the aim of improving hygiene among the poorer citizens. The first public bathing facilities in Dublin, and funded by a ball, to which Queen Victoria donated, these comprised 33 regular baths, and one for Jewish ritual bathing. The baths operated until 1909.

=== The 20th century ===
By the 20th century, the main work of the charity was in providing meals for needy people, and with demand having fallen as low as 30 meals a day, it rose again in the 2010s.

=== Headquarters ===
The charity began work in Hawkins Street, renting from the Royal Dublin Society, then moved to Copper Alley.

In 1826, after Edward Parke had undertaken work on a conversion of the former Moira House, it moved to Usher's Island, near the River Liffey, formerly the family house of Lord Moira.

The house had many historical associations. It was here, on 18 May 1798, that Pamela, wife of the rebel patriot Lord Edward FitzGerald, was spending the evening when her husband was betrayed into the hands of his pursuers nearby. During the 1916 Rising, Seán Heuston was ordered to occupy the Institution. He was told to hold this position for three or four hours, to delay the advance of British troops. He actually held it for more than two days, along with 26 Volunteers. With his position becoming untenable against considerable numbers, he had to surrender, and was later executed. The building was damaged, and the government compensation only covered about two thirds of the costs of repair.

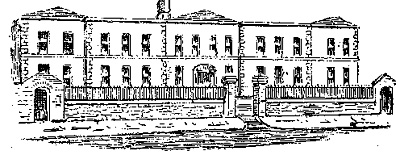
The Mendicity Institution in 1890

The Institution remained at Usher's Island until 1954. The old headquarters was demolished in 1960, however the front gate and railing remain to the present.

== Current operations ==
The charity has three supervisory staff and four project workers, in addition to volunteers, and its services as of 2018 to 2020 include:

- A meal service for the homeless and socially marginalised, offering breakfast, lunch and a light afternoon meal five days a week
- A phone service to provide support and contact for homeless migrants, in English, Russian, Romanian and Polish
- Tutorials in literacy (including teaching of English on a foreign language basis) and computer literacy
- Aid in integration and entry to the employment market
- A workshop facility which makes woodwork and metalwork items for sale at markets and online

A substantial majority of its clients do not have English as a first language, and there are staff supporting clients through Polish, Romanian and Russian.

Other services which have been offered included a homework club with food service for local children, in 2015.

== Governance and funding ==
Some of the projects of the institution receive State support, including the employment support work (Dept. of Justice), while the meal service is supported entirely by donations and the charity's own resources.

The charity has four patrons, the Roman Catholic and Church of Ireland Archbishops of Dublin, and the Deans of St. Patrick's and Christ Church Cathedrals. It is overseen by a Managing Committee and its assets, which include its premises and cash, as of 2018, of almost 3 million euro, reserved for the work of the charity, are secured by a small panel of trustees. It is registered as a charity with the regulatory authorities and the Irish Revenue Commissioners.

== See also ==
- Irish Poor Laws
- The Sick and Indigent Roomkeepers' Society
