= Native Woodland Trust =

Irish reforestation organization

- Formation: 2000
- Type: NGO
- Headquarters: Dublin, Ireland
- Manager: Linda Lawlor
- Website: www.nativewoodlandtrust.ie

The Native Woodland Trust is an Irish environmental non-governmental organisation established in 2000 with the aims of restoring and protecting Irish native woodland. The Trust is dedicated to protecting the remains of Ireland's ancient woodlands from further damage and destruction, letting them grow again, and the restoration of woodland across Ireland using native tree species.

== Governance ==
The Trust's model is a voluntary board of trustees and small core staff with volunteers in local areas. The Trust is registered under 'Irish Woodland Trust' but trades as Native Woodland Trust. The Native Woodland Trust is a member of the Irish Environmental Network and the Irish Environmental Pillar. The Trust is a membership organisation with a subscription magazine, WOODLAND.

== Aims and principles ==
The Trust's stated aims and principles are as follows:

=== Aims ===
- The protection, preservation and expansion of Ireland's existing ancient and semi-natural woodlands.
- The creation of new woodlands throughout Ireland, where these would naturally occur.
- The restoration of the original flora, fauna and avi-fauna of Ireland's woodlands
- To increase native woodland bio-diversity through suitable habitat creation and sensitive management.
- The preservation of every species and identifiable genotype of Ireland's native trees.

=== Principles ===
- New woodlands will only be created using native seed from native species from within a 10-mile radius of the new woodland (NNN). Where this is not possible, the nearest native source will be used.
- Where re-introduction of an extinct species is proposed, new stock will be sourced from a region of similar climate and conditions, taking into account historical evidence of specific attributes.
- Expansion of existing woodlands will, as far as possible, be allowed to occur by natural regeneration.
- Management of woodlands will be undertaken to the exclusion of all exotic flora and fauna, except where this may adversely effect native species or will be to the detriment of an area of beauty or local significance.
- Hunting, trapping and harvesting will not be permitted on Trust property except where it applies to the management of exotic species.
- Management of woodlands will be based on minimal human intervention, exceptions being: for the safety of visitors and the general public, where an area of land or woodland contains another habitat type, which is deemed to be of significance, it shall be maintained in its natural or non-woodland state, or for the support of troubled native species for the elimination of exotic species where an existing management scheme is in place and its cessation will cause a reduction in bio-diversity
- Any human intervention will be carried out using traditional techniques with minimal use of mechanised equipment.
- All donated woodlands shall be held in their natural state, in the ownership of the Trust, in perpetuity.
- It shall be deemed acceptable, in exceptional circumstances, for a woodland or land (which has not been donated)to be sold or swapped in order to better facilitate the overall aims of the trust, but not for reasons of commercial gain or future (unknown) investment.
- All woodlands shall be open to the public and shall be held for the enjoyment of the general public, subject to issues of safety and conservation.

== Nature reserves ==
The Native Woodland Trust owns or manages 11 nature reserves in the Republic of Ireland.

=== Ardan Wood ===
Ardan Wood is a remnant of ancient woodland in County Westmeath

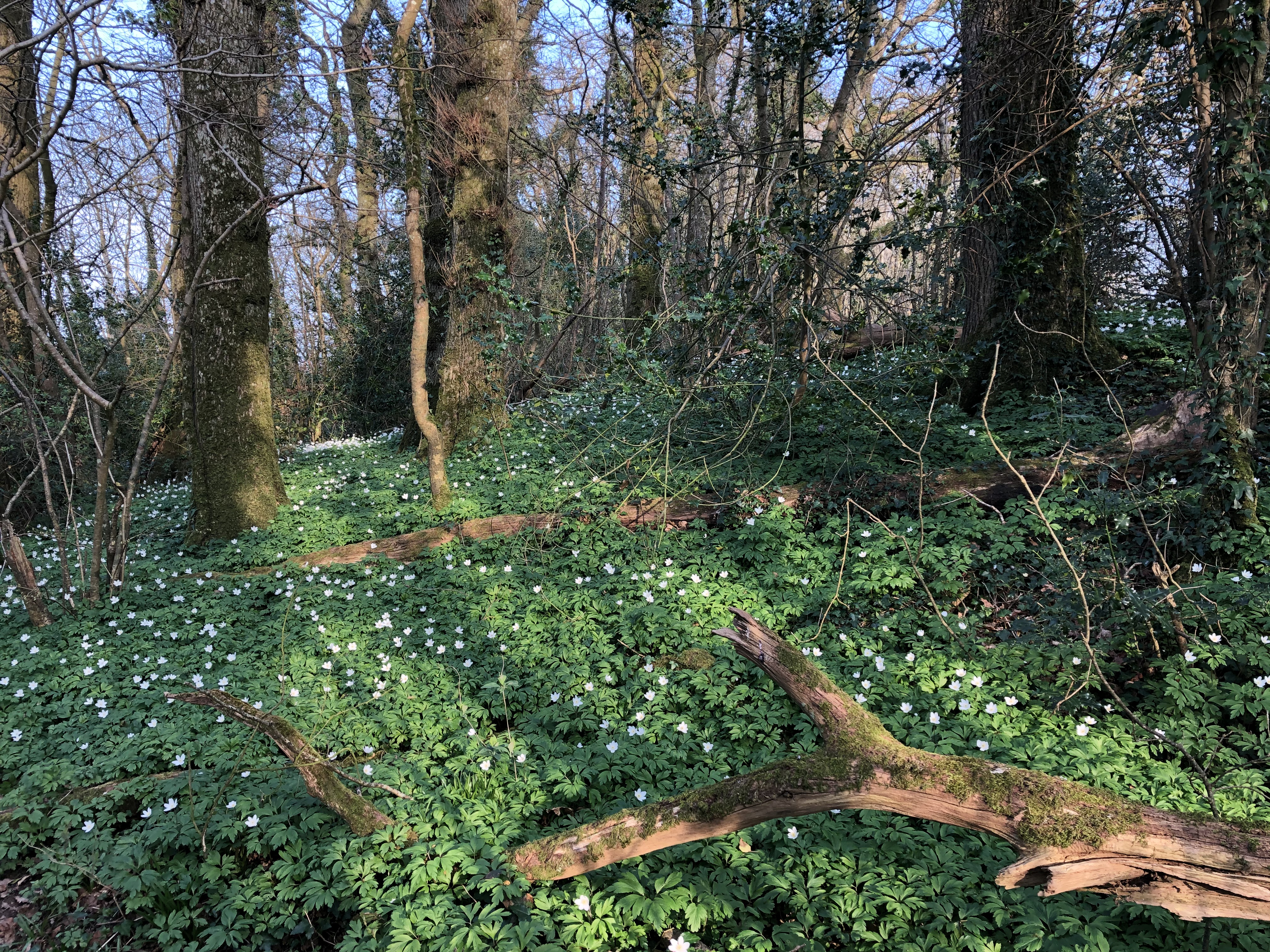
Anemones in Ardan Wood in March

It was the first site that the Native Woodland Trust acquired.

=== Farnaght Wood ===
Farnaght Wood is a 7-acre on the Longford/Leitrim county border that was acquired with the purpose of creating new native woodland.

=== Blessington ===
The Trust's Blessington site sits on the Poulaphuca lakes in Wicklow behind Russborough House. The Blessington site is a sixteen-acre site on the N81 on the border with Kildare.

=== Humphreystown ===
Humphrystown Wood is located further south along the Blesington lakes in Wickow

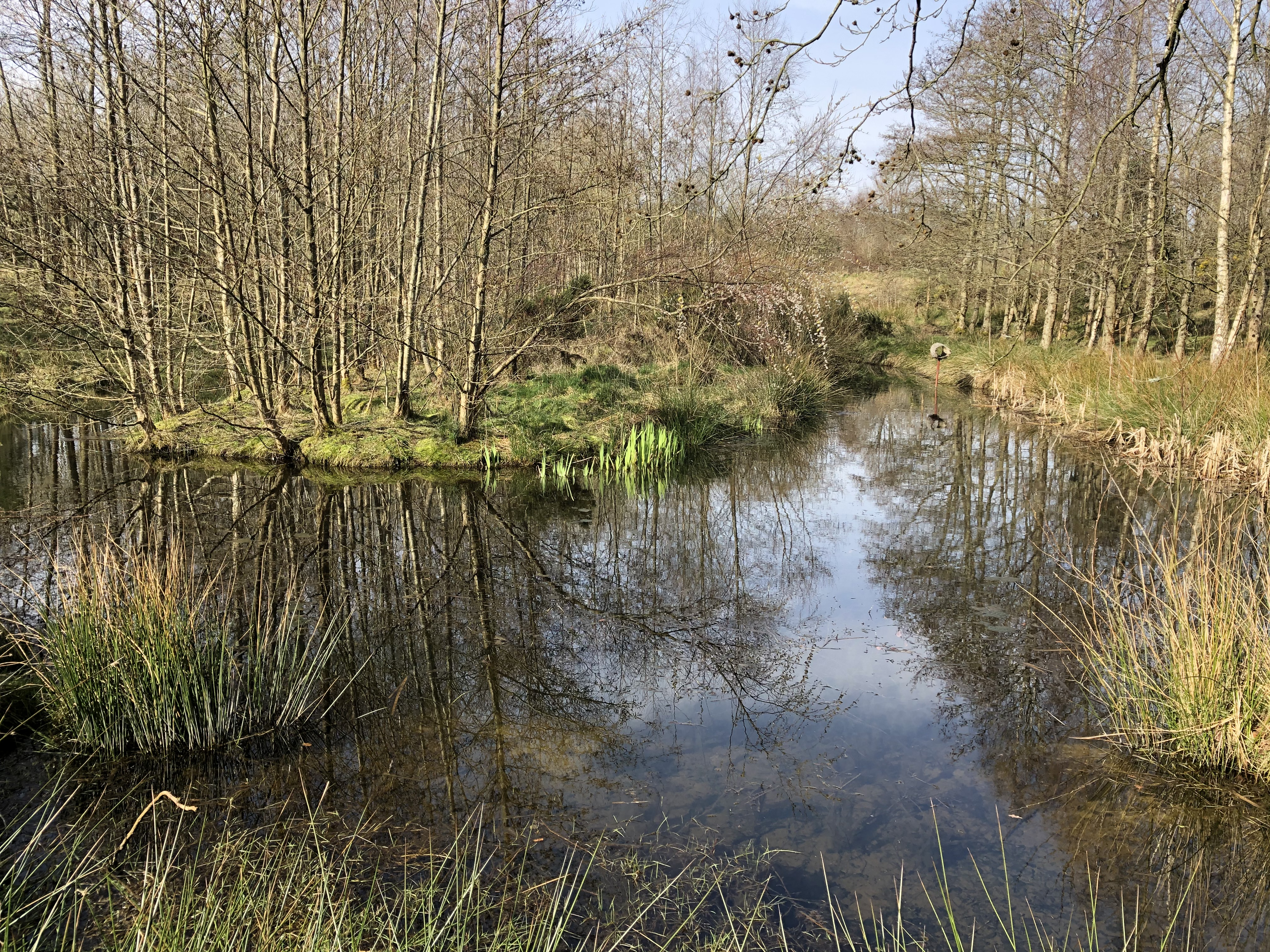
Pond at Humphreystown Wood

=== Coille na Luise ===
Coille na Luise is located above the village of Laragh, County Wicklow and overlooking Annamoe. It was acquired for planting new woodland and was named after a 200+ year old rowan tree found on the site, luis being an old Irish word for rowan.

=== Girley Wood ===
Girley Wood was established on the edges of Girley Bog in County Meath.

=== Camcor Wood ===
In the foothills of the Slieve Blooms mountains in County Offaly.

=== St. John's Wood ===
The Native Woodland Trust owns a small section of the famous ancient woodland of St. John's in County Roscommon

=== Lecarrow Wood ===
Adjacent St. John's Wood site the Trust acquired some land for regeneration and the establishment of a tree nursery.

=== Gracedieu Wood ===
The site is a 7.5-acre site, bounded by the River Suir and the N25; it was created during construction work for the new City bypass, and was used to store topsoil excavated as part of the road building, in Waterford City.

=== Toradh Wood ===
This recently acquired site sits on the edge of Toradh Lough near the village of Glen, County Donegal.
