= Ian Lumley =

Irish conservationist (born 1958)

- Born: 1958 (age 67–68); Waterford
- Organization: An Taisce
- Known for: Heritage and environmental activist

Ian Lumley (born 1958) is an Irish conservationist, who served with An Taisce - The National Trust for Ireland over an extended period, principally as its heritage officer, and latterly as one of its three senior managers, as head of advocacy.

== Personal life ==
Ian Lumley was born in Waterford in 1958.

In 1982, Lumley purchased a house on Henrietta Street in Dublin, a street of substantially intact early Georgian houses, and worked on its restoration over many years. His kitchen was used as a television scene in the series Penny Dreadful.

In 1992, Lumley was a co-founder of the Dublin Civic Trust.

Lumley also sat on the board of the Heritage Council for a number of years.

He partnered with a developer to restore another property at 3 Henrietta Street in 2019, partly funded by income from short-let accommodation.

== Conservation work ==
Lumley was a volunteer with An Taisce for many years before becoming its heritage officer around 2000, and in 2023 taking up the new post on a rationalised senior management team of three, as "head of advocacy", overseeing the organisation's work on planning and policy. Described in the Irish Times as "one of Ireland's most courageous guardians of the built and natural environment", Lumley has focused his approach on using legal tools and processes to address developments of concern.

Lumley has also worked as director of projects with the Dublin Civic Trust and held a senior role with the Spitalfields Historic Buildings Trust in London. Much of Lumley's work, even in formal roles, has been unpaid.

Lumley also has sat on the board of the Alfred Beit Foundation which looks after Russborough House as a nominee of An Taisce.

== Environmental and heritage campaigning ==
In January 2005, Lumley was barred from acting as a director of certain companies for five years, after a High Court hearing into the liquidation of Lancefort Limited, a company he co-founded in 1996 to campaign on environmental and planning issues along with Michael Smith. The company was wound up in 2002, after the High Court awarded £23,000 costs in a case against Treasury Holdings relating to the Westin Hotel on College Green, Dublin. Lancefort was represented in various cases by then barrister Colm Mac Eochaidh. The parties were also involved in the £10,000 reward for information leading to convictions for planning corruption which ultimately lead to the establishment of the Flood Tribunal, later named the Mahon Tribunal.
