= The Sick and Indigent Roomkeepers' Society =

Charity in Dublin, Ireland

The Sick and Indigent Roomkeepers Society in Dublin, Ireland, is the city's oldest surviving charity.

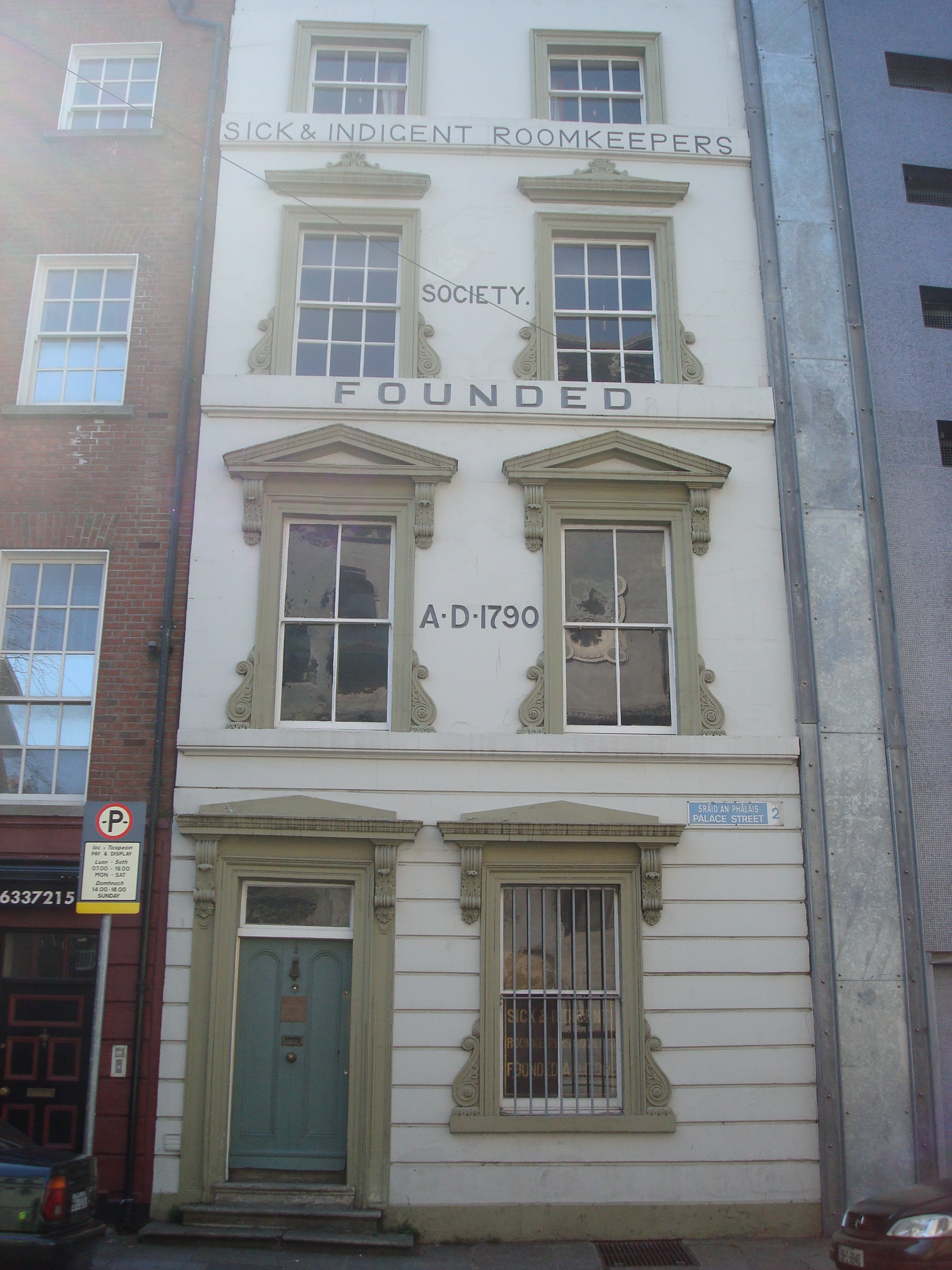
The Society's original building outside Dublin Castle.

== History ==
The society was one of many that were established in Georgian Dublin to relieve the poverty that pervaded the city at that time. There was no system of public welfare, nor, until much later, any general policy on the part of the government to alleviate the problem of poverty. It was left to parishes (which in the poorer areas of the city had very little to spare), private individuals and institutions to ease poverty through voluntary work. With this object in mind a group of men met in Mountrath St. on 15 March 1790 to form a society "to be called the Charitable Society for the Relief of Sick and Indigent Roomkeepers of all Religious Persuasions in the City of Dublin."

The founders of the society were, as described in the History of Dublin (1815), "a few individuals in the middle ranks of life, inhabiting a part of the town where the population was poor and crowded, had daily opportunities of knowing that many poor creatures who were unable to dig and ashamed to beg, expired of want and were often found dead in the sequestred garrets and cellars to which they had silently returned". The part of town referred to was north of the river Liffey, in the parish of St. Michan's. The Society has traditionally acknowledged the following to have been the founders: Samuel Rosborough (linen draper), Christopher Connolly (grocer), Patrick Magin (grocer), Philip Shea (carpenter), Michael Stedman (stone-cutter), Peter Fleming (fruitman), Timothy Knowlan (pawnbroker), Thomas Wilmot, William Blacker, Laurence Toole (schoolmaster) and James Reilly. Members paid a subscription of at least 2 pence per week, which entitled them to recommend deserving persons to be given relief by the Society.

Samuel Rosborough was for many years treasurer of the Society. He died on 3 November 1832 and was buried in St. Michan's church. On the 30th anniversary of his death a tablet was erected in the church to commemorate his good deeds.

== See also ==
- Mendicity Institution
