= South Frederick Street =

Street in Dublin, Ireland

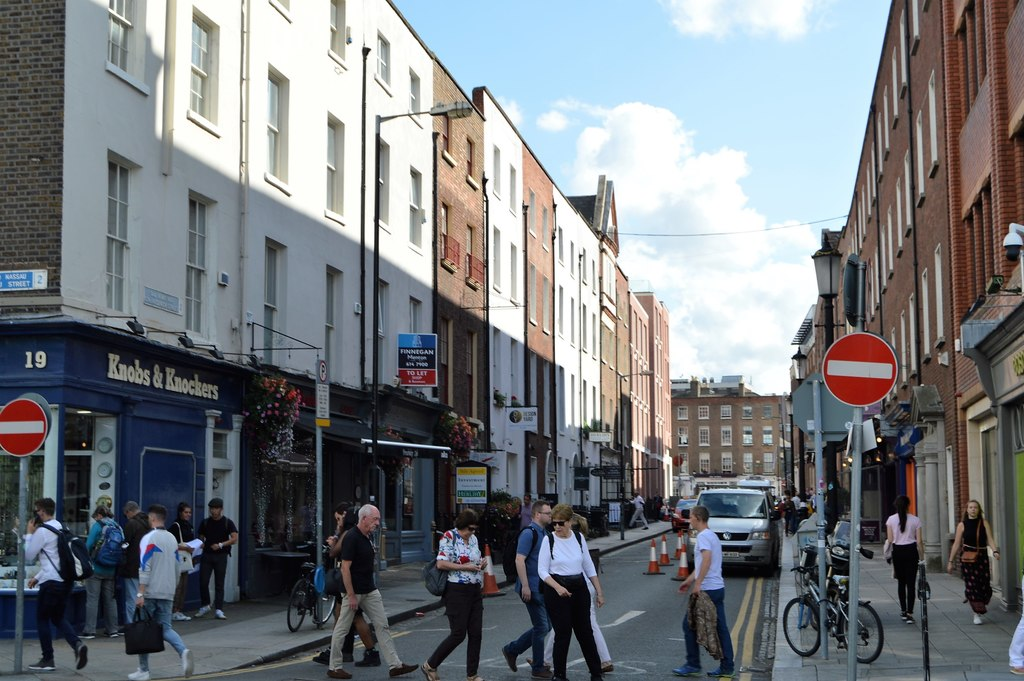
- Looking up South Frederick Street from Nassau Street in 2016
- Interactive map of South Frederick Street
- Native name: Sráid Fhreidric Theas (Irish)
- Former name: Library Street
- Location: Dublin, Ireland
- Postal code: D02
- Coordinates: 53°20′31″N 6°15′24″W
- north end: Nassau Street
- Major junctions: Setanta Place
- south end: Molesworth Street

South Frederick Street (Irish: Sráid Fhreidric Theas) is a Georgian street in Dublin, Ireland which connects Nassau Street with Molesworth Street. The street is intersected by Setanta Place and is connected via a covered arch laneway to Dawson Lane.

== History ==
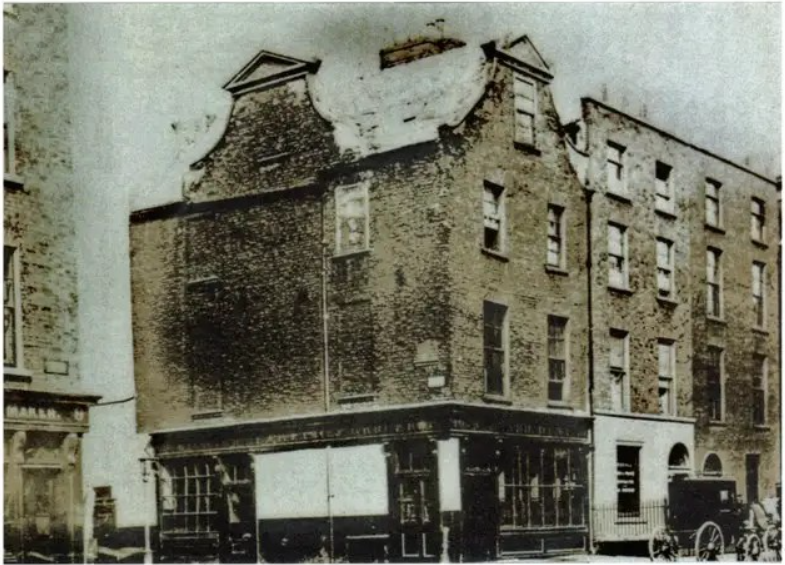
Corner of 10 Molesworth Street and South Frederick Street around 1890

Originally known as Library Street, as it faced the Old library designed by Thomas Burgh. It was likely renamed for Frederick, Prince of Wales and first appears as South Frederick Street on John Rocque's map of Dublin of 1756.

Many of the remaining houses date from the 1750s, though many have been demolished and replaced with office buildings. On the corner of South Frederick Street and Molesworth Street is an office building dating to 1933 designed by Patrick J.F. Munden. Numbers 5-9 are an office block dating from the 1960s.

Two of the houses on the street from circa 1750, numbers 10 and 11, were renovated by the Dublin Civic Trust in the early 1990s as its first project. The properties were originally planned to be demolished by New Ireland Assurance but were donated as part of a planning compliance arrangement.

=== Notable residents ===
- Artist Graham Knuttel lived on the street for 20 years at number 11.
- Rossa Fanning
