= Deirdre Kelly (campaigner) =

Irish campaigner

- Born: 15 May 1938; Dublin, Ireland
- Died: 16 February 2000 (aged 61)

Deirdre Kelly (15 May 1938 – 16 February 2000) was an Irish environmental and community activist and campaigner. She was a founder of the Living City Group in Dublin and the Dublin Civic Group along with Kevin B. Nowlan.

== Life ==
Deirdre Kelly was born in Dublin in 1938. She was educated in Dublin, and having studied in the National College of Art she worked taught art at the Vocational Educational College in Inchicore and as an archaeological artist at the National Museum of Ireland. She graduated with a BA history and archaeology from University College Dublin in 1970. Living in central Dublin in the 1960s, she became active in the campaign against the demolition of Georgian and Victorian buildings and community displacement in Dublin. She took part in the "Battle for Hume Street" in June 1970. She went on to found the Living City Group in 1970. She published the book Hands off Dublin in 1976 with photographer Pat Langan, and was very active in the campaign to save Wood Quay from redevelopment. Kelly died on 16 February 2000.
