= Development and preservation in Dublin =

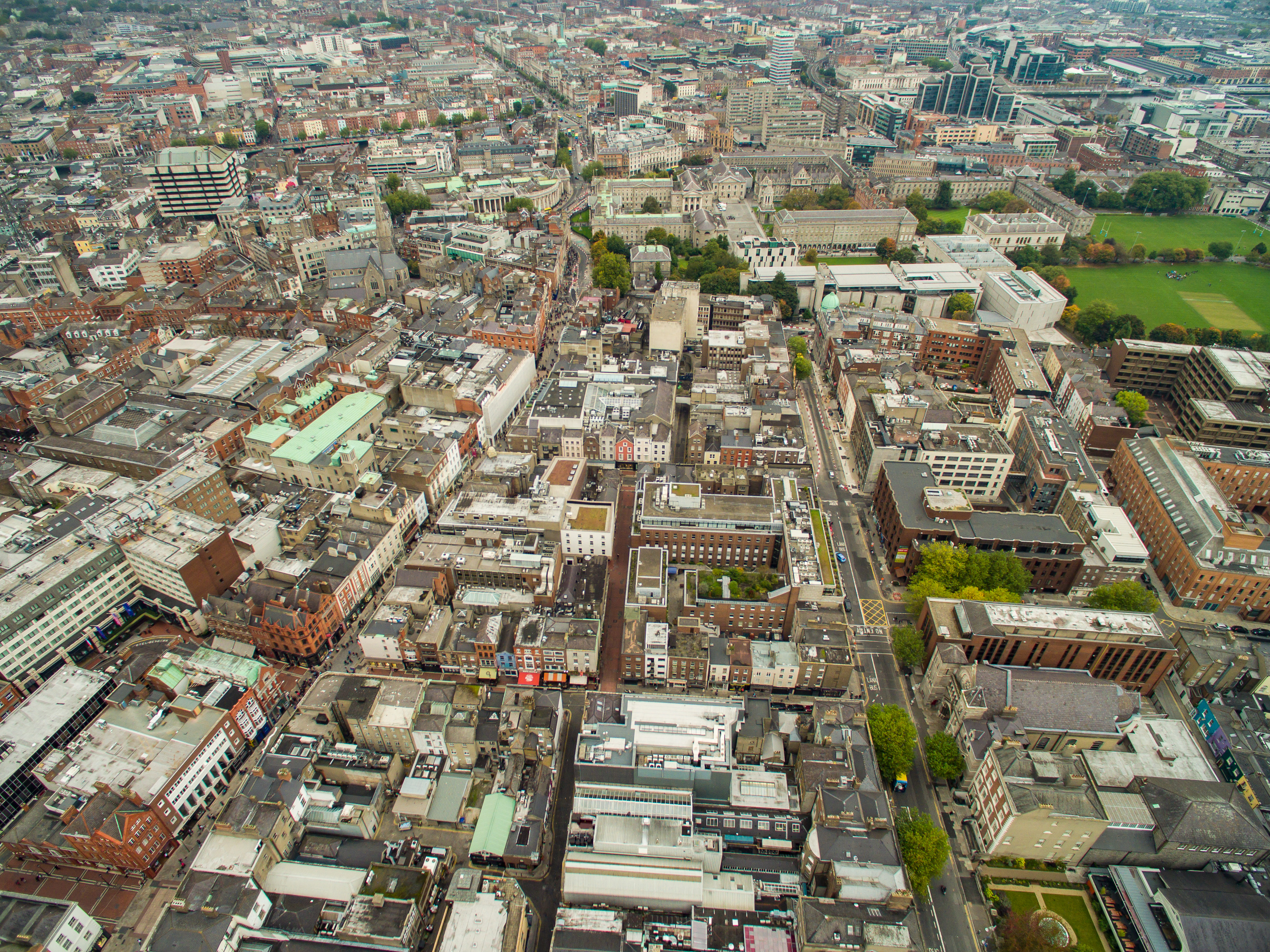
Aerial view of Dublin's south city centre, looking northwards towards Trinity College

Dublin is one of the oldest capital cities in Europe – dating back over a thousand years. Over the centuries and particularly in the 18th century or Georgian era, it acquired a distinctive style of architecture. Since the 1960s, Dublin has been extensively re-developed, sometimes resulting in the replacement of earlier buildings. Some of this has been controversial with preservationists regarding the development as unwelcome.

== Georgian Dublin ==
In 1932, Éamon de Valera's Fianna Fáil party won a majority at the general election. With greater finances available, major changes began to take place. A scheme of replacing tenements with decent housing for Dublin's poor began. Plans were proposed for the wholesale demolition of many buildings from the Georgian era, which had become tenements.

The Viceregal Lodge was proposed for demolition, to make way for a new residence for the new office of President of Ireland, an office created in the 1937 Constitution of Ireland. Merrion Square, with its large Georgian mansions, was proposed for demolition, to be replaced on its three sides by a national museum, national Roman Catholic cathedral and national art gallery. Though plans were made, few were put into effect and those not implemented were put on hold when in September 1939 World War II began. Dublin escaped the mass bombing of the war due to Ireland's neutrality, though some bombs were dropped by the German air-force and hit the North Strand, a working-class district.

By 1945, the planned replacement of Georgian Dublin were abandoned and the Viceregal Lodge (renamed in 1938 Áras an Uachtaráin) was restored as a presidential residence.

From the 1950s onwards, Georgian Dublin became imperilled by Irish Government development policies. On Mountjoy Square derelict sites proliferated. When a row of large Georgian houses in Kildare Place near Leinster House was demolished a Fianna Fáil minister, Kevin Boland celebrated, saying that they had stood for everything he opposed. He also condemned the leaders of the Irish Georgian Society, established to preserve Georgian buildings, some of whom came from aristocratic backgrounds, as "belted earls".

In the 1960s, the world's longest line of Georgian buildings was interrupted when the ESB was allowed to build a modern office block. By the 1980s, road-widening schemes by Dublin Corporation ran through some old areas of the inner city around Christ Church Cathedral. In 1979 Dublin Corporation developed an office block on an unearthed Viking site Wood Quay.

== 1980s – A change in policy ==
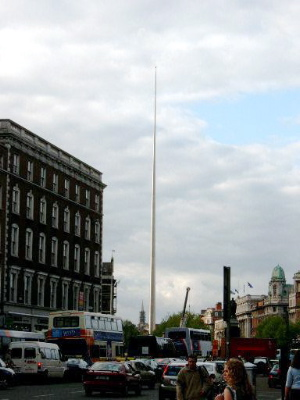
The Spire of Dublin, one of Dublin's newest monuments, is the world's largest sculpture

In the 1980s and 1990s, greater efforts were made to preserve Dublin's older buildings. Dublin Corporation's road-widening schemes were abandoned. Strict preservation rules were applied, keeping intact the remaining squares, though St Stephen's Green of the three southern squares had already lost much of its Georgian architecture.

The 1960s had seen one of the earliest battles to preserve Georgian Dublin, in what became known as the Battle of Hume Street whose corner opened onto St. Stephen's Green. There an ultimately successful attempt by a property developer to demolish a block of Georgian houses hit the national headlines, and became a cause célèbre as students, celebrities and future politicians battled to stop the demolition of the Georgian buildings. The original buildings were lost, and the developer built Georgian style buildings on the site.

By the 1990s Dublin Corporation became active in the preservation of the Georgian buildings; among the results was the restoration of City Hall to its eighteenth-century interior (removing Victorian and Edwardian additions and rebuilds), and the replacement of Nelson's Pillar (a monument on O'Connell Street which had dominated the skyline until being blown up in 1966 by republicans) by a new Spire of Dublin, the world's tallest sculpture, on the site of the old Pillar and which could be seen throughout the city.

== Temple Bar ==
The change in attitude was reflected in the development of Temple Bar, one of the few parts of Dublin that survived the destruction of medieval streets by the developers of the Georgian era. It retained its original medieval street plan. As late as the mid-1980s, Temple Bar was seen as a poor, run down segment of the city, stretching in terms of length from the Old Houses of Parliament in College Green to Parliament Street, which faced City Hall, and which in terms of width stretched from Dame Street to the city quays. In the 1970s, Córas Iompair Éireann (CIÉ), the state transport company, bought up many of the buildings in this area, with a view to building a large modern central bus station on the site. This would replace the medieval streets and buildings (while the street pattern was medieval, most of the buildings were not, dating from the eighteenth or nineteenth century) by one large bus station with a shopping centre attached. However, delays in providing the financing led CIÉ to rent out the buildings at nominal rents. Most of the buildings were rented by artists, producing a sudden and unexpected appearance of a 'cultural quarter' that earned comparisons with Paris's Left Bank. Though CIÉ remained nominally committed to its planned redevelopment, the vibrancy of the Temple Bar area led to demands for its preservation. By the late 1980s, the bus station plans were abandoned and a master plan put in place to maintain the Temple Bar's position as Dublin's cultural heartland.

The result was that the medieval street plan survived, however rents rose sharply, forcing the artists elsewhere. They have been replaced by restaurants and bars which draw thousands of tourists. This has been criticised by some for over commercialisation and excessive alcohol consumption. Some of the more historic buildings in the area have been altered in this process, notably St. Michael and John's Roman Catholic Church, one of the city's oldest Catholic churches, which pre-dates the repeal of the Penal Laws and Catholic Emancipation. Its interior was developed to be replaced by a tourist-orientated "Viking adventure centre" which ran into financial problems.

Temple Bar was used as a set for some of the exterior scenes in the film Far and Away.

Between December 2002 and January 2003, the Spire of Dublin was erected on O'Connell Street. A 120 m tall tapered metal pole, it is the tallest structure of Dublin city centre, visible for miles. It was assembled from seven pieces with the largest crane available in Ireland. It replaced Nelson's Pillar which was blown up in 1966.

== Archer's Garage incident ==
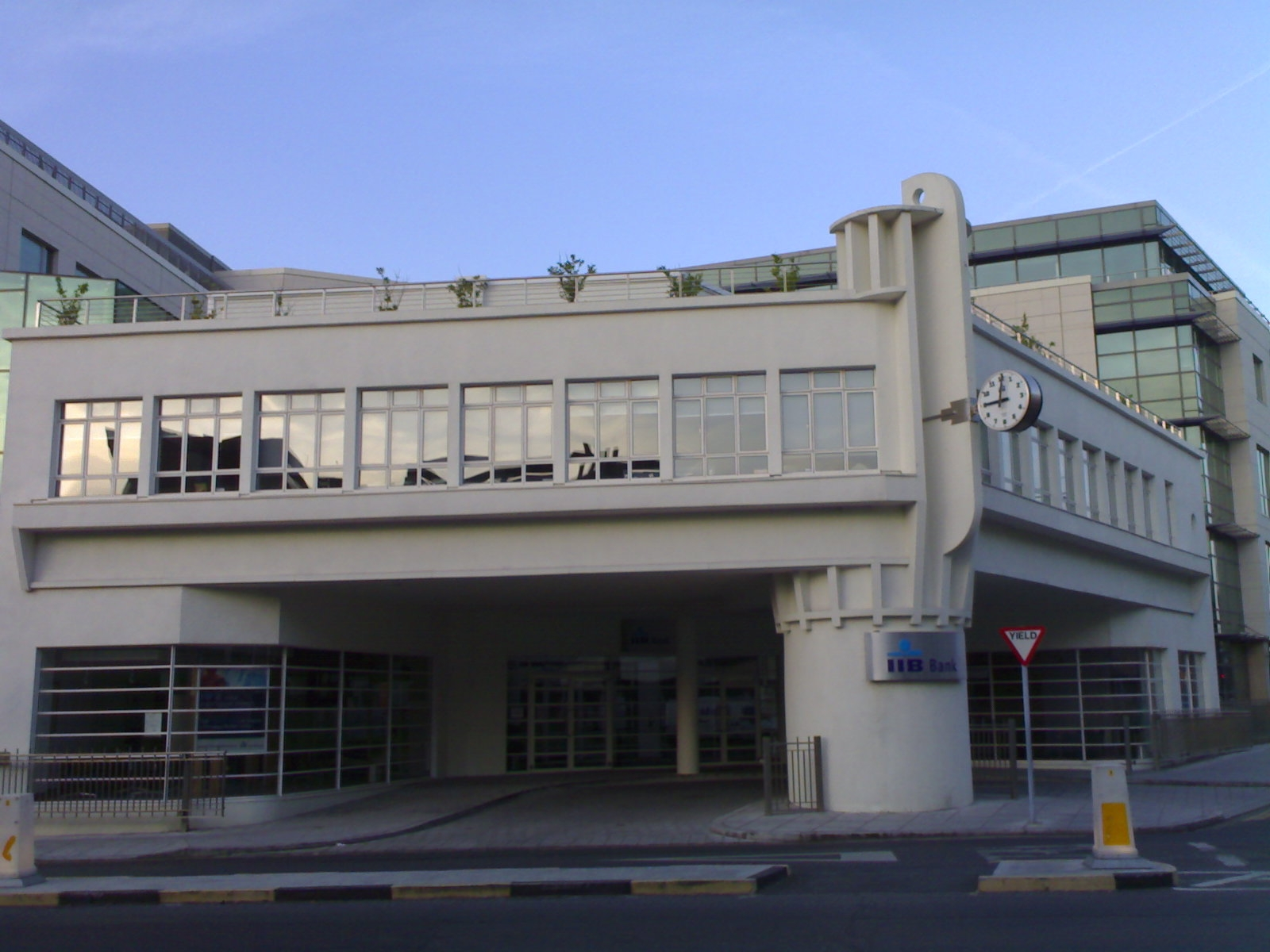
The Rebuilt Archer's Garage, Dublin

In June 1999, the art deco, protected garage on Fenian Street was illegally demolished by contractors working for the O'Callaghan hotel group. Following some vocal opposition the developer Noel O'Callaghan reconstructed the Garage after he was ordered by Dublin City Council on threat of a €1,000,000 fine and/or imprisonment.

The reconstruction is not an accurate replication of the original.

== See also ==
- History of Dublin
- Students Against the Destruction of Dublin
- Dublin Civic Trust
