= List of museums in the Republic of Ireland =

This list of museums in Republic of Ireland contains museums which are defined for this context as institutions (including nonprofit organizations, government entities, and private businesses) that collect and care for objects of cultural, artistic, scientific, or historical interest and make their collections or related exhibits available for public viewing. Also included are non-profit art galleries and university art galleries. Museums that exist only in cyberspace (i.e., virtual museums) are not included. Many other small historical displays are located in the country's stately homes, including those run by An Taisce – The National Trust for Ireland.

Name	Image	Town/city	County	Province	Region	Type	Summary
Abbeyleix Heritage House		Abbeyleix	Laois	Leinster	Irish Midlands	Local	website, local history, culture
Allihies Copper Mine Museum		Allihies	Cork	Munster	South-West	Mining	Over 3500 years of area copper mining
An Post Museum		Dublin	County Dublin	Leinster	Dublin	Philately	Postal service in the Republic of Ireland, Irish stamps
Aran Heritage Centre		Kilronan	Galway	Connacht	West	Local	Island history, culture, fishing
Áras an Uachtaráin		Dublin	Dublin	Leinster	Dublin	Historic house	Official residence of the President of Ireland, located in the Phoenix Park
Ardgillan Castle		Balbriggan	Dublin	Leinster	Dublin	Historic house	18th-century country house and park
Arigna Mining Experience		Arigna	Roscommon	Connacht	West	Mining	coal-mining and underground tour
Arklow Maritime Museum		Arklow	Wicklow	Leinster	Mid-East	Maritime	website, Maritime artefacts, shipbuilders' models, half models, plans, art
Ashtown Castle		Dublin	Dublin	Leinster	Dublin	Historic house	Fortified medieval tower house, located in the Phoenix Park
Athenry Castle		Athenry	Galway	Connacht	West	Historic house	website, medieval castle
Athenry Heritage Centre		Athenry	Galway	Connacht	West	Multiple	website, medieval and local history, arts centre
Aughnanure Castle		Oughterard	Galway	Connacht	West	Historic house	Medieval tower house remains
Avondale House		Rathdrum	Wicklow	Leinster	Mid-East	Historic house	Mid-19th-century-period birthplace and home of political leader Charles Stewart Parnell
Ballina Arts Centre		Ballina	Mayo	Connacht	West	Art	website, multidisciplinary arts centre with gallery
Ballintubber Abbey		Ballintubber	Mayo	Connacht	West	Religious	Medieval royal abbey still in use, part in ruins
Ballymore Historic Features		Camolin	Wexford	Leinster	South-East	Agriculture	website, traditional farm and museum of rural life
Bantry Museum		Bantry	Cork	Munster	South-West	Local	information, local history, operated by the Bantry Historical Society
Bantry House		Bantry	Cork	Munster	South-West	Historic house	18th-century mansion featuring fine furnishings and decorations, gardens
Barryscourt Castle		Carrigtwohill	Cork	Munster	South-West	Historic house	Tours of the restored 16th-century castle
Battle Of Aughrim Interpretative Centre		Aughrim	Galway	Connacht	West	Military	information, history of the Battle of Aughrim in 1691
Battle of the Boyne Interpretative Centre		Drogheda	Meath	Leinster	Mid-East	Historic house and battle field	website, history of the Battle of the Boyne fought in 1690
Beaulieu House, Gardens & Car Museum		Drogheda	Louth	Leinster	Border	Historic house	Manor house dating from 1710 and car museum
Belcarra Eviction Cottage		Belcarra	Mayo	Connacht	West	Local	information, reconstructed 19th-century cottage with displays on local history
Belltable Arts Centre		Limerick	Limerick	Munster	Mid-West	Art	Multidisciplinary arts centre with gallery
Belvedere College Museum		Dublin	County Dublin	Leinster	Dublin	Historic house and school	School museum documenting past pupils of Belvedere College and school history contained in Belvedere House
Belvedere House and Gardens		Mullingar	Westmeath	Leinster	Irish Midlands	Historic house	Georgian estate and gardens
Bishop Daniel Delany Museum		Tullow	Carlow	Leinster	South-East	Biographical	webpage, life and artefact of Bishop Daniel Delany
Blackrock Castle		Cork	Cork	South-West	Munster	Science	Observatory with space and science exhibits, tours of the castle and dungeon
Blennerville Windmill		Blennerville	Kerry	Munster	South-West	Mill	Restored 19th-century windmill with exhibits on the mill, Irish emigration, area natural history
Boyle Abbey		Boyle	Roscommon	Connacht	West	Religious	Medieval abbey ruins and exhibition about its history in the restored gatehouse
Bray Heritage Centre		Kilpedder	Wicklow	Leinster	Mid-East	Local	information, local history
Bunratty Castle & Folk Park		Bunratty	Clare	Munster	Mid-West	Open air	Medieval fortress with period furnishings and artefacts, 19th-century living village
Burren Centre		Kilfenora	Clare	Munster	Mid-West	Natural history	website, natural history, megalithic tombs and monuments of The Burren
Cahir Castle		Cahir	County Tipperary	Munster	South-East	Historic house	Medieval fortress castle
Cape Clear Museum		Cape Clear Island	Cork	Munster	South-West	Local	website, local history, culture
Carlow County Museum		Carlow	Carlow	Leinster	South-East	Local	Local history and archaeology. Free admission
Carrick Craft Basketry Museum		Mountnugent	Cavan	Ulster	Border	Art	website, traditional baskets in rod, rush and straw
Carrowmore Megalithic Cemetery		Clifden	Sligo	Connacht	Border	Archaeology	Visitor centre and cemetery of megalithic tombs
Castlerea Railway Museum		Castlerea	Roscommon	Connacht	West	Railway	website, also known as Hells Kitchen Museum, railway memorabilia including a restored A55 diesel locomotive, bells, lamps, shunting poles, signal equipment, staffs, station boards and more
Castletown House		Celbridge	Kildare	Leinster	Mid-East	Historic house	18th-century Palladian country house
Cavan and Leitrim Railway		Dromod	Leitrim	Connacht	Border	Railway	Heritage narrow-gauge railway and museum
Cavan County Museum		Ballyjamesduff	Cavan	Ulster	Border	Local	Local history, culture, archaeology, Celtic heritage, rural life, costumes, art exhibits
Cavanacor House		Lifford	Donegal	Ulster	Border	Historic house	website, 17th-century plantation house, ancestral family ties to U.S. President James K. Polk, features historic furniture, art exhibits
Céide Fields		Ballycastle	Mayo	Connacht	West	Archaeology	Visitor centre and Stone Age monument consisting of field systems, dwelling areas and megalithic tombs
Celtic Furrow Visitor Centre		Ballintubber	Mayo	Connacht	West	History	information, traces cultural, historical and spiritual roots in Ireland over 5,000 years, rural life
Chester Beatty Library		Dublin	Dublin	Leinster	Dublin	Multiple	Exhibits of manuscripts, miniature paintings, prints, drawings, rare books and some decorative arts from the Islamic, East Asian and Western collections
Clare Archaeology Centre		Corofin	Clare	Munster	Mid-West	Archaeology	Located at Dysert O’Dea Castle, area artefacts and trail of ruins
Clare Heritage Centre Museum		Corofin	Clare	Munster	Mid-West	Local	website, local history, culture, emigration to other countries
Clare Museum		Ennis	Clare	Munster	Mid-West	Local	website, local history, culture, geology, agriculture, influence of Christianity, River Shannon and maritime heritage, West Clare Railway
Claypipe Centre		Knockcroghery	Roscommon	Connacht	West	Industry	website, craft workshop for making clay pipes, display of historic designs and history of the village's clay pipe industry
Clew Bay Heritage Centre		Westport	Mayo	Connacht	West	Local	information, local history, culture
Cliffs of Moher Visitor Centre		Killaloe	Clare	Munster	Mid-West	Natural history	Exhibits on the ocean, weather, climate, geology, wildlife, local history and culture
Clogher Heritage Complex		Claremorris	Mayo	Connacht	West	Historic house	information, constructed 19th-century-period thatched cottage, outdoor display of farm machinery, working forge
Clonalis House		Castlerea	Roscommon	Connacht	West	Historic house	Late-19th-century mansion
Cobh Heritage Centre		Cobh	Cork	Munster	South-West	History	Life in Ireland through the 18th and 19th centuries, the mass emigration, the Great Famine, how criminals were transported to Australia
Colmcille Heritage Centre		Gartan	Donegal	Ulster	Border	Religious	website, life of 6th-century Saint Colmcille, one of the Twelve Apostles of Ireland
Connemara Heritage and History Centre		Clifden	Galway	Connacht	West	Open air	Includes restored prefamine early-19th-century cottage and farm, reconstructions of a crannóg, ring fort and a clochaun
Cork Butter Museum		Cork	Cork	Munster	South-West	Food	website, dairy culture in Ireland and the butter trade
Cork City Gaol		Cork	Cork	South-West	Munster	Prison	website, late-19th- to early-20th-century-period prison scenes with wax figures
Cork Public Museum		Cork	Cork	Munster	South-West	Multiple	website, city history, archaeology, trades and crafts, lace, military, ethnographic artefacts, costumes
Cork Vision Centre		Cork	Cork	Munster	South-West	Multiple	website, changing exhibits of culture, art, local history, photography
County Carlow Military Museum		Carlow	Carlow	Leinster	South-East	Military	website
County Museum Dundalk		Dundalk	Louth	Leinster	Border	Local	website, also known as Louth County Museum, local history, culture, archaeology, social history, agriculture, industry
Craggaunowen – the Living Past Experience		Sixmilebridge	Clare	Munster	Mid-West	Open air	Interprets Ireland’s pre-historic and early Christian eras, includes Craggaunowen Castle
Crawford Municipal Art Gallery		Cork	Cork	Munster	South-West	Art	Collection includes European and Irish art, casts of classical Greek and Roman statues
Croagh Patrick Visitor Center		Murrisk	Mayo	Connacht	West	Multiple	Archaeology, natural history and religious significance of the mountain and pilgrimage site
Cruachan Aí Heritage Centre		Tulsk	Roscommon	Connacht	West	Archaeology	website, archaeology, mythology, and history of the Celtic Royal Sites at Rathcroghan mound and the medieval village of Tulsk
Dartfield Horse Museum and Heritage Centre		Dartfield	Galway	Connacht	West	Multiple	website, Irish horses, Connemara Ponies and Irish dogs, country life, vintage cars
De Valera Museum and Bruree Heritage Centre		Bruree	Limerick	Munster	Mid-West	Biographical	information, life of former President of Ireland Éamon de Valera, local history
Derryglad Folk Museum		Curraghboy	Roscommon	Connacht	West	History	website, farm and folk life in Ireland from the 18th to the 20th century
Drimnagh Castle		Drimnagh	Dublin	Leinster	Dublin	Historic house	
Drogheda Museum Millmount		Drogheda	Louth	Leinster	Border	History	Website History, social, culture, archaeology, geology.
Doagh Famine Village		Doagh Island	Donegal	Ulster	Border	Open air	website, island village tours depicting life in the area from the 1840s Famine through to the late 20th century
Donaghmore Famine Workhouse Museum		Donaghmore	Laois	Leinster	Irish Midlands	History	website, life in the workhouse, also agriculture
Donegal Castle		Donegal	Donegal	Ulster	Border	Historic house	Furnished 15th- to 17th-century castle
Donegal Ancestry Centre		Ramelton	Donegal	Ulster	Border	Local	website, includes a heritage exhibition about Ramelton's history and culture, also a genealogy centre
Donegal County Museum		Letterkenny	Donegal	Ulster	Border	Local	Local history, culture, archaeology, social history and folklife
Donegal Railway Centre		Donegal	Donegal	Ulster	Border	Railway	Heritage railway and museum
Douglas Hyde Centre		Frenchpark	Roscommon	Connacht	West	Biographical	website, life of Douglas Hyde, scholar of the Irish language who served as the first President of Ireland from 1938 to 1945
Douglas Hyde Gallery		Dublin	Dublin	Leinster	Dublin	Art	Contemporary art
Dublin Castle		Dublin	Dublin	Leinster	Dublin	Historic house	Medieval fortress now used for state occasions, tours of the state apartments, undercroft, Chapel Royal, craft shop, heritage centre
Dublin City Gallery The Hugh Lane		Dublin	Dublin	Leinster	Dublin	Art	Municipal gallery of contemporary Irish art, formerly the Hugh Lane Municipal Gallery
Dublin Writers Museum		Dublin	Dublin	Leinster	Dublin	Literary	Irish writings and literature
Dunbrody		New Ross	Wexford	Leinster	South-East	Maritime	Replica 19th-century sailing ship with exhibits about Irish emigrants
Duncannon Fort		Duncannon	Wexford	Leinster	South-East	Military	website, star-shaped 16th-century fort used to house prisoners from the Irish Rebellion of 1798, also features a maritime museum, children's museum and art gallery
Dunfanaghy Workhouse Heritage Centre		Dunfanaghy	Donegal	Ulster	Border	Multiple	website, local history and culture, the Great Famine, life in the workhouse, art exhibits
Dungarvan Castle		Dungarvan	Waterford	Munster	South-East	Military	website, medieval castle keep with 18th-century military barracks
Dunguaire Castle		Kinvara	Galway	Connacht	West	Historic house	16th-century castle
Dunlewey Centre		Dunlewey	Donegal	Ulster	Border	Historic house	website, includes historic tweed weaver's cottage
Dunsandle Castle		Athenry	Galway	Connacht	West	Historic house	15th-century castle
Elizabeth Fort		Cork	Cork	South-West	Munster	Military	17th century star-shaped fort used for military and law enforcement purposes
Elphin Windmill		Elphin	Roscommon	Connacht	West	Mill	information, restored 18th-century windmill, also Mill Cottage Agricultural Museum
EPIC The Irish Emigration Museum		Dublin	Dublin	Leinster	Dublin	Multiple	Dedicated to Irish emigration, housed in the restored vaults of a 19th-century warehouse in Dublin's Docklands
Emo Court		Emo	Laois	Leinster	Irish Midlands	Historic house	Late-18th-century mansion and gardens
Fairbrook House		Kilmeaden	Waterford	Munster	South-East	Art	website, contemporary figurative art and gardens
Famine Warhouse 1848		Ballingarry	County Tipperary	Munster	South-East	History	website, scene of the Young Irelander Rebellion of 1848
Farmleigh		Castleknock	Dublin	Leinster	Dublin	Historic house	Official Irish State Guest House, 19th-century mansion and gardens open for tours
Fethard Folk Farm and Transport Museum		Fethard	County Tipperary	Munster	South-East	Multiple	information, information, household items, vehicles, farm tools and equipment, folk life exhibits
Fort Dunree		Buncrana	Donegal	Ulster	Border	Military	Mostly 19th-century fort with military memorabilia and displays
Foxford Woollen Mills Visitor Centre		Foxford	Mayo	Connacht	West	Industry	information, includes tours of the operating mill, art galleries
Fr McDyer's Folk Village Museum		Glencolmcille	Donegal	Ulster	Border	Open air	website, thatched rural cottage village with replica furnished cottages from the 18th, 19th and early 20th centuries
Fr Murphy Centre		Boolavogue	Wexford	Leinster	South-East	Agriculture	website, restored 19th-century farmyard, earlier home of Father John Murphy, one of the leaders of the Irish Rebellion of 1798
Fr Patrick Peyton CSC Memorial Centre		Attymass	Mayo	Connacht	West	Religious	information, life and apostolic works of Reverend Father Patrick Peyton
Fox's Lane Museum		Youghal	Cork	Munster	South-West	History	website, evolution and development of household conveniences and appliances used in the home from the 1850s to the 1950s
Frye Model Railwyay		Malahide	Dublin	Leinster	Dublin	Railway	Located in Malahide Castle, collection of handmade models of Irish trains
GAA Museum		Dublin	Dublin	Leinster	Dublin	Sports	Located at Croke Park, history and contributions of the Gaelic Athletic Association
Galway City Museum		Galway	Galway	Connacht	West	Local	City's history, culture, trade, industry, military
Glasnevin Museum		Glasnevin	Dublin	Leinster	Dublin	History	Social, historical, political and artistic development of modern Ireland through the lives of the generations buried in Glasnevin Cemetery
Glebe House and Gallery		Letterkenny	Donegal	Ulster	Border	Art	website, early-19th-century Regency House decorated with William Morris textiles, Islamic and Japanese art, features the Derek Hill collection of works by leading 20th-century artists
Glengowla Mines		Oughterard	Galway	Connacht	West	Mining	website, 19th-century silver and lead mine
Glenveagh Castle		Churchill	Donegal	Ulster	Border	Historic house	19th-century castle and gardens
Glenview Folk Museum		Ballinamore	Leitrim	Connacht	Border	History	website, agriculture equipment and machinery, recreated shops and a pub, household artefacts
Famine Museum and Granuaile Visitor Centre		Louisburgh	Mayo	Connacht	West	History	information, life of 16th-century pirate queen Gráinne O'Malley, exhibits about the Great Famine in County Mayo
Greenan Farm Museums & Maze		Greenan	Wicklow	Leinster	Mid-East	Agriculture	website, working family farm, a barn museum with historic farming tools and equipment, a bottle museum with antique 19th- and early-20th-century Irish bottles, jars and vessels, and a 16th–17th-century-period farmhouse
Guinness Storehouse		Dublin	Dublin	Leinster	Dublin	Food	Brewing ingredients, process, brand history, memorabilia
Gurtnagrough Folk Museum		Ballydehob	Cork	Munster	South-West	History	information, rural life artefacts
Hennigan's Heritage Centre		Knock	Mayo	Connacht	West	Local	website, information, heritage of life of the Mayo area, farming, home, jobs and work, culture
Hillview Museum		Bagenalstown	Carlow	Leinster	South-East	History	information, household artifacts and vintage farm machinery
Hook Lighthouse		Fethard-on-Sea	Wexford	Leinster	South-East	Maritime	Visitor centre and guided tours of the lighthouse tower
Hunt Museum		Limerick	Limerick	Munster	Mid-West	Art	Fine art and antiquities dating from the Neolithic to the 20th century
Ionad Deirbhle		Aughleam	Mayo	Connacht	West	Local	information, also known as Eachléim Heritage Centre, local folklore, archaeology, history rural life, currach fishing, construction of old houses
Imaginosity, Dublin Children’s Museum		Sandyford	Dublin	Leinster	Dublin	Children's	website
Inishowen Maritime Museum		Greencastle	Donegal	Ulster	Border	Maritime	website, lifesaving, Malin Head Radio Station, fishing, seafaring, lighthouses, shipwrecks, naval history, planetarium
International Museum of Wine		Kinsale	Cork	Munster	South-West	History	Links between Ireland and the wine trade
Ireland's Historic Science Centre		Birr	Offaly	Leinster	Irish Midlands	Science	Located at Birr Castle, Ireland's historic scientists and their contributions to astronomy and botany
Irish Agricultural Museum		Johnstown Castle, Murrintown	Wexford	Leinster	South-East	Agriculture	Farming, famine and country life
Irish Fly Fishing and Game Shooting Museum		Attanagh	Laois	Leinster	Irish Midlands	Sports	information, information, vintage rods, reels, guns, tackle, tools and specimens of birds and fish
Irish Jewish Museum		Dublin	Dublin	Leinster	Dublin	Ethnic	Located in a former synagogue, history and culture of Ireland's Jewish communities
Irish Museum of Modern Art		Dublin	Dublin	Leinster	Dublin	Art	Modern and contemporary art, located at the Royal Hospital Kilmainham
Irish National Heritage Park		Wexford	Wexford	Leinster	South-East	Open air	Recreated homesteads, places of ritual, burial modes and remains
Irish National Stud		Celbridge	Kildare	Leinster	Mid-East	Sports	Includes the Horse Museum about horse racing in Ireland, Japanese gardens
Irish Rock N Roll Museum		Dublin	Dublin	Leinster	Temple Bar	Music	website, Irish musical icons and their recordings, vintage guitars and amplifiers, Thin Lizzy band
Jackie Clarke Library and Archives		Ballina	Mayo	Connacht	West	Library	website, under development, exhibits from its document collections of over 400 years of Irish history
James Joyce Centre		Dublin	Dublin	Leinster	Dublin	Literary	Life and works of author James Joyce
James Joyce Tower and Museum		Sandyford	Dublin	Leinster	Dublin	Literary	Life and works of author James Joyce
James Mitchell Geology Museum		Galway	Galway	Connacht	West	Natural history	website, part of Galway's University, rocks, minerals and fossils
Jeanie Johnston		Dublin	Dublin	Leinster	Dublin	Maritime	Replica of a 19th-century three-masted barque of the same name, exhibits about the Great Famine and immigration
Kennedy Homestead		New Ross	Wexford	Leinster	South-East	Historic house	website, birthplace of President John F. Kennedy's great-grandfather Patrick Kennedy
Kerry Bog Village Museum		Glenbeigh	Kerry	Munster	South-West	historic houses	website, historic houses/village and some animals
Kerry County Museum		Tralee	Kerry	Munster	South-West	Local	County history, culture, archaeology, explorer Tom Crean, medieval founding and life
Kilmainham Gaol		Kilmainham	Dublin	Leinster	Dublin	Prison	Historic former prison
Kilmore Quay Maritime Museum		Kilmore Quay	Wexford	Leinster	South-East	Maritime	information, housed on board the lightship Guillemot
Kiltartan Gregory Museum and Millennium Park		Gort	Galway	Connacht	West	Biographical	website, life of Isabella Augusta, Lady Gregory, local history
Kiltimagh Museum		Kiltimagh	Mayo	Connacht	West	Local	Local history and culture, located in a former railway station
King House		Boyle	Roscommon	Connacht	West	Historic house	website, early-18th-century Georgian mansion with audio-visual dioramas of local history
King John's Castle		Limerick	Limerick	Munster	Mid-West	Historic house	16th-century fortress
Knappogue Castle		Quin	Clare	Munster	Mid-West	Historic house	Medieval tower house and gardens
Knock Shrine		Knock	Mayo	Connacht	West	Religious	Major Roman Catholic pilgrimage site with museum about the Knock Apparition of 1879
Lackagh Museum And Heritage Park		Turloughmore	Galway	Connacht	West	Historic house	information, restored traditional Irish cottage, open by appointment
Lár na Páirce		Thurles	County Tipperary	Munster	Mid-West	Sports	website history of gaelic games
Lewis Glucksman Gallery		Cork	Cork	Munster	South-West	Art	Part of University College Cork
Lifetime Lab	Engines at the Old Cork Waterworks / Lifetime Lab	Cork	Cork	Munster	South-West	Technology	Former steam-powered waterworks, exhibits on water, waste, energy and nature
Lifford Courthouse		Lifford	Donegal	Ulster	Border	Prison	website, 18th- and 19th-century life in the courthouse and prison
Limerick City Gallery of Art		Limerick	Limerick	Munster	Mid-West	Art	Contemporary Irish art
Limerick City Museum		Limerick	Limerick	Munster	Mid-West	Local	Also known as Jim Kemmy Municipal Museum, city history, culture, industry
Lismore Castle		Lismore	Waterford	Munster	South-East	Art	Includes Lismore Castle Arts Gallery, gardens with contemporary sculpture
Lismore Heritage Centre		Lismore	Waterford	Munster	South-East	Local	website, local history, culture
Lissadell House			Sligo	Connacht	Border	Historic house	19th-century Regency-style house and gardens
The Little Museum of Dublin		Dublin	Dublin	Leinster	Dublin	Historic Building, History	A history of Dublin through artefacts, housed in a restored Georgian building on St. Stephen's Green
Lockes Distillery Museum		Kilbeggan	Westmeah	Leinster	Irish Midlands	Industry	Small pot still whiskey distillery
Lough Gur Visitors Centre		Bruff	Limerick	Munster	Mid-West	Archaeology	Pre-Celtic Stone age site with artefacts and replica dwellings
Malahide Castle		Malahide	Dublin	Leinster	Dublin	Historic house	
Marsh's Library		Dublin	Dublin	Leinster	Dublin	Library	Exhibits from its collections of 16th- to 18th-century medicine, law, science, travel, navigation, mathematics, music, surveying and classical literature
Mayo North Family Heritage Centre		Castlehill	Mayo	Connacht	West	Multiple	website, includes the Irish Heritage Centre Museum with local farm and household artefacts (also known as Enniscoe Museum), a family history research centre, and a forge and craft training centre
Michael Collins Centre		Clonakilty	Cork	Munster	South-West	Biographical	website, life and times of Michael Collins, leader of the IRA and later the Free State movement
Michael Davitt Museum		Straide	Mayo	Connacht	West	Biographical	information, life of 19th-century political leader Michael Davitt
Mill Museum		Tuam	Galway	Connacht	West	Mill	information, preserved corn mill and miller's house
Model Arts and Niland Gallery		Sligo	Sligo	Connacht	Border	Art	Contemporary arts centre
Monaghan County Museum		Monaghan	Monaghan	Ulster	Border	Local	County history, art, culture
Mountmellick Museum		Mountmellick	Laois	Leinster	Irish Midlands	Local	website, town's Quaker heritage, Mountmellick embroidery
Tara's Palace Museum of Childhood		Enniskerry	Wicklow	Leinster	Dublin	Toy	Located in Powerscourt House, 22 room doll's palace, collection of historic dolls houses
Muckross House		Killarney	Kerry	Munster	South-West	Open air	Includes the 19th-century Victorian-period mansion, 1930–40s-period heritage farms, Victorian garden
Museum of Country Life		Castlebar	Mayo	Connacht	West	History	Rural way of life of the Irish people between 1850 and 1950; part of the National Museum of Ireland
Museum of Literature Ireland (MoLi)		Dublin	Dublin	Leinster	Dublin	Irish Literature	Museum Website, Exhibitions on Irish writing
Museum of the Master Saddler		Corlough	Cavan	Ulster	Border	Industry	website, saddle and harness-making
Museum of Style Icons		Newbridge	Kildare	Leinster	Mid-East	Irish Literature	Clothing and other memoribilia associated with Hollywood stars and other celebrities
National 1798 Rebellion Centre		Enniscorthy	Wexford	Leinster	South-East	History	website, history and aftermath of the Irish Rebellion of 1798
National Gallery of Ireland		Dublin	Dublin	Leinster	Dublin	Art	Irish and European art
Natural History Museum		Dublin	Dublin	Leinster	Dublin	Natural history	Victorian-period cases of Irish mammals, birds, reptiles, fish, invertebrates and microbes; part of the National Museum of Ireland
National Leprechaun Museum		Dublin	Dublin	Leinster	Dublin	Culture	Irish folklore, mythology and story-telling, featuring not only the leprechaun, but many Irish characters and heroes from Irish culture.
National Library of Ireland		Dublin	Dublin	Leinster	Dublin	Library	Exhibits from its collections of historic documents
National Maritime Museum of Ireland		Dún Laoghaire	Dublin	Leinster	Dublin	Maritime	Ireland's maritime heritage
National Museum of Ireland – Archaeology		Dublin	Dublin	Leinster	Dublin	Archaeology	Prehistoric Ireland, church treasures, Viking and medieval periods, items from Egypt, Cyprus, and the Roman world; part of the National Museum of Ireland
National Museum of Ireland – Decorative Arts and History		Dublin	Dublin	Leinster	Dublin	Multiple	Weaponry, furniture, silver, ceramics, glassware, folk artefacts, coins and currency, costumes; part of the National Museum of Ireland
National Photographic Archive		Dublin	Dublin	Leinster	Dublin	Library	Exhibits of photography from its collections
National Print Museum of Ireland		Dublin	Dublin	Leinster	Dublin	Art	Exhibits of contemporary and history printed art and documents, features historic printing presses
National Science Museum at Maynooth		Maynooth	County Kildare	Leinster	Mid-East Region, Ireland		Displays of Scientific instruments. http://museum.maynoothcollege.ie
National Transport Museum of Ireland		Howth	Dublin	Leinster	Dublin	Transportation	Public service and commercial road transport vehicles
National Wax Museum		Dublin	Dublin	Leinster	Dublin	Wax	Irish history and cultural figures
Newtownbarry House		Bunclody	Wexford	Leinster	South-East	Historic house	website, 19th-century country house and gardens, art gallery
Newmills Corn and Flax Mills		Milltown	Donegal	Ulster	Border	Agriculture	Working watermill
Nora Barnacle House		Galway	Galway	Connacht	West	Historic house	website, information, late-19th- to early-20th-century cottage family home of Nora Barnacle, wife of author James Joyce
Number Twenty Nine - Georgian House Museum		Dublin	Dublin	Leinster	Dublin	Historic house	website, late-18th-century Georgian era house
Ormonde Castle		Carrick-on-Suir	County Tipperary	Munster	South-East	Historic house	Tudor manor house
Parke's Castle			Leitrim	Connacht	Border	Historic house	Restored early-17th-century plantation castle
Patrick Kavanagh Centre		Inniskeen	Monaghan	Ulster	Border	Literary	Life and works of poet Patrick Kavanagh
Patrick Pearse's Cottage		Rosmuc	Galway	Connacht	West	Biographical	website, restored summer residence and school of Patrick Pearse, leader of the 1916 Easter Rising
Partry House		Partry	Mayo	Connacht	West	Historic house	information, 17th-century house, farm and gardens
Pearse Museum		Rathfarnham	Dublin	Leinster	Dublin	Natural history	Irish plants and animals, educators and naturalists Patrick Pearse and his brother, William
Phoenix Park Visitor Centre		Dublin	Dublin	Leinster	Dublin	Local	History of the park and the area, including Ashtown Castle
Photo Museum Ireland		Dublin	Dublin	Leinster	Dublin	Art	website, contemporary photography
Poet's Cottage		Camross	Laois	Leinster	Irish Midlands	Historic house	information, information
Portumna Castle		Portumna	Galway	Connacht	West	Historic house	17th-century house under restoration, features the Wild Geese Heritage Museum about the 17th century Flight of the Wild Geese
Project Arts Centre		Dublin	Dublin	Leinster	Dublin	Art	Multidisciplinary contemporary arts centre
Quiet Man Cottage Museum		Cong	Mayo	Connacht	West	Media	information, replica of the 1920s period cottage in the 1952 movie The Quiet Man, memorabilia of the filming of the movie
Radio Museum Experience		Cork	Cork	Munster	South-West	Technology	website, located in the Cork City Gaol, historic radio equipment, restored 6CK Radio Broadcasting Studio, history of Guglielmo Marconi and his Irish connections
Rathfarnham Castle		Rathfarnham	Dublin	Leinster	Dublin	Historic house	16th-century castle
Redwood Castle		Lorrha	County Tipperary	Munster	Mid-West	Historic house	Medieval tower castle house
Rock of Cashel		Carrick-on-Suir	County Tipperary	Munster	South-East	Historic house	Medieval fortress castle and cathedral remains
Roscommon County Museum		Roscommon	Roscommon	Connacht	West	Local	Local history and culture
Ross Castle		Killarney	Kerry	Munster	South-West	Historic house	Medieval Chieftain's stronghold
Rothe House		Kilkenny	Kilkenny	Leinster	Dublin	Local	Geology, archaeology, history of Kilkenny, operated by Kilkenny Archaeological Society
Royal Hibernian Academy		Dublin	Dublin	Leinster	Dublin	Art	Exhibits of contemporary art
Russborough House		Blessington	Wicklow	Leinster	Mid-East	Historic house	Large 18th-century house with fine art collection, fine furniture, tapestries, carpets, porcelain, silver
Science Gallery		Dublin	Dublin	Leinster	Dublin	Science	Part of Trinity College
Sheep and Wool Centre		Leenane	Galway	Connacht	West	Industry	website, local textile industry, spinning, weaving, sheep raising
Skibbereen Heritage Centre		Skibbereen	Cork	Munster	South-West	Local	website, local history, impact of the Great Famine, natural history of Lough Hyne
Sligo Abbey		Sligo	Sligo	Connacht	Border	Religious	Ruins of a medieval abbey
Sligo County Museum		Sligo	Sligo	Connacht	Border	Local	County history and culture
Sligo Folk Park		Riverstown	Sligo	Connacht	Border	Open air	website, rural history and agricultural artefacts, 19th-century-period house, recreated village streetscape with shops and services
South Tipperary County Museum		Clonmel	County Tipperary	Munster	South-East	Multiple	website, art exhibits, county history, culture, natural history, archaeology
St. Connell's Museum		Glenties	Donegal	Ulster	Local	Border	Local history and culture, the Great Famine, prison cells of the late-19th-century courthouse, artefacts of the County Donegal Railways Joint Committee
St. Kilian's Heritage Centre		Mullagh	Cavan	Ulster	Border	Religious	information, life, work, martyrdom and cult of Saint Kilian, a 7th-century saint born in Mullagh
St. Mullins Heritage Centre		St Mullin's	Carlow	Leinster	South-East	Local	website, local history
Stradbally Steam Museum		Stradbally	Laois	Leinster	Irish Midlands	Transport	website, steam, fire and farm engines
National Famine Museum & Strokestown Park		Strokestown	Roscommon	Connacht	West	Historic house	Restored 18th-century mansion, museum commemorating the Great Famine of 1845, walled garden
Swiss Cottage		Cahir	County Tipperary	Munster	South-East	Historic house	Early-19th-century thatched ornamental cottage
Thomas Dillon's Claddagh Gold Museum		Galway	Galway	Connacht	West	Multiple	website, historic Claddagh rings, photographs of local history
Thoor Ballylee		Gort	Galway	Connacht	West	Literary	Norman tower summer home of author W. B. Yeats
Thurles Famine and War Museum		Thurles	County Tipperary	Munster	Mid-West	Multiple	website Great Famine, war
Tipperary Agricultural and Heritage Museum		Golden	County Tipperary	Munster	South-East	Local	Also known as the Maher Farm Machinery Museum. Contains exhibits and artifacts covering Irish countryside life from the latter half of the 19th Century up to the late 20th Century. Indoor and outdoor display areas. Officially opened on the 7th of July, 2013. Museum Facebook page is here. Website here.
Tullow Museum		Tullow	Carlow	Leinster	South-East	Local	website, local history
Waterford County Museum		Dungarvan	Waterford	Munster	South-East	Local	website, local history, culture
Waterford Museum of Treasures		Waterford	Waterford	Munster	South-East	Local	City history, culture, archaeology, Viking and medieval heritage, ethnic, cultural and religious diversity
Waterways Ireland Visitor Centre		Dublin	Dublin	Leinster	Dublin	Maritime	website, heritage of Ireland's waterways
West Cork Regional Museum		Clonakilty	Cork	Munster	South-West	Local	information, local history
Westport House		Westport	Mayo	Connacht	West	Historic house	18th-century stately home with original contents, gardens
Wexford County Museum		Enniscorthy	Wexford	Leinster	South-East	Local	information, located in Enniscorthy Castle, county history and culture
Wicklow's Historic Gaol		Wicklow	Wicklow	Leinster	Mid-East	Prison	website, 18th-century prison
Ye Olde Hurdy Gurdy Museum of Vintage Radio		Howth	Dublin	Leinster	Dublin	Technology	website, vintage radios, music boxes, gramophones and other related items
Yeats Memorial Building		Sligo	Sligo	Connacht	Border	Biographical	website, exhibition on poet W. B. Yeats

== Defunct museums ==
- Bank of Ireland Arts Centre, Dublin
- Dublin Civic Museum, closed in 2003
- Museum of Irish Industry, Dublin, closed in 1866
- Sligo Art Gallery, closed 2010

== See also ==
- List of museums in Northern Ireland
- List of historical societies in Ireland
