= County Carlow Military Museum =

- Iarsmalinn Mhíleata Chontae Cheatharlach
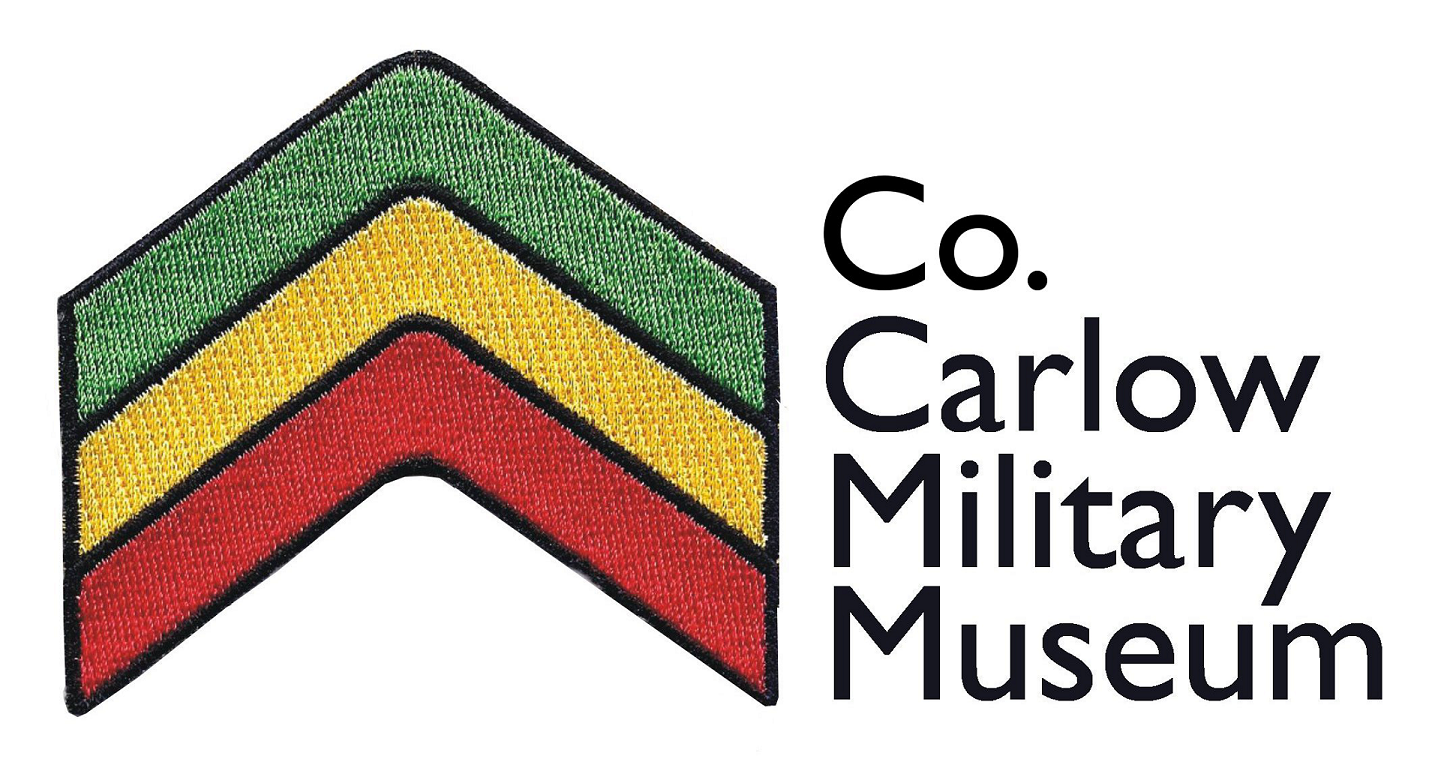

- Location within Ireland
- Established: 1995
- Location: Athy Road, Carlow, Ireland
- Coordinates: 52°50′36″N 6°55′43″W
- Type: Military museum
- Curator: Paul Maguire
- Website: carlowmilitarymuseum.org

County Carlow Military Museum (Irish: Iarsmalinn Mhíleata Chontae Cheatharlach) is a museum dedicated to the military history of County Carlow and its people. It is located in the former church on the grounds of St. Dympna's Hospital in Carlow town.

== History ==
The County Carlow Military Museum was founded in 1995, and was originally based in the Carlow town FCA Headquarters, opening in 1996. The impetus for the museum's foundation was the death of local man and soldier Donie Cunnigham in a helicopter crash in 1995. The displays began with his uniform as a memorial, and the collections expanded from there. The museum and its collections moved to the church building at St. Dympna’s Hospital in 2001. The building dates from the 19th century, and contains stained glass by German artist August Weckbecker.

== Contents ==
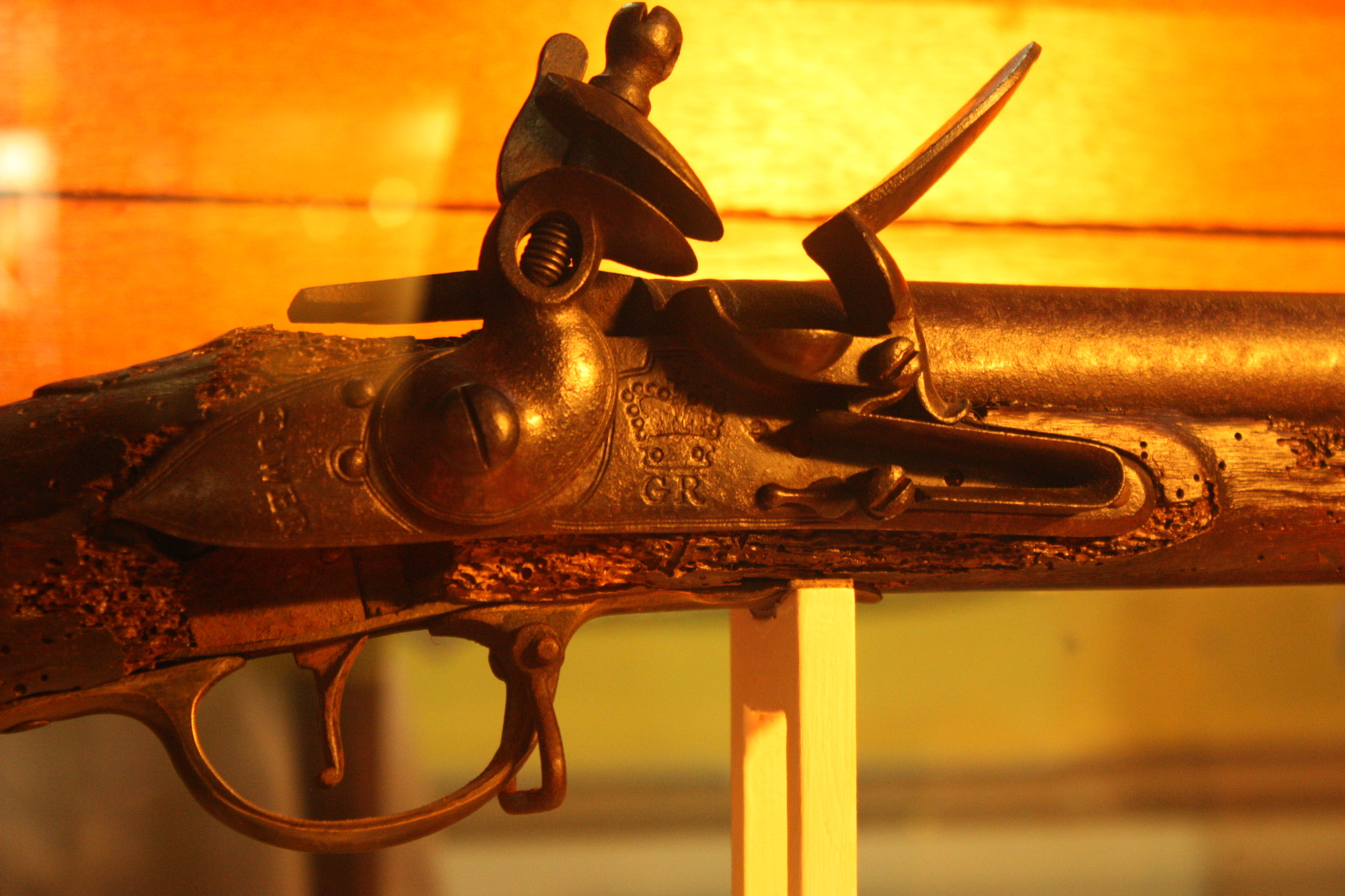
Brown Bess musket on display in County Carlow Military Museum.

A large proportion of the museum's collections comprises material related to the Irish Defence Forces, with a number of uniforms displayed from the Defence Forces starting from the foundation of the state and ending with uniforms currently in use. There are also displays detailing Carlow's involvement in the Irish War of Independence and Irish Civil War. The exhibitions also detail the Irish involvement in United Nations peacekeeping, on mission to Congo, Lebanon and Somalia.

A full-scale replica World War I trench has been built as part of the displays on the Irish involvement in the War, as from County Carlow over 500 men were killed and 2000 injured in the war. Other objects featured pertain different military corps with connections to Carlow, such as the Drums of the 8th Militia Battalion King’s Royal Rifle Corps.

Many Carlow people who went abroad as soldiers are featured in the display, such as Myles Keogh from Leighlinbridge.

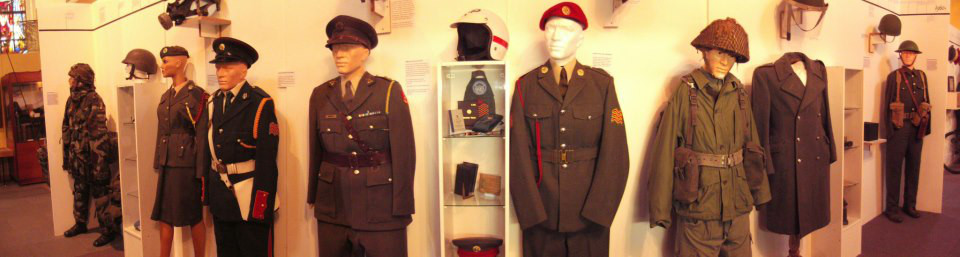
A section of the Defence Forces (Ireland) display in County Carlow Military Museum.

There is another display entailing both Carlovian and international involvement in World War II.

A display has also been put together detailing medieval Carlow, including reproduction suits of Medieval armor and arms. In 2013 a scale model of Carlow Castle was unveiled as part of this display.

The museum also contains a display entailing Carlow's involvement in the Irish Rebellion of 1798 featuring replica uniforms and weapons, along with original artifacts from the period, such as an original Brown Bess musket.
