= Sligo County Museum =

- Músaem Chontae Shligigh
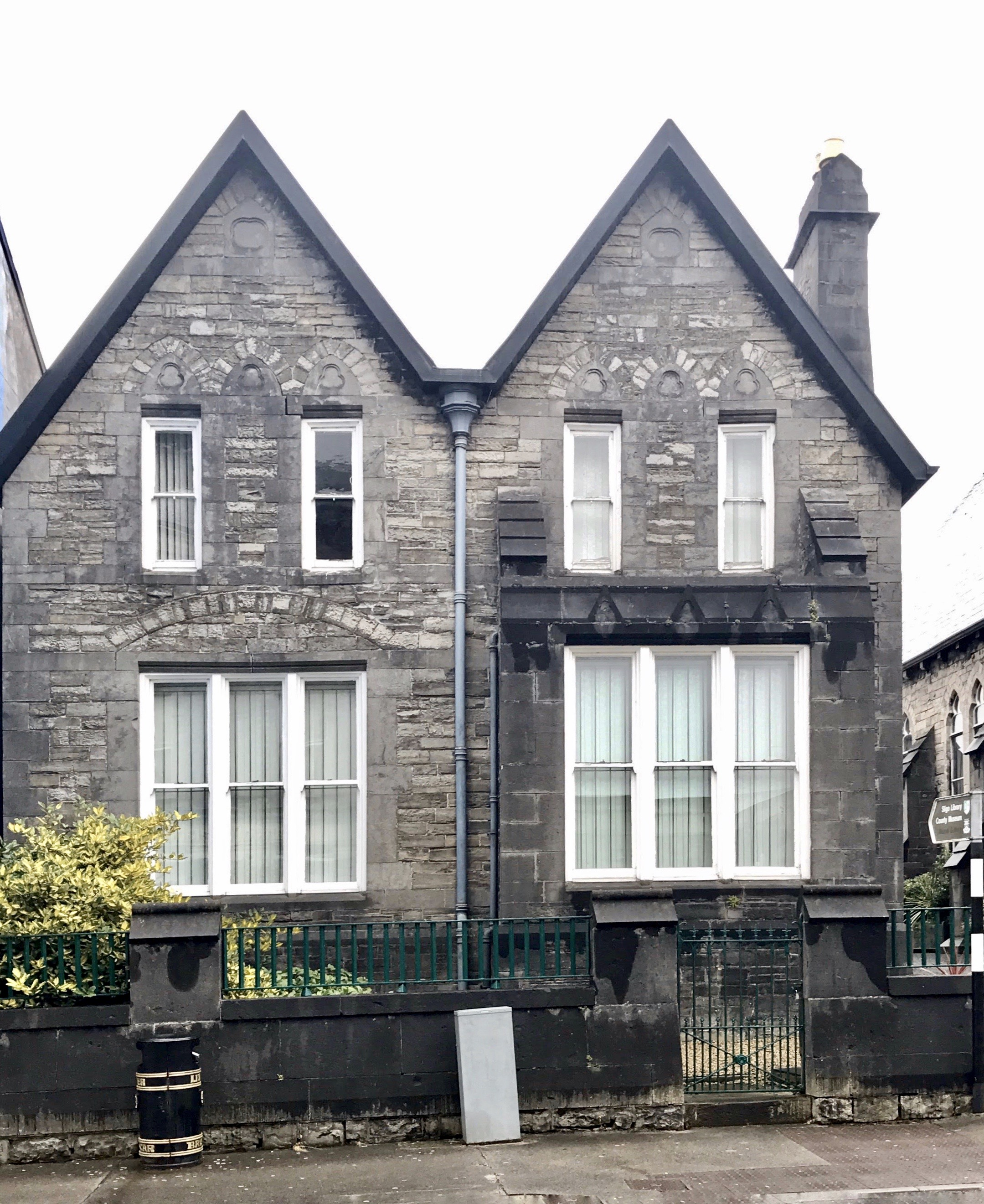
- Established: 1955
- Location: Stephen Street, Sligo, Ireland
- Coordinates: 54.27257°N 8.47275°W
- Type: County museum
- Public transit access: Markievicz Road bus shelter
- Website: www.sligoarts.ie/VenuesProfile/SligoCountyMuseum/

Sligo County Museum (Irish: Músaem Chontae Shligigh) is a museum dedicated to the history of County Sligo. The museum is housed in a former manse on Stephen Street, Sligo town.

== History ==
Sligo County Museum was opened in 1955, and is housed in a former manse building which was converted for use as a museum. The manse, a building traditionally used a residence for clergymen, is linked to the establishment of the Congregational church in Sligo and was built around 1867. Adjoining this manse is a gothic Presbyterian church, which has been used as the Sligo Library since 1954. Nora Niland, for whom the Niland Collection is named, aided in the creation of the museum, in particular the Yeats Collection.

== Contents ==
The collections cover the history of County Sligo from the stone age to present day. One of the most notable antiquities is a firkin of bog butter which is over 100 years old. As Sligo has long been associated with W. B. Yeats, the museum has a number of exhibits dedicated to the writer, such as a replica of his 1923 Nobel Prize in Literature and works from 1889 to 1936. The exhibitions feature some paintings from Jack Butler Yeats, George William Russell, and Seán Keating. Objects associated with Countess Markievicz and her sister, Eva Gore-Booth, are also displayed. There are numerous local artefacts and geological samples are on display. More recently the exhibitions featured a display called News from the Past chronicling Sligo's World War I history. A collection of photographs from World War I, which has been saved from destruction by a local man in the 1990s, was part of that display.

== New Museum ==
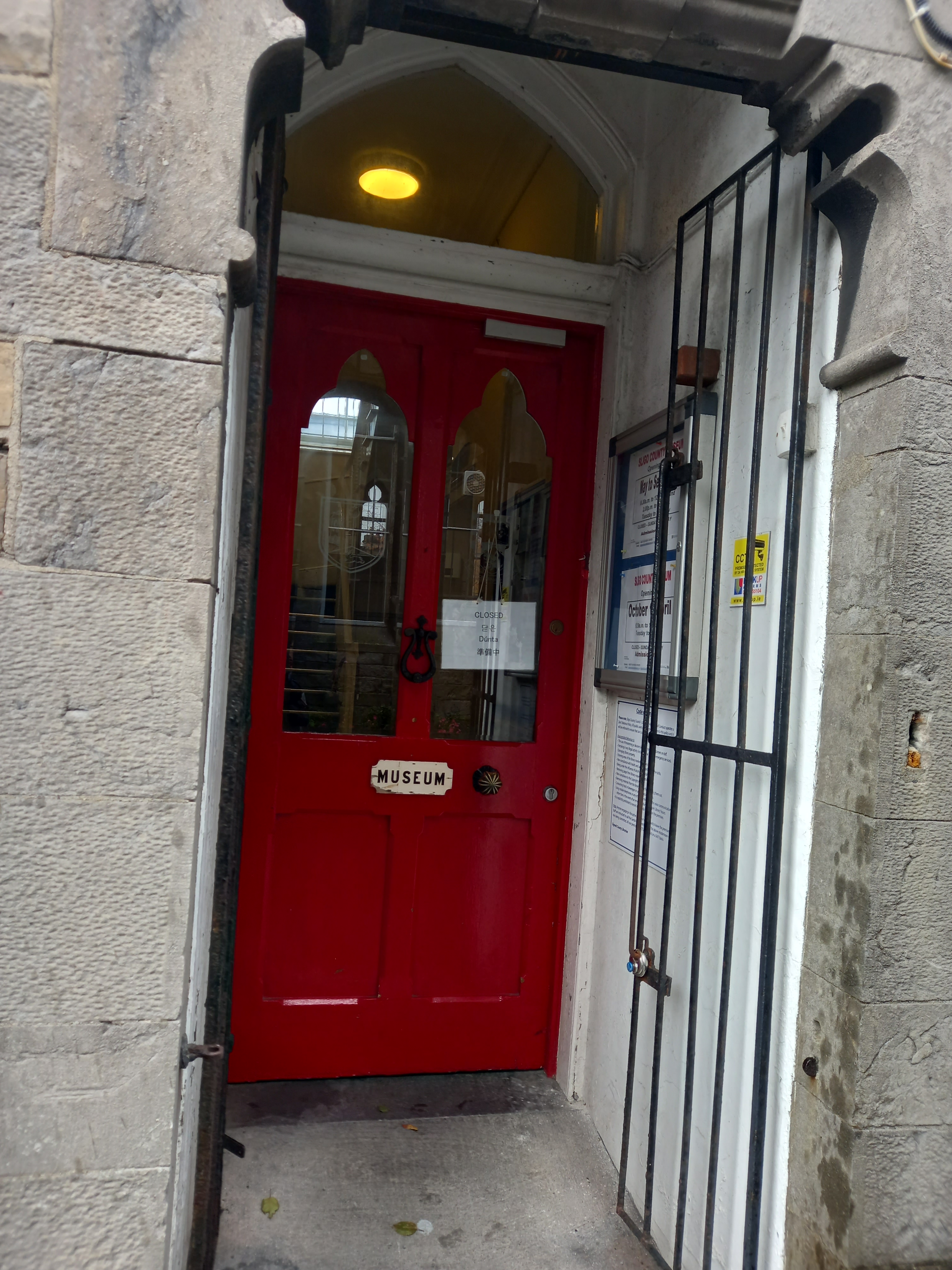
Museum entrance door

A new museum was planned and designed in 2001. In 2002 the museum service finalised plans for the new County Museum. The County Museum made strides in 2002 to improve upon its collection of artefacts with the purchase of furniture from the Lissadell House clearance sale. Phase 1 was to consist of the new Sligo Branch Library and Headquarters and the County Museum. A sum of €4.285m was approved by the Dept. of the Environment towards the new Sligo Branch Library and headquarters for Sligo town. An Access grant was also successful and 2,920,398 was awarded towards the new museum project in 2001. The tender competition was issued in October 2007. A loan of 6.4 million euro was requested by Sligo County Council in 2008.

Architects Sheridan Woods designed the building to the highest international standards. Construction began in 2008 under contractor Kilcawley Construction and was abandoned after groundworks were completed.
