= Nora Niland =

- Born: 21 March 1912; Ballinastack, Tuam, County Galway, Ireland
- Died: 29 December 1988 (aged 76); Dublin, Ireland
- Occupations: Librarian, arts administrator

Nora Niland (21 March 1912 – 29 December 1988) was the County Librarian of Sligo and the founder of the Sligo municipal art collection.

== Biography ==
Niland was born in 1912, the eighth child of the six sons and three daughters of John Niland and Elizabeth Loughlin of Ballinastack, Tuam, County Galway. She earned a bachelor's degree at University College Galway in 1943.

Niland worked in the Galway public library system from 1933 to 1943. In 1945 she became Sligo County Librarian. She oversaw the expansion of the library when it moved into three buildings on Stephen Street in the 1950s. She opened the Sligo County Museum in 1955, and added works by Jack B. Yeats to the collection in 1957. In 1956 she traveled in the eastern United States assessing library collections for Irish literature holdings. She helped to organize the first International Yeats Summer School in Sligo in 1959, and was a founding member of the Yeats Society Sligo.

Upon her retirement she returned to live in Ballinastack. She died at St. James's Hospital, Dublin, in 1988, at the age of 76.

== Niland Collection ==
The Niland Collection is the name of Sligo's Municipal Art Collection. Named after Niland, who began the collection in the 1950s, it has since grown to over 300 works and is cared for by, and displayed at, The Model in Sligo, Ireland. The collection was begun by Niland when she borrowed five works by Jack Butler Yeats to exhibit for the duration of the first Yeats Summer School in 1959. She built the collection over the years, with "vision, energy, forceful diplomacy, and abounding love of Sligo", and often with donations.

In 1998, on the tenth anniversary of her death, the gallery was moved to what had been the Model School on the Mall, Sligo and renamed in her honour as ‘The Model and Niland Gallery’. In 2009 it was renamed again to ‘The Model: Home of the Niland Collection’ (though this decision was criticized). In 2023, there was an exhibit titled "Nora Niland: A Collector's Eye" held at the gallery. The 2023 exhibit included a new portrait of Niland. The Yeats Society Sligo hosts an annual Nora Niland Lecture.
