= August Weckbecker =

German painter

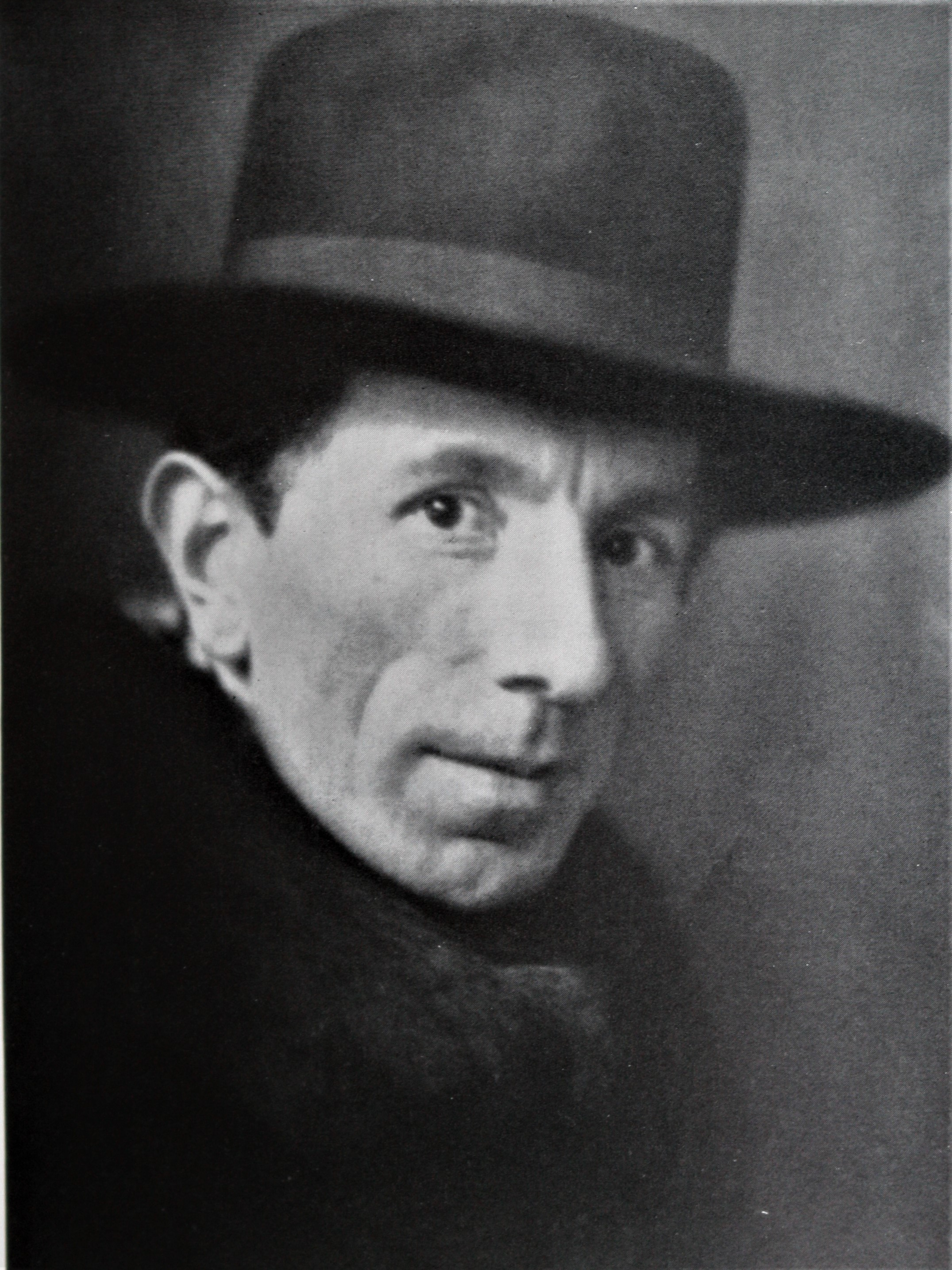
- Weckbecker circa 1938
- Born: 28 May 1888; Münstermaifeld, Germany
- Died: 12 September 1939 (aged 51); Munich

August Weckbecker (28 May 1888 – 13 September 1939) was a German sculptor, painter and stained-glass artist.

== Life ==
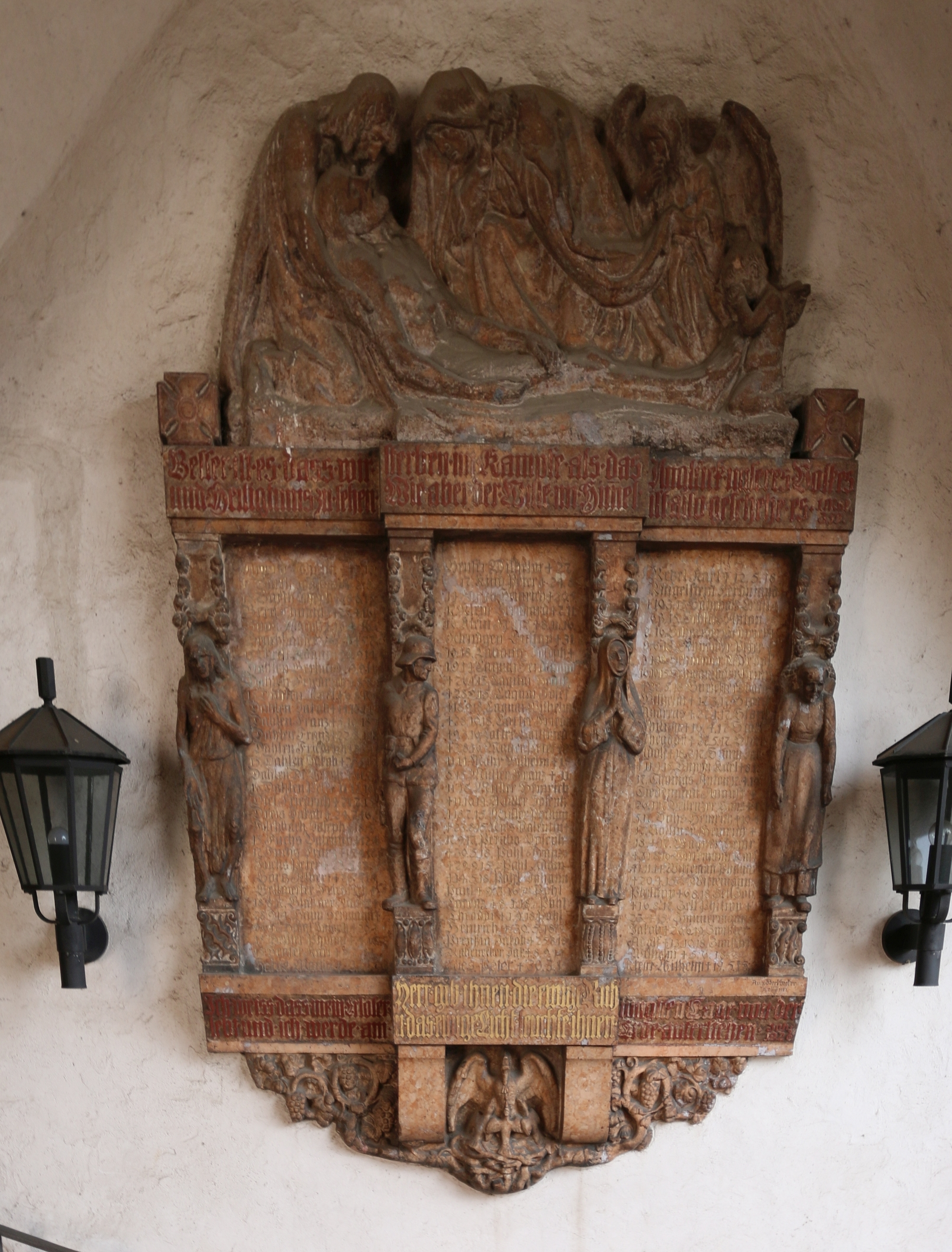
Work by Weckbecker in the church St. Martin, Lorch, Rheingau

August Weckbecker was born on 28 May 1888 in Münstermaifeld, Germany. By 1917 he was a Professor of sculpture in Munich. As a painter and sculptor, Weckbecker received commissions from King Alfonso of Spain, King Ludwig of Bavaria, Pope Benedict XV and Pope Pius XI.

In 1925 the Rev. Michael Bolger invited Weckbecker to County Carlow, Ireland to create a monument for the grave of the Rev. Hugh Cullen at Killeshin churchyard. He appears to have remained in Carlow for a number of years, going on to design the stations of the cross, a relief of the entombment of Christ, the East Window, two murals, and the tabernacle for the church at the Carlow lunatic asylum, now known as St Dympna's Hospital. The National Gallery of Ireland hold a bronze bust of Roger Casement by Weckbecker, along with its plaster study.

Weckbecker died in Munich on 13 September 1939.
