= Quiet Man Cottage Museum =

Irish Museum

Coordinates: 53°32′27″N 9°17′17″W

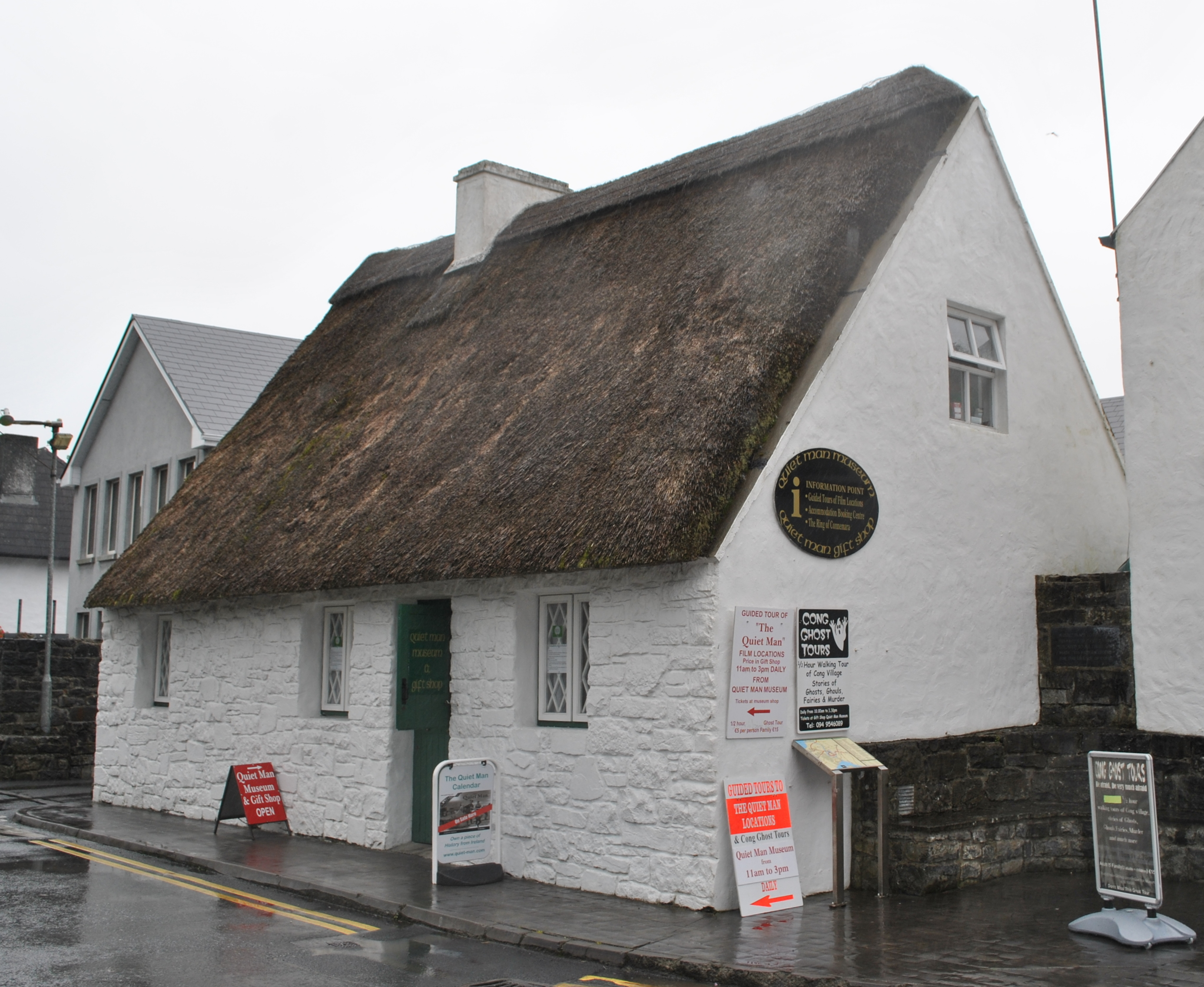
- Location: Cong, County Mayo, Ireland
- Website: www.quietmanmuseum.com

The Quiet Man Cottage Museum is a museum located in Cong, County Mayo, Ireland. It is a replica of the cottage used in John Ford's 1951 film The Quiet Man starring John Wayne, Maureen O'Hara and Barry Fitzgerald. It is typical of the Irish cottage of the 1820s featuring a thatched roof with an emerald green half door and whitewashed facade.

The ground floor of the "'White-o-Morn' Cottage" has been reproduced as an identical replica of the original Hollywood film set. Much care was taken to accurately replicate the furnishings, artifacts and costumes on display. These items include the table and chairs, and four-poster bed, so appreciated by Mary Kate Danaher, the character played by Maureen O'Hara.

The museum houses a large collection of newspaper cuttings from 1951 that recount what life was like when Hollywood descended on Cong. The costumes on display were made by the same company who made the original ones for the film: O'Maille's of Galway.

== White-o-Morn' Cottage ==
The original White-o-Mornin' Cottage is now in ruins. It was bought by Greg Ebbitt, a Canadian Californian resident, who intended to restore the cottage but since then attempts to raise the funds have been unsuccessful and the cottage continues to deteriorate despite being on the Galway County Council's Record of Protected Structures.

== Gallery ==
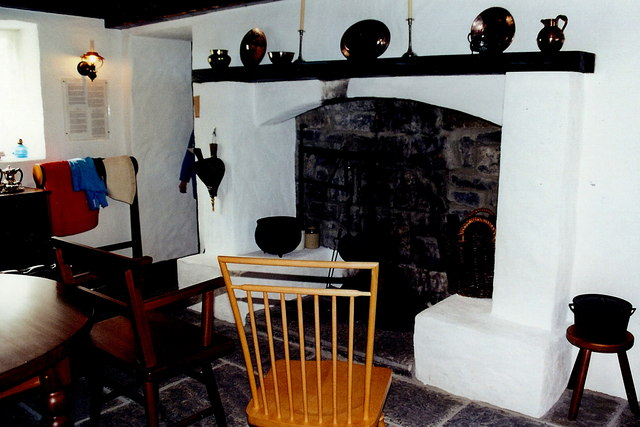
Hearth

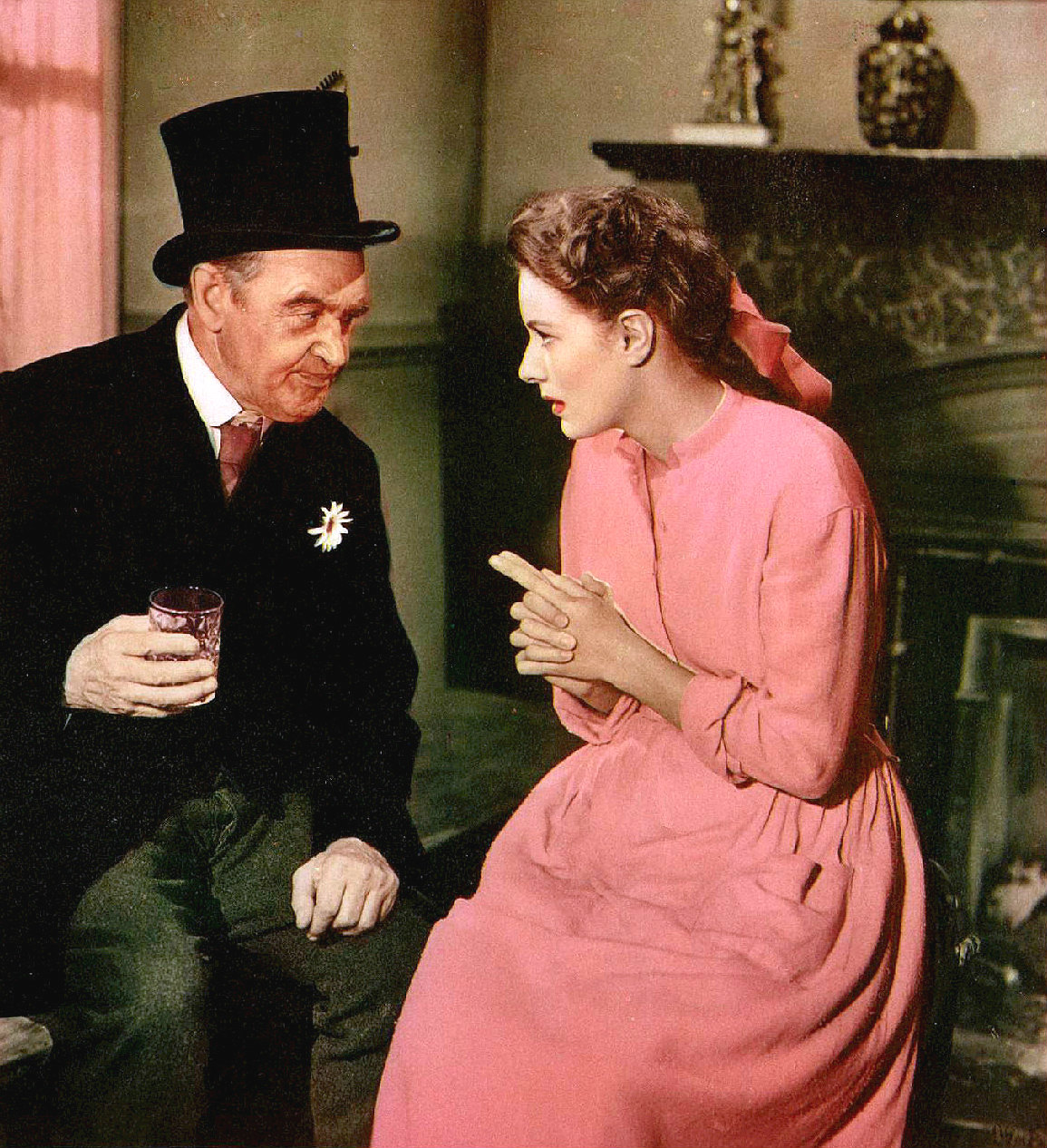
Maureen O'Hara & Barry Fitzgerald in the original Hollywood kitchen set

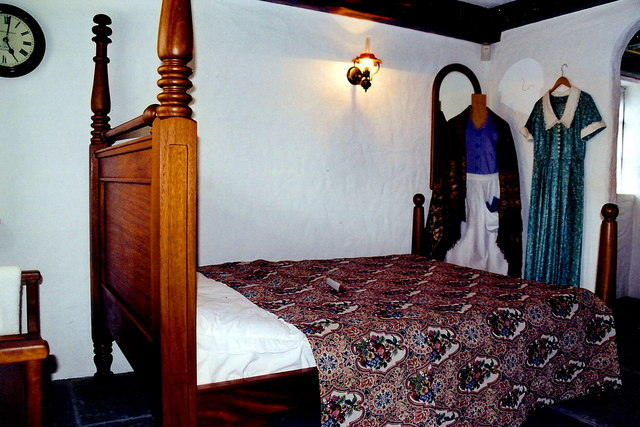
Bedroom
