= Cork Waterworks =

Historic building in Cork, Ireland

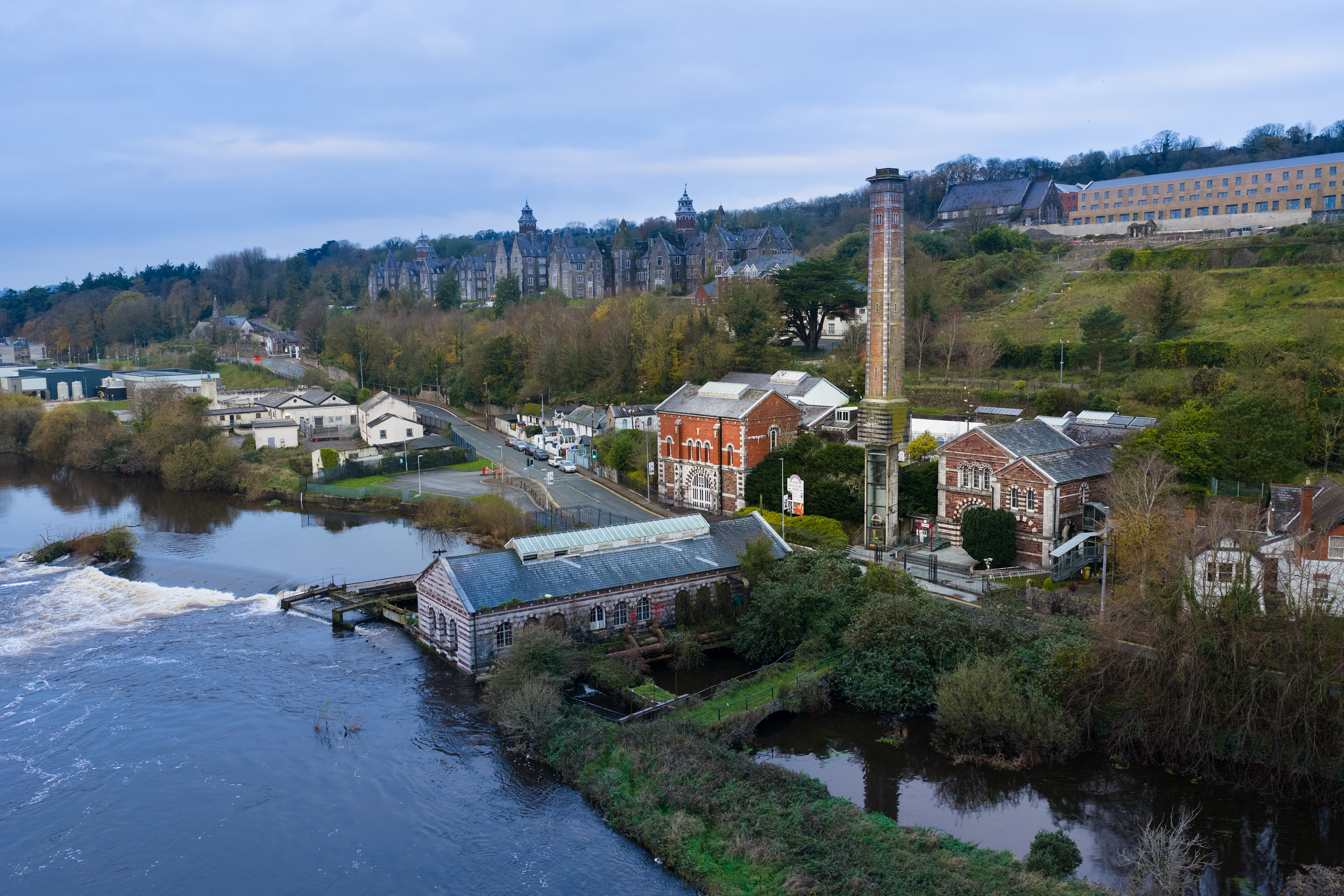
- View on the waterworks from south-east

- Location within Ireland

General information
- Status: Historic building
- Type: Waterworks
- Location: Cork, Ireland
- Coordinates: 51.8951°N 8.5092°W
- Completed: 1768

Cork Waterworks, also referred to today as Old Cork Waterworks, is an 18th-century waterworks building by the River Lee in Cork, Ireland. The building served as a water-pumping and supply facility in Victorian times and later opened to visitors as Lifetime Lab and the Old Cork Waterworks Experience.

== History ==
The site for Cork city's first water supply scheme, Cork Waterworks, was chosen by the architect Davis Ducart in 1762, and — following the establishment of the Cork Pipe Water Company — the construction in its first form was completed in 1768. The person supervising the works was Nicholas Fitton, and the stone commemorating Cork's first pump house was built into the wall of the presently existing turbine house, with the inscription "Cork Pipewater Company Established 1768". The main chimney stack dates back to 1858, and the turbine house to 1888.

Initially, the waterworks provided water to wealthy citizens at a cost of two guineas a year. That first system was based on a wooden water wheel, open storage tanks called the "City Basin", and a network of wooden pipes. Less privileged citizens could avail of public fountains and cisterns, but they were poorly maintained. In 1852, Cork Corporation began the process of buying out the company, and five years later Sir John Benson was commissioned to design a new facility to supply water to all citizens. Benson installed two Forneyron turbines, and a 90-horsepower Cornish steam engine. Wooden pipes were replaced with cast iron ones. Within a few years of Benson's innovations, plumbing was installed in many more city houses, and there were as many as 125 public fountains and taps installed across the city. That progress was accompanied by water wastefulness attributed to the lack of public awareness; it was estimated that an average citizen consumed 50 gallons of water per day, which was almost twice as much as necessary.

Based on a report delivered in 1861, there were defects in the execution of Benson's innovations, including leaking reservoirs and the failing Cornish engine. Benson, who at that time was also working on multiple other projects as the City Engineer and Harbour Engineer, including the construction of St. Patrick's Bridge, as well as engaging in private practice, was criticised for not devoting enough time to the waterworks. When faced with accusations, he never admitted blame, but did agree to part with Cork Corporation after completing the bridge and repairs to the reservoirs. John Arnott was appointed to take over the management of the waterworks.

The facility was upgraded with two 40 hp Boulton and Watt rotative beam engines in 1863 and a 38 hp horizontal engine in 1869.

By 1890, a new custom turbine house was built to host newer "American" turbines. There were total four of them operating by 1901.

Between 1904 and 1907, the facility was upgraded again, when three inverted triple expansion engines and a Lancashire boiler were installed. These were used until the late 1950s, and remain on the site today.

Before its normal operation was shut down, the Cork Waterworks were the oldest continuously used municipal water supply in the country, operating from their establishment in the 1760s until they were moved across the road in late 20th century. Until renovations began, the facility was in an abandoned state.

== Modern developments ==
When surveyed in 1999, in the context of Cork's historic industrial landscape, alongside Beamish & Crawford, Ballincollig Mills, etc., the Corporation Waterworks was one of the sites with the richest surviving assemblage of historical machinery and buildings.

In 2004, a plan was approved to transform the site's four main buildings to a heritage site with tourist, educational and industrial significance, with its own electricity supply. The cost of the undertaking was estimated at 8.5 million euro, the largest part of which was aided by EU financing. The project saw involvement from the Cork City Council, architects, industrial archeologists, and academic representatives from University College Cork. The project, named Lifetime Lab, involved restoration and conservation works to open a new visitor centre. Commenced in August 2004 and completed in 2006, the project included repairs to the sites stonework and woodwork, as well as the installation geothermal heat pumps for space heating, solar water heating panels, and photovoltaic electricity generation for display lighting. In the first year of its operation (2006), more than 8,000 people visited Lifetime Lab, most of which were school children.

In 2018, following additional investment from the City Council and Fáilte Ireland, the existing visitor venue called Lifetime Lab was rebranded to the Old Cork Waterworks Experience.

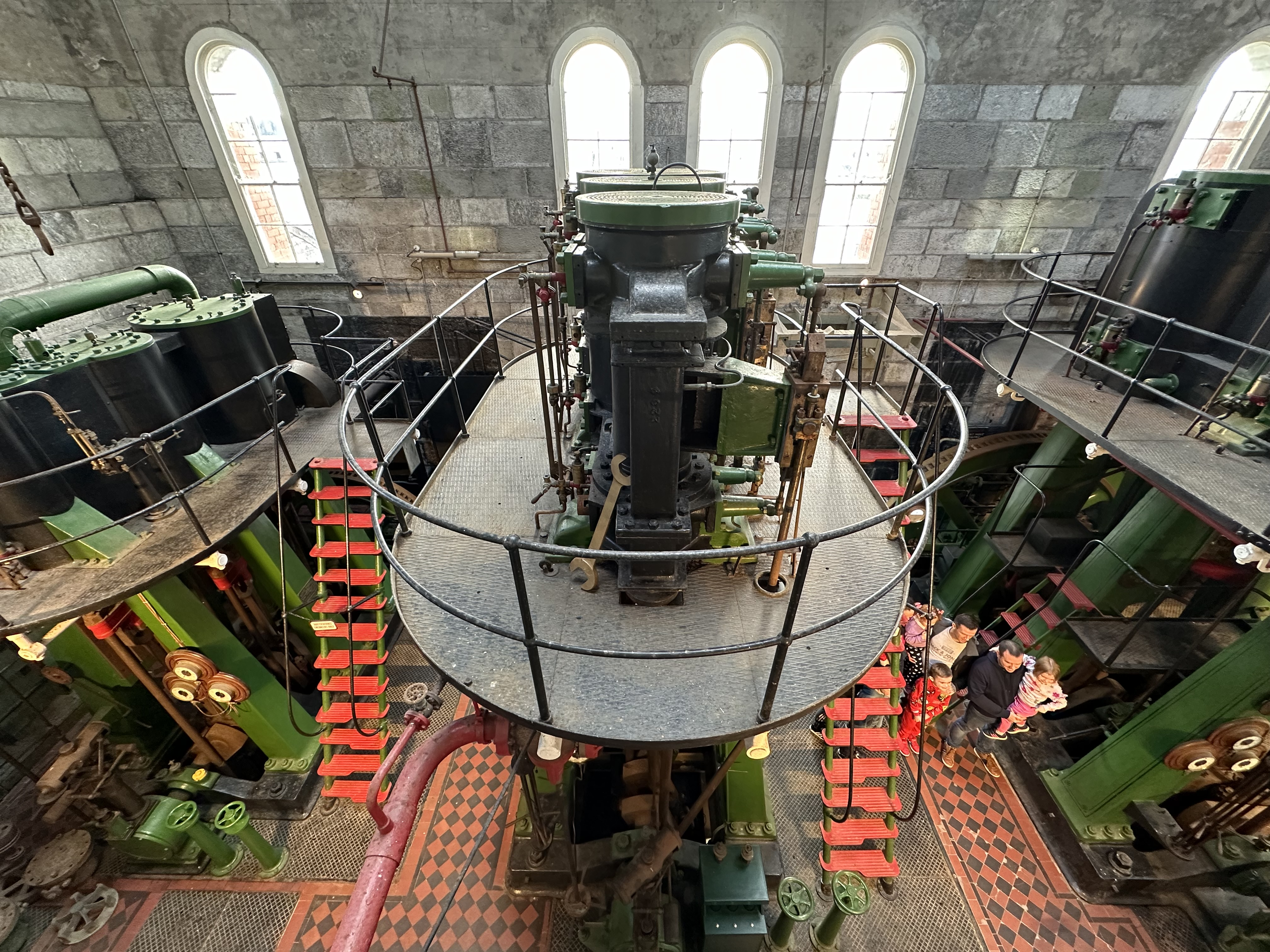
Three inverted triple expansion engines in the engine room

== Design ==
The complex is situated by the river Lee, close to where the river bifurcates before enclosing Cork's city center, and far enough from the Cork Harbour to be unaffected by its tidal reach and contamination from the city. The location is also suitable for geological reasons due to the presence of well-drained, permeable deposits. The facility includes a steam engine building, a boiler house, and several auxiliary buildings. The Victorian-era building's distinguished features include a 33-meter chimney, and sandstone and limestone archways. The large chimney is the only decorated engine chimney stack of its type to survive in Ireland. It was built using local brick, and ornamented with cut stones and grey and white striped quoin stones.

The engine house, built in 1907, contains engines by Coombe, Barbour from Belfast, the only remaining examples in Ireland.

Water was pumped to terraced reservoirs situated right above the site, and later also much further up in Shanakiel and Knocknaheeny areas, from where it was distributed to public pumps and fountains in the city.
