= Oughterard =

Town in Connemara, Ireland

Oughterard Uachtar Ard (Irish)
- Town
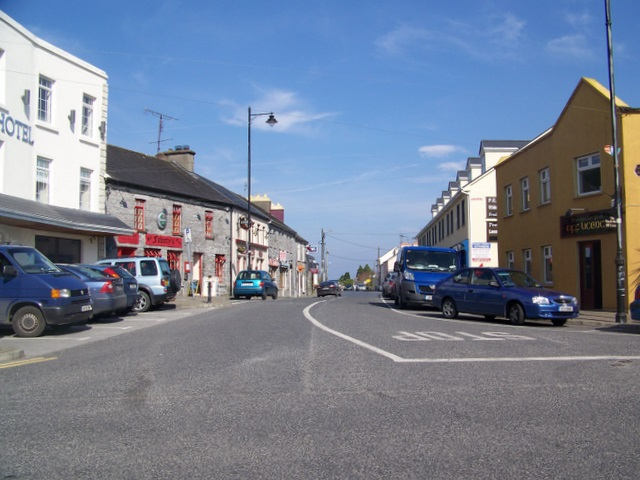
- Junction of Camp Street and Clifden Road in Oughterard

- Location in Ireland
- Coordinates: 53°25′00″N 9°20′00″W
- Country: Ireland
- Province: Connacht
- County: County Galway
- Elevation: 68 m (223 ft)

Population (2022)
  - Total: 1,846
- Irish Grid Reference: M113415

Oughterard (Irish: Uachtar Ard) is a small town on the banks of the Owenriff River close to the western shore of Lough Corrib in Connemara, County Galway, Ireland. It is located about 26 km (16 mi) northwest of Galway on the N59 road. Oughterard is the chief angling centre on Lough Corrib.

One of the fastest-growing towns in Ireland, it had a population of 1,846 in 2022, an increase of 40.1% from the 2016 census.

== History ==
Evidence of ancient settlement in Oughterard includes a number of ringfort, holy well and standing stone sites in the townlands of Ardvarna, Clare, Cregg and Fough West. The Record of Monuments and Places also records the site of a former castle or tower house, no longer standing, in Fough East townland. The remains of this structure may have been demolished when Oughterard's military barracks was built nearby in the mid-18th century.

Three kilometres outside the town stand the ruins of Aughnanure Castle, a well-preserved example of a medieval tower house. Much of the surrounding area was occupied by the O'Flaherty clan, but was taken over by Walter de Burgh, 1st Earl of Ulster, in 1256. Ross Castle is also located a number of kilometres outside Oughterard. The mansion, which is visible today, was built by the Martin family in the 17th century but there is some evidence still present of the original castle structure, built in the 15th century by the O'Flaherty family, in its foundation.

Also close to Oughterard, the Glengowla Mines (abandoned in 1865) is a "show mine" with exhibits on the lead and silver mining history of the area.

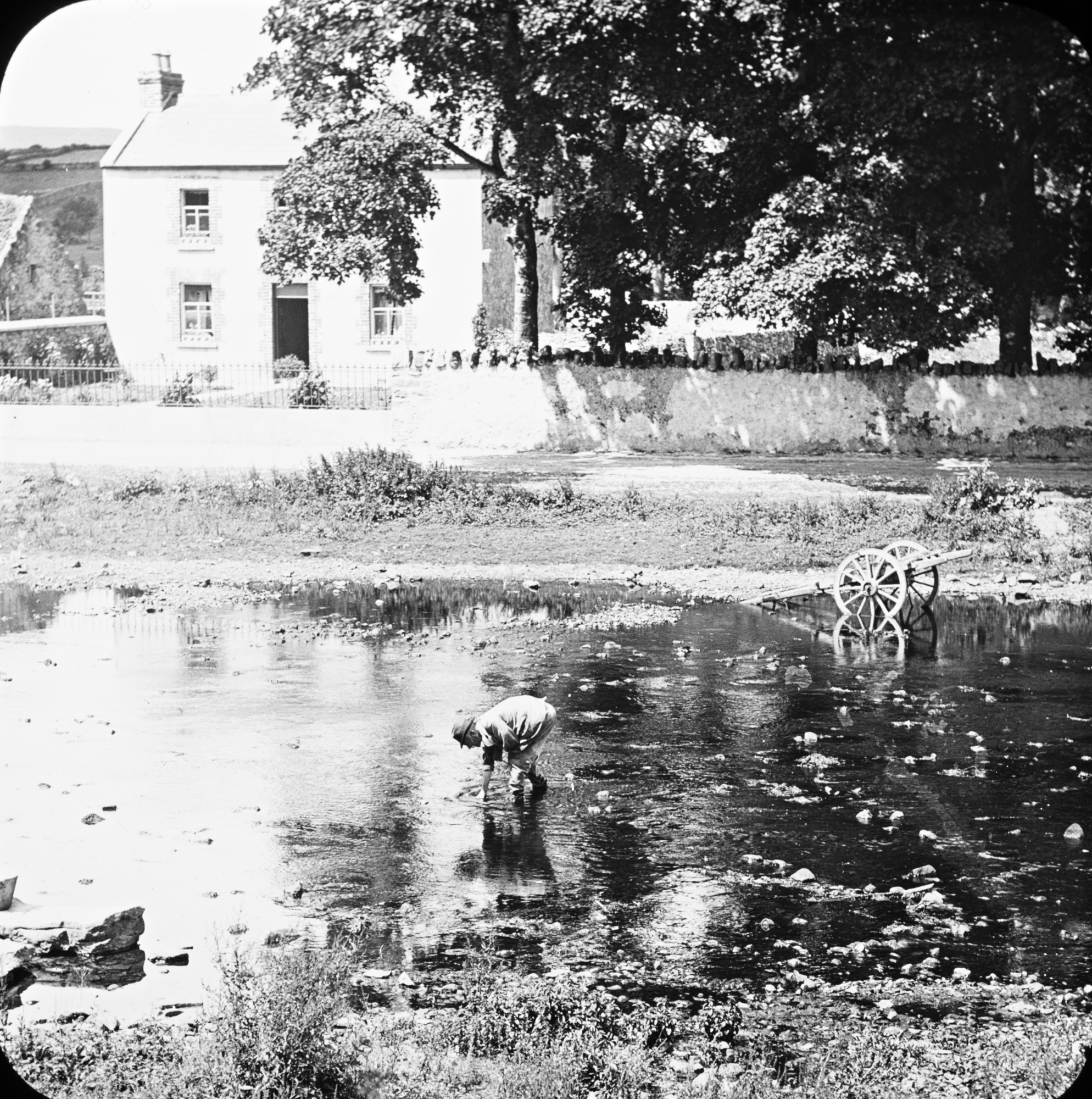
Oughterard and the Owenriff River c.1890-1910

Within the town, Oughterard's Catholic church was completed in 1829. This church, the Church of the Immaculate Conception, contains a stained glass window attributed to Harry Clarke. The Church of Ireland church, in Fough West townland, was built in 1808 and extended in 1852. Oughterard's court house, now also in use as a library, also dates from the early 19th century.

== Transport ==
Oughterard railway station was opened by the Midland Great Western Railway on 1 January 1895 as part of its line from Galway to Clifden. The station, and the line, were closed by the Great Southern Railways on 29 April 1935.

There are daily buses going to and from Galway and Clifden along the N59. City Link and Bus Éireann are the two bus services that travel to and from Galway.

== Amenities ==
Oughterard has a primary school, 'Scoil Chuimín agus Caitríona', and a co-educational voluntary secondary school, St Paul's. Oughterard also has a public library, which is based in the town's old courthouse, as well as a community centre with a public gymnasium.

== Events ==
Oughterard hosts a fishing festival every year in early May. The festival lasts for four days and includes fishing events, art exhibitions and concerts.

== Sport ==
The local Gaelic Athletic Association club, Oughterard GAA, won the All-Ireland Intermediate Club Football Championship in 2020.

Oughterard Golf Club, located outside the town, was incorporated in 1969 and developed in the early 1970s. It consists of an 18-hole championship course with a clubhouse, pro-shop and restaurant.

== In popular culture ==
Oughterard is mentioned directly twice in the James Joyce story "The Dead" (1914) as the fictional burial place of Michael Furey. In the story's final passages, the Gabriel Conroy character reflects on life and death and there is a further reference to Furey's grave.

The 'Quiet Man Bridge', located approximately 8 kilometres west of Oughterard on the N59 road, was used as a filming location for the 1950s film The Quiet Man starring John Wayne and Maureen O'Hara.

== People ==
- Tom Collins, filmmaker based in Oughterard
- John Purcell, soldier and recipient of the Victoria Cross, was born in Kilcommonn near Oughterard
- Joe Shaughnessy, professional footballer who was born in Oughterard
- Matthew Tierney, Gaelic footballer, part of the Galway county football team.

== See also ==
- List of towns in the Republic of Ireland
