= Glengowla Mines =

- Mianaigh Ghleann Gabhla
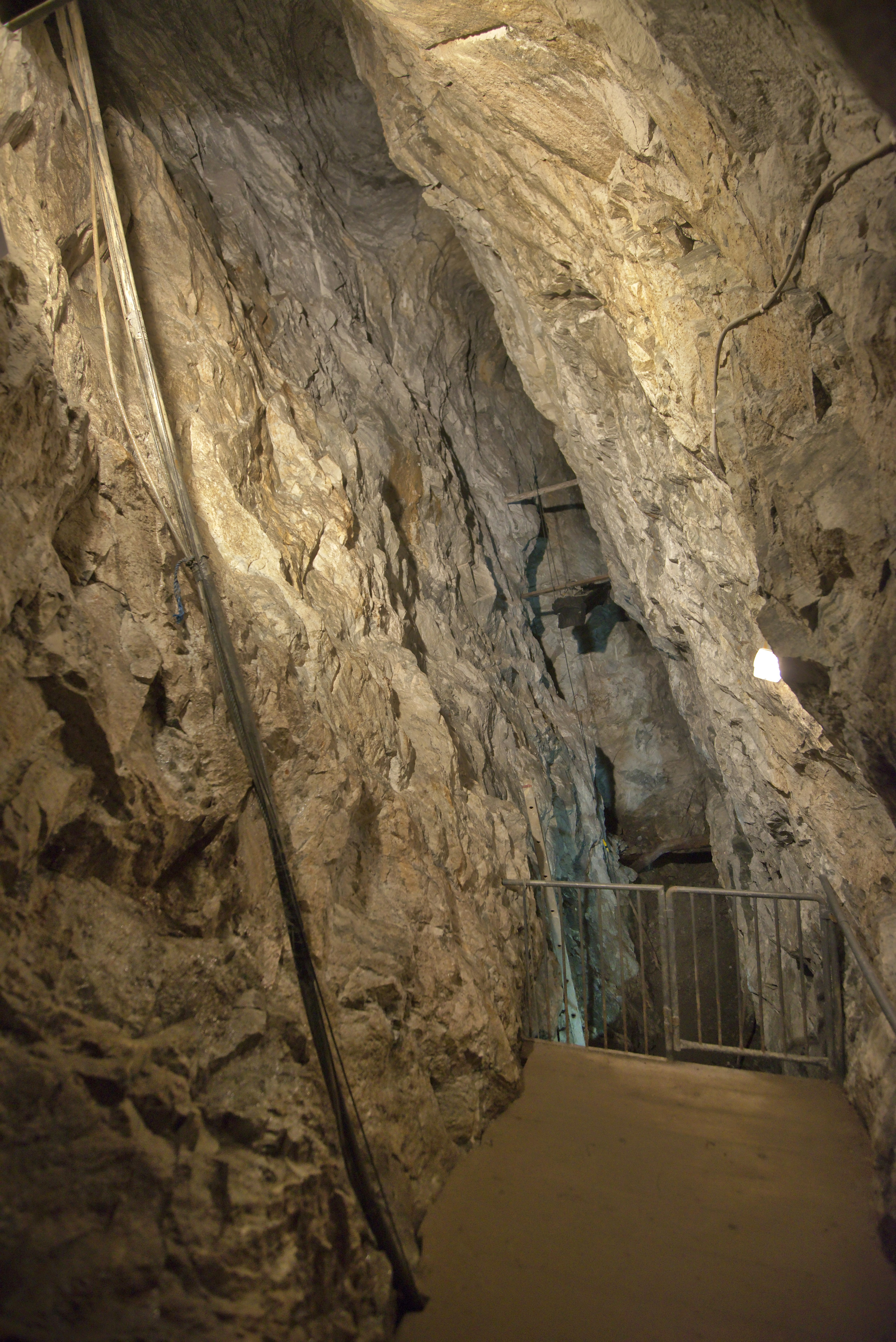

- Location within Ireland
- Established: 1999
- Location: Glengowla East, near Oughterard, County Galway, Ireland
- Coordinates: 53.418165°N 9.374353°W
- Type: Lead and silver mining museum
- Public transit access: Glengola Bridge (Bus Éireann route 421)
- Website: glengowlamines.ie

Glengowla Mines is a "show mine" dedicated to the lead and silver mining history of Glengowla and the Oughterard area.

== History ==
Mining at Glengowla began in 1851, after a farmer discovered galena just under the soil surface. The first mine shaft was named after a Captain Paul. The mine was in operation until 1865, eventually measuring 40 metres deep and 200 feet wide. The main mining centred on silver and lead, though Connemara marble, gold, dolerite, quartz, and rare green and blue octahedral fluorite.

== Exhibitions and tour ==
The site was opened as a heritage site by the owners of the land, Patrick and Keith Geoghegan. Glengowla Mines' site includes the remains of a 19th-century silver and lead mine, which has been restored to allow visitor access. There is also a heritage and visitor centre, a blacksmith's shop, and a circular powder house.

Glengowla is part of Ireland's National Seismic Network, logging real-time information with a seismograph, contributing to information of earthquakes worldwide.
