= The Model, Sligo =

Contemporary arts centre and gallery space in Sligo, Ireland

The Model
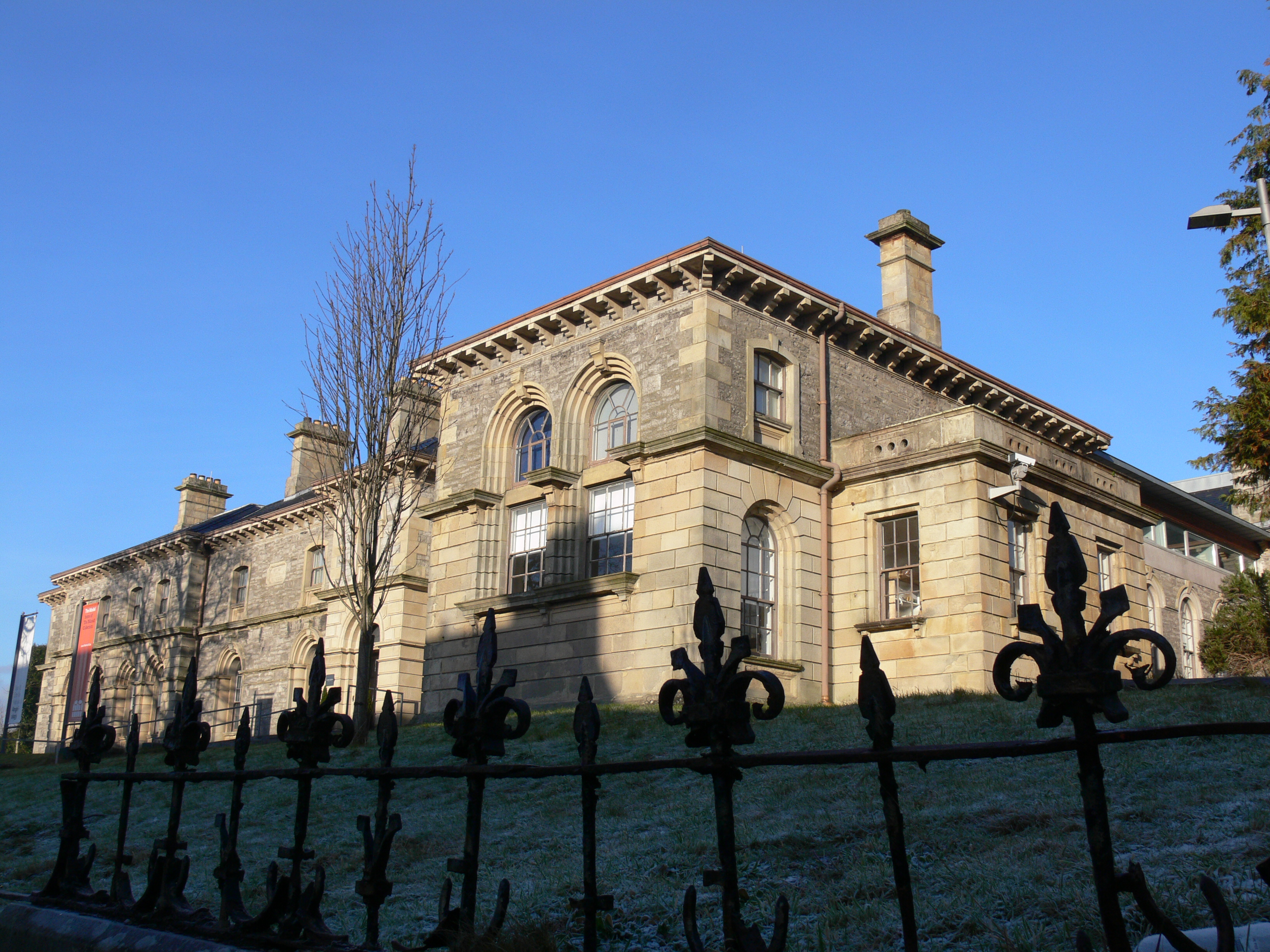
- 2011

- Location within Ireland
- Former name: Model Arts and Niland Gallery
- Established: 2001
- Location: The Mall, Sligo, Ireland
- Coordinates: 54°16′25″N 8°27′46″W
- Type: art gallery
- Architect: James Owen
- Public transit access: Sligo
- Website: themodel.ie

The Model, home of the Niland Collection, formerly called Model Arts and Niland Gallery, is a contemporary arts centre and gallery space in Sligo, Ireland. The gallery houses several exhibition spaces focusing on contemporary art and education activities, a cinema/venue for concerts, an artist-in-residence programme, and a collection of 20th-century Irish art called the Niland Collection. This collection is named for the former Sligo County librarian, Nora Niland.

== Building ==
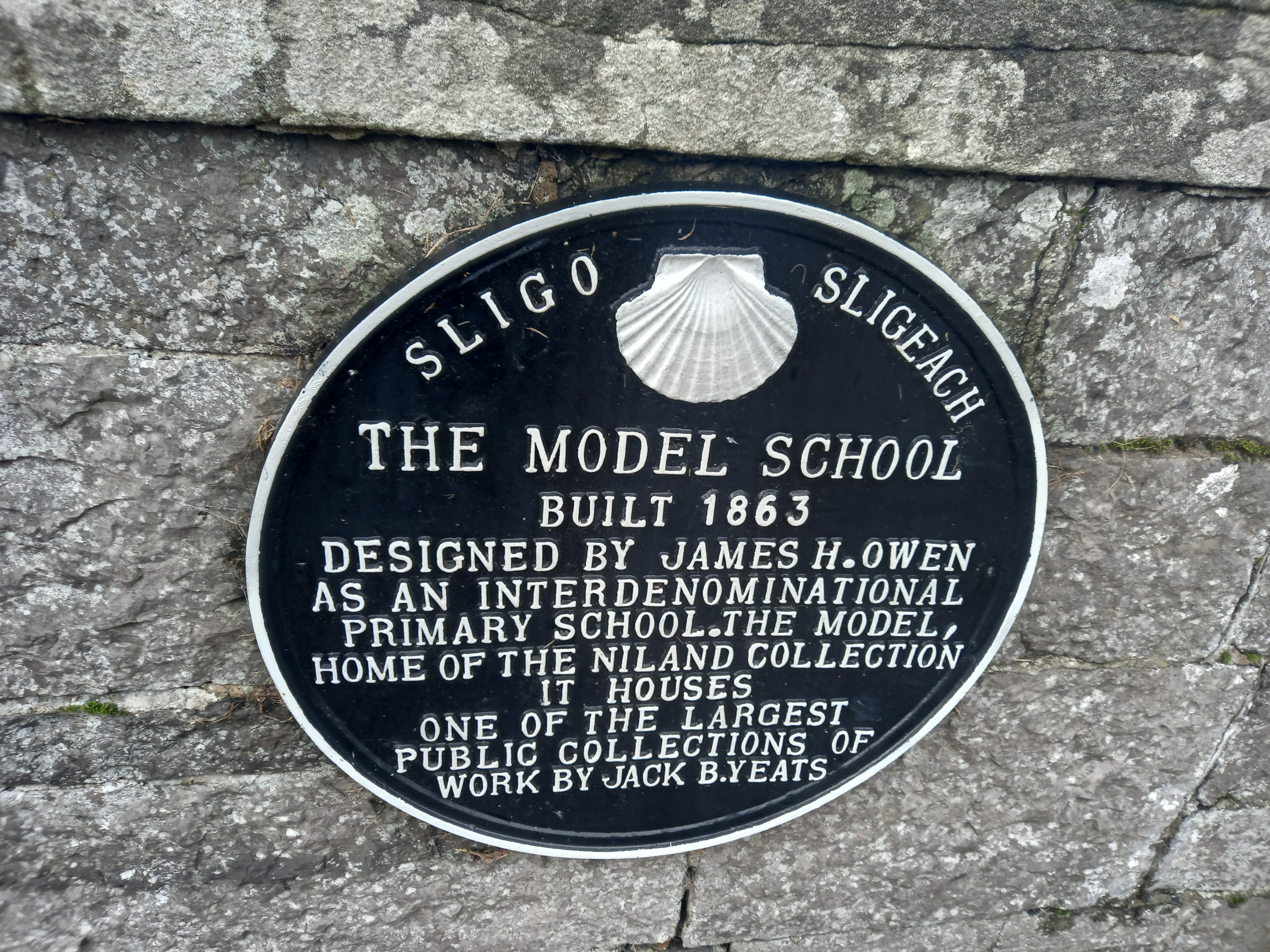
Informational sign

=== Use as school ===
Located on the Mall in Sligo town, north of the Garavogue river, The Model was designed by architect James Owen for the then Board of Works. It is a detached multiple-bay, two-storey rubble and ashlar stone building in the Italianate Palazzo style.

The original building was a purpose-built school, constructed in 1862, by local contractors Messrs Patrick Keighron & Son at a cost of £8000. These schools were known as "model" schools as they were to function as the template for primary schools throughout the country. Originally intended to be multi-denominational, the school became predominantly Protestant with the religious control of schools being the norm under the new Free State. The school provided primary education up to the age of 12. In the 1970s, the building was abandoned with the building of a new primary school across the road.

In the early 1990s it was acquired by Sligo County Council with the intention of providing a museum.

=== Refurbishment as museum and extensions ===
The building was refurbished and extended in 2000/2001 for use as a museum. The project was designed by McCullough Mulvin Architects. This extension was shortlisted for several architectural awards.

The Model was redeveloped for a second time between 2008 and 2010. This project was part of Sligo County Council's vision to create a Cultural Quarter for Sligo Town. This extension increased the building by a third in size. The extension provided artist studios, a purpose-built performance space and a new entrance from the north. The extension also created a complete gallery circuit for the visitor, a new reception area, bookstore and cafe. Works commenced in January 2008 and the Model reopened on 1 May 2010. Funding for the redevelopment included a grant of €2.4 million which was provided by the BMW Regional Assembly under an ERDF grant scheme for designated Gateways and Hub Towns. The Model:Niland project was the largest beneficiary in the BMW Region under the grant scheme. A further grant of 1.75 million euro was received from Access 2 funding under the Arts Council. Sligo Borough Council provided 600,000 euro in 2009. The €2.9 million grant, minus 600,000 already spent on groundworks for Sligo museum was switched to the Model Arts project in late 2008. A further 118,554 was granted in 2010 under the cultural development fund of the Arts Council. Sligo County Council spent 2.15 million on the Model Arts Centre project up to 2010. In all, €6.4 million was borrowed by Sligo County Council in relation to a new Cultural Quarter for Sligo Town up to December 2010.

== Niland Collection ==
The Niland Collection is named after former Sligo County librarian Nora Niland who began the collection in the 1950s. It contains over 300 works, including pieces by Paul Henry, Louis le Brocquy, Estella Solomons, George Russell and Jack Butler Yeats.

The Niland Collections contains one of the most significant collections of Yeats work in Ireland, many of which record experiences and memories of his time living in Sligo and its environs. The collection was begun by Nora Niland borrowing five works by Yeats to exhibit for the duration of the first Yeats Summer School in 1959. These works consisted of three large oil paintings, Communicating with Prisoners, The Funeral of Harry Boland and The Island Funeral, along with two smaller watercolours, Market Day and The Star Gazer.

== Operation and programmes ==
As of 2021, the museum is run by its Artistic Director / CEO, Emer McGarry, with support from administrative, educational, and other staff.

The Model is primarily a centre for the contemporary arts, led by visual art, and the museum has presented exhibitions with many of the world's leading artists. The Model also has a music programme which includes a mix of contemporary and classical performances. The Model develops music projects that respond to the exhibition programme.

The Model's international film programme is presented in partnership with Sligo Film Society.

Former artists in residence include Nasan Tur, Yorgos Sapountzis, Elizabeth Price, Barbara Breitenfellner, and Caoimhin O'Raghallaigh. The Model also has eight artist studios rented by locally based artists.

Previous notable exhibitions at The Model have included shows which included works by Patti Smith, Gerard Byrne and Andy Warhol.

== Notable events ==
On 20 May 2015 the English royal, Prince Charles made a speech at The Model during a visit to promote reconciliation to the scene of Lord Mountbatten's death by an IRA bomb in 1979 at Mullaghmore, County Sligo.

== Controversies ==
In 2009, controversy arose over the renaming of the centre. It was announced in June by director Seamus Kealy that the Model Arts and Niland Gallery was to be renamed as "The Model, home of The Niland Collection". Former President of the Yeats Summer School, Michael Keohane called the renaming a "public disgrace". The renaming was also called "absurd" by Bruce Arnold in an opinion piece in the Irish Independent in August 2009.

In 2010, controversial chef Conrad Gallagher opened a fine dining restaurant in the Model. By June 2011, the restaurant had moved to Sligo town centre. In July 2011, Irish Revenue commissioners ordered Gallagher to wind up his operations in Dublin and Sligo; neither had submitted accounts since incorporation the previous year and Gallagher was not listed as a director in either business.
