= St. Dympna's Hospital =

- Health Service Executive
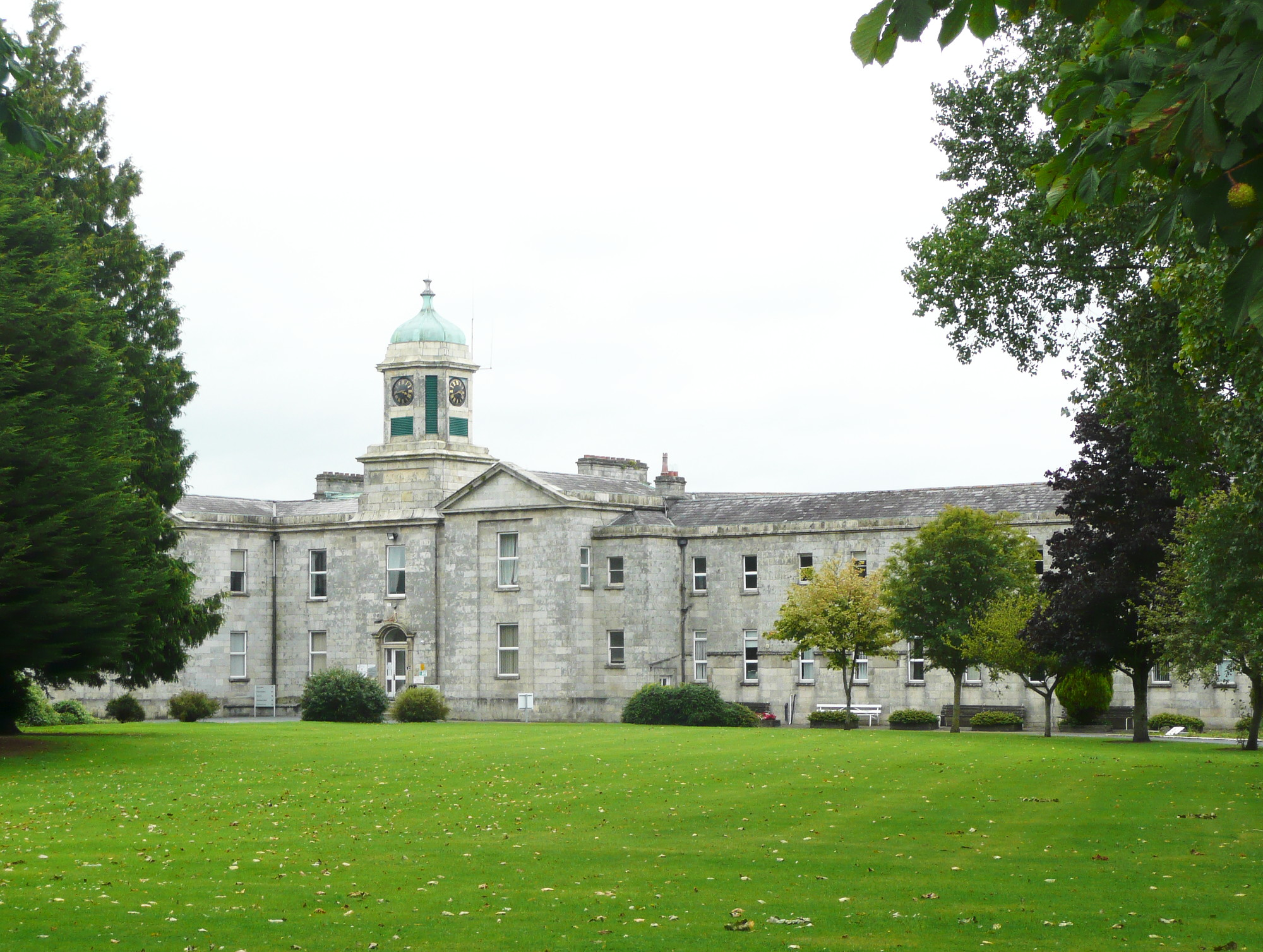
- St. Dympna's Hospital

- Shown in Ireland

Geography
- Location: Carlow, County Carlow, Ireland
- Coordinates: 52.8422°N 6.9272°W

Organisation
- Care system: HSE
- Type: Specialist

Services
- Emergency department: No
- Beds: 115
- Speciality: Psychiatric hospital

History
- Founded: 1832

Links
- Website: www.hse.ie/eng/services/list/1/lho/carlowkilkenny/mental-health-services/

St. Dympna's Hospital (Irish: Ospidéal Naomh Dympna) is a psychiatric hospital located in Carlow, County Carlow, Ireland.

== History ==
The hospital, which was designed by Francis Johnston, opened as the Carlow District Lunatic Asylum in May 1832. It became Carlow Mental Hospital in 1925 and, having been renamed St. Dympna's Hospital, after St. Dympna, the patron saint of mental illness, in 1958, it was taken over by the Department of Health in 1971. After the introduction of deinstitutionalisation in the late 1980s the hospital went into a period of decline. Kelvin Grove, a modern residential unit for adult clients with learning difficulties, opened on the site in 2008. The main hospital closed in October 2011.

== Patient services ==
Services include out-patient clinics, day care facilities, addiction counselling, and a community hostel.
