= Kathleen Goodfellow =

Irish poet, writer and translator

- Born: 20 August 1891; Dublin
- Died: 20 May 1980 (aged 88); Dublin
- Resting place: Mount Jerome Cemetery, Dublin
- Education: Alexandra College; Trinity College Dublin
- Occupations: Writer, poet, translator
- Writing career
- Pen name: Michael Scot
- Notable work: Three Tales of the Times

Kathleen Goodfellow (20 August 1891 - 20 May 1980) was an Irish writer, poet and translator who was involved with the Irish nationalist cause. While a member of Cumann na mBan, she met artist Estella Solomons with whom she would have a lifelong friendship. Under the pseudonym Michael Scot, she wrote Three Tales of the Times, a book about life in Ireland under the Black and Tans. She also translated French poetry, particularly that of François Villon. She was independently wealthy and owned a row of houses in Donnybrook, Dublin. She was a patron of the arts and of The Dublin Magazine, a literary journal owned by her friend Seumas O'Sullivan, to which she contributed articles, poems and book reviews. She also supported children's charities and was on the Board of Governors of the Royal Hospital in Donnybrook.

== Early life ==
Goodfellow was born in Dublin on 20 August 1891 to George Goodfellow and Susan Goodfellow (née Nicholson). The family were Quakers. Her father and uncle Jack were builders and they constructed a row of houses (numbers 2, 4, 6, 8, 10 and 12) on Morehampton Road, Donnybrook. The Goodfellow family lived at 4 Morehampton Road, where Goodfellow lived out her life.

She was educated at Alexandra College and graduated with an Arts degree from Trinity College, Dublin. On her mother's death in 1932, she inherited the estate of her maternal grandfather including property in England and Ireland, which made her independently wealthy.

== Nationalism ==
Goodfelllow joined the Rathmines branch of Cumann na mBan, where she was taught first aid, drilling and signalling by Phyllis Ryan. Goodfellow first met Estella Solomons, another Cumann na mBan member, on Baggot Street Bridge under sniper fire in the Easter Rising. Solomons was an artist whose studio later became a safe house for republicans escaping the Black and Tans during the War of Independence. She painted the portraits of the patriots she hosted in her studio, including Goodfellow's.

== Career ==
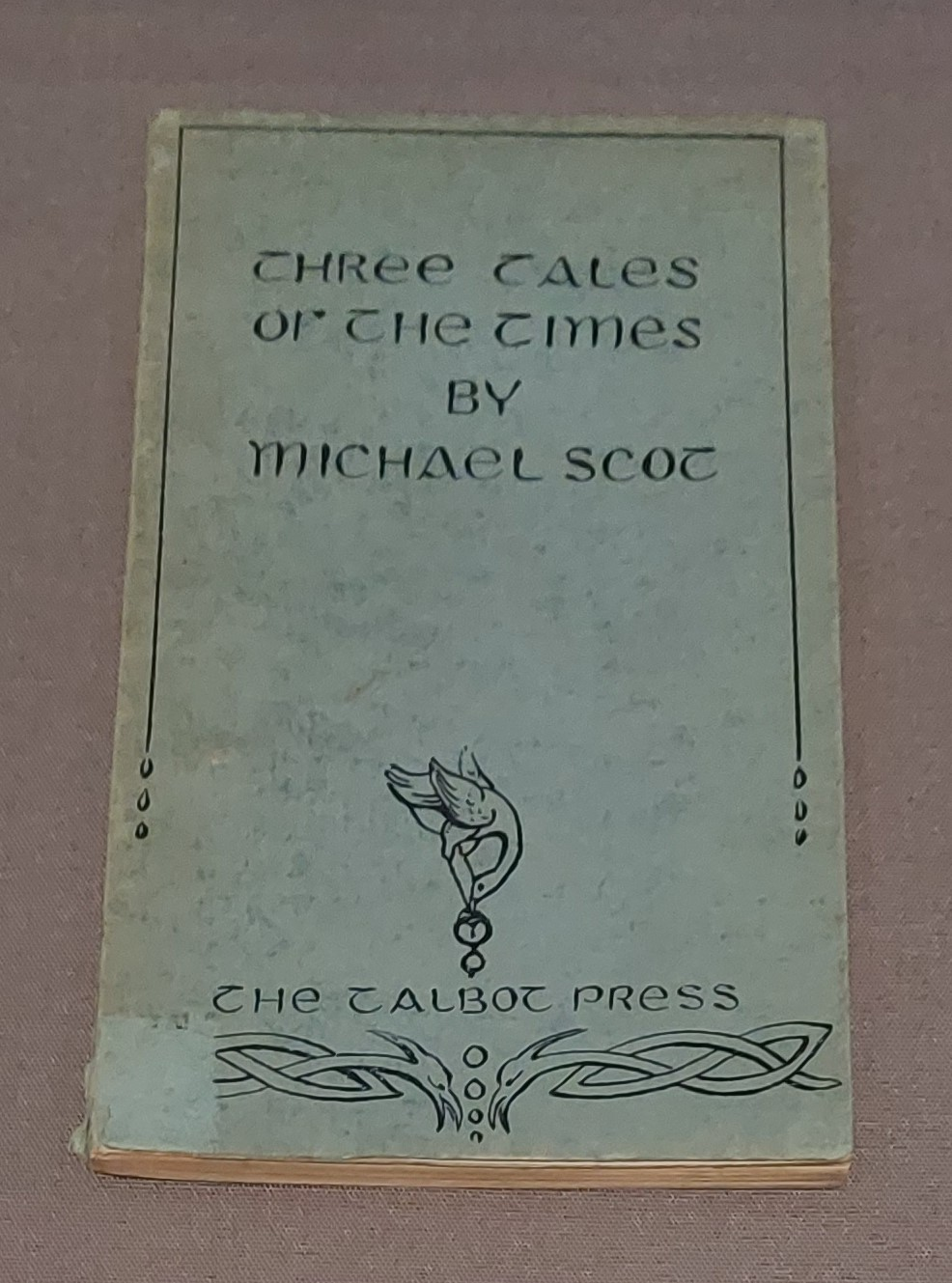
Three Tales of the Times (1921), Michael Scot (aka Kathleen Goodfellow). From the Yeats Archive of the National Gallery of Ireland.

Goodfellow wrote a book Three Tales of the Times in 1921 about life under the Black and Tans, using the pseudonym Michael Scot. It was published by Talbot Press, Dublin. She used the pseudonym for her "patriotic writings". She was known to her friends as either Goodfellow or Michael. She wrote poetry and was also a literary translator, significantly translating the work of 15th century French poet François Villon into English. Her translations of Villon were published in The Dublin Magazine between 1924 and 1928.

=== The Dublin Magazine ===
The Dublin Magazine was founded and edited by the poet Seumas O'Sullivan (James Starkey) in 1923. The magazine became an influential literary publication, providing a platform for Irish art and literature until O'Sullivan's death in 1958. Goodfellow published her poetry, translations, book reviews and articles in it, as well as being involved in its editing and administration. Goodfellow also helped to keep the magazine afloat financially throughout its existence. Estella Solomons' nephew Michael has described Goodfellow as "an exceptional person" without whom the Dublin Magazine could not have survived.

When Solomons and O'Sullivan were looking to move from their house in Rathfarham because of a damp problem, Goodfellow offered them the house beside her own on Morehampton Road for a nominal rent. Solomons also painted in The Grove, a woodland area at the corner of Morehampton Road and Wellington Place, which was also owned by Goodfellow.

== Philanthropy ==
Goodfellow used her wealth to contribute to good causes, in particular children's charities. She was a member of the board of governors for the Royal Hospital in Donnybrook, near her home.

In 1979 Goodfellow bequeathed ownership of The Grove to An Taisce, a charity that works to preserve and protect Ireland's natural and built heritage, on condition that it be maintained as a place of refuge for birds and plants. It is now known as the Morehampton Road Wildlife Sanctuary and is an example of conservation management in an urban setting, supporting a wealth of wildlife including bats, sparrowhawks, frogs and foxes.

Goodfellow bequeathed the portraits Solomons had painted of her to the Model and Niland Collection in Sligo and the National Gallery of Ireland.

== Later life and death ==
In 1939, Goodfellow fell while getting off a tram and broke her leg badly, which left her with a limp. She died aged 89 on 20 May 1980 and is buried with her parents in Mount Jerome cemetery.

A plaque was erected in memory of her donation at The Grove on 19 October 2022. A plaque commemorating Estella Solomons was placed on the opposite gatepost. Goodfellow's diaries, poems and literary manuscripts are held in the Trinity College Dublin archives.
