= Estella Solomons =

Irish artist

Estella Frances Solomons
- Born: 2 April 1882; Dublin, Ireland
- Died: 2 November 1968 (aged 86); Dublin, Ireland
- Resting place: Woodtown Progressive Jewish Cemetery
- Education: Dublin Metropolitan School of Art, Chelsea School of Art
- Known for: Painting, portraiture, etching, print-making
- Notable work: Portrait of a Woman; Portrait of Jack B Yeats; Woman in a Red Tie; Portrait of Alice Milligan; On Parole
- Spouse: Seumas O'Sullivan
- Elected: Honorary member of the Royal Hibernian Academy (HRHA)
- Memorials: Plaque at The Grove on Morehampton Road, Dublin

Estella Frances Solomons (2 April 1882– 2 November 1968) was one of the leading Irish artists of her generation. She came from a prominent Dublin Jewish family. She studied at the Dublin Metropolitan School of Art and the Chelsea School of Art. She was a member of Cumann na mBan and was active during the revolutionary period. She was noted for her portraits of contemporaries in the republican movement, and her studio was a safe house during the War of Independence. She married poet Seumas O'Sullivan, founder of The Dublin Magazine, and helped to support it financially. The couple hosted regular salons in their home, which attracted Irish artists, writers, politicians, and intellectuals. Solomons was a close friend of writer Kathleen Goodfellow, whom she met in Cumann na mBan and who was a patron of The Dublin Magazine. Solomons was elected an honorary member of the Royal Hibernian Academy in 1966, having been an associate since 1925.

== Early life and family ==
Estella Francis Solomons was born on 2 April 1882 in Dublin, Ireland, to Maurice Solomons (1832–1922) and poet Rosa Jane Jacobs. Her father was an optician whose practice in 19 Nassau Street, Dublin, is mentioned in Ulysses. Her father was also the Vice-Consul of Austria-Hungary. The Solomons family, who came to Dublin from England in 1824, are one of the oldest continuous lines of Jews in Ireland.

Her grandmother, Rosa Jacobs Solomons (1833–1926), who was born in Hull in England, was the author of a book called Facts and fancies (Dublin 1883). Estella's brother, Bethel Solomons, a renowned physician, a master of the Rotunda Hospital, and an Irish international rugby player, is mentioned in Finnegans Wake. Her brother Edwin (1879–1964) was a stockbroker and a prominent member of the Dublin Jewish community. Her younger sister Sophie was a trained opera singer. A portrait of Sophie, by her cousin, the printmaker Louise Jacobs, survives in the Estella Solomons archives in the Library of Trinity College Dublin.

== Career ==
In 1898, at the age of 16, Solomons entered the Dublin Metropolitan School of Art, where she won a significant prize. Her classmates included future leading Irish artists, including Mary Swanzy, Eva Hamilton (1876–1960), and William J. Leech (1881–1968). She also attended the Chelsea School of Art from 1903 to 1906. A visit to the tercentenary exhibition of the work of Rembrandt in Amsterdam in 1903 impacted her creative practice and may have influenced her adoption of printmaking as her principal vehicle of expression. She studied under two of Ireland's leading artists, Walter Osborne, who was another major influence, and William Orpen. With her friends Cissie Beckett (aunt of Samuel Beckett) and Beatrice Elvery, she went to study in Paris in Colorossi's studio. On her return, she exhibited in Leinster Hall, Molesworth Street, with contemporaries such as Beatrice Elvery, Eva Hamilton, and Grace Gifford. Her work was also included in joint exhibitions with other artists at Mills Hall (1919, with Mary Duncan) and the Arlington Gallery, London (1935, with Louise Jacobs). She also exhibited at her Great Brunswick Street studio in December 1926.

Solomons illustrated Padraic Colum's The Road Round Ireland (1926) and DL Kelleher's The Glamour of Dublin in 1928. Originally published after the devastation of the 1916 Rising, the later edition features eight views of familiar locations in the city centre, including Merchant's Arch and King's Inns. Her etching 'A Georgian Doorway' was included in Katherine MacCormack's Leabhar Ultuin in 1920. This publication featured illustrations by several prominent Irish artists and was sold in aid of the new children's hospital, St Ultan's in Charlemont Street, Dublin, that had been founded by two prominent members of Cumann na mBan, Dr Kathleen Lynn and Madeleine ffrench-Mullen.

She painted landscapes and portraits, including those of artist Jack Yeats, politician Arthur Griffiths, poet Austin Clarke, and writers James Stephens and George Russell (AE).

Solomons was elected an associate of the Royal Hibernian Academy of Arts in July 1925, but it was not until 1966 that she was elected an honorary member. Her work was included in the Academy's annual members’ exhibition every year for sixty years.

== Personal life ==
Solomons was married to poet and publisher Seumas O'Sullivan (1879–1958), whose birth name was James Sullivan Starkey. Her parents opposed the relationship as O'Sullivan was not of the Jewish faith. They married in 1925, when she was 43 and he 46, after her parents had died. She collaborated with her husband on The Dublin Magazine (1923–1958), the renowned literary and art journal, of which O'Sullivan was editor for 35 years. Solomons provided vital financial support to the magazine, particularly in sourcing advertising, which was difficult in the tough economic climate of the new Free State. She was helped in this endeavour by poet and writer Kathleen Goodfellow, a lifelong friend. When Solomons and O'Sullivan were looking to move from their house in Rathfarnham because of a damp problem, Goodfellow offered them the house beside her own on Morehampton Road for a nominal rent. Two of Solomons' portraits of Goodfellow are in the Model Niland Gallery in Sligo.

== Political activities ==
Solomons joined the Ranelagh branch of Cumann na mBan at the same time as Goodfellow. They were taught first aid, drilling and signalling by Phyllis Ryan. Solomons was active before and during the Irish War of Independence. She concealed ammunition in the family vegetable garden before delivering it to a Sinn Féin agent. Her studio at Great Brunswick Street was used as a safe house by republican volunteers. During this time, she painted the portraits of a number of revolutionaries, some of which she had to later destroy to avoid incriminating them. Her work includes a portrait of Frank Aiken when he was chief of staff of the IRA.

== Later life and death ==
Solomons took up a teaching position at Bolton Street, Dublin. In 1939, she organised an exhibition in Dublin to help refugee artists from Europe.

She died on 2 November 1968 and is buried in Woodtown Progressive Jewish Cemetery. Her friend Kathleen Goodfellow gifted the Morehampton Road Wildlife Sanctuary, where Solomons liked to paint, to An Taisce. Two plaques have subsequently been erected there, one in memory of Solomons and one for Goodfellow.

== Archive ==
Works of Estella Solomons are held in the Niland Collection, at The Model gallery in Sligo and in the National Gallery of Ireland. Her archives, which include artwork and photographs (and prints by Louise Jacobs), and the archives of the Dublin Magazine are in the Library of Trinity College Dublin.
