= Booterstown marsh =

Saltwater marshland in County Dublin, Ireland

Coordinates: 53°18′38″N 6°11′51″W

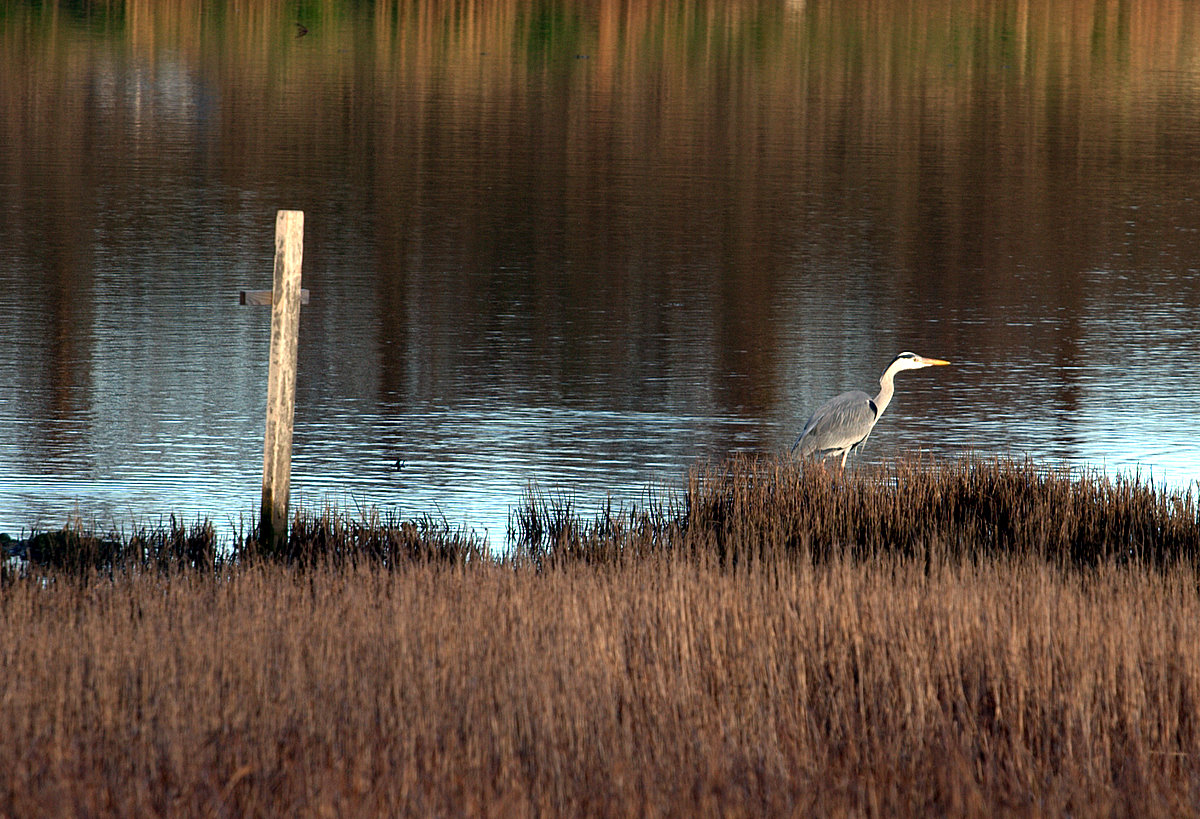
Heron in Booterstown Marsh

Booterstown Marsh, a Nature Reserve, is located in Booterstown, County Dublin, between the coastal railway line and the Rock Road. It is an area of salt marsh and muds, with brackish water. It includes the only salt marsh, and the only bird sanctuary, in south Dublin Bay. It lies just outside the boundary of Dublin city, and just north of Booterstown DART station and its car park.

The marsh belongs to the residual Pembroke Estate, and An Taisce administer it, having acquired a lease in 1970-1971 and having designated it a bird sanctuary. It is part of both a proposed Natural Heritage Area (NHA) and a proposed Special Area of Conservation (SAC), and of the South Dublin Bay and River Tolka Estuary Special Protection Area (SPA).

== Geography ==
The marsh covers an area of approximately 4.3 ha. It is fed with fresh water from the Nutley Stream. This is occasionally supplemented from the Trimleston (or St. Helen's) Stream, which runs in a raised box culvert at the city end of the marsh. At the southern end the Nutley leaves the marsh and passes under the entrance to Booterstown DART station, reemerging into a channel, Williamstown Lagoon or Creek, which runs south for some distance and then flows east to the sea under the railway embankment. Some salt water flow reaches the marsh from this channel at each rising of the tide (the amount of salt water flow is limited by the passage at the railway station).

The marsh contains two low-lying mud islands, made to provide secure resting and roosting areas for birds. These were formed in 2006.

== History of the marsh ==
=== Origins ===
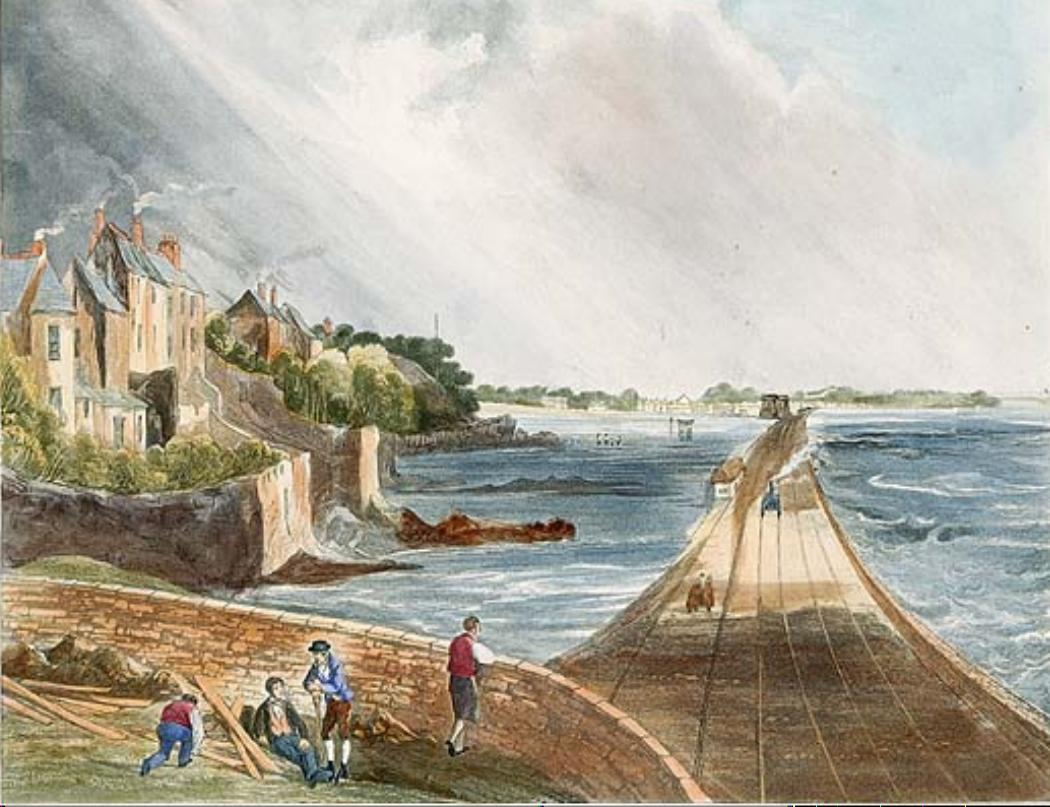
The new railway line and causeway looking northwards from Blackrock. (1834) Area to the left became Blackrock Park and the marsh formed further north

Originally the area now occupied by Booterstown Marsh was open to Merrion Strand and was part of a fringe marsh from Dublin city to Blackrock. Over time, much of this marshland was lost due to reclamation. The current marsh resulted from the building of the Dublin and Kingstown (now Dún Laoghaire) railway line, which was one of the first in the world, from 1834-35. The line was built on an embankment, protected by a granite seawall. In the 1830s, the resulting tidal lagoon covered more than 28 ha. In the following decades much of the area was filled in (part of it now forming Blackrock Park), leaving only Booterstown marsh still subject to flooding by seawater at high tide.

=== Agricultural use ===
By 1876 this reclaimed land was in agricultural use, made possible by the use of water control systems. A large gate valve was installed at the Williamstown outlet to the sea, which was lowered on the flow tide and raised on the ebb tide. The Williamstown lagoon acted as a sump, collecting the water draining from the agricultural land. Some landfill soil raised the level of the marsh and it was irrigated with fresh water from local streams.

During both World Wars the marsh was used as allotments, however with increasing prosperity these fell idle and in the 1950s the area was used as pasture. The water control systems were also neglected, allowing salt water to flow back into the system.

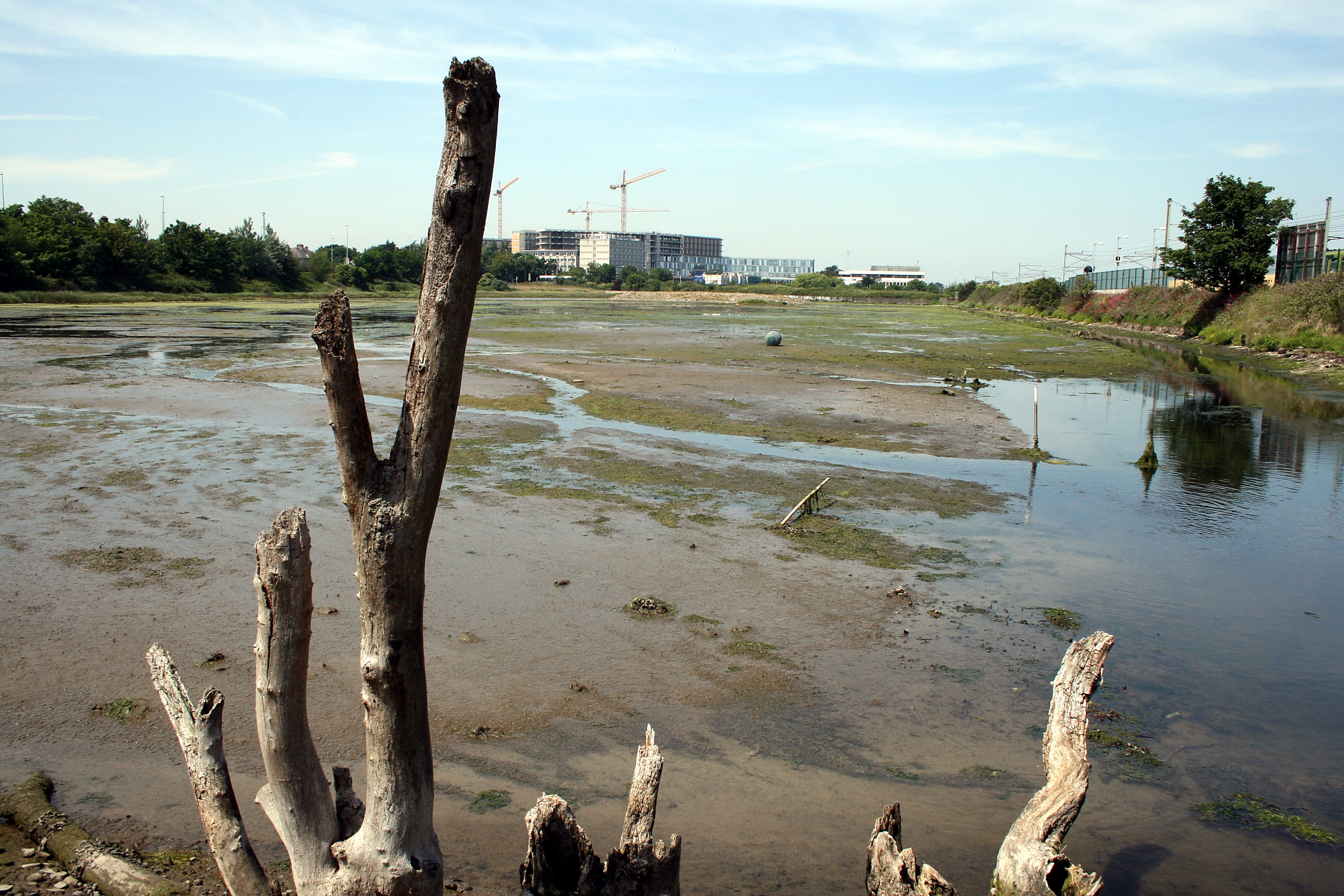
The marsh at low tide, from the southeastern boundary looking northwest. Right - the railway line; Left - the Rock Road (2007)

By the 1970s the marsh showed salty vegetation at the railway side and fresh-water at the inner edges. This mixed habitat became an important site for many marsh bird and plant species. In 1970 the lease on the land was acquired by An Taisce, a conservation society, which has managed it as a nature reserve.

=== 1980s to present ===
Oil spills in 1982 and, more severely in 1985, led to de-oxygenation of the marsh. The vegetation came to be dominated by Bolboschoenus maritimus, a rush that could withstand the salty conditions, though the re-discovery of a rare species of grass following some works on the drainage enhanced the conservation status of the marsh. In response the flap valves were removed, allowing a free flow of salt water that is rich in oxygen.

Aside from the formation of the two mud islands for birds in 2006, no major work has been performed on the marsh in recent years, although a viewing area was made on a small pocket of land just to the north.

== Access and viewing ==
The marsh is immediately adjacent to the Rock Road, the main coastal route from Dublin city to Blackrock, Dún Laoghaire and Dalkey, and close to the N11. There is paid parking at the DART station. Some Dublin Bus routes pass along the road also. It can be viewed from all sides, although viewing from the DART platform requires a train ticket, and there is a small viewing area with seating at the northwestern corner, opposite the end of Trimleston Avenue. An overhead view can be obtained from the footbridge across the railway line.

== Flora and fauna ==
There are three main habitats ranging from near-freshwater in the north-western corner to near-saltwater by the DART station, with a graduation between.

In recent years, the condition of the mud and water have improved, and birds have returned in large numbers. The scirpus growth has significantly reduced, and the many other species of plant occurring in the marsh have recovered. One of these, Puccinellia fasiculata, commonly "Borrer's saltmarsh grass," is protected, along with its habitat. Other flora include salt-tolerant species such as sea milkwort, false fox sedge, and sea spurrey.

The marsh area attracts moorhen, common teal, reed bunting, coot, mallard, sedge warbler, common snipe, little egret, northern lapwing, Eurasian oystercatcher, bar-tailed godwit, common redshank, dunlin, knot and brent goose. Additional species breeding in the marsh or visiting from nearby breeding locations include blackbird, dunnock and wren. Rarer visitors but sometimes sighted are grey heron, spotted redshank, ruff and little stint, Eurasian sparrowhawk and pied avocet. A short-billed dowitcher was present at the site from 2004-2005. Along the Nutley Stream kingfisher appear, and greenshank and water rail are seen in the south eastern corner. From the shore, common gull, herring gull and black-headed gull visit.

== Management ==
The marsh is today managed by An Taisce, represented by the Dún Laoghaire local association and one of the national committees, working with scientists, Birdwatch Ireland and representatives of other users. A support group, Friends of Booterstown, also assists.

Due to the presence of a rare plant, the National Parks and Wildlife Service has an oversight role with regard to major works on the marsh, or planning requests.
