= Bethel Solomons =

Irish rugby union player

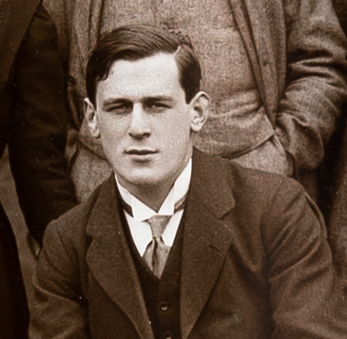
- Solomons in 1911 at the Rotunda Hospital
- Born: Bethel Albert Herbert Solomons; 27 February 1885 Dublin, Ireland
- Died: 11 September 1965 (aged 80) Wandsworth, England
- School: St. Andrews College, Dublin
- University: Trinity College, Dublin
- Occupation: Doctor

Rugby union career
- Position: Forward
Amateur team(s)
Years	Team	Apps	(Points)
- Dublin University
–	Sir Patrick Dun's Hospital		
–	Wanderers		
International career
Years	Team	Apps	(Points)
1908–10	Ireland	10	(0)

Bethel Albert Herbert Solomons (27 February 1885 – 11 September 1965), born into a prominent Jewish family, was an Irish medical doctor and an international rugby player for Ireland and supporter of the 1916 Rising.

== Early life ==
Bethel Albert Herbert Solomons born in Dublin, Ireland, to a prominent Jewish family, one of the oldest continuous Jewish families in Ireland. The Solomons came over to Ireland from England in 1824. Bethel Solomons was the son of Maurice Solomons (1832–1922), an optician whose practice is mentioned in James Joyce's Ulysses. (Note: Maurice Solomons (1832–1922), an optician whose practice in 19 Nassau Street in Dublin is mentioned in James Joyce's Ulysses: "Striding past Finn's hotel Cashel Boyle O'Connor Fitzmaurice Tisdall Farrell stared through a fierce eyeglass across the carriages at the head of Mr M. E. Solomons in the window of the Austro-Hungarian viceconsulate.") His grandmother Rosa Jacobs Solomons (1833–1926) was born in Hull in England.

Bethel's elder brother Edwin (1879–1964) was a stockbroker and prominent member of the Dublin Jewish community. His sister Estella Solomons (1882–1968) was a leading artist, and a member of Cumann na mBan during the 1916 rising; she married poet and publisher Seumas O'Sullivan. His younger sister Sophie was a trained opera singer.

== Career ==
Solomons attended St. Andrews School in Dublin where he was very interested in rugby; He earned 10 international rugby caps for Ireland (1908–1910).

He studied medicine in Trinity College, Dublin, became a medical doctor, and was Master of the Rotunda Hospital in Dublin from 1926 to 1933. This is mentioned in James Joyce's Finnegans Wake: in my bethel of Solyman's I accouched my rotundaties. He served as president of the Royal College of Physicians of Ireland (RCPI) in the late 1940s and he practiced from No. 30 Lr. Baggot Street.

In a biography of Solomons he was described as "World famous obstetrician & gynaecologist, Rugby international, horseman, leader of Liberal Jewry & of Irish literary & artistic renaissance."

== Personal life ==
He married Gertrude Levy in the liberal synagogue in London in 1916. His second son, Dr Michael Solomons (1919–2007) was a distinguished gynaecologist, a pioneer of family planning in Ireland, and a veteran of the bitter and divisive 1983 constitutional amendment campaign.

He was a friend of the founder of Sinn Féin and TD, Arthur Griffith. Solomons contributed to the purchase of a house for Griffith. Solomons was a founding member and the first president of the Dublin Jewish Progressive Congregation.

Solomon was an art collector, including the works of Jean Cooke.

== See also ==
- List of select Jewish rugby union players

== Sources ==
- Encyclopedia Judaica, Second Edition, volume 19, p146
- Goodwin, Terry The Complete Who's Who of International Rugby (Blandford Press, England, 1987, ISBN 0-7137-1838-2)
