= Mongan Bog =

Peat bog in County Offaly, Ireland

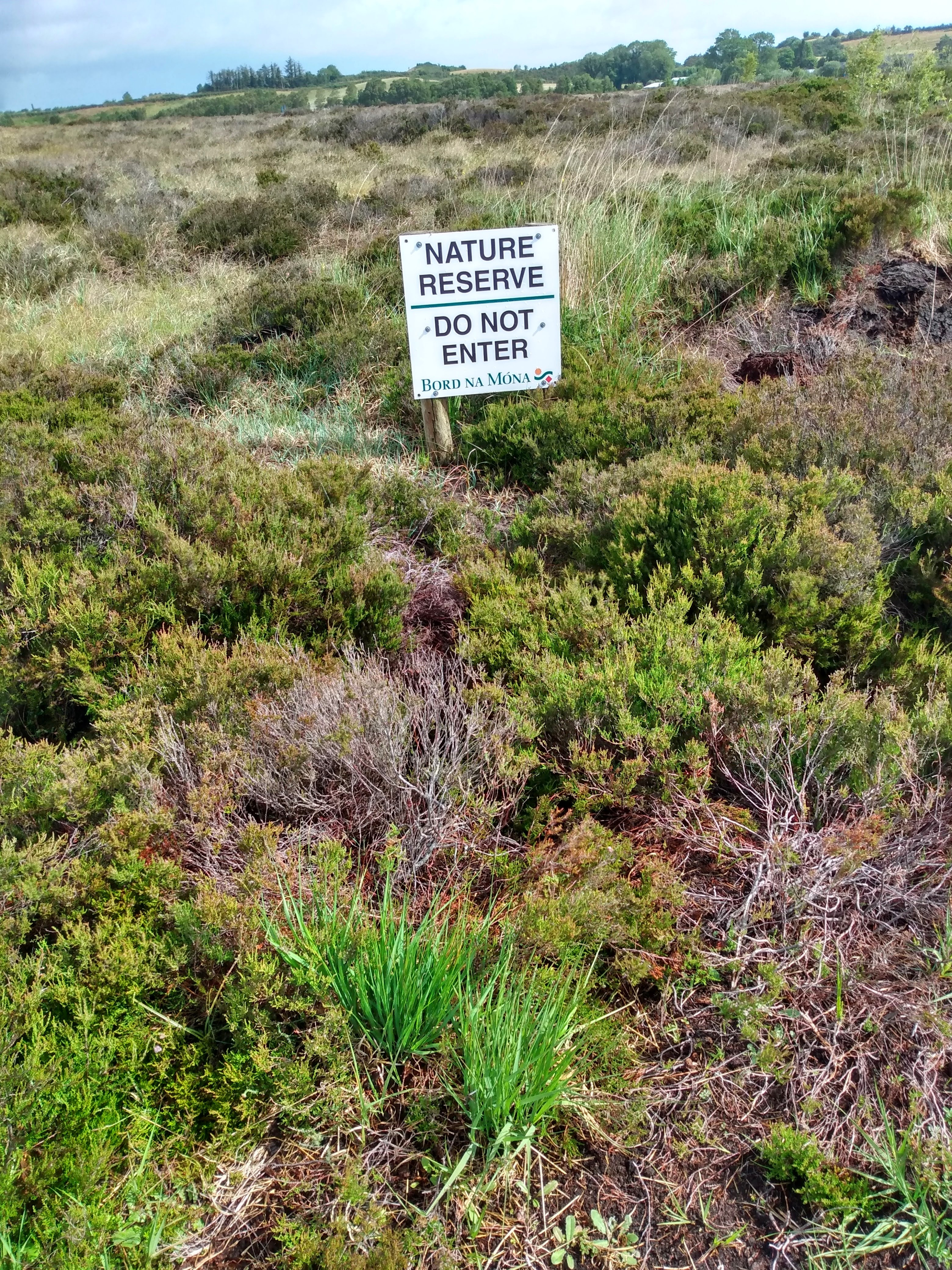
- Mongan Bog
- Interactive map of Mongan Bog
- Location: County Offaly, Ireland
- Coordinates: 53°19′41″N 7°57′09″W
- Area: 297 acres (1.20 km^{2})

Mongan Bog is a peat bog in County Offaly, Ireland. The bog is located east of Clonmacnoise, a monastic site on the river Shannon. A nature reserve covering about 120 ha protects part of the bog.

== Protection designations ==
As a raised bog of ecological interest, it was designated a Special Area of Conservation (covering 207 ha) in 2017. A larger area is protected for its birdlife as a Special Protection Area (SPA): Mongan Bog SPA covers 1,843 ha and is also an Important Bird Area. This site was formerly important for wintering Greenland white-fronted geese Anser albifrons flavirostris.

== History ==
The bog began to form around 9,000 years ago between two eskers. The bog remained relatively intact for most of its history, but during the 1970s machines were used to drain parts of the bog, which drastically shrunk it. This sparked the preservation movement that has led to the preservation of many bogs throughout Ireland. In the current decade, Mongan is the largest bog in the area.

== Access ==
The nature reserve belongs to An Taisce, an organisation which preserves examples of Ireland's built and natural heritage. The nature reserve is open by appointment for research.
