= Rathgar =

Suburb of Dublin, Ireland

Rathgar Ráth Garbh (Irish)
- Suburb
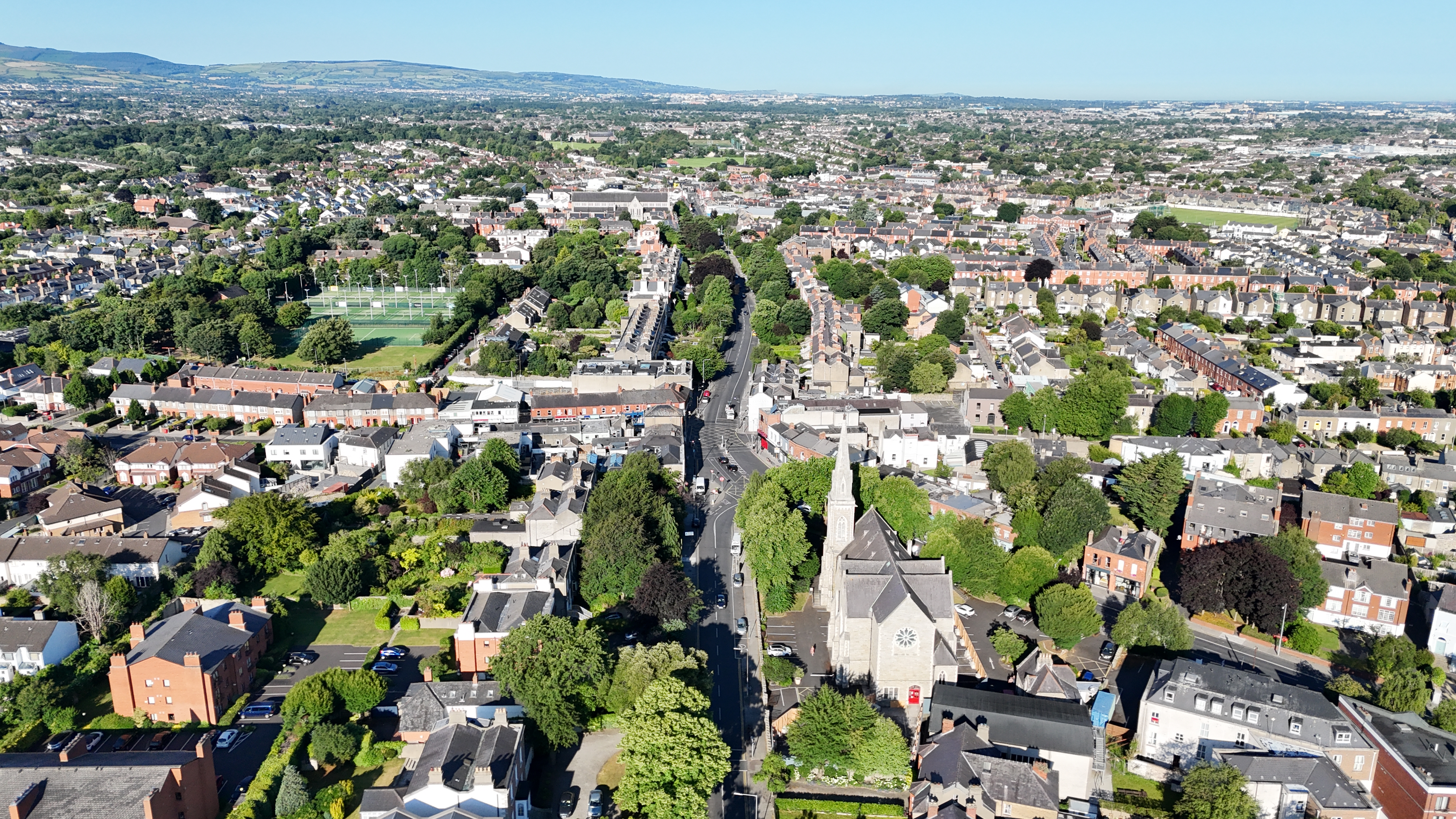
- Rathgar aerial view

- Location in Ireland Rathgar (Dublin)
- Coordinates: 53°18.7′N 6°16.46′W
- Country: Ireland
- Province: Leinster
- County: Dublin
- Local government area: Dublin City Council

Rathgar (Irish: Ráth Garbh, meaning 'rough ringfort') is a suburb of Dublin, Ireland. Originally a village, which from 1862 was part of the township of Rathmines and Rathgar, it was absorbed by the growing city and became a suburb in 1930. It lies about three kilometres south of the city centre.

== Location ==
Rathgar is on the southside of Dublin, beside Dartry, Harold's Cross, Rathmines and Terenure. Other nearby suburbs are Crumlin, Kimmage, Milltown, Ranelagh, and Rathfarnham. The Grand Canal flows to the north. The majority of the area lies within the jurisdiction of Dublin City Council and straddles the postal boundary of Dublin 6.

Rathgar is in the Dáil Éireann constituency of Dublin Bay South.

== History ==
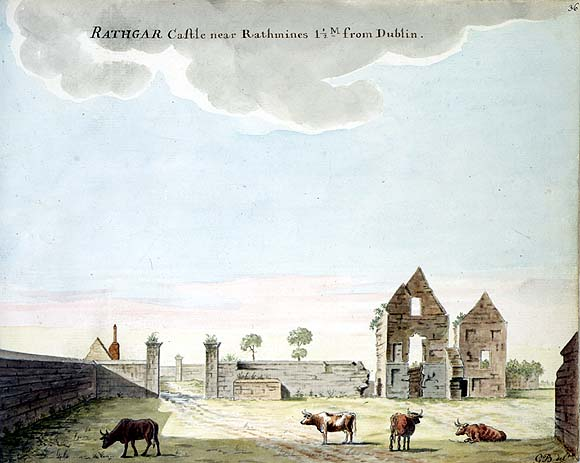
A painting of Rathgar castle by Gabriel Beranger.

One of the first recorded references to Rathgar ('Rathgarra') is in the Calendar of Christ Church Deeds of 1177.

Rathgar in the Middle Ages was a farm belonging to the Convent of St Mary de Hogges, at present-day College Green.

At the Dissolution of the Monasteries, Rathgar was granted to the Segrave family: they built Rathgar Castle, ownership of which subsequently passed to John Cusacke, who was Lord Mayor of Dublin in 1608. The castle remained in the possession of the Cusack family for over a century, but gradually decayed and was a ruin by the end of the eighteenth century. No trace of it remains today, though it is thought to have been located at present-day 44-49 Highfield Road.

In 1649 the Duke of Ormonde commander of the Anglo-Irish Royalist army established his camp at Rathgar during the Siege of Dublin. He was then routed at the Battle of Rathmines nearby by English Republican forces under Michael Jones.

The village began to develop in the eighteenth century. Rathgar Avenue may be the oldest street, while Highfield Road was developed in 1753. Zion Church and Christ Church Rathgar were built in the 1860s.

== Amenities ==
Rathgar is a largely residential suburb with amenities that include primary and secondary schools, nursing homes, child-care and sports facilities, and public transport to the city centre. The housing stock largely comprises red-brick late Georgian and Victorian era terraces and much of the area lies within an architectural conservation zone. Dodder Park is located in Rathgar. Cowper and Milltown are the nearest rail connections, located on the Luas Green Line.

One of the main schools in the area is The High School, Dublin, which moved to the area from its original location on Harcourt Street in 1971. The High School follows a liberal Anglican heritage, but also has students of Jewish heritage. Other schools include Stratford College on Zion Road, which was founded in the 1950s by members of the Jewish Community in Dublin. St Louis High School, Rathmines was opened in 1913 and provides education for girls. It is a member of The Le Cheile Schools Trust. St Mary's College, which provides education for boys, have sports facilities in Kenilworth Square, Rathgar. The rest of the school is in Rathmines. Rathgar is also the home of a school called Rathgar Junior School.

Rathgar has a number of retail outlets, including a small Supervalu supermarket, and several restaurants.

== Health care ==
St. Luke's Hospital is based on Highfield Road, and specialises in cancer treatments. Mount Carmel Community Hospital, located on Orwell Road, re-opened as a short-stay nursing home in September 2015.

== Religion ==
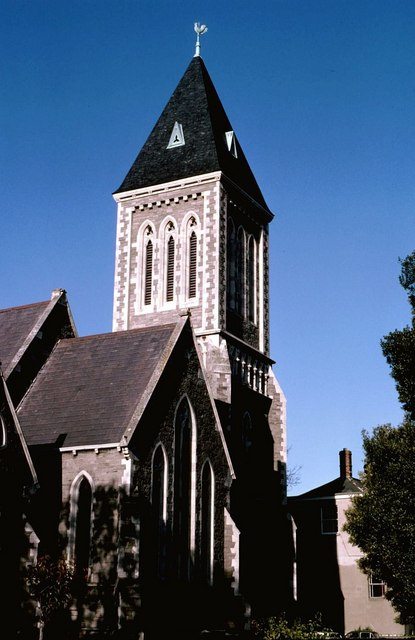
Zion Church, Rathgar

=== Churches ===
Churches serving the area include Christ Church Rathgar (part of the Presbyterian Church in Ireland) which is at the junction of Rathgar Road and Highfield Road in the village centre. The Roman Catholic church of The Three Patrons (named after the three patron saints of Ireland: St Patrick, St Bridget and St Columba) on Rathgar Road. It is also known as "The Servants' Church" because, in the late 19th and early 20th centuries, it was the place of worship for the large number of servants who worked and lived in the large houses in the area.

=== Theological College ===
The Church of Ireland Theological College and the Zion Church of Ireland at the junction of Zion and Bushy Park Road are also in Rathgar.

=== Synagogues ===
The Dublin Jewish Progressive Congregation (Knesset Orech Chayim) have their synagogue on Leicester Avenue, Rathgar. The orthodox Dublin Hebrew Congregation have their synagogue in nearby Terenure.

=== Convents ===
The Marist Sisters have a convent at 51 Kenilworth Square

== Diplomatic missions ==
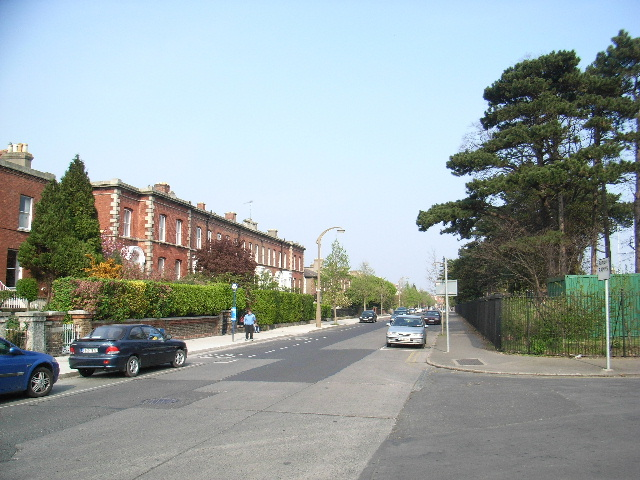
Kenilworth Square North

The embassy of the Russian Federation, including its consular office, is located on Orwell Road in Rathgar. Barbados also has an honorary consulate address in Rathgar.

== Notable residents ==
- Andrija Artukovic (1899–1988), convicted Croatian war criminal and Holocaust perpetrator, apparently lived in Rathgar for a period following the Second World War, after fleeing justice via a ratline, and was possibly aided by anti-British sentiment in Ireland.
- Arnold Bax (1883–1953), composer and poet who rented a villa in Bushy Park Road for a short time. He described the view in his autobiography:
  [f]rom the back windows of the incongruously named "Yeovil" there was... a clear vista of parklike wooded country and beyond that of the complete ring of the untamed Dublin Mountains. On any clear day one's eye could wander along that amphitheatre of beloved slopes, over Niall Glundubh's cairn on Tibradden, past haunted Kilmashogue, down into the sylvan hollows of Glendhu, up again along a red-brown fringe of leafless trees to the sinister ruins of Kilikee brooding over Dublin's south-western suburbs - "the Hellfire Club," monumental to the arrogance and violence of the eighteenth-century Irish gentry - until finally one's gaze rested upon Seefin, a pearl-grey phantasm of a mountain, its summit gleaming maybe with the snowdrifts of last week's blizzard. And deep in those folded hills, thirty miles away, was hidden Glendalough of the Seven Churches, an enchanted place of holy gloom.
  — Arnold Bax, Farewell My Youth (1943)
- Eamon "Ned" Broy, Irish police commissioner, military officer and sports administrator, lived at 25 Oakland Drive, Rathgar at the time of his death in 1972.
- Brian and Eamonn Fallon, co-founders of Daft.ie, grew up in Rathgar.
- James Joyce (1882–1941), novelist and short-story writer was born in Brighton Square.

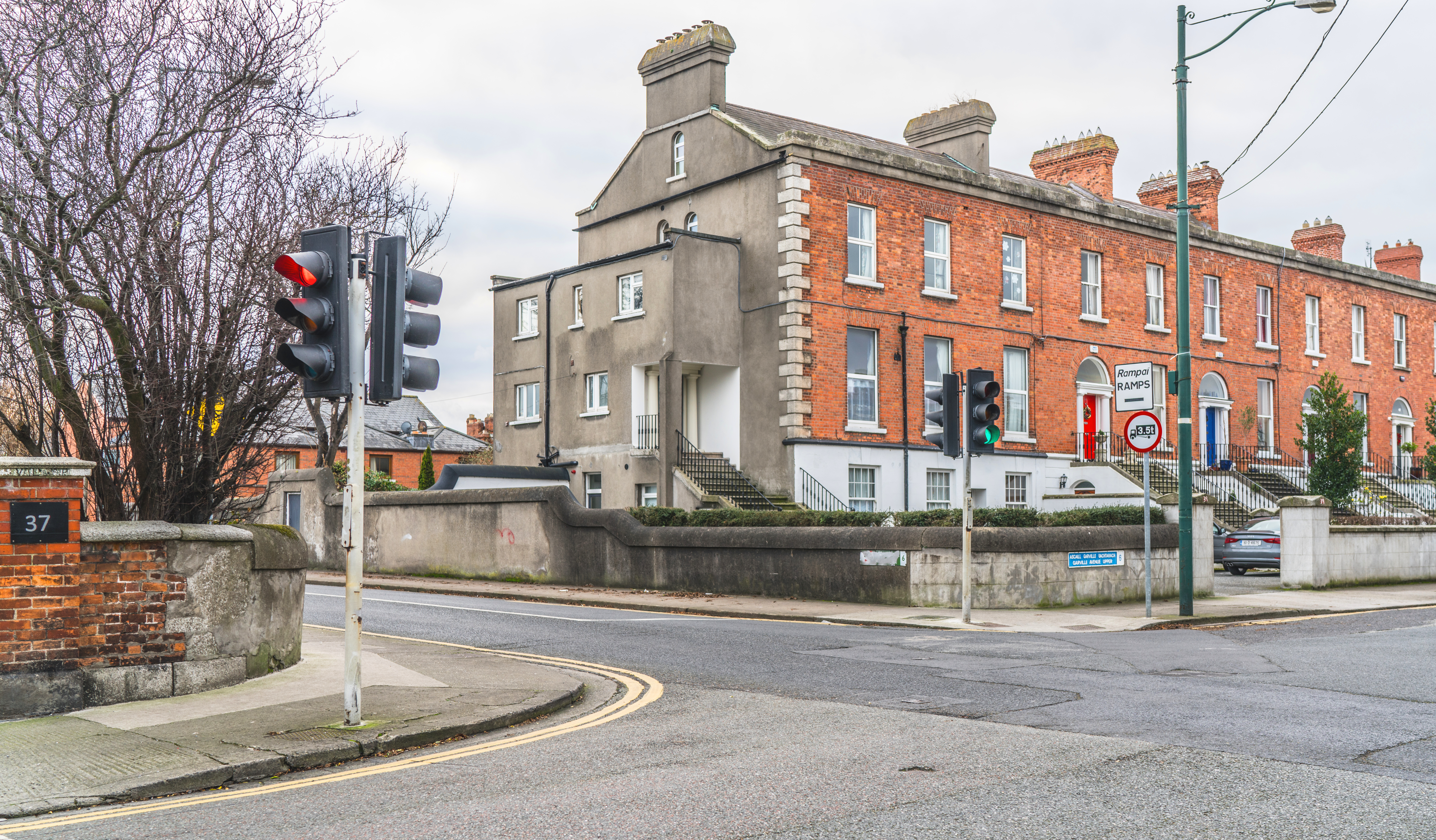
Garville Avenue, Rathgar

- Jack Lynch (1917–1999), Taoiseach who had a home on Garville Avenue.
- David Marcus (1924–2009), Cork-born editor and writer who lived in the area.
- Mary Lou McDonald (b.1969), politician, grew up on Orwell Road.
- Ulick O'Connor (1928–2019), writer and historian who was born in Rathgar and lived at Fairfield Park.
- Seumas O'Sullivan (1879–1958), poet and editor who spent much of his life in Rathgar
- George Dawson Preston (1896–1972), physicist born at Orwell Park.
- Dorothy Price (1890–1954), physician.
- George William Russell (1867–1935), lived in Rathgar for a time.
- Kate Sheppard (1848–1934) a prominent New Zealand suffragette. After her father died, her Irish mother brought the family to Kenilworth Square in Rathgar. Later they emigrated to New Zealand. Sheppard maintained her connection with the square and returned several times (including after speaking engagements in London) to stay with her aunt at Kenilworth Square.
- Francis Sheehy Skeffington (1878–1916) and Hanna Sheehy Skeffington (1877–1946) lived for a time at 8 Airfield Road.
- Bram Stoker (1847–1912), writer who lived at Orwell Park for a time.
- John Millington Synge (1871–1909), writer and playwright who lived at 4 Orwell Park.
- Éamon de Valera (1882–1975), a politician whose presidential office was moved to 53 Kenilworth Square in 1921 when his house in Blackrock was raided. It was in this house that Arthur Griffith presented Lloyd George's proposals for the Anglo-Irish Treaty to de Valera four days before the Treaty was signed in London.

== See also ==
- List of towns and villages in Ireland
