= Woodtown Progressive Jewish Cemetery =

Burial place in Dublin, Ireland

Details
- Established: 1952
- Location: Oldcourt Road, Woodtown, Rathfarnham, Co. Dublin
- Country: Ireland
- Type: Jewish (Progressive)
- Find a Grave: Woodtown Progressive Jewish Cemetery

Woodtown Progressive Jewish Cemetery is a Jewish cemetery in Rathfarnham, County Dublin, Ireland. It was opened, in 1952, by the Dublin Jewish Progressive Congregation.

The cemetery project was initiated after difficulties arose between the Progressive Jewish community in Dublin and other Jewish groups, and was driven by Bernard Spiro and others.

The graveyard is in a treed area, and features one building, a small prayer house, on one wall of which is a memorial plaque to victims of The Holocaust.

== Notable burials ==
- Estella Solomons (1882–1968), artist
