= Dublin Jewish Progressive Congregation =

Jewish group with synagogue in Dublin, Ireland

Coordinates: 53.3173°N 6.2726°W

Dublin Jewish Progressive Congregation is a Progressive Jewish community, founded in 1946, with a synagogue in Rathgar, Dublin, Ireland. It accounted for around 15 per cent of Dublin's Jewish population in 1999.

== History ==
The Dublin Jewish Progressive Congregation (DJPC) was founded in 1946, splitting off from the wider Dublin Jewish community, primarily Orthodox. Civil servant Laurence "Larry" Elyan gathered several Dublin Jews, and invited a Liberal Jewish leader, Rebbe Mattuck, from the UK to speak at a meeting at Dublin's Mansion House on the 15 January 1946. Within weeks the congregation had been formally launched and, on 26 March, it adopted its constitution at a general meeting. Other prominent early members included Bethel Solomons (who became the new congregation's president) and Mervyn Abrahamson. The congregation outlined its perspective, mixing tradition and contemporary practice: "The maintenance and encouragement of all those traditionally Jewish observances and symbols that serve to uphold Jewish family life or to enrich the spiritual life of the individual Jew ... but to recognise frankly the lapse or decay of obsolete practices, prohibitions, and devices."

The DJPC has long been a member of what is now the Movement for Progressive Judaism. There were tensions around the foundation of the community, and the differences in practice versus the Orthodox establishment, and these involved outside parties too, such as the former Chief Rabbi of Ireland, Yitzhak HaLevi Herzog, by then Chief Rabbi of Palestine.

The congregation's cemetery, Woodtown Progressive Jewish Cemetery, was established in 1952, and the foundation stone of the community's first dedicated synagogue was laid in 1952 also. The community has cooperated with the Orthodox Jewish community on Jewish sports club activity and the Jewish elder care home. In 1973, Micheál Mac Liammóir recorded an LP record for the community to help them raise funds.

As of 1999, the congregation accounted for 15 per cent of the Jewish population in Dublin.

Charles H Middleburgh is rabbi emeritus of the congregation and has served as its interim rabbi. Mary McAleese, President of Ireland, attended the synagogue during Hanukkah in 2002, on an occasion marking the centenary of the Liberal and Progressive Jewish Community of the UK and Ireland.
