= Babe's Bridge =

Remains of medieval bridge in Ireland

- Coordinates: 53°40′18″N 6°39′12″W
- Crosses: River Boyne
- Next upstream: Athlumley Bridge
- Next downstream: Broadboyne Bridge

Characteristics
- Material: Stone
- Traversable?: No

Location
- Interactive map of Babe's Bridge

Babe's Bridge is the remains of a 13th Century bridge over the River Boyne near Navan, County Meath, in Ireland. The southeast span is extant along with remains of some of the abutments in the river.

The remaining arch is owned by the heritage trust An Taisce - The National Trust for Ireland as part of the Boyne Navigation property.

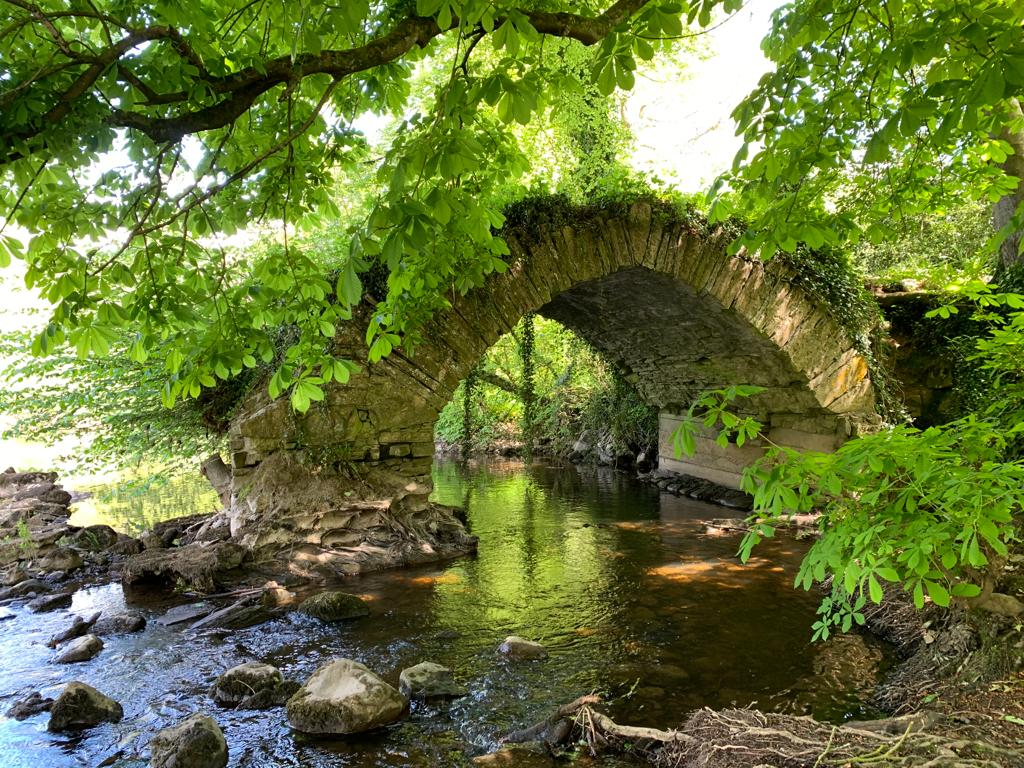
Remaining arch of Babe's Bridge over the River Boyne

== Etymology ==
Babe's Bridge was named after the local Norman landowner John le Baub who owned the land where the bridge was built.

== History ==
=== 20th century ===
In the 1980's the Office of Public Works carried out an underpinning of the north abutment in concrete with assistance from Meath County Council.

=== 21st century ===
In 2021 An Taisce and Meath County Council were awarded funding from the Department of Housing, Local Government and Heritage's Community Monuments Fund to carry out conservation studies for the structure.

== Future ==
An Taisce is seeking funding to carry out conservation works.
