= Charles H Middleburgh =

British progressive rabbi

Charles Hadley Middleburgh (born October 1956) is a British Progressive rabbi who is dean and director of Jewish Studies at the rabbinical seminary Leo Baeck College in London, where he has lectured for more than forty years.

Middleburgh was born in Hove, Sussex. He has a bachelor's degree from the Hebrew University of Jerusalem and also studied at University College London, where he obtained a PhD in Targumic Studies in 1982. He was ordained as a rabbi in 1986. He is rabbi emeritus of Dublin Jewish Progressive Congregation and has also served as its interim rabbi. He previously served at Cardiff Reform Synagogue.

Middleburgh is also a keen nature photographer.

== Publications ==
- Middleburgh, Charles (2021). Confronting Covid-19: Liberal and Reform Rabbis in the United Kingdom Respond to the Global Pandemic, Hakodesh Press, 220 pp. ISBN 978-6202455510

=== As co-author ===
- Middleburgh, Charles; Goldstein, Andrew (2010). High and Holy Days: A Book of Jewish Wisdom, Norwich: Canterbury Press, 160pp. ISBN 978-1853119941

=== As co-editor ===
- Middleburgh, Charles (editor); Goldstein, Andrew (editor) (2014). A Jewish Book of Comfort: three thousand years of wisdom and experience, Norwich: Canterbury Press, 192pp. ISBN 978-1848257214
