= Morehampton Road, Dublin =

Road in Dublin, Ireland

Morehampton Road
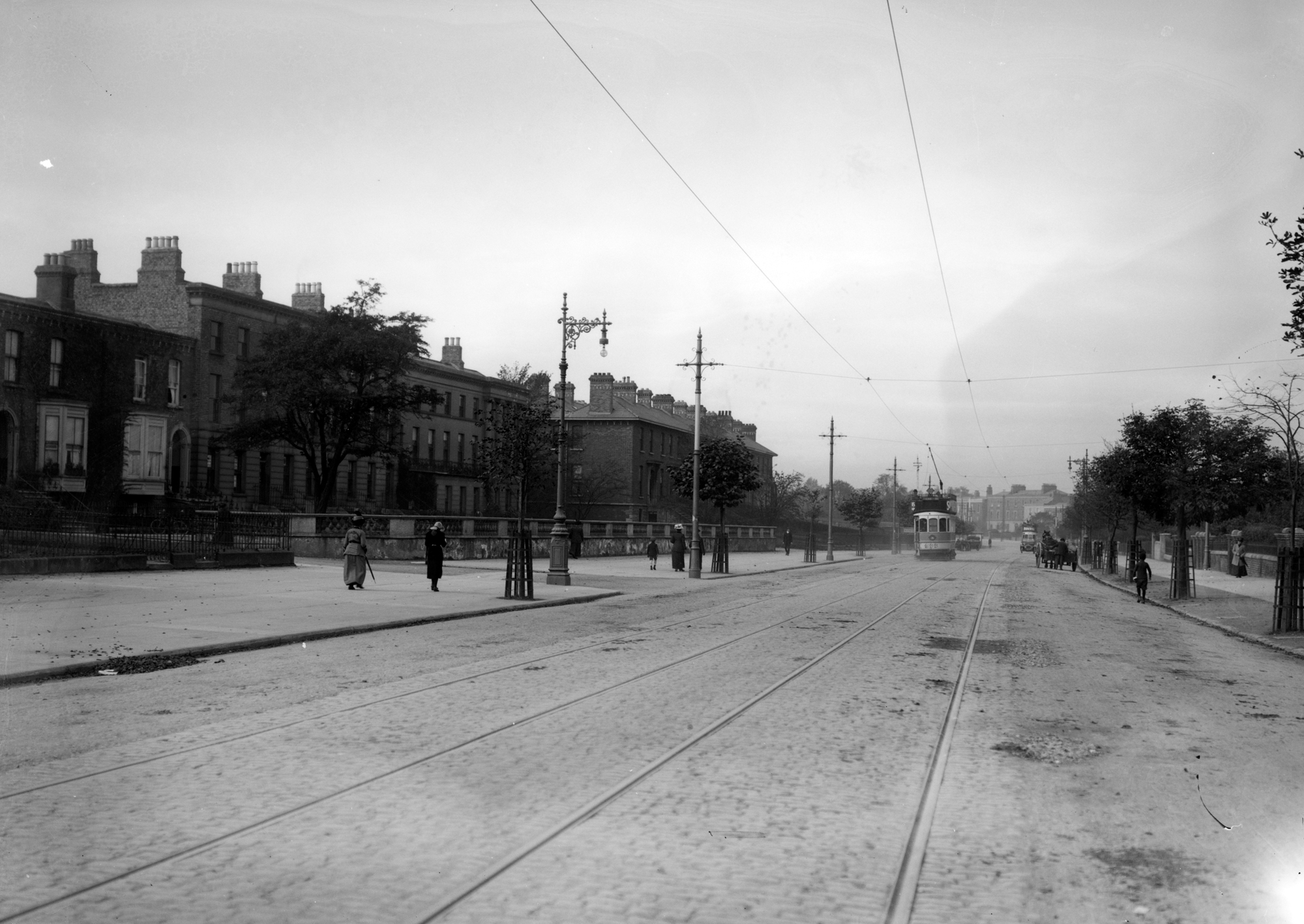
- Morehampton Road circa 1910 looking towards the city
- Interactive map of Morehampton Road
- Native name: Bóthar Morehampton (Irish)
- Namesake: Morehampton Park, Herefordshire
- Length: 600 m (2,000 ft)
- Width: 24 metres (79 ft)
- Location: Donnybrook, Dublin, Ireland
- Postal code: D04
- Coordinates: 53.325935°N 6.242195°W
- north end: Leeson Street
- south end: Donnybrook Road

Morehampton Road (Irish: Bóthar Morehampton) is a road running through Donnybrook in Dublin, Ireland. It runs from the junction of Upper Leeson Street and Sussex Road to Donnybrook Road. It meets Wellington Place, Herbert Park and Marlborough Road and forms one of the main radial routes out of the city.

== History ==
The street formed on an older route out of the city that stretched from St Stephen's Green and Leeson Street to the bridge over the River Dodder at Donnybrook and would have been used for centuries for those coming to Donnybrook Fair from the city. John Rocque's map of Dublin of 1756 annotates Leeson Street as 'Road to Donnybrook' although no detail is provided on the area which later formed Morehampton Road.

The road is known for its examples of large Victorian, Regency and late Georgian houses.

19-29 Morehampton Road, now known as the Hampton Hotel, was a terrace of Regency style houses which is extant on maps from about 1837. The first three having been built around 1830, with the remaining three built between 1850-76.

Numbers 1-17 on the street were developed by Alfred Gresham Jones from 1875.

The Grove wildlife sanctuary is also located on the road, occupying 0.5 hectares at the corner of Wellington Place. The site was donated to An Taisce by Miss Kathleen Goodfellow which owns the property in trust. Her father and uncle Jack Goodfellow, had earlier developed the Victorian red-brick houses numbers 2, 4, 6, 8, 10 and 12 Morehampton Road.

The road derives its name from Morehampton Park, the Herefordshire seat of the Hoskyns baronets.

== Notable residents ==
Éamon de Valera lived on the nearby Morehampton Terrace from 1910.

== See also ==
- List of streets and squares in Dublin
