= The Dublin Magazine =

Irish literary journal

The Dublin Magazine, July–Sept 1937

The Dublin Magazine was an Irish literary journal founded and edited by the poet Seumas O'Sullivan (real name James Sullivan Starkey) and published in Dublin by "Dublin Publishers, Ltd., 9 Commercial Buildings. London: Elkin Mathews, Cork St. W.1." The last page of the July 1925 issue (below the book reviews) states the it was printed by Cahill & Co. Ltd. Parkgate Printing Works and published by the proprietors of The Dublin Magazine at 7–9 Commercial Buildings, Dame Street, Dublin.

From August 1923 to August 1925 it was published as a monthly, then as a quarterly from January 1926 to June 1958, ceasing publication on O'Sullivan's death. The cover for the first issue was designed by artist Harry Clarke. The magazine featured fiction, poetry, drama and reviews and contributors included nearly every significant Irish writer of the period, including the playwright Samuel Beckett, the poet Austin Clarke, popular novelist Maurice Walsh, as well as Padraic Fallon, Padraic Colum, Patrick Kavanagh and Blanaid Salkeld among others.

The Dubliner was founded by a group of Trinity College Dublin (TCD) students who also set up New Square Publications in order to publish this professional literary magazine. The editor was Donald Carroll, an American graduate of TCD. The first issue was Nov.-Dec. 1961 where it was announced that it would be published bi-monthly. The second issue did not appear until March, 1962 and stated that Carroll's editorship had been taken over by Bruce Arnold, a TCD graduate from England living in Raheny, Co. Dublin. The Dubliner was published by New Square Publications, but soon became a quarterly with the Spring 1963 issue. Bruce Arnold's resignation was announced in the Spring 1964 issue with the new joint editors being Rivers Carew (an Englishman, TCD graduate, living in Ireland) and Timothy Brownlow (a Dubliner and TCD graduate).

In the spring of 1965 The Dubliner changed its name back to its illustrious predecessor, The Dublin Magazine, with the agreement of Seumas O'Sullivan's widow, Estella Solomons, whose consent the editors gratefully acknowledged. The Spring 1965 issue had an article on the original Dublin Magazine by Rudi Holzapfel, with several illustrations, among them two captioned respectively as the front covers of the first Dublin Magazine (August 1923) and the last (April–June 1958). The magazine continued for six years until 1969 under the joint editorship before it was taken on by John Ryan.

The Dublin Magazine was re-issued from 1970–75 by John Ryan.

In 2006, the Honorary Secretary of the Trinity College Dublin Association, Cambridge Branch, asked Rivers Carew to reminisce on his days with The Dublin Magazine at the Association's July meeting. He recalled how in the early 1960s a number of talented young poets then appearing on the scene were published by The Dublin Magazine such as Eavan Boland, Brendan Kennelly, Michael Longley and Derek Mahon who were all TCD graduates and went on to become highly regarded figures in the literary world. Some also had distinguished academic careers. Particularly noteworthy among the budding poets whose work appeared in the magazine was Seamus Heaney, the eventual Nobel Prize winner. Rivers Carew claimed that he and Timothy Brownlow wanted the magazine to be neither radical nor a staid organ of academe; its main purpose was to offer a platform for talented young writers, and the later achievements of the poets and others who were published show that it succeeded in that aim. The magazine was supported by the Irish Arts Council, by advertisers and members of the public "who had little or no reason to regret their interest or their generosity".
