= Seumas O'Sullivan =

Seumas or Seamus O'Sullivan (born James Sullivan Starkey; 17 July 1879 – 24 March 1958) was an Irish poet and editor of The Dublin Magazine. His father, William Starkey (1836–1918), a physician, was also a poet and a friend of George Sigerson. He was born in Dublin and spent his adult life in the suburb of Rathgar. In 1926, he married the artist Estella Solomons, sister of Bethel Solomons. Her parents were opposed to the marriage as Seumas was not Jewish.

His books include Twilight People (1905), Verses Sacred and Profane (1908), The Earth Lover (1909), Selected Lyrics (1910), Collected Poems (1912), Requiem (1917), Common Adventures (1926), The Lamplighter (1929), Personal Talk (1936), Poems (1938), Collected Poems (1940), and Dublin Poems (1946). Terence de Vere White praised him as "a true poet", and was critical of W. B. Yeats for leaving him out of his anthology of Irish poets, which he thought a particularly strange decision since Yeats and O'Sullivan were friends, although they quarrelled from time to time. In 1936 a version of a play by Irish playwright Teresa Deevy called The King of Spain's Daughter was included in The Dublin Magazine which was edited by O'Sullivan.

Seumas O'Sullivan and B.J. Brimmer Company were accredited within the 'Acknowledgments' of People and Music by Thomasine C. McGehee – published by Allyn and Bacon in the Junior High School Series, edited by James M. Glass, 1929 and 1931 respectively – for both (the frontispiece) In Mercer Street and the excerpt from Ballad of a Fiddler (page 93).

He had a great admiration for Patrick Kavanagh, and in the 1940s he was one of the very few Irish editors who was prepared to publish his poetry.

O'Sullivan was a friend of most of the leading literary figures in Dublin, including William Butler Yeats, James Stephens and George William Russell. His "at homes" on Sunday afternoons were a leading feature of Dublin literary life, as were Russell's Sunday evenings and Yeats's Monday evenings. He was inclined to be quarrelsome, due to his heavy drinking: on one occasion he insulted James Stephens publicly at a literary dinner. Even the kind-hearted Russell admitted that "Seumas drinks too much"; Yeats' verdict was that "the trouble with Seumas is that when he's not drunk, he's sober".

== Musical settings ==
O'Sullivan was also friendly with the composer E J Moeran, whose Six Poems by Seumas O'Sullivan (1944) is his most substantial solo vocal work, and arguably his finest. Moeran also published 'Invitation in autumn' (1943) as a separate song. With its straightforward language and direct imagery, his poetry was attractive to composers, particularly his most popular poem 'The Piper' ('A piper in the streets today') which was set by Peter Crossley-Holland, Michael Head, Ivor Gurney, Norman Peterkin and Vaughan Williams.
