= An Taisce =

Irish non-governmental organisation

An Taisce – The National Trust for Ireland
- Formation: 26 Sept. 1946 (provisional), 28 June 1948; 77 years ago
- Type: Non-governmental organisation
- Purpose: Environmentalism and Historic preservation
- Headquarters: 5 Foster Place
- Location: Dublin, Ireland
- CEO: Gary Freemantle
- Chairperson: Terri Morrissey
- President: Philip Kearney
- Website: www.antaisce.org

An Taisce – The National Trust for Ireland (Irish pronunciation: [ənˠ ˈt̪ˠaʃcə]; "An Taisce" meaning "the store" or "the treasury"), established on a provisional basis in September 1946, and incorporated as a company based on an "association not for profit" in June 1948, is a charitable non-governmental organisation (NGO) active in the areas of the environment and built heritage in the Republic of Ireland. It considers itself the oldest environmental and non-governmental organisation in the country, and is somewhat similar to the National Trust of England, Wales and Northern Ireland but based more directly on the National Trust for Scotland. Its first president was the prominent naturalist Robert Lloyd Praeger.

An Taisce is a membership-based charity, rather than a state or semi-state organisation, or quango, but it does receive government and European Union funding for specific programmes, such as Blue Flag beaches, and Green Schools private-sector funding for, for example, the Irish Business Against Litter surveys, and a mix of State and private funding for the annual National Spring Clean. An Taisce has for decades also had a statutory role in certain planning and environmental processes in the country.

The work of the organisation includes policy recommendation and campaigning in the built and natural heritage areas, the holding in trust of relevant properties, and environmentally-relevant education. It has a number of local associations, which may assist in caring for properties, and monitor planning in their areas. An Taisce's headquarters are in Dublin's oldest surviving guildhall, the Tailors' Hall, which it helped to restore.

== Development ==
=== Foundation ===
A public meeting to consider the need for a national trust was held in the Mansion House in September 1946, convened by the Royal Irish Academy, the Royal Society of Antiquaries of Ireland, An Óige, the Geographical Society of Ireland, the Dublin Naturalists' Field Club and the Irish Society for the Preservation of Birds. The meeting resolved to create such a body, and elected both a provisional committee, and a council of 16 plus 4 co-opted members, who secured bankers, auditors and solicitors. After extensive debate, the two-part name was chosen and application was made to form a not-for-profit company. Special approval was sought from the Minister for Trade and Commerce for charity-appropriate memorandum and articles, adhering to the "association not for profit" section of the then Companies Act, with a prohibition on distribution of surpluses, and for permission to omit the word "Limited" from the company name.

An Taisce was an indirect successor to the all-Island National Trust Committee which had ceased to exist in 1946 after the passing of the National Trust Act (Northern Ireland) 1946.

The organisation was duly incorporated as a company limited by guarantee on 28 June 1948. The initial constitution was modelled on that of the National Trust for Scotland. The first official meeting of the company was held on 15 July 1948 at the Royal Irish Academy's headquarters, Academy House on Dawson Street, and the first annual general meeting was convened on 23 September of the same year, with formal greetings from the National Trust and the National Trust for Scotland.

Notable founder directors and council members included Robert Lloyd Praeger, James Sleator, the Earl of Rosse, Patrick G. Kennedy, Arthur Cox, George Francis Mitchell and, co-opted, Cearbhall Ó Dálaigh, Seán MacBride and Colm Ó Lochlainn. Praeger was elected as the first president of the organisation and Professor Felix Hackett as chairperson. Praeger made an opening address which was subsequently broadcast nationally by Raidió Éireann.

=== Early years ===
An Taisce was concerned with questions about properties such as Muckross House, Kanturk Castle and Derrynane House, plans for North Bull Island and other nature reserves, and Saint Anne's Park, tree preservation and the work of the Electricity Supply Board and Bord na Mona; in 1951, the UK National Trust agreed to lease Kanturk Castle to An Taisce. The organisation supported the extension of the powers of Bord Failte to protect historic properties and places of scenic or other special interest in 1952, which was also the year it considered the question of what would much later become its headquarters, the Tailors' Hall.

In 1954, An Taisce joined the International Union for the Conservation of Nature (IUCN), and with a Northern Irish government department, submitted a list of Irish nature reserves to that body; it also took part in discussions about Ireland's potential first national park and the possible preservation of example bogs. Submissions on Dublin planning were acknowledged and acted on, and plans for what would later become the Wood Quay civic office complex were thought to have been set aside. The range of bodies invited to nominate members to the council of the organisation was extended, and now included the Royal Institute of the Architects of Ireland.

=== The 1960s ===
The question of preservation of the natural environment of the Burren was addressed multiple times by the organisation, which also took part in discussions about preventing waterbody pollution, and opposed a plan to infill part of the Grand Canal. In 1961, campaigning by An Taisce and the new Irish Georgian Society led to a promise by Dublin Corporation not to demolish the Tailors' Hall. In 1962 it received a ministerial request to agree to be formally consulted on questions of nature and amenity conservation, and in 1964 it was given an advisory role supporting local authorities which had defunct quarries in their areas. An Taisce was given a seat on the advisory council of An Foras Forbatha, and received some clerical support from that agency.

By 1965, the organisation was becoming involved in more planning and development referrals, both impacting natural sites, from the Bourne Vincent Memorial Park and the Cliffs of Moher to Booterstown marsh and Bull Island, and the built environment, such as around Mountjoy Square in Dublin. In 1966, membership surged from 450 to over 1100, after an exhibition and the release of a booklet on preservation of heritage, while an amenity study for parts of Dublin sold well the following year. The routine administration of the organisation moved from volunteers' homes to offices on Baggot Street, and it formally requested legal powers like those of the National Trust in Britain. Towards the end of the decade, An Taisce received 5,500 acres of land in County Donegal, and a lease and management rights over much of the undeveloped part of Howth Head, and Ireland's Eye.

In 1969, the organisation was heavily involved in the campaign to stop the demolition of houses on Hume Street, Dublin in what was an important moment in the battle to protect Georgian Dublin.

By 1969, membership reached 3,600, with 18 local branches operating, and the first campaign to circulate educational material in schools was launched. Also in 1969, An Taisce was asked by Charles Haughey, Minister for Finance, to survey the country's major houses and gardens, and also the non-national museums.

=== The 1970s ===
The 1970s began with membership passing 5,000 for the first time, and becoming majority non-Dublin. Kevin Boland, a planning decision-maker as Minister for Local Government, while claiming to generally follow An Taisce's advice in planning matters, attacked what he perceived as criticism from the organisation, though a reference to "the Georgians" suggests issues with the Irish Georgian Society also. County heritage surveys were organised, and An Taisce joined Europa Nostra. Court action was taken to try to stop local authority usage of part of Bull Island as a rubbish dump, and the dumping was stopped in 1971, though legal action continued for some years; the Booterstown marsh was taken into the organisation's care the same year. An Taisce's Tree Committee carried out a tree survey of County Dublin.

In 1972, the body sought provision for environmental impact assessments for large developments, and in 1973 it appointed its first full-time director and opened an office in Cork. Erskine Childers, President of Ireland was guest of honour at the organisation's silver jubilee celebration. In 1974, a Heritage Gardens Committee was formed and membership approached 7,400, with 27 active local associations, while An Taisce co-founded the European Environmental Bureau. In 1975, the organisation began planning what would become the Irish Architectural Archive and membership passed 8,000; suggestions it made were incorporated into several pieces of legislation. A Heritage Trust to raise funds for the body's work, with a target of 750,000 pounds, was founded, and the offices moved to Percy Place. In 1978, financial difficulties saw staffing cut from 10 to 3, while in 1979, a damaged bog at Ahascragh was swapped for Mongan Bog, and Oweninny Bog and a portion of land on Morehampton Road were placed in An Taisce's care, and the Irish Wildlife Federation was established.

Publications included several reports concerning trees, a study of the Fairview to Sutton part of Dublin Bay, and another of the impact of sewage in Galway Bay, along with guides to Slane, Adare, Clonmel and Rathmullan, a study of Dublin street furniture and another of Lough Ine in County Cork.

=== The 1980s ===
In 1981, An Taisce made contact with a number of Northern Ireland bodies on the topic of heritage gardens, and discussions expanded into other areas of mutual interest; in 1982, a joint conference with the Ulster Architectural Heritage Society was organised. Also in 1982, An Taisce was formally recognised as a charity by the Irish Revenue Commissioners, and the six local associations operating within the city and county of Dublin formed an umbrella body. By 1983, the Heritage Trust founded to fund An Taisce projects had defined new purposes, and subsequently became the Irish Resource Development Trust, focused on community development and local employment; An Taisce moved to temporary offices and put staff on reduced hours. The organisation was given a role in the appointment in the members of An Bord Pleanala.

In 1983, An Taisce obtained an injunction against the owners of Allenton House in Tallaght after the facade of the listed Georgian house was partially demolished. The property was further damaged by fire later in the year and was finally fully demolished in August 1984.

Also in 1984, An Taisce moved to Tailors' Hall, but with just two employees, and restoration work commenced in 1985 and continued for several years. Also in 1984, the organisation was awarded the National Heritage Award, and at a seminar of the Trees Committee, the Tree Council of Ireland was launched. In 1985, a special agreement type provided for under planning legislation, in which An Taisce acted as guarantor for the preservation of a heritage property, was enacted for the first time, to preserve Castlehyde near Fermoy for at least 35 years.

The 40th anniversary of the founding meeting was marked in 1986, and a restoration project begun at Drimnagh Castle, while in 1987, EEC funding was secured for several projects and publications and in 1988 Tailors' Hall was officially opened by the Taoiseach, Charles Haughey, and the Lord Mayor of Dublin, Carmencita Hederman. In 1989, An Taisce played a key role in the launch of Conservation Volunteers Ireland, though the two organisations severed links just three years later.

=== The 1990s ===
In 1990, a letter on a topic which had concerned An Taisce over many years, that of Fota House and estate, resulted in a suit by the chairman of the Fota Trust, was settled out of court with a payment from the organisation. A policy document on forestry was produced, and a conference on the topic hosted (resulting in a further publication the following year), while the organisation continued active engagement on the future of Irish bogs. Both an environment resources management officer and a planning officer were employed. 1990 also saw significant action in opposition to what An Taisce and others deemed to be unsuitable plans for interpretative centres for Mullaghmore in the Burren, the Rock of Cashel, Dunquin and Luggala; the Mullaghmore and Luggala topics ran until 1994. 1992 saw the foundation of the Dublin Civic Trust driven by a member of long standing, Geraldine Walsh.

1993 was the year when the organisation was asked by the State to take over the Blue Flag system for Irish beaches, and the second An Taisce conference on aquaculture was also held that year, with papers published in 1994. A joint project of An Taisce, the Irish Georgian Society and the Irish Tree Society supported the Irish government in purchasing Coolattin Wood of ancient oaks in County Wicklow, while a local association in northern Wicklow was suspended after a hostile takeover, and dissolved in 1993. In 1994, the major County Donegal property was placed on a long lease with the Irish government, to be operated as part of Glenveagh National Park until at least 2093. In a joint arrangement with the National Trust, a scheme of visit concessions was introduced as a membership benefit. In 1995, the Dublin City local association was suspended for a year due to internal fighting.

In 1996, An Taisce launched training on environmental matters for industry, with Ibec, Ireland's Environmental Protection Agency and a clean technology advisory unit, and also launched the Green Schools programme in Ireland. A commemoration of the 50th anniversary of the founding meeting was held on 26 September 1996, with a reception for members and guests with the President of Ireland, Mary Robinson. An ecumenical service of thanksgiving at St Patricks's Cathedral, as well as the planting of 50 oak trees in the Phoenix Park, also formed part of the commemoration. Celebrations continued through 1997, including a joint event with the National Trust, and a closing function with the Taoiseach, Bertie Ahern attending as the guest of honour. 1997 also saw the launch of litter surveying by An Taisce for Irish Business Against Litter, which continues to the present.

The Office of Public Works agreed in 1998 to maintain Tailors' Hall in return for up to 100 days of use each year of its function rooms, to be administered by the Dublin Castle conference centre unit. The annual National Spring Clean was launched, with 155,000 participants across 1,732 events. Also launched was a first university branch, in University College Dublin, while one formerly very active local association closed in Fingal, and two others were revived. Conflict emerged within An Taisce's governing council, as many members wanted to pursue what they saw as a more active agenda promoted by a new NGO, Friends of the Irish Environment. An Taisce appealed successfully against an extension plan for the National Gallery of Ireland, which would have resulted in the loss of a Georgian building, and worked with the gallery on a new plan, which proceeded. In 1999, Kanturk Castle was fully made over to An Taisce by the National Trust, while major planning applications addressed included what would later become the Trump golf resort at Doonbeg. The government provided a three-year guaranteed major grant, and this, with two significant bequests, left An Taisce on a strong financial base. Meanwhile, there were major changes in both staff and leadership, with Michael Smith, a barrister by training, taking over as chairperson.

== Mission and scope ==
An Taisce's work and expertise deals with the Republic of Ireland's natural, built, and social heritage. It seeks to educate, inform, and lead public opinion on the environment, to advocate and influence policy, and to manage a portfolio of heritage properties. Despite the "National Trust" element of its full name, the organisation never secured legislation giving it property-receiving "in perpetuity" rights like those of the UK National Trusts, and this was a point of discussion and lobbying many times across its history.

=== Statutory roles ===
The Planning Acts provide for An Taisce, and about 20 other prescribed bodies (all others being State-sponsored), to be informed of all planning applications in areas of scenic beauty or high amenity significance or where architectural, archaeological or environmental issues need to be considered. Local authorities are required, in certain defined circumstances under the Planning & Development Regulations, to consult An Taisce on development proposals.

== Structure ==
The organisation comprises several thousand members, with a range of membership types and fees. Overall steering of the organisation is in the hands of a council, which in turn elects a board of directors (charity trustees), and other internal policy and operational committees.

Some members are also organised in what are called local associations, which operate under policies set by the national body, but with some element of autonomy. 11 such associations exist as of 2023, with others having existed in the past, such as in Fingal and Dublin city; at peak, there were 27 and over time they have existed in 25 of Ireland's 26 counties. In 2001, there were 21 local associations across 17 of the 26 counties.

== Operations ==
The organisation has three main operational divisions.

The Properties Unit looks after properties that have either historical significance or are environmentally sensitive. The properties are taken care of by both professional staff and volunteers who are involved with the day-to-day management of income generating properties such as Tailors' Hall (which it also makes available for private hire) and the restoration of important resources such as the Boyne Navigation. This unit is funded primarily by donations and legacies, and works mostly through volunteers.

The Advocacy Unit monitors roughly 5% of all planning (local authority development approval) applications made annually, making submissions on a small number of those received, and appealing about 300 decisions a year to An Bord Pleanála, the statutory planning appeals board. The Advocacy Unit also monitors environmental standards and co-ordinates policy formation from the elected advocacy committees amongst the membership. This unit is funding almost entirely by member contributions and donations, and the work is mostly performed by volunteers, with a small paid staff.

The Environmental Education Unit operates nationwide programmes on behalf of the Irish government's Department of the Environment, Community and Local Government, the National Transport Authority and the European Union, such as the Blue Flag water quality accreditation programme and Green Schools Programme that aims to promote higher environmental standards in schools. Much of this unit's work is funded by the Irish government and EU programmes, and some by private bodies such as Irish Business Against Litter, and it is mostly carried out by paid staff.

As of 2024, An Taisce had over 110 staff, including a leadership team of 4 senior positions, a CEO, Director of Education and Community, Development Director and Financial Director. There are also positions handling members and donors.

After many years formally based at the offices of the Royal Irish Academy, and a variety of home and leased offices, its headquarters are since the late 1980s in Dublin's last surviving intact guildhall, the Tailors' Hall, with a second office, for the large education division, nearby in Swift's Alley in Dublin's Liberties.

== Trust properties ==
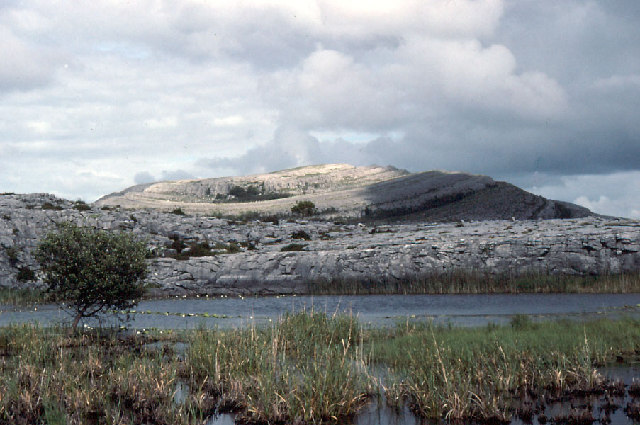
Mullach Mor

An Taisce holds a range of properties in trust:

- Tailors' Hall, Back Lane, central Dublin (registered office)
- Babe's Bridge, on the River Boyne
- the Booterstown marsh Nature Reserve, coastal southern Dublin, in the care of the Dun Laoghaire - Rathdown Local Association
- the Boyne Navigation, a canal, and its towpath, County Meath, donated in 1969 and partially restored
- Corlican Quaker burial ground, Wexford
- Gort Weigh House, County Galway
- Crocknafarragh, a mountain area in County Donegal (2,605 hectares), transferred from the Irish Land Commission on nominal terms in 1968, and leased to the Irish state as an extension of Glenveagh National Park
- A farmhouse in Killaha West, County Kerry
- A section of The Burren from Gortlecka to Mullaghmore, near Inchiquin, County Clare (15 ha.), bought in 1977
- The Grove, on a corner of Morehampton Road, a wildlife sanctuary in south inner Dublin, donated in 1979
- The Gull Islands and Rough Island, Mulroy Bay, County Donegal, acquired in 1990 and 1995 respectively
- Kanturk Castle, County Cork, a 17th-century building transferred from the National Trust, initially on a leasehold basis, then in 1998, freehold; in the guardianship of the Office of Public Works
- Mongan Bog, County Offaly (125 ha.), acquired in an exchange in 1987
- Oweninny Bog, Balcorrick, County Mayo, iron flush bog (9 ha.), including the source of the Sruffaunnamuingabatia, transferred by Bord na Mona in 1984
- Slieve Beagh (former estate of Rossmore Castle), County Monaghan and County Tyrone (2,200 acres, 2/3 in the Republic of Ireland)

Properties formerly in An Taisce's care include:

- Ahascragh Bog, near Ballinasloe, County Galway, donated by Bord na Mona, and due to damage, later swapped for Mongan Bog
- Garrylough Mill, County Wexford, leased to An Taisce, 1975 to 1985 and partially restored
- A large section of the Howth Estate, including Ireland's Eye, County Dublin, leased from the Howth Estate and managed, 1968 to 1987
- Howth's Old Courthouse, County Dublin, on leasehold from 1983 to 2018

and others worked on include Ireland's only intact moated castle, Drimnagh Castle.

== See also ==
- National trust, with a listing of national trusts worldwide
- National Trust, the national trust for Northern Ireland, Wales and England.
- Irish Heritage Trust
