= Geographical Society of Ireland =

Learned society

The Geographical Society of Ireland (GSI) Irish: Cumann Tíreolaíochta na héireann was founded in 1934 to promote geographical studies in Ireland and welcomes as members all persons interested in the subject.

== Activities ==
The Society hosts seminars, workshops, field trips and other events during the year, principally in Dublin, but also in other cities such as Limerick, Galway, Belfast and Cork. The Society has an annual conference on issues of concern to geographers and the general public. The conference is open to all members.

== Location ==
The Geographical Society of Ireland is not located in any one university but traditionally meets in the university of the current President. Members of the committee are based in most of the geography departments of Irish universities. A majority of geography academics across the Republic of Ireland and Northern Ireland are members of the GSI, and many contribute continually to the internationally renowned peer-reviewed journal Irish Geography.

== Peer-reviewed journal ==
The primary publication of the Geographical Society of Ireland is Irish Geography, the premier peer-reviewed journal devoted to the geography of Ireland. It has an international distribution and is read on all five continents.

== Geonews ==
Geonews is the newsletter of the Geographical Society of Ireland, providing news and information about geography in Ireland and about the activities of the Society. It acts as a forum for the discussion of matters of general geographical interest.

== Special publications ==
A number of special publications have also been published in recent time, based on one-day conferences hosted by the society.

Membership of the society is open to all those who have an academic interest or curiosity into geography and the geography of Ireland.
